= US Army Engineer Command, Vietnam =

United States Army Engineer Command, Vietnam
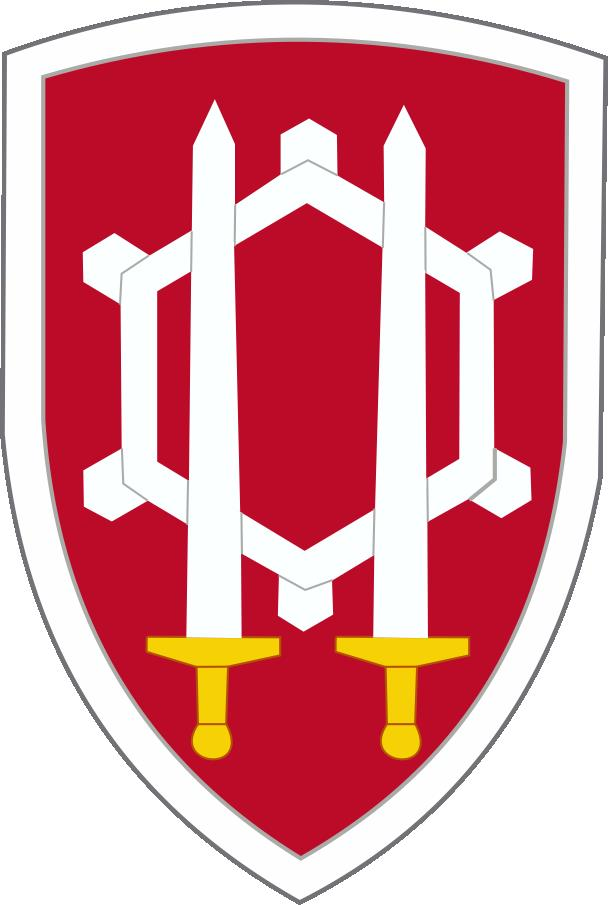
- Active: 1966-1971
- Country: United States
- Branch: United States Army
- Role: Engineer
- Size: Command
- Part of: Military Assistance Command, Vietnam
- Garrison/HQ: Long Binh, Vietnam

Commanders
- Notable commanders: John A. B. Dillard; Charles C. Noble

United States Army Engineer Command, Vietnam (USAECV) was a unit of US Army Vietnam from 1966 through 1971.

General William Westmoreland, Military Assistance Command, Vietnam (MACV) commander created USAECV in 1966 to oversee all engineering projects in Vietnam.

The Command's first challenge was to execute General William Westmoreland's MOOSE program (Move Out of Saigon Expeditiously) - the commanding generals order for unit headquarters to get out of the capital including moving the MACV headquarters to Tan Son Nhut Airbase. This would require a great amount of construction projects including the Đồng Tâm Base Camp. Major General Robert R. Ploger would become the USAECV commander. The second would be the continued construction of the pier at Cam Ranh Bay and other port projects. Its third goal was paving 900 miles of modern highways to connect the cities which often included bridge construction.

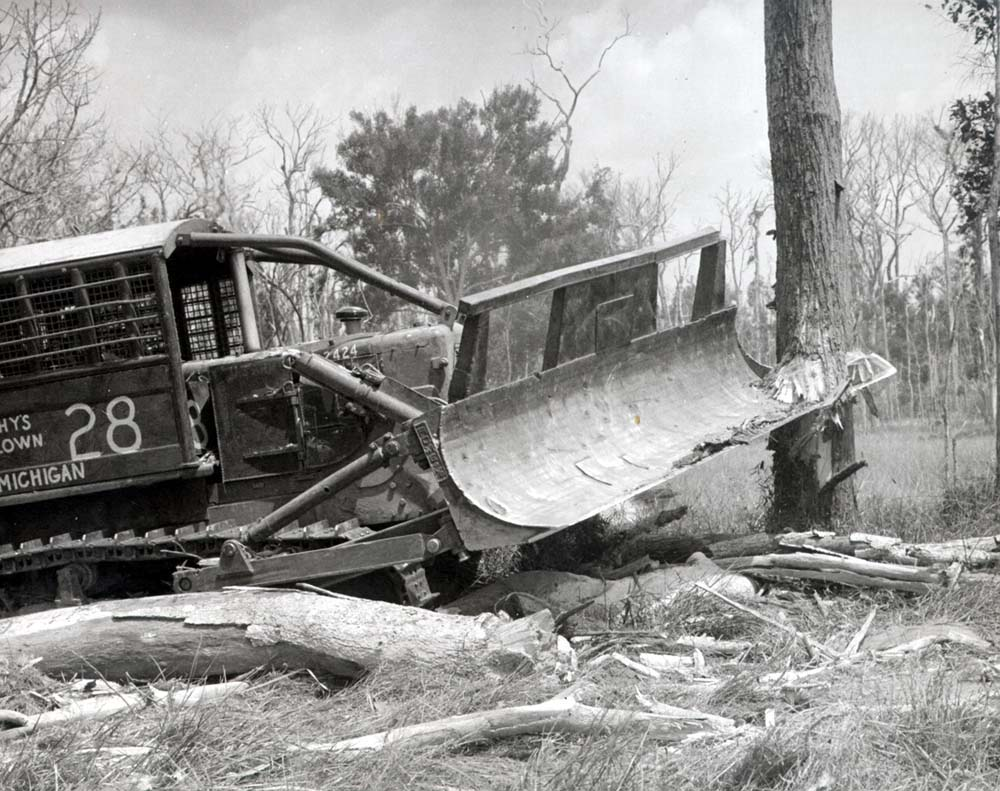
Rome Plow clears trees to create a landing zone.

In 1967, USAECV's role changed from basic construction to combat support and upgrading lines of communication. The command took part in Operation Cedar Falls and Operation Junction City using "tank dozers" with Rome Plow blades to clear areas inside the Iron Triange creating landing zones and minesweeping. They were also responsible for tunnel destruction, destroying 10,900 yards of tunnels.

In August 1967, Gen. Ploger concluded his time in Vietnam and was replaced by Major General Charles M. Duke. The next month discussions began with the commanders of Vietnam Field Force I and II about getting more engineer support in the field. It was decided to assign some of the brigades directly to the commands and U.S. Army Engineer Construction Agency, Vietnam would replace USAECV as the agency in charge of construction projects from 1971.

== Subordinate Units (1968–1971) ==
- 18th Engineer Brigade
  - 35th Engineer Group (Construction)
    - 14th Combat Engineer Battalion
    - 87th Construction Engineer Battalion
    - 577th Construction Engineer Battalion
    - 864th Construction Engineer Battalion
  - 45th Engineer Group (Construction)
    - 19th Combat Engineer Battalion
    - 35th Combat Engineer Battalion
    - 39th Combat Engineer Battalion
    - 84th Construction Engineer Battalion
    - 589th Construction Engineer Battalion
  - 937th Engineer Group (Combat)
    - 20th Combat Engineer Battalion
    - 70th Combat Engineer Battalion
    - 299th Combat Engineer Battalion
    - 815th Construction Engineer Battalion
- 20th Engineer Brigade
  - 34th Engineer Group (Construction)
    - 27th Combat Engineer Battalion
    - 86th Combat Engineer Battalion
    - 36th Construction Engineer Battalion
    - 69th Construction Engineer Battalion
    - 93rd Construction Engineer Battalion
  - 79th Engineer Group (Construction)
    - 168th Combat Engineer Battalion
    - 588th Combat Engineer Battalion
    - 34th Construction Engineer Battalion
    - 554th Construction Engineer Battalion
  - 159th Engineer Group (Construction)
    - 46th Construction Engineer Battalion
    - 62nd Construction Engineer Battalion
    - 92nd Construction Engineer Battalion
    - 169th Construction Engineer Battalion

== Commanders ==
=== USAECV ===
Major General Robert R. Ploger	September 1965
Major General Charles M. Duke	August 1967
Major General William T. Bradley	May 1968
Major General David S. Parker	July 1969
Major General John A. B. Dillard	December 1969
Brigadier General Robert M. Tarbox	May 1970 (interim)
Major General Charles C. Noble	June 1970
Major General Robert P. Young	August 1971
Brigadier General James A. Johnson	March 1972 to inactivation

=== 18th Engineer Brigade ===
Colonel C. Craig Cannon	September 1965
Brigadier General Robert R. Ploger	September 1965
Colonel Paul W. Ramee	December 1966
Brigadier General Charles M. Duke	April 1967
Brigadier General Andrew P. Rollins Jr.	September 1967
Brigadier General Williard Roper	November 1967
Brigadier General John H. Elder Jr.	September 1968
Brigadier General John W. Morris	May 1969
Brigadier General Henry C. Schrader	May 1970 until inactivation

=== 20th Engineer Brigade ===
Brigadier General Curtis W. Chapman Jr.	August 1967
Brigadier General Harold R. Parfitt	November 1968
Brigadier General Edwin T. O'Donnell	November 1969
Brigadier General Kenneth B. Cooper	October 1970 until inactivation
