= General Noble =

General Noble may refer to:

- Alfred H. Noble (1894–1983), U.S. Marine Corps general
- Charles C. Noble (1916–2003), U.S. Army major general
- Robert Houston Noble (1861–1939), U.S. Army brigadier general
- Roger Noble (born 1966), Australian Army major general
