= Operation Cedar Falls =

Part of the Vietnam War (1967)

- Part of the Vietnam War
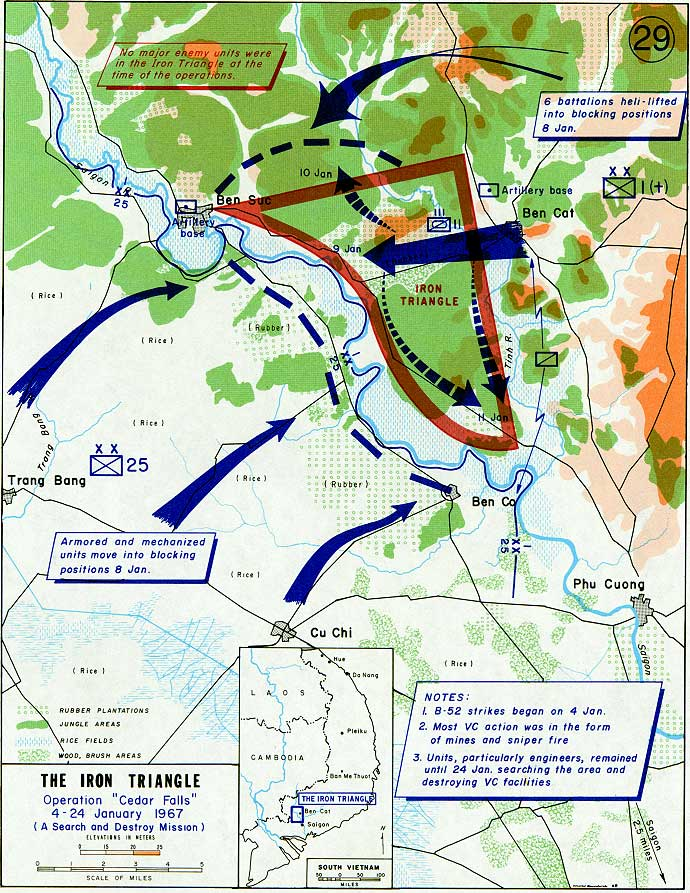
- Operation Cedar Falls
Date	8–26 January 1967
Location	Iron Triangle, Bình Dương Province, Republic of Vietnam
Result	See Results and aftermath

Belligerents
United States; South Vietnam	North Vietnam; Viet Cong

Units involved
1st Infantry Division; 25th Infantry Division; 196th Light Infantry Brigade; 173rd Airborne Brigade; 11th Armored Cavalry Regiment	272nd Regiment; 165th Regiment; Phu Loi Local Force Battalion

Strength
30,000	Unknown

Casualties and losses
(United States) 72 killed 337 wounded (South Vietnam) 11 killed, 8 wounded 7 armor vehicles destroyed North Vietnam/Viet Cong claimed: 2,700 casualties 30 tank/APCs destroyed 13 aircraft/helicopter destroyed	U.S. claimed: 720 killed 280 captured 540 defected 590 individual and 29 crew-served weapons recovered North Vietnam/Viet Cong report: ~1,000 casualties (one half were civillian)
- 512 suspects detained 6000 civilians deported from area

Operation Cedar Falls was a military operation of the Vietnam War conducted primarily by US forces that took place from 8 to 26 January 1967. The aim of the massive search-and-destroy operation was to eradicate the Iron Triangle, an area northwest of Saigon that had become a major stronghold of the Viet Cong (VC).

It was the largest American ground operation of the Vietnam war: two Army divisions, one infantry and one paratrooper brigade, and one armored cavalry regiment participated in the operation. Altogether, it involved 30,000 US and South Vietnamese troops. The VC, however, chose to evade the massive military force by fleeing across the border to Cambodia or by hiding in a complex system of tunnels. Still, the Allied forces uncovered and destroyed some of the tunnel complexes as well as large stockpiles of VC supplies. In the course of the operation, so-called tunnel rats were introduced to infiltrate the Viet Cong's tunnel systems.

In an attempt at the permanent destruction of the Iron Triangle as a VC stronghold, Operation Cedar Falls also entailed the complete deportation of the region's civilian population to so-called New Life Villages, the destruction of their homes, and the defoliation of whole areas. Following this, the area was declared a free-fire zone and adults who were found in the zone following deportations were considered "enemy combatants" afterwards.

Most senior officers involved in planning and executing the operation later evaluated it as a success. Most journalists and military historians, however, paint a bleaker picture. They argue that Cedar Falls failed to achieve its main goal since the VC's setback in the Iron Triangle proved to be only temporary. Moreover, critics argue that the harsh treatment of the civilian population was both morally questionable and detrimental to the US effort to win Vietnamese hearts and minds and drove many into the ranks of the VC instead. Therefore, some authors cite Operation Cedar Falls as a major example of the misconceptions and inadequate perceptions of US strategy in Vietnam and for its morally troublesome consequences.

== Background ==
=== The Iron Triangle ===
The planning for Operation Cedar Falls evolved out of the broader strategic aims which MACV, the United States' unified command structure for its military forces in South Vietnam, had formulated for 1967. Following the war's earlier stages, in which the dispatch of a large number of US ground troops had averted the collapse of the South Vietnamese regime and during which the Americans had built up their forces, COMUSMACV General William C. Westmoreland planned to go on the offensive during 1967. He planned to clear big People's Army of Vietnam (PAVN) or VC strongholds and to push communist forces into South Vietnam's lightly populated border regions where US forces would be able to make more lavish use of their firepower.

The town of Bến Súc was in a central area of the Iron Triangle and politically controlled by the VC. Prior to 1964, the town was ostensibly neutral, with both ARVN and VC presence. In 1964 the ARVN outpost was overrun and the area was declared a liberated zone, with the VC establishing its own governing apparatus. Bến Súc was described by Jonathan Schell as an important market town for the region with a population of 3,500, and a refuge point for people fleeing from combat operations and US/ARVN aerial and artillery nearby. The area was located in proximity to several free-fire zone, and the village was surrounded by the daily presence of bombardment in nearby hills and forests and occasional bombardment from US forces.

On Westmoreland's order, Lieutenant General Jonathan O. Seaman, Commanding General, II Field Force, Vietnam, began planning for an operation code named Operation Junction City aimed at disrupting VC control of War Zone C. When the strength of Seaman's troops built up he suggested an attack on another major VC stronghold as well, the so-called Iron Triangle. This was the nickname for an area of approximately 155 km^{2} (60 sq mi) about 20 km (12 mi) north of Saigon which, being bounded by the Saigon River to the southwest, Than Dien Forest to the north, and the Thi Tinh River to the east, had a roughly triangular shape. Virtually since the beginning of the Second Indochinese War, this area had become a big VC staging ground and rear area which, by 1966, South Vietnamese government officials or military forces had not dared to enter in years. Due to the Iron Triangle's location, shape, and the scope of VC activity there, it had been called a "dagger pointed at the heart of Saigon". Westmoreland agreed and so it was decided that Operation Junction City was to be preceded by Operation Cedar Falls.

Since earlier efforts to clear the VC from the Iron Triangle had failed, Operation Cedar Falls was intended to achieve nothing less than its eradication as an enemy sanctuary and base of operations. Therefore, Operation Cedar Falls was to involve not only an assault on regular VC forces and their infrastructure, but also the deportation of the area's entire civilian population, the destruction of their homes, the area's defoliation, and its categorization as a free-fire zone.

=== Opposing forces and terrain ===
American intelligence indicated that the VC's Military Region IV headquarters were located in the Iron Triangle; their destruction thus was a principal aim of the operation. Moreover, the 272nd Regiment, the 1st and 7th Battalions of Military Region IV under the VC 165th Regiment, the Phu Loi Local Force Battalion, plus three local force companies, as well as the 2nd, 3rd, and 8th Battalions of the 165th Regiment were suspected to operate in the Iron Triangle.

To strike against this enemy force, II Field Force organized the single largest ground operation of the American war in Vietnam involving the equivalent of three US divisions, some 30,000 US and South Vietnamese troops. The US units involved were the 1st and 25th Infantry Division, the 196th Infantry Brigade, the 173rd Airborne Brigade, as well as the 11th Armored Cavalry Regiment. Throughout the operation these units were supposed to bear the brunt of the fighting; South Vietnamese troops were planned to search villages in the region, perform logistical tasks, as well as organizing the deportation of the civilian population.

As often during the Vietnam War, the terrain of the area of operations constituted a major problem for military planners. Indeed, the reason why the VC were able to establish the Iron Triangle as a major sanctuary was that its terrain made it difficult for larger military forces to access this region. Therefore, another major aim of the operation was to destroy large parts of the vegetation through defoliants and bulldozers in order to make the Iron Triangle more easily accessible for future operations.

=== Battle plan ===
Operation Cedar Falls was planned as a "hammer and anvil" operation. Under the cloak of deceptive deployments on seemingly routine operations, the 25th Infantry Division with the 196th Infantry Brigade attached to it was to assume blocking positions west of the Iron Triangle, along the Saigon River, while one brigade of the 1st Infantry Division was assigned the same task along the Thi Tinh River east of the area of operations. The remaining units were then supposed to "hammer" the VC against this "anvil" by rapidly moving through the Iron Triangle, scouring it for enemy troops and installations, and clearing it of civilians. A tight encirclement of the area was to prevent communist units from retreating.

Operation Cedar Falls was scheduled to begin on 5 January 1967, when weather conditions were most favorable. It was divided into two distinct phases. During preparatory phase I, 5-9 January, the "anvil" was set up by positioning the relevant units along the Iron Triangle's flank, and an air assault on Bến Súc, a key fortified VC village, was to take place on 8 January (D-day). These operations were to be succeeded by the completion of the area's encirclement as well as a concerted drive of American forces through the Iron Triangle (the "hammer") from both the south and the west in phase II.

== Battle ==
=== Phase I ===
==== Positioning forces and the assault on Bến Súc ====
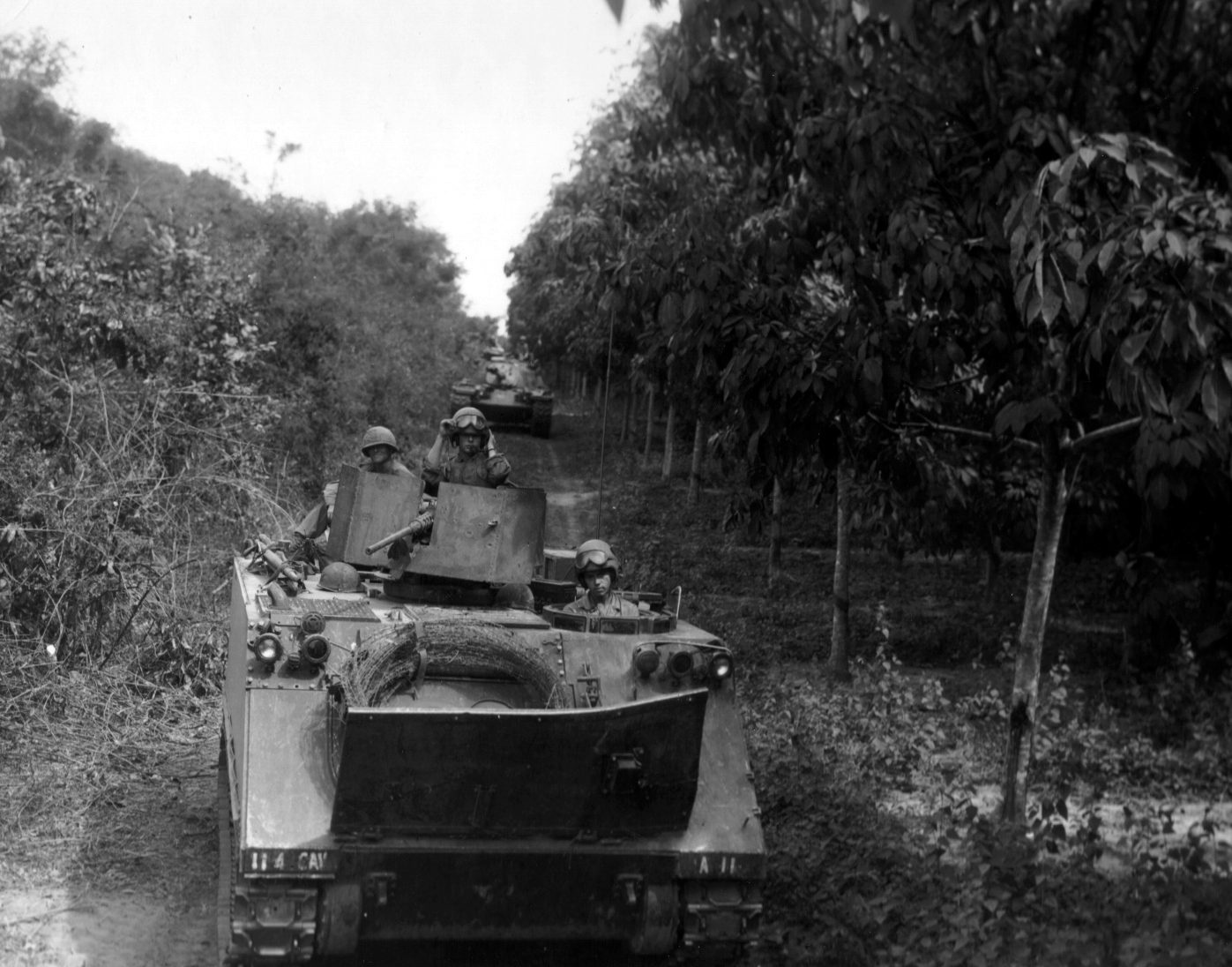
United States Army M113 and M48A3 tank deploy along a road between the jungle and rubber plantation.

Starting on 5 January, blocking forces assumed their positions to south of the Iron Triangle along the Saigon River (the 25th Infantry Division and the 196th Infantry Brigade) and east of it (1st Infantry Division) to set up the anvil. On D-day, finally, elements of the 1st Infantry Division's 2d Brigade commenced the planned air assault on the village of Bến Súc.

Bến Súc was the main pillar of the VC's dominance over the Iron Triangle. This fortified village was supply and political center with its population organized as rear service companies. Achieving tactical surprise, American forces were able to encircle and seal off the village against light resistance. A South Vietnamese battalion was then flown in to search the village and interrogate its inhabitants. A complex tunnel and storage system was uncovered and large quantities of supplies were obtained and later destroyed. The allied forces were able to arrest only lower ranking VC military or political personnel.

Following the village's screening, 106 villagers were detained; the remaining inhabitants of Bến Súc and of surrounding villages, some 6,000 individuals, two-thirds of them children, were deported, along with their belongings and livestock, in trucks, river boats and helicopters to relocation camps. After the deportation of the village's population, Bến Súc was erased by USAECV engineers who burned the village to the ground and then leveled their remnants as well as the surrounding vegetation using bulldozers. To collapse tunnels too deep for the demolition teams to find and crush, the village was then subjected to heavy air bombardment.

General Bernard Rogers, who served as assistant division commander of the 1st Infantry Division during Operation Cedar Falls, notes that, during the forced evacuation of Bến Súc, inhabitants were "moved as humanely as possible", were allowed to take their possessions and livestock with them, and were even given medical treatment. He concedes that "It was to be expected that uprooting the natives of these villages would evoke resentment, and it did"; he goes on to describe the "sight of the natives of Bến Súc with their carts, chickens, hogs, rice" as "pathetic and pitiful." He reports grave difficulties occurring during the inhabitants' resettlement to the village of Phu Loi. He quotes Westmoreland as having said "Unfortunately, the resettlement phase was not as well planned or executed as the actual evacuation. For the first few days the families suffered unnecessary hardships." When interviewed more than 15 years later, one resident of the village recalled how they were not allowed to take anything from their homes, and how, from the very start of the operation, the army killed villagers. Journalist Jonathan Schell, who wrote an extensive article on the operation for The New Yorker, confirms the government's assessments. Those South Vietnamese officials, who were charged with the relocation of the villagers, were not informed of their task to organize a refugee camp until 24 hours before the forced evacuation began. As a result, the surprised inhabitants of Phu Loi were forced to house the deportees from Bến Súc in their overcrowded dwellings.

=== Phase II ===
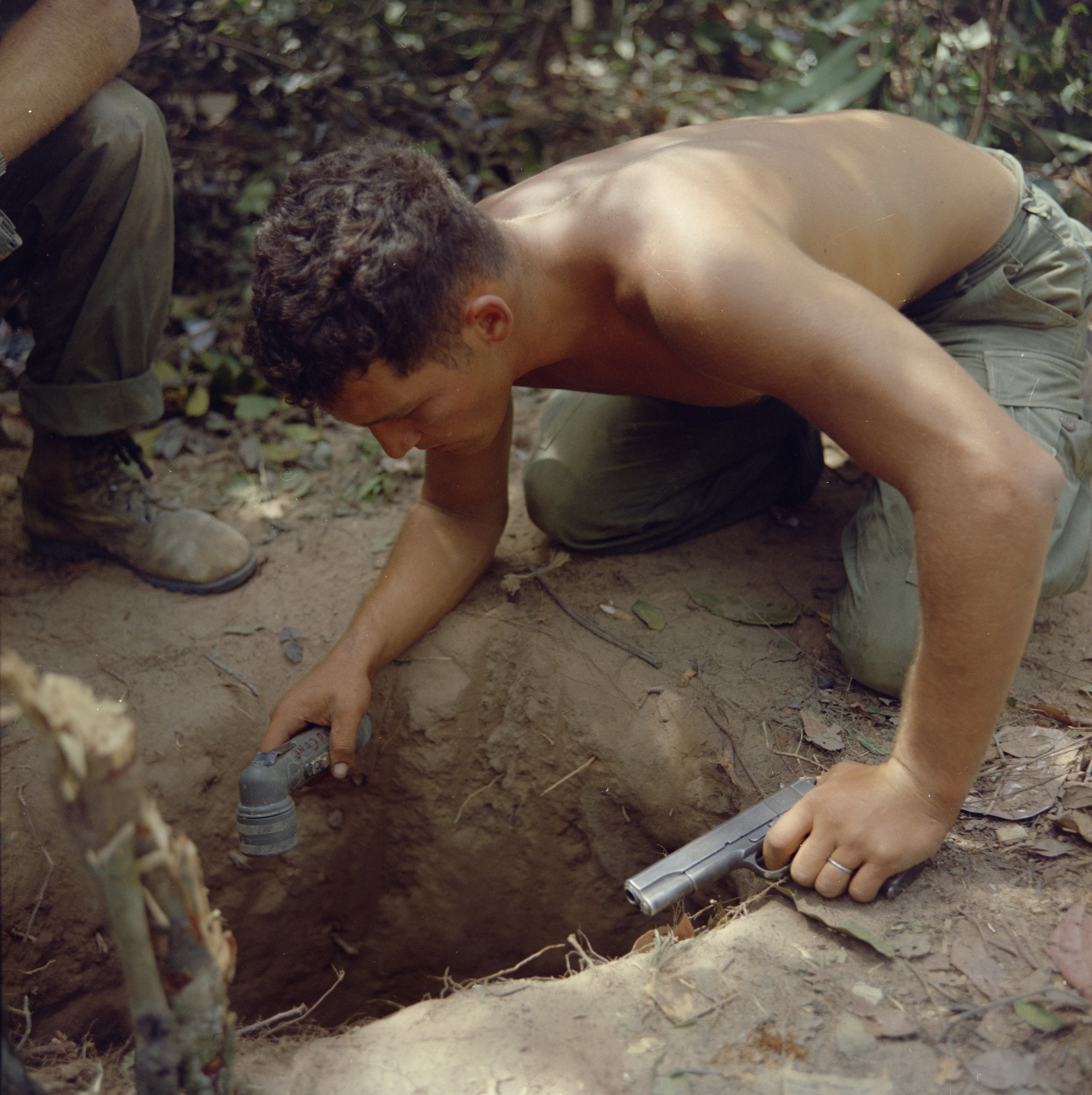
An infantryman checks a tunnel entrance during Operation Cedar Falls

With phase I largely completed, US forces initiated phase II. Following saturation bombing and artillery fire, elements of the 1st Infantry Division along with the 173rd Airborne Brigade and the 11th Armored Cavalry Regiment began their massive thrust into the Iron Triangle, first cutting the area into half and then conducting a thorough search which covered the entire area of responsibility as Seaman had demanded. The blocking forces of the 25th Infantry Division and of the attached 196th Infantry Brigade conducted search and destroy operations west of the Saigon River and sealed the river by patrolling it on open boats.

This massive military punch largely encountered air. Perhaps forewarned or anticipating the attack, the VC had chosen to evade allied forces by fleeing across the border into Cambodia or hiding in complex underground systems. One of the largest military ground operations since the Korean War and the single largest ground operation of the War in Vietnam was characterized by skirmishes and other small unit actions rather than large-scale combat. Allied troops were overwhelmingly engaged in extensive searches and patrolling during daytime and ambushing during the night; casualties were suffered primarily from sniper fire, land mines, and booby traps.

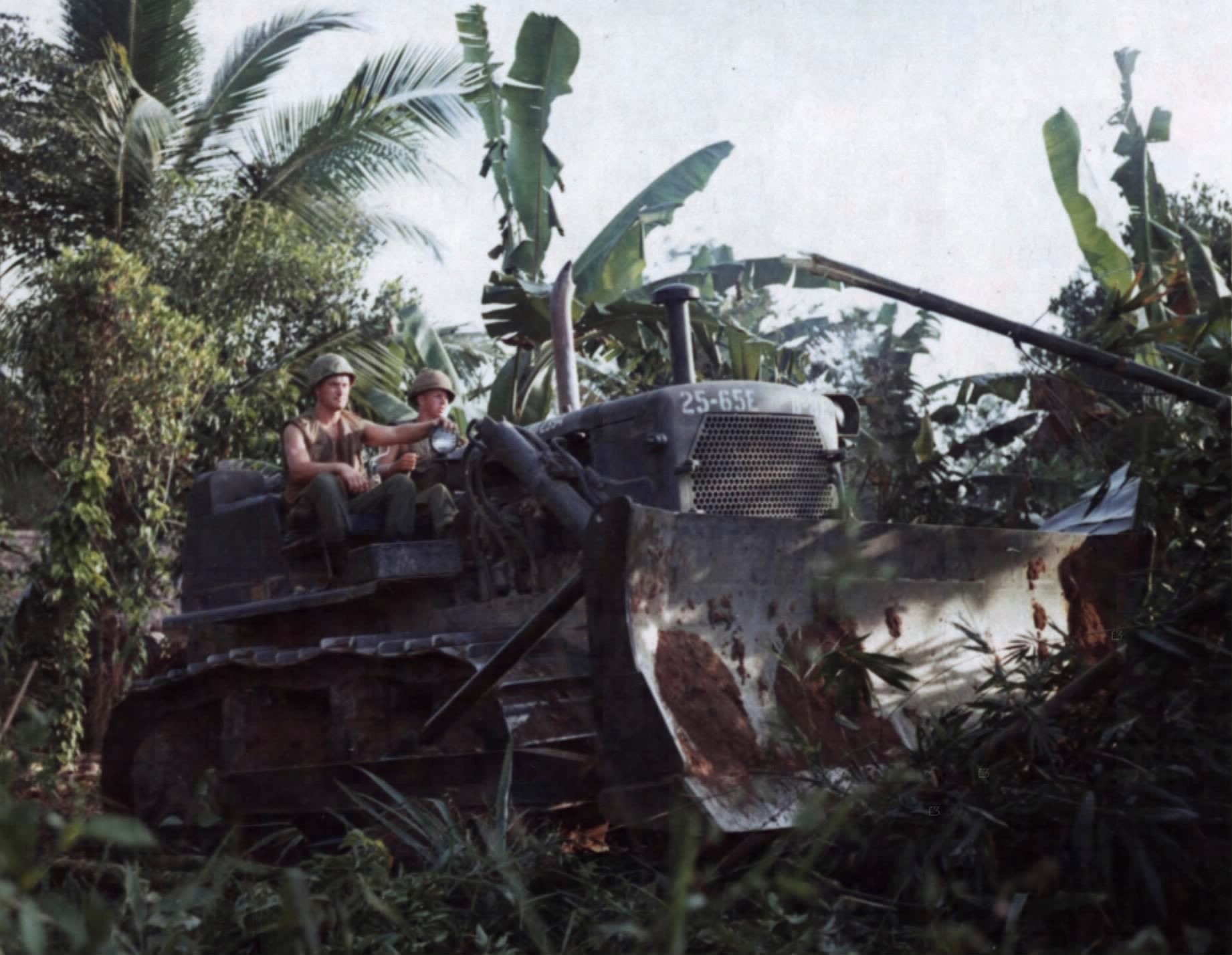
B Company, 65th Engineer Battalion clear vegetation from around the town of Phu Hoa Dong with a D-7 bulldozer, 26 January

While allied forces thus failed to search and destroy significant contingents of enemy forces, they did manage to uncover parts of the VC's complex tunnel system where large amounts of VC supplies and documents were found. In order to infiltrate these vast underground complexes, the US military used specifically trained teams (so-called "tunnel rats") for the first time in the war. After having been searched, tunnel complexes were destroyed using a combination of acetylene gas and conventional demolition charges.

A significant part of the operation was also characterized by large-scale combat engineering and chemical operations. Tankdozers, bulldozers, and Rome plows were used by USAECV in jungle-clearing operations in which enemy held terrain was cleared of its vegetation in order to conduct search-and-destroy operations and to destroy enemy installments. Chemicals were used to defoliate parts of the area and to contaminate enemy rice supplies that American forces were unable to remove.

== Results and aftermath ==
=== Casualties ===
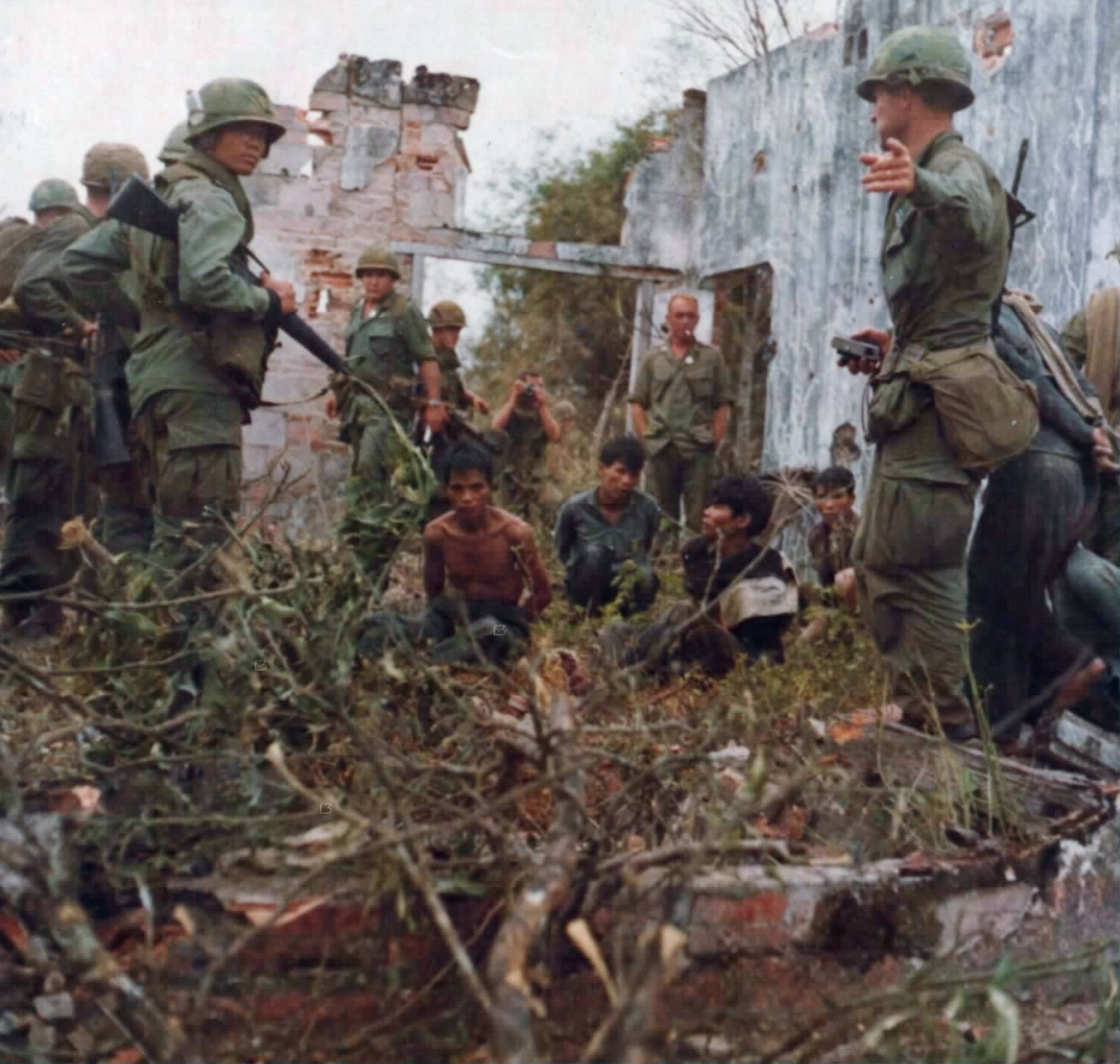
Men of the 2nd Battalion, 503rd Airborne Infantry, 173rd Airborne Brigade guard VC prisoners captured in the Thanh Dien Forest

The operation was officially terminated on 26 January 1967. The American military claimed that in its course almost 750 VC were killed, 280 were taken prisoner, and 540 defected in the Chieu Hoi ("open-arms") program; an additional 512 suspects were detained and almost 6,000 individuals were deported. Moreover, allied forces captured 23 crew-served weapons, 590 individual weapons, over 2,800 explosive items, 60,000 rounds of small arms ammunition, and enough rice to feed 13,000 troops for an entire year. Also, large numbers of enemy documents were obtained, and a massive complex of tunnels, bunkers, and other structures was destroyed. Some 100 bunkers, 25 tunnels, and over 500 structures were destroyed. Finally, in order to deny the VC cover and make future penetrations of the area simpler, eleven square kilometers of jungle were cleared.

In comparison, Allied losses were light. US forces lost 72 killed and 337 wounded, while South Vietnamese casualties amounted to 11 killed and 8 wounded. U.S. equipment lost included two tanks and five armored personnel carriers destroyed; damage was sustained by three tanks, nine APC's, one tankdozer, two jeeps and two light observation helicopters. The VC claimed to have inflicted more than 3,000 casualties on the Allied units and forced the operation to a halt. According to North Vietnam/Viet Cong, they suffered ~1,000 casualties (one half were civillian)

Whether these casualty figures were solely enemy combatants during this operation is questioned by first-hand observer and embedded journalist Jonathan Schell, writing for The New Yorker. During the assault on villages around Bến Súc, villagers not explicitly following ARVN orders to amass for evacuation were to be declared VC. He was told of the shooting of unarmed individuals include a man riding his bicycle too quickly past a patrol, a woman carrying surgical and medical supplies allegedly wearing VC uniform, three civilians crossing on a rafter, whom were all subsequently declared as VC, with US forces not discerning whether they were combatants or not. In the villages of Rach Kien, Bung Cong, and Rach Bap, all were declared free-fire zones as villagers were declared VC and hostile civilians captured were classified as Chieu Hoi or detainees.

=== The Iron Triangle after January 1967 ===
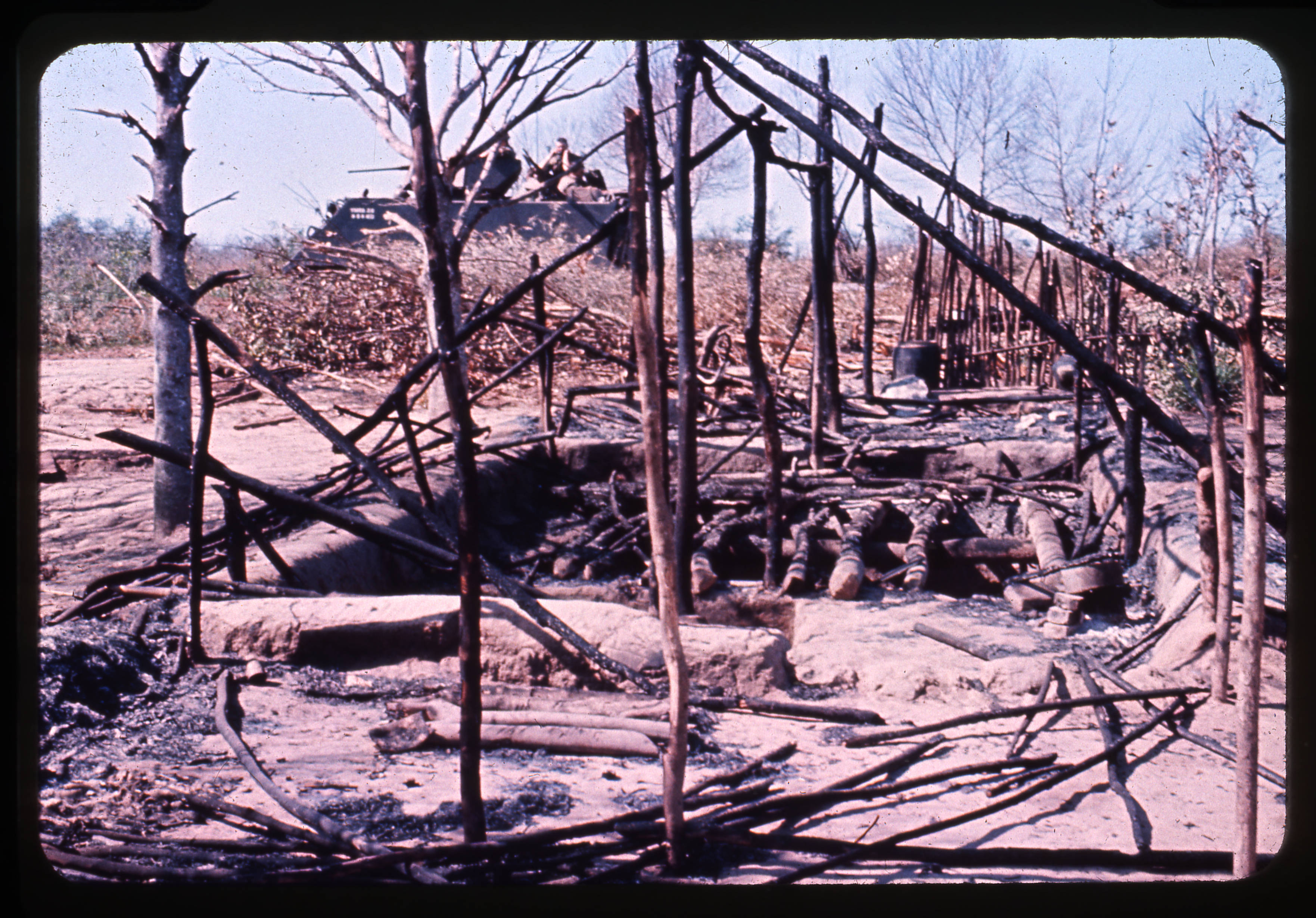
Destroyed Vietnamese house, January 1967

Even though the VC suffered a serious setback, its members swiftly managed to reestablish their domination over the Iron Triangle. Two days after the operation's termination, VC forces reentered the Iron Triangle, and within ten days the area was, according to an official US report, "literally crawling with what appeared to be Vietcong." Only a year after the termination of Operation Cedar Falls, the VC used this area as a staging ground for their attacks on Saigon during the 1968 Tet Offensive. Moreover, both inside the Iron Triangle as well as in the relocation camps, to which the inhabitants of Bến Súc were deported, measures such as saturation bombing and in particular the deportation of the civilian population caused tremendous resentment. Following the operation, the VC thus returned to an area in which local peasants were more hostile of the allies and more supportive of the VC than they had been prior to the occupation.

=== Assessment ===
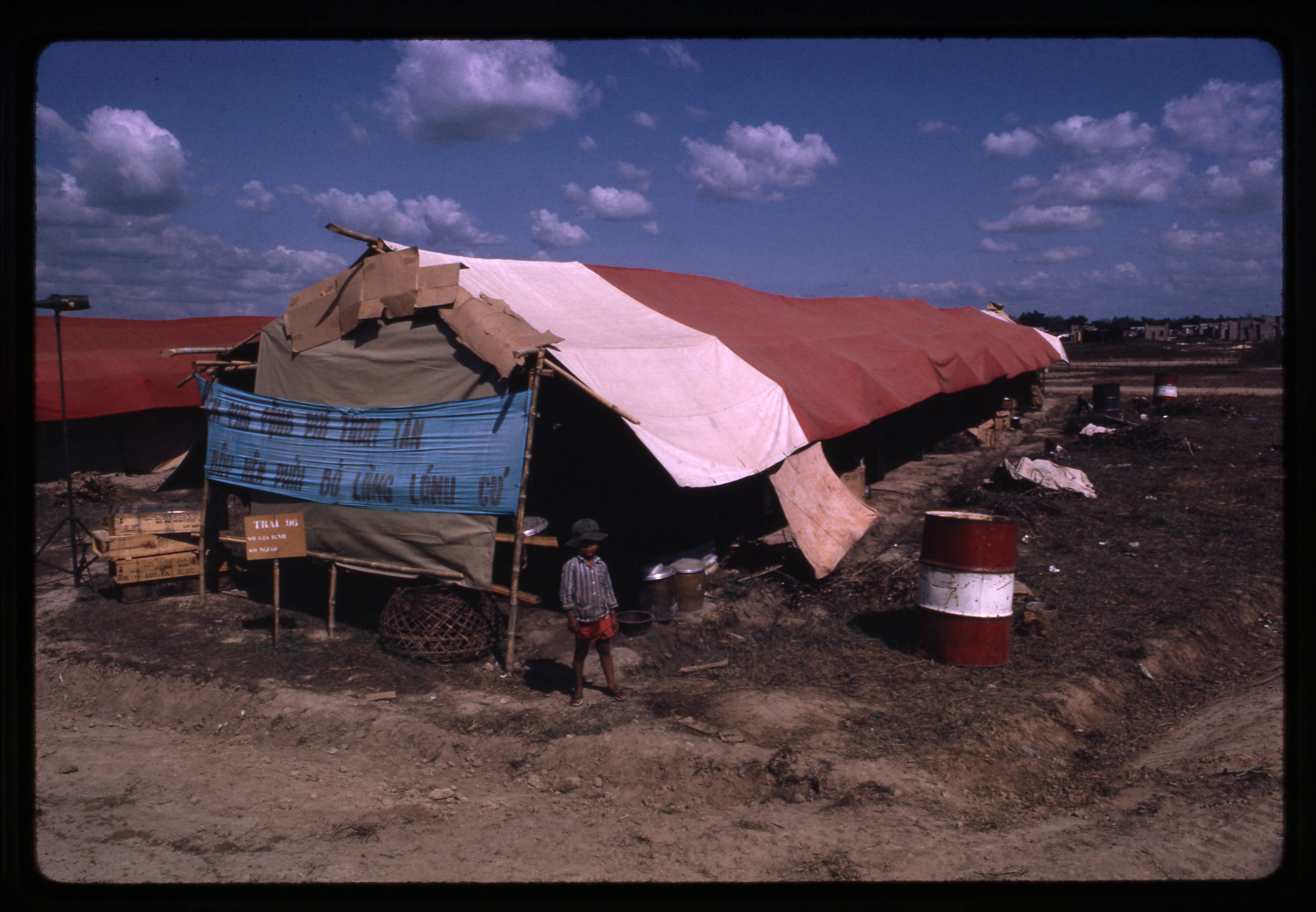
Refugee tent near Phu Loi Base Camp, 29 January 1967

Senior US commanders involved were convinced that this operation had been an unqualified success. According to Rogers, Westmoreland thought that it was "very impressive in its results". Summarizing the effects on the enemy, Seaman argued that the enemy's offensive capabilities had been disrupted. Moreover, he predicted that the losses suffered by the VC would have a "serious psychological impact" on "the VC-dominated populace" and that they now would have to "re-evaluate the relative capabilities of their forces as opposed to ours." General William DePuy, then commander of the 1st Infantry Division, noted a "complete breakdown in confidence and morale on the part of the VC" and called Cedar Falls a "decisive turning point in the III Corps area; a tremendous boost of morale of the Vietnamese Government and Army; and a blow from which the VC in this area may never recover."

In the literature on the Vietnam War, the operation is evaluated much more negatively. Phillip Davidson is one of the few authors who sees it as part of a meaningful broader strategy. While he concedes that it missed some of its short-term goals, he holds that, along with its follow-up Operation Junction City, it had beneficial long term strategic consequences: It dealt a serious blow to the North Vietnamese strategy of protracted guerilla warfare by permanently driving the VC's main force from the more populated areas and across the Cambodian border. This conclusion, however, is contested by Shelby L. Stanton, who noted the same effect as Davidson but interpreted it as detrimental to the American military strategy. Instead of driving the VC into a more "vulnerable posture", as had been intended by MACV, they were in fact driven into Cambodia and hence into a region beyond the allied forces' reach where, together with the PAVN, they established sanctuaries immune to US attacks. In fact, as Davidson also acknowledged, they had demonstrated the capability of recovering and returning to the area within just a few days.

Most authors, though, focus on the short-term outcome of the operation. They argue that, for all its impressive statistics, the operation failed to achieve its primary goal: Whereas it did deal a serious blow to the VC, communist forces swiftly reestablished their dominant position in the Iron Triangle. Moreover, the saturation bombing and artillery fire as well as the forced deportation of 6,000 civilians are considered tactics which, in addition to being morally highly questionable, were militarily counterproductive as well. While writing from completely different, if not opposed, political points of view, both journalist Stanley Karnow and political scientist Guenter Lewy cite the deportations as an example of a larger military strategy which deliberately displaced hundreds of thousands of the very people the US claimed to defend and thus alienated them from the South Vietnamese regime and their American allies.

Some authors therefore see the operation as a prime example of what they consider as the fundamental misconceptions of America's military commitment in Southeast Asia as well as of the moral ambiguities or even outright atrocities caused by it; one author even cites the operation as an example of how not to wage an asymmetric war.

== Media portrayal ==
A 2025 Vietnamese movie titled Tunnel: Sun in the Dark (Địa đạo: Mặt trời trong bóng tối) by Bùi Thạc Chuyên with main plot based on Operation Cedar Falls. The film depicts the lives of guerilla fighters and villagers resisting the operation.
