= Sapper Leader Course =

United States Army training course

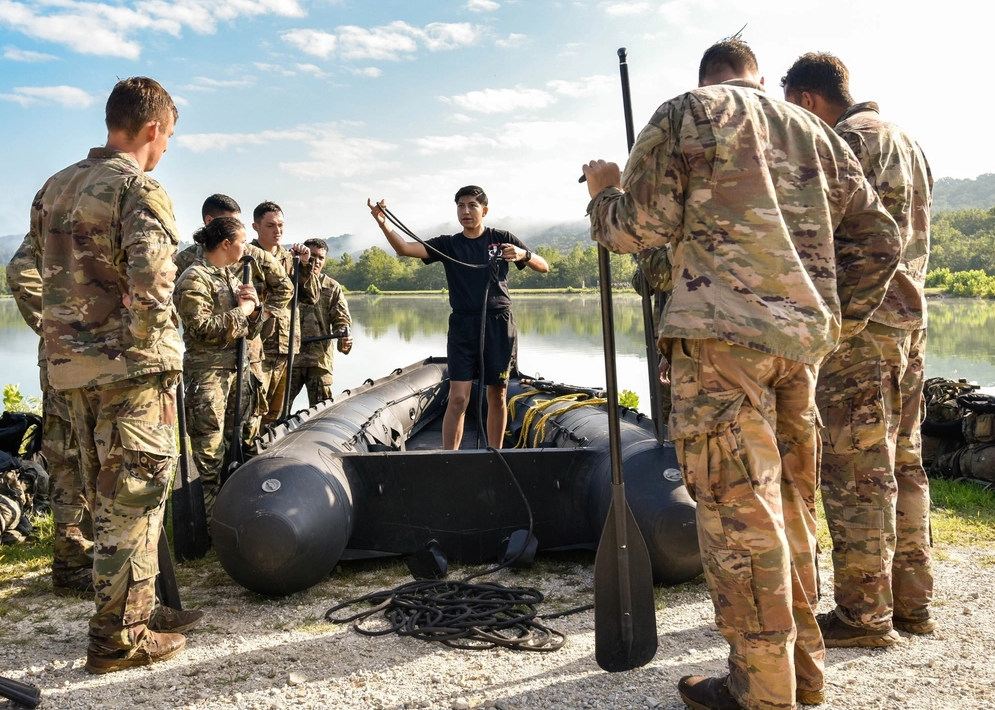
- A Sapper Instructor instructs students during the boat rigging event.
- Active: 1985–present
- Country: United States
- Branch: United States Army
- Type: Military training
- Role: Special skills training
- Part of: 169th Engineer Battalion, 1st Engineer Brigade, United States Army Engineer School
- Garrison/HQ: Fort Leonard Wood, Missouri
- Motto: "Earn The Right!"

Insignia
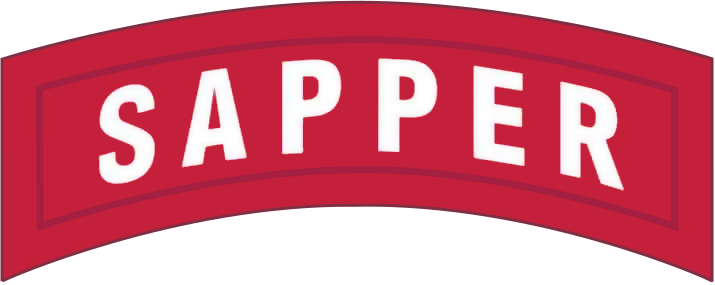
- Sapper Tab awarded upon graduation

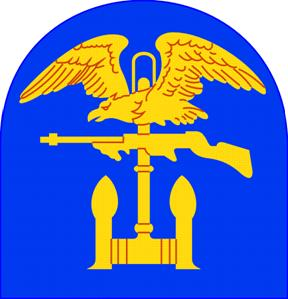
- Shoulder sleeve insignia of the 1st Engineer Brigade

Earning the Sapper Tab (2:11)
Official U.S. Army video about the Sapper Leader Course (2012)

The Sapper Leader Course is a 28-day United States Army small unit tactics and leadership course that develops soldiers in critical skills and teaches advanced combat engineer techniques needed across the Army. Sapper training began development in 1982, and continued until 1985. The course is broken down into two, two-week phases, General Subjects, and Patrolling. The Sapper Leader course is viewed as the engineer equivalent to the US Army Ranger School, a school traditionally associated with and attended primarily by light infantry soldiers.

== Overview ==
The Sapper Leader Course is open to U.S. military personnel from the Army, Marine Corps, Navy, Air Force, and Space Force, as well as selected students from other nations allied with the United States. The course is conducted at Fort Leonard Wood, Missouri; organized under the 169th Engineer Battalion, 1st Engineer Brigade, United States Army Engineer School.

Those graduating from the Sapper Leader Course are presented with the Sapper Tab, which is worn on the upper shoulder of the left sleeve of a military uniform, according to U.S. Army regulations Wearing the tab is permitted for the remainder of a soldier's military career. The cloth version of the tab is worn on the Army Combat Uniform and Army Green Service Uniform; a smaller, metal version is worn on the Army Service Uniform.

== History ==
The history of Sappers within the United States Military dates back to 1778, when Congress authorized three companies within the Continental Army to be designated as "Sapper and Miner" companies. Historically, Sappers have assumed the role of combat engineers who advance with the front-line infantry. They played a pivotal role in securing Omaha Beach during D-Day, clearing beach obstacles to allow American Forces to advance.

In 1982, design had begun upon what would become the Sapper Leader Course. It lasted until May 1985, when the validation class was conducted. On June 14, 1985, the first 18 Sapper Leaders graduated. The initial course cadre consisted of soldiers with combat engineer, infantry, and special forces military occupational specialties. At this time, the course was divided into four phases: the confidence phase, the engineering phase, the battle drill phase, and the STX phase.

In 1986, the Sapper Leader Course executed a Mobile Training Team Class at Fort AP Hill, Virginia. This class was primarily for members of the 229th Engineer Battalion of the Virginia Army National Guard. Retired Lieutenant General David E. Grange Jr. was the guest speaker for the graduation.

During the Course's design an accouterment was suggested for Graduates, in the form of a badge much like the Airborne or Air Assault Badge. The idea was dropped due to it being a unit course. The idea gained traction again in late 1987 with the help of LTG Grange's letter to the Secretary of the Army in August 1987. The idea stayed stagnant for several years until the course completed full accreditation by Training and Doctrine Command. In 2004 Lieutenant General Robert B. Flowers, at the time the Chief of Engineers, was able to gain enough traction to get the accouterment approved by Army Chief of Staff General Peter Schoomaker in the form of the "Sapper Tab". The Sapper Tab was authorized for permanent wear 28 June 2004.

In 2005, the US Army Corps of Engineers launched the Inaugural Best Sapper Competition, equivalent to the Best Ranger Competition. The Best Sapper Competition has been conducted annually, except in 2013 and 2014 due to funding complications, and in 2020 due to the COVID-19 pandemic. In 2018 the competition was renamed to the Lieutenant General Robert B. Flowers Best Sapper Competition.

In 2011, Discovery Channel documentary series Surviving the Cut produced an episode covering the school.

== Students ==
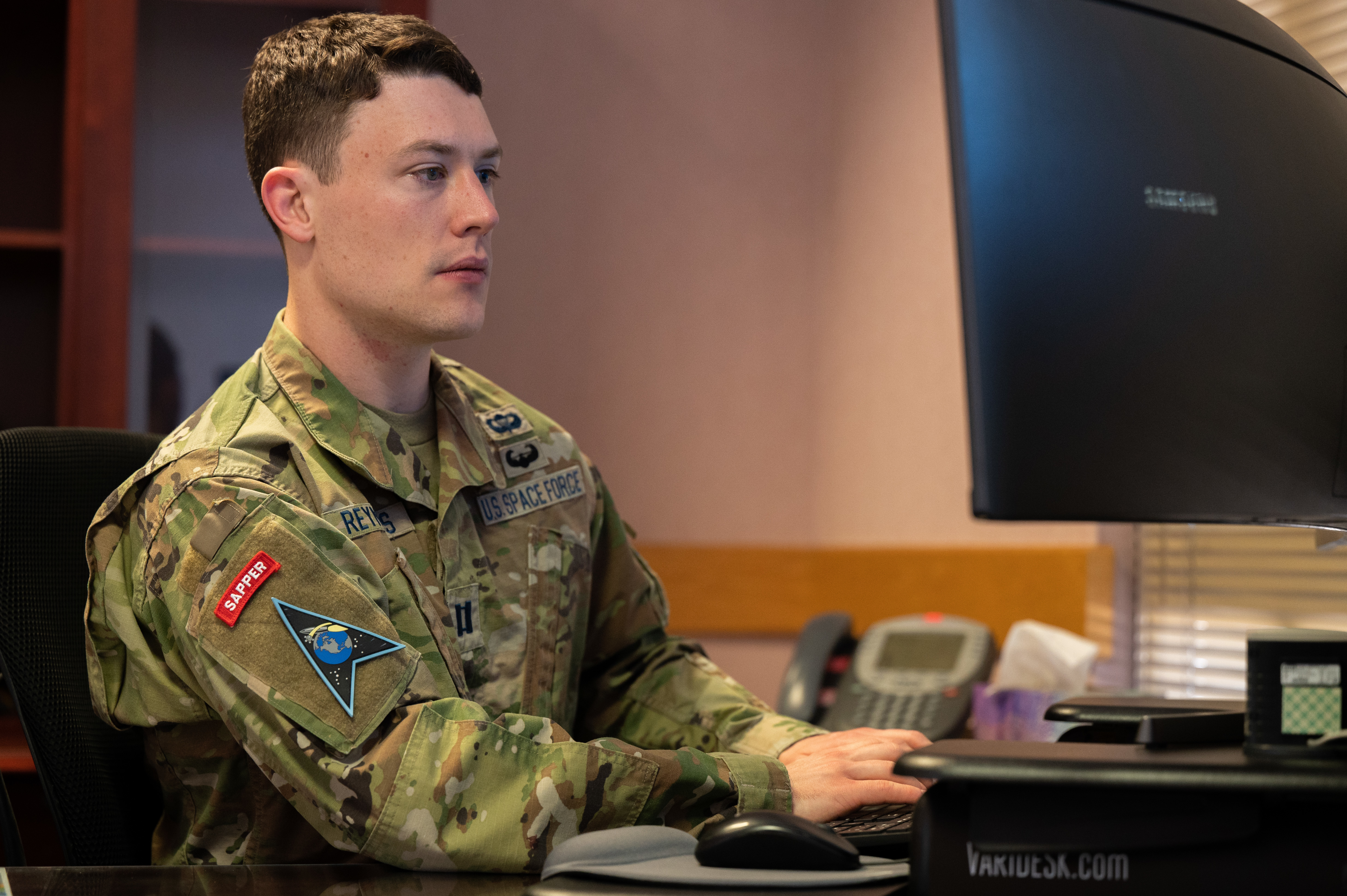
Captain Daniel Reynolds received recognition as the first member of the US Space Force to graduate from the course.

The Sapper Leader Course is open to all members of the United States Armed Forces. Sapper students come from units in the United States Army, Marine Corps, Air Force, Navy, Coast Guard, cadets attending the United States Military Academy, and from foreign military services. The two largest groups of attendees for the Sapper Leader Course are from the U.S. Army's Engineer Basic Officer Leadership Course (EBOLC), and enlisted members of Engineer units. Competitions and pre-Sapper courses are typically used to determine attendance.

Eligibility requirements are as follows

Army-Active, Reserve and National Guard Components:

- 12B, 12C and 12N - E4 through E7 (E3 and E8 with an approved rank waiver)
- 12A - O1 through O3

Marine Corps- Active and Reserve Components

- 1371 - E4 through E7
- 1302 - O1 and O2

All other personnel are required to obtain a waiver.

In June 1999 CDT Micala Hicks, of the United States Military Academy, became the first female service member to graduate from the Sapper Leader Course. At the time of her graduation, female soldiers were not allowed into combat military occupational specialties, or into courses of similar nature, such as Ranger School. In December 2018, Sergeant Hailey Falk became the first female enlisted graduate. The Combat Engineer MOS was not open to female soldiers until 2015, although many wanted to attend the course they did not meet the entrance requirements of the time. 326 females had attended by that date, but only 110 had graduated.

== Training ==
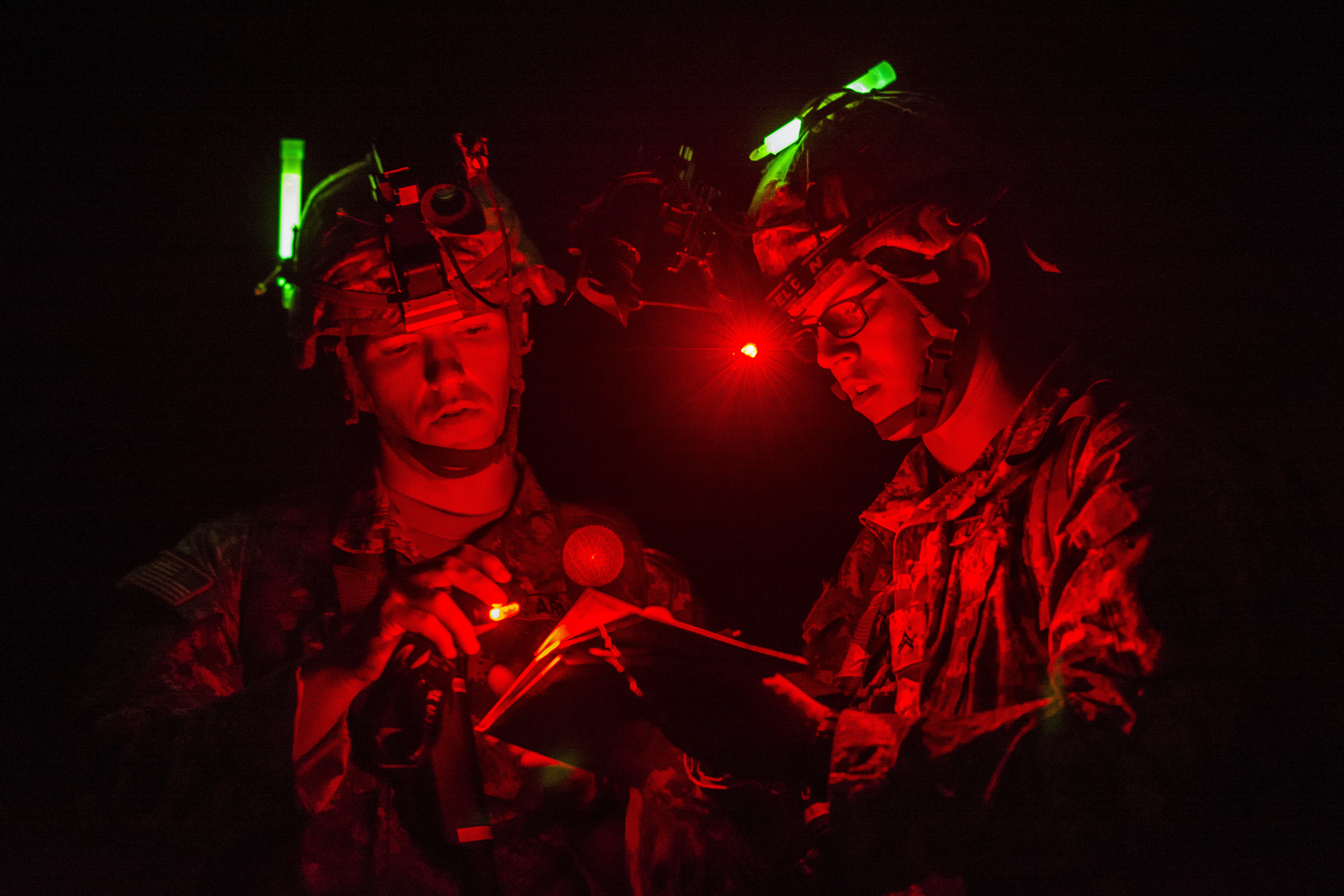
Soldiers from the 374th Engineer Company (Sapper) participate in a two-week field exercise to determine eligibility for attendance to the Sapper Leader Course

The purpose of the course is to train combat engineers in leadership skills, combat engineer and infantry battle drills, and specialized engineer and infantry techniques required to perform as members of a Combined Arms Task Force; to build unit cohesion and increase the confidence of the unit's leadership. This is executed through training from the squad level to the company level. Training is conducted in a team building environment to build leadership skills, learn specialized engineer techniques, and perform battle drills necessary to perform the engineer missions of a Sapper Company. The course is also designed to build unit cohesion and esprit de corps by training the Soldiers in mobility, counter-mobility, and survivability tasks to include troop leading procedures, demolitions (conventional and expedient), mountaineering operations, aerial operations, airborne operations, foreign weapons, land navigation, waterborne operations, and contingency threat. The course culminates in an intense field training exercise that integrates the technical skills learned throughout the course in a tactical environment.

Similar to Ranger School, a course taught by instructors known as Ranger Instructors (RI), the Sapper Leader Course is taught by Sapper Instructors (SI). These instructors use past experience as well as course curriculum to train tactical, physical, leadership and engineering skills.

On the first day of attendance at the course, known as Day 0, all Sapper students must complete the Sapper Physical Fitness Test. This three event test is graded IAW current Army Combat Fitness Test guidelines, and consists of the following events:

- Hand release pushups, minimum 30 reps
- Leg tucks, minimum 5 reps
- 3 Mile run in under 24 minutes.

All students unable to complete the Sapper Physical Fitness Test will not be admitted further into the course. In the FY 22, this accounted for 18% of all drops from the course.

Following this, students are admitted into the course and further training is organized into two phases: General Subjects, and Patrolling

=== General Subjects ===
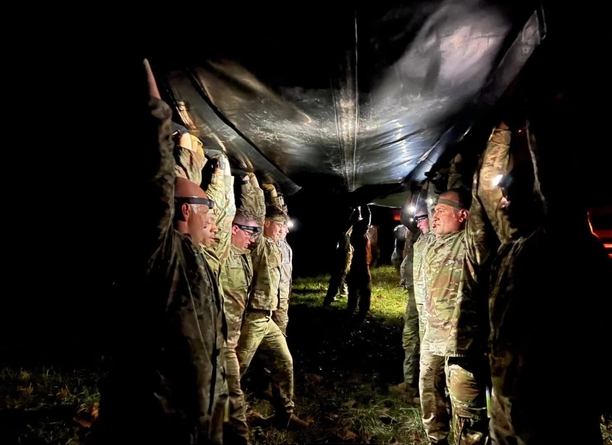
Sapper Students conduct physical training using a zodiac boatcraft

This phase lasts 13 days and covers the following training:

- Physical Training
- Engineer Recon
- Mobility / Counter-Mobility
- Engagement Area Development
- Demolitions Training (conventional and expedient)
- Urban Breaching
- Threat Ordnance
- Land Navigation
- Knots and Rigging
- Air Operations (aerial resupply and landing zone, pick-zone, and drop zone operations)
- Mountaineering
- Water Operations (scout swimming, boat operations, river crossings, and helocasting techniques).

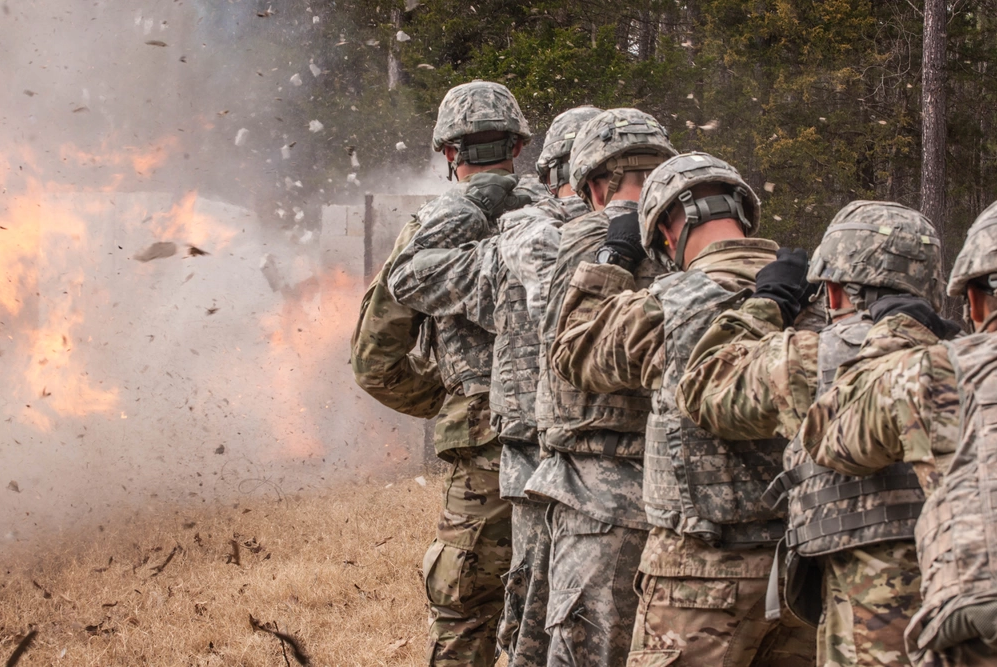
A Sapper Leader Course squad detonates a silhouette charge to create an entrance through a wall during urban breaching exercises as part of the course.

Since students do not have to be combat engineers to attend the course, emphasis is placed on demolitions to ensure all students have a working knowledge. Calculations and placements are taught using sample problems, as well as two days at a range making field-expedient demolitions from materials that students may be limited to in real world situations. Similar to Ranger School, the course covers mountain operations. All students are taught common knots used in mountaineering and graded on properly tying these. They apply this knowledge to practical exercises, using a rappel tower, and cliffsides. Students are also given an introductory course on air operations, which focuses on landing and pickup zone setup as well as Air Assault and Airborne operations. They are then tasked to guide an aircraft into a landing zone.

=== Patrolling ===
This phase lasts for 15 days. It includes basic patrolling techniques and battle drills that place strong emphasis on troop-leading procedures, battle drills, planning for operations, and small-unit operations. It incorporates the technical skills learned in GS into a tactical environment. Training includes:

- Patrol Organization and Movement
- Intelligence
- Recon/Raid/Ambush
- Operation Order
- Warning Order
- Fragmentary Order
- MOUT
- Breaching Tenants
- Troop Leading Procedures
- 8 Day Field Training Exercise

This phase begins with 3 days of classroom instruction, which focuses on troop-leading procedures, patrolling fundamentals, and applying the knowledge covered in the general subjects phase. During this phase, sleep and food deprivation occur. Many nights, students get as little as thirty minutes of sleep, with the possibility of no sleep depending on student performance.

The final 10 days of the course consist of a continuous field training exercise. Student leadership is rotated during different phases of the mission which requires students to perform in simulated combat situations to accomplish a variety of missions in a realistic scenario. Students are graded on their ability to apply the principles of patrolling to accomplish the mission. Missions conducted during the STX/FTX are a mix of engineer and infantry missions with a focus on the Engineer tasks (MOB/CMOB/SURV) required to accomplish the mission. Engineer specific missions include: bridge reconnaissance, bridge demolition, road craters, covert complex obstacle breach, urban reconnaissance, and field expedient demolitions. Additionally, as part of the field training exercise, students are taught how to catch, kill, clean, and cook their own meal in the wilderness by catching small game.

=== Additional Training Requirements ===
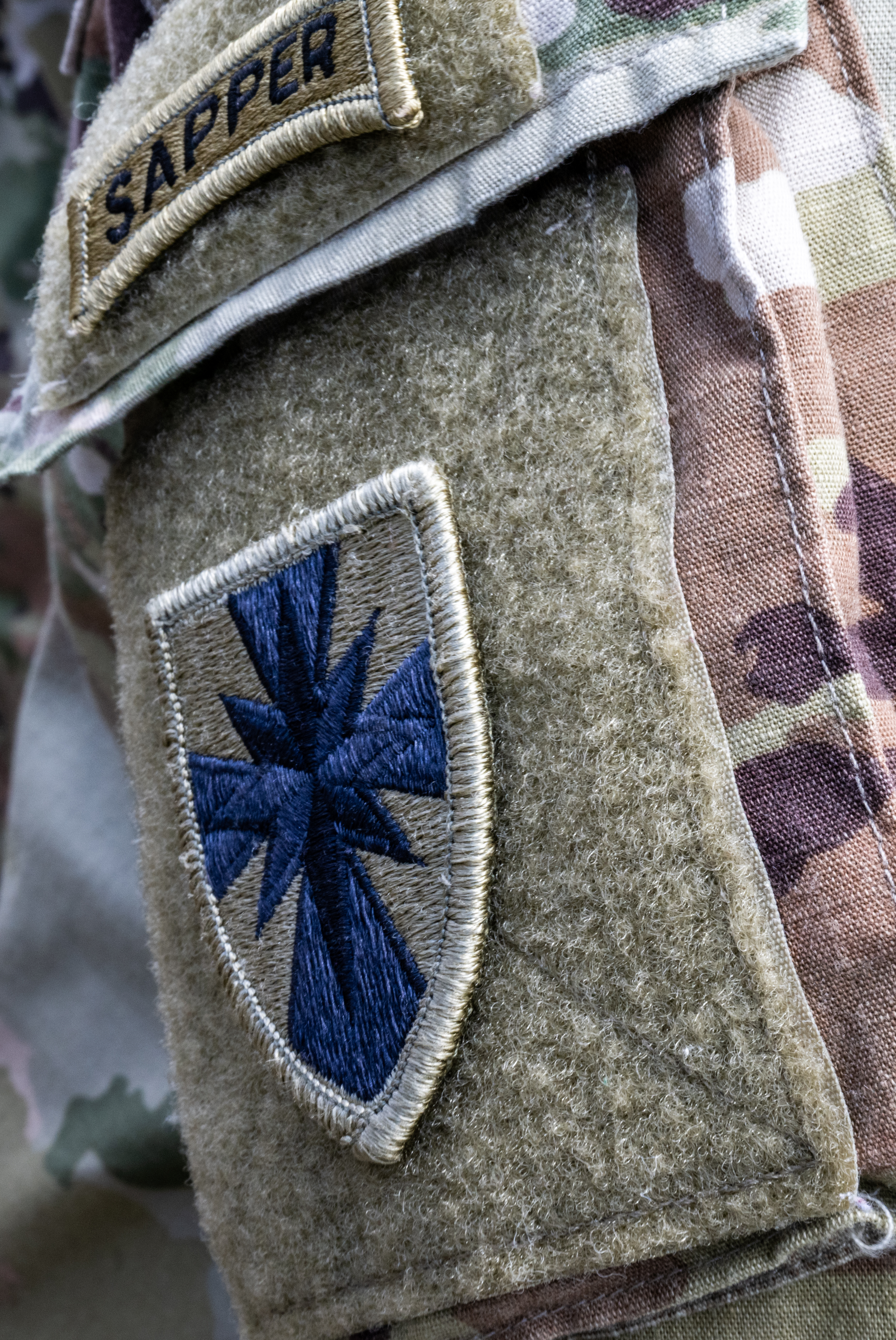
Sapper in 2024

In addition to completing the two phases of training, the following events are considered prerequisite for graduation. They are graded on a GO/NO criteria.

- Day/Night Land Navigation Course
- 12 Mile Road March
- Demolitions Written Exam
- Air Operations Exam
- Engagement Area Development Exam
- Urban Mobility Breaching Exam
- Leadership Grades (Receive go on 50 percent of graded leadership)
- Overall points (Student must have 700 out of 1000 points)
- Participate in all training

The normal training day is from 0500 to 2200 hours, seven days a week. The final phase are continuous 24 hour simulated combat operations.

=== Leadership positions ===
The Sapper Leader Course develops the leadership skills of the students by requiring them to perform effectively as small unit leaders in an austere and realistic tactical environment. During the first phase, the leadership positions are rotated daily. During Phase II, the leadership positions are rotated daily and after each mission. Throughout the course, the "buddy system" is used to instill a spirit of teamwork and cooperation. Each student is responsible for knowing his buddy's location and watching out for his or her welfare. Each student will be evaluated a minimum of two times on leadership during patrolling and must receive a "GO" in one of these evaluations.

=== Grading System ===
Students are graded through an evaluation system to determine graduation eligibility. It is a combination of points and required training events, some of which are retestable. In order to graduate, students must earn 700 out of 1,000 points and achieve a GO on all required events listed above. An initial NO-GO in a required event does not mean immediate dismissal. Students who earn less than the required number of points or fail a required training event still receive a certificate of competition for the course. Students have the opportunity to retake written exams, the 12 mile road march, and the land navigation course, and successful retests can earn them the right to graduate.

=== Recycling ===
As of April 2016, the course implemented policy that all recycle eligible students will automatically be recycled into the next Sapper Leader Course class.

Any first time General Subjects student who earns less than 700 points, fails both opportunities to pass land navigation, or fails both opportunities to pass any written exam will become an automatic General Subjects Recycle. A student can be recycled by the Sapper Command Team to try to prevent a negative DA Form 1059.

Any first time Patrolling student that does not achieve a GO rate while in graded positions will become an automatic Patrolling Recycle. They may be recycled by the Sapper Command Team to prevent a negative 1059.

== See also ==
- Sapper
- Ranger School
- Recondo School
- United States Army Air Assault School
- United States Army Airborne School
- United States Army Reconnaissance and Surveillance Leaders Course
