= Iron Triangle (Vietnam) =

Viet Minh stronghold in the Vietnam War

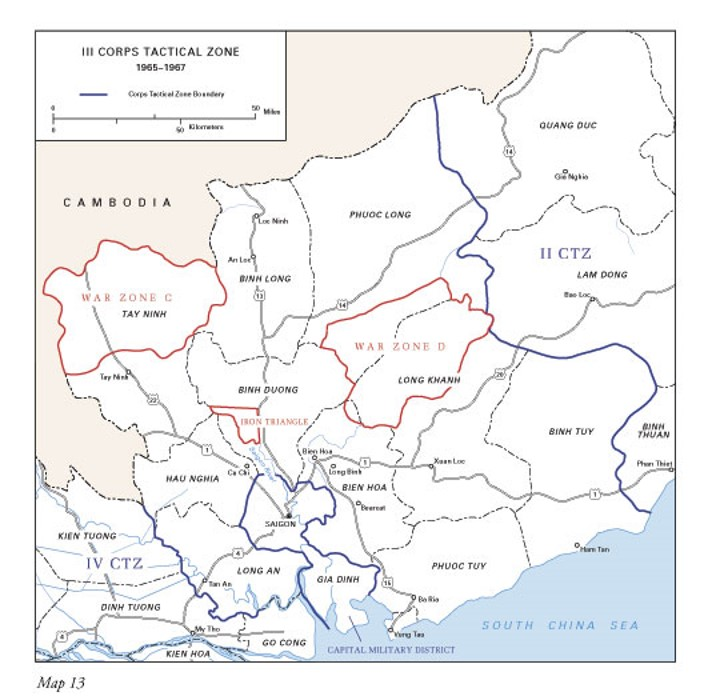
US Army map indicating War Zones C, D, and the Iron Triangle, circa 1965-1967

The Iron Triangle (Vietnamese:Tam Giác Sắt) was a 120 square miles (310 km^{2}) area in the Bình Dương Province of Vietnam, so named due to it being a stronghold of Viet Minh activity during the war. The region was under control of the Viet Minh throughout the French war in Vietnam and continued to be so throughout the phase of American involvement in the Vietnam War, despite concerted efforts on the part of US and South Vietnamese forces to destabilize the region as a power base for their enemy, the communist North Vietnamese–sponsored and–directed South Vietnamese insurgent movement, the Viet Cong (VC).

== Geography ==
The location of the Iron Triangle was between the Saigon River on the west and the Tinh River on the east and bordering Route 13 about 25 miles (40 km) north of Saigon. The southern apex of the "triangle" was seven miles (11 km) from Phú Cường, the capital of Bình Dương Province. Its proximity to Saigon was both a reason for American and South Vietnamese efforts to eradicate it, as well as why it remained a crucial area for Communist forces to control.

The terrain within the Iron Triangle was flat, almost featureless, and covered by dense brush and undergrowth. The clearings, especially in the northern part, were thick with elephant grass, higher than a man's head. The surface was scarred by countless bomb and shell craters so that vehicular movement off the narrow, rough dirt roads was nearly impossible, even tracked vehicles had difficulty. A vast network of tunnels and trenches, most of them caved-in and abandoned, laced this ground that had been the scene of battles since the early days of the second Indochina war.

== History ==
=== The French War ===
During the French war in Indochina, from 1946 to 1954, the Viet Minh elaborated on a network of hidden fortifications and tunnels throughout the region to defend themselves against the superior military power of the French. These tunnel networks had begun as early as the 1880s to resist French occupation. The network afforded communist fighters the ability to "disappear" into the countryside. This became especially important during the Vichy Regime, when Vietnam was dually occupied by French and Japanese forces, so as to remain undetected by not one but two occupying enemies.

=== The Vietnam War ===
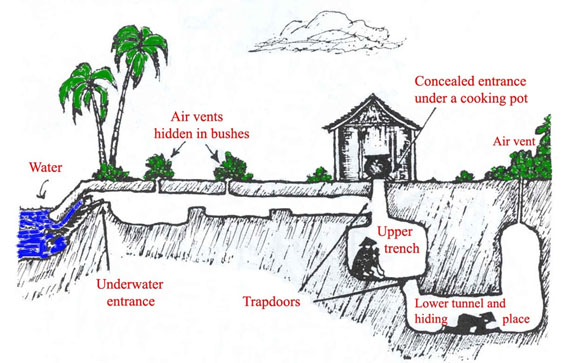
Cross-sectional diagram of Vietcong tunnel system used by the communist insurgents during the Vietnam War

The tunnels were expanded further after the war with the French as a base for underground operations against the Ngo Dinh Diem government and later US-backed South Vietnamese governments. Due to the threat that the base area posed to the Saigon government, the United States stepped up its military offensive in the region in the fall of 1966 and 1967. They launched three operations during this time: Operation Attleboro, Operation Cedar Falls, and Operation Junction City. Operation Cedar Falls was an especially intensive attack involving nearly 16,000 American troops and 14,000 soldiers of the South Vietnamese Army. The operation took nineteen days, and 72 Americans and 720 Viet Cong were killed. Despite their massive attack with B-52 bombers and Rome plows and efforts to destroy the tunnel system with explosives, flooding, and "tunnel rats" (specially trained soldiers who would infiltrate the tunnels armed only with a flashlight and a handgun), the Americans failed to totally destroy the Viet Cong support system that had been built for over two decades.

=== The Iron Triangle at the end of the Vietnam War ===
The area remained an active organizing center for the Viet Cong right through to the end of the war, due to both its undeniable strategic importance, as well as support from local populations who had been negatively impacted by the American bombing campaign. In April 1975, General Văn Tiến Dũng, political bureau members Phạm Hùng and Lê Đức Thọ, and southern military commander Trần Văn Trà all joined in the Iron Triangle region to orchestrate the final, decisive attack on Saigon.
