= 1st Engineer Brigade =

1st Engineer Amphibian Brigade 1st Engineer Special Brigade 1st Engineer Brigade
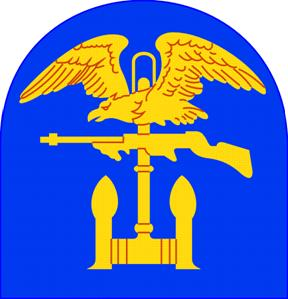
- 1st Engineer Brigade Shoulder Sleeve Insignia
- Active: 1942–1946; 1986–present
- Country: United States
- Branch: United States Army
- Type: Engineer training
- Size: Brigade
- Part of: United States Army Engineer School
- Headquarters: Fort Leonard Wood, Missouri
- Motto: "Put 'Em Across"
- Colors: Red and white
- Engagements: World War II
- Website: 1st Engineer Brigade

Commanders
- Current commander: COL Mike Kieser
- Command Sergeant Major: CSM Jesse Cody

Insignia
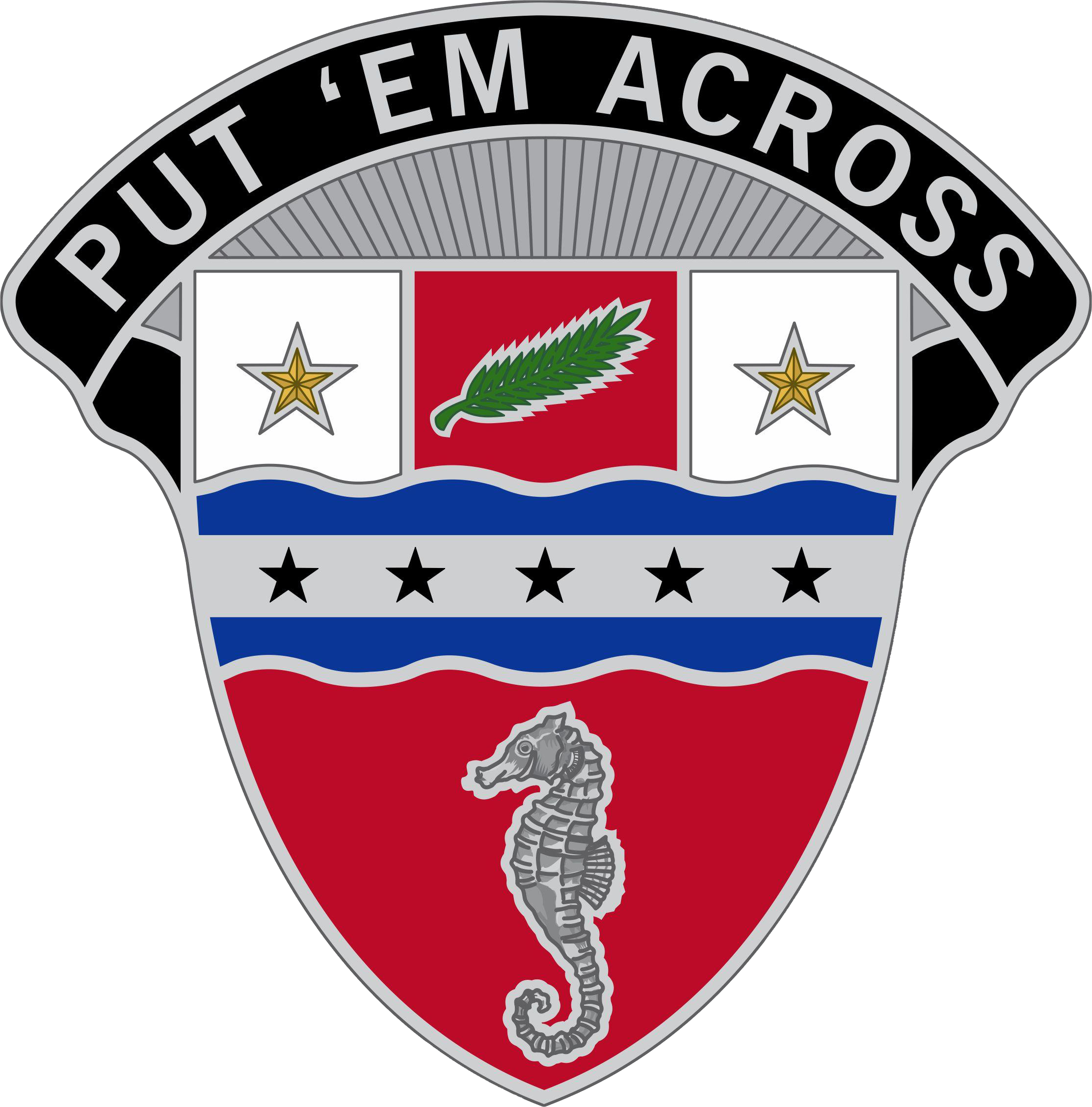
- Distinctive unit insignia

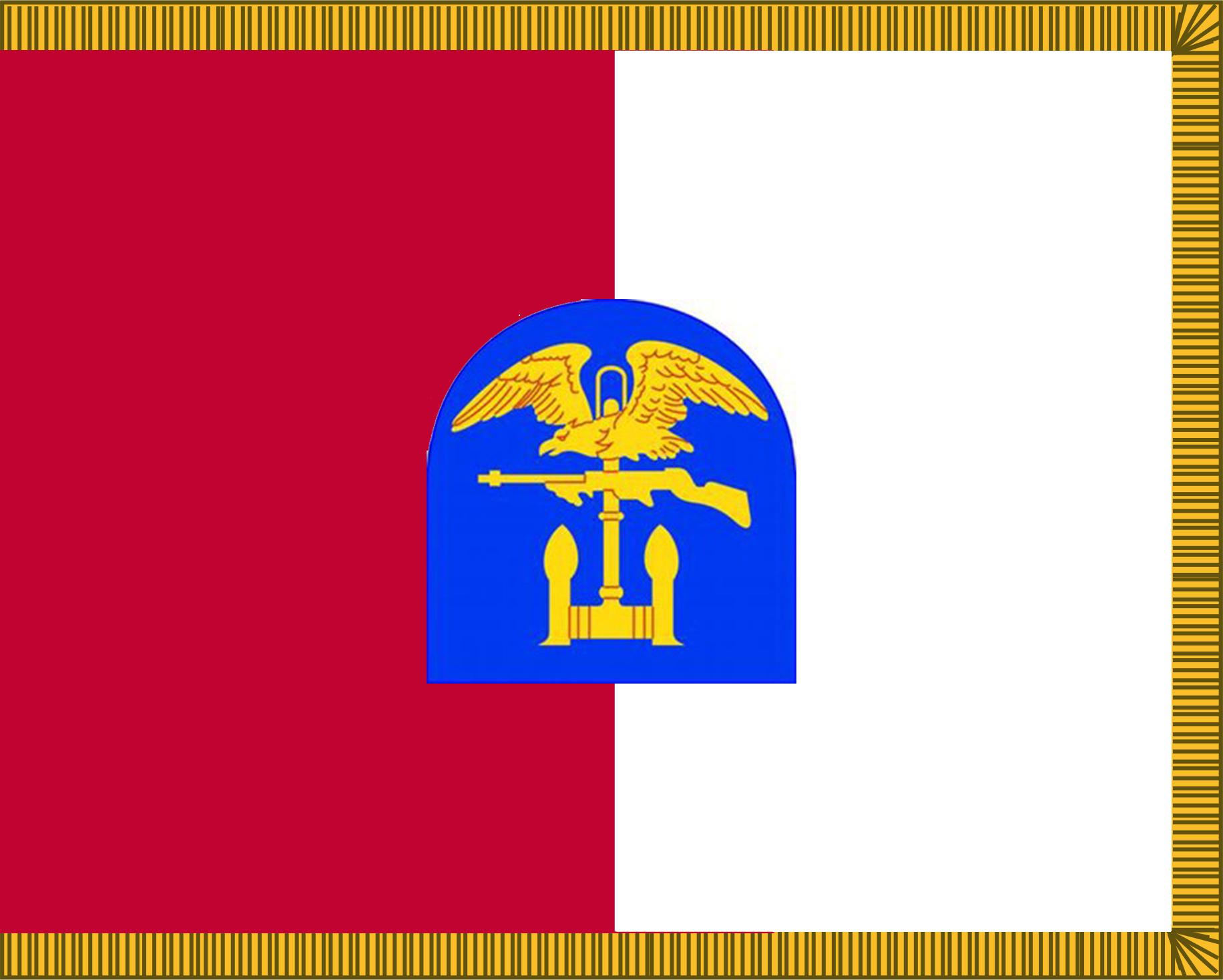
- 1st Engineer Brigade Flag

The 1st Engineer Brigade is a military engineering training brigade of the United States Army subordinate to the United States Army Engineer School. It is headquartered at Fort Leonard Wood, Missouri.

== History ==
=== World War II ===
The 1st Engineer Amphibian Brigade was activated at Camp Edwards, Massachusetts on 15 June 1942. Some 2,269 men were transferred from existing units, the 37th Engineer Combat Regiment providing the nucleus of the boat regiment, and the 87th Engineer Heavy Ponton Battalion that of the shore regiment. Brigadier General Henry C. Wolfe was assigned as commanding general on 7 July 1942. The brigade trained until 15 July, when it was assigned to the Amphibious Training Command.

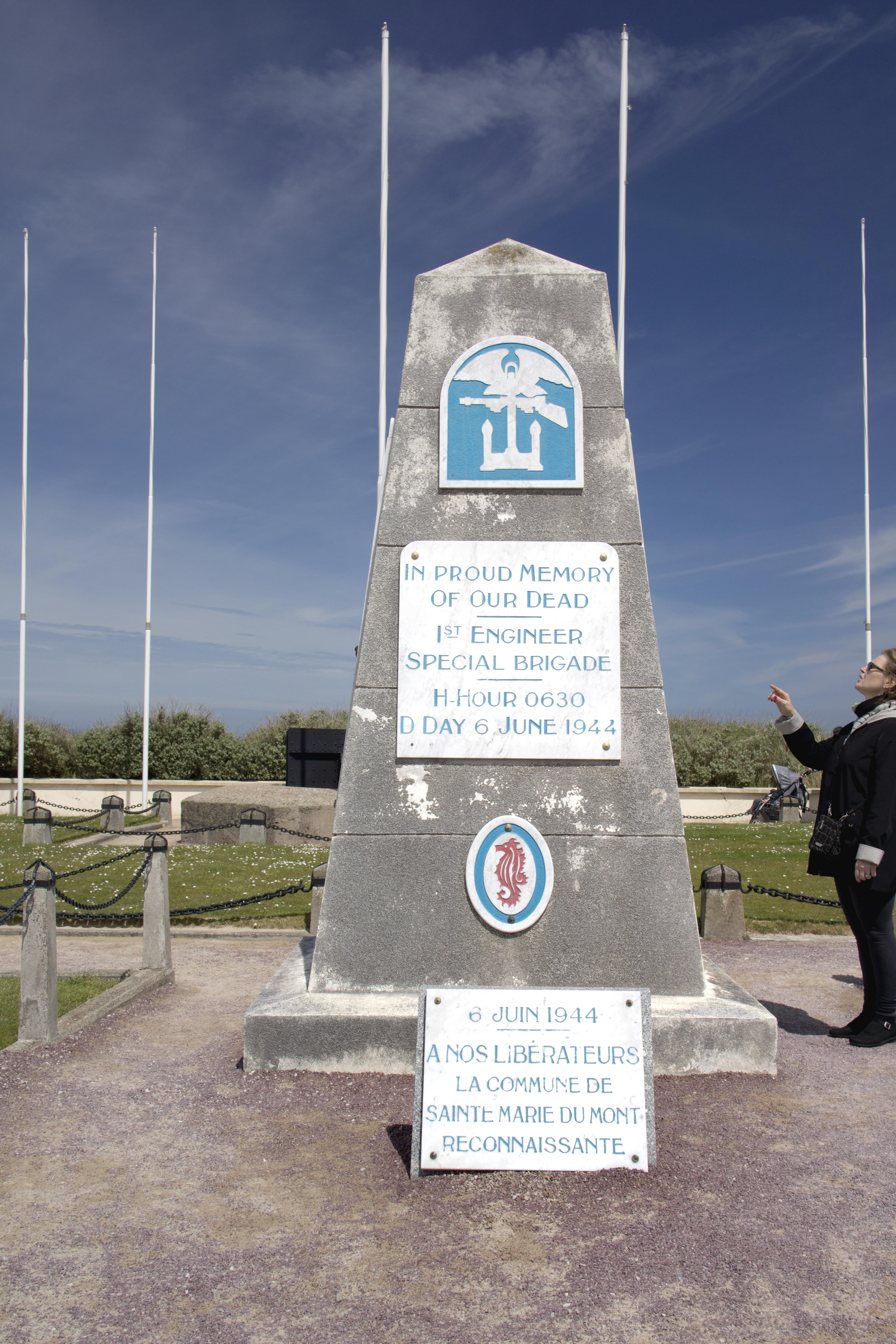
Monument for the 1st Engineer Special Brigade on Utah Beach

The brigade was pulled from the Amphibious Training Center early and sent to England to participate in Operation Sledgehammer, departing from the New York Port of Embarkation on 5 August, and arriving on 17 August. Elements of the brigade participated in the Operation Torch. The 531st Shore Regiment and 286th Signal Company acted as the shore party for the 1st Infantry Division, while the 2nd Battalion, 591st Engineer Boat Regiment was reorganized as a shore battalion, and operated in support of Combat Command B, 1st Armored Division. Brigade headquarters departed Glasgow on 24 November, and landed in North Africa on 6 December. Wolfe became chief engineer at the Services of Supply on 22 February and Colonel R. L. Brown of the 531st Engineer Shore Regiment acted as commander.

Wolfe rejoined the brigade on 22 March 1943, but on 25 May he became S-3 at Allied Force Headquarters, and was replaced by Colonel Eugene M. Caffey. On 10 May 1943, the brigade was redesignated the 1st Engineer Special Brigade. The 591st Boat Regiment was detached, as was the 561st Boat Maintenance Company, which remained in England working on Navy landing craft, but the 36th and 540th Engineer Combat Regiments were attached for the 10 July Allied invasion of Sicily (Operation Husky), bringing the strength of the brigade to over 20,000. The brigade then participated in the Allied invasion of Italy at Salerno (Operation Avalanche) on 9 September.

In November 1943, the headquarters of the 1st Engineer Special Brigade, along with the 531st Shore Regiment, 201st Medical Battalion, 286th Signal Company, 262nd Amphibian Truck Battalion and 3497th Ordnance Medium Automotive Maintenance Company, returned to England to participate in the invasion of Normandy (Operation Overlord). This nucleus of 3,346 men was built up to a strength of 15,000 men for Overlord. During Exercise Tiger, a rehearsal for the Normandy operation on 28 April, German E-Boats attacked a convoy of landing ships, tank (LSTs) of the XI Amphibious Force carrying troops of the brigade. Two LSTs were sunk, and the brigade lost 413 men dead and 16 wounded. The exercise was observed by Lieutenant General Omar N. Bradley, who, unaware of the sinking of the LSTs, blamed the resulting poor performance of the brigade on Caffey, and had him temporarily replaced for the Normandy landings by Brigadier General James E. Wharton.

The brigade participated in the D-Day landing on Utah Beach, and operated as Utah Beach Command until 23 October 1944, and then as the Utah District of the Normandy Base Section until 7 December 1944. Under the command of Colonel Benjamin B. Talley, the brigade headquarters returned to England, and embarked for the United States on 23 December. It arrived at Fort Dix, New Jersey, on 30 December. After four weeks leave, it reassembled at Fort Lewis, Washington. Part of the brigade headquarters went by air to Leyte to join the XXIV Corps for the invasion of Okinawa, while the rest traveled directly to Okinawa on the USS Achernar. The brigade was in charge of unloading on Okinawa from 9 April to 31 May. It then prepared for the invasion of Japan. This did not occur due to the end of the war, and the brigade landed in Korea on 12 September 1945. Its final commander was Colonel Robert J. Kasper, who assumed command on 1 November 1945. The brigade was inactivated in Korea on 18 February 1946.

Organization for the landing in Normandy:

- Brigade Headquarters
- 531st Engineer Shore Regiment
- 24th Amphibian Truck Battalion
  - 462nd Amphibian Truck Company
  - 478th Amphibian Truck Company
  - 479th Amphibian Truck Company
- 306th Quartermaster Battalion
  - 556th Quartermaster Railhead Company
  - 562nd Quartermaster Railhead Company
  - 3939th Quartermaster Gas Supply Co
- 191st Ordnance Battalion
  - 3497th Ordnance Medium Automotive Maintenance Company
  - 625th Ordnance Ammunition Company
- 161st Ordnance Platoon
- 577th Quartermaster Battalion
  - 363rd Quartermaster Service Company
  - 3207th Quartermaster Service Company
  - 4144th Quartermaster Service Company
- 261st Medical Battalion (Amphibious)
- 449th Military Police Company
- 286th Joint Assault Signal Company
- 33rd Chemical Decontamination Company

=== Postwar ===
On 30 September 1986, the brigade was reformed at Fort Leonard Wood, Missouri, as the 1st Engineer Brigade, and was assigned to the United States Army Engineer School within the Training and Doctrine Command.

== Current Structure ==
- 1st Engineer Brigade, Fort Leonard Wood, Missouri
  - 31st Engineer Battalion, Fort Leonard Wood, Missouri
  - 35th Engineer Battalion, Fort Leonard Wood, Missouri
  - 169th Engineer Battalion, Fort Leonard Wood, Missouri
  - 554th Engineer Battalion, Fort Leonard Wood, Missouri
