= Rome plow =

Armored bulldozer used in the Vietnam War

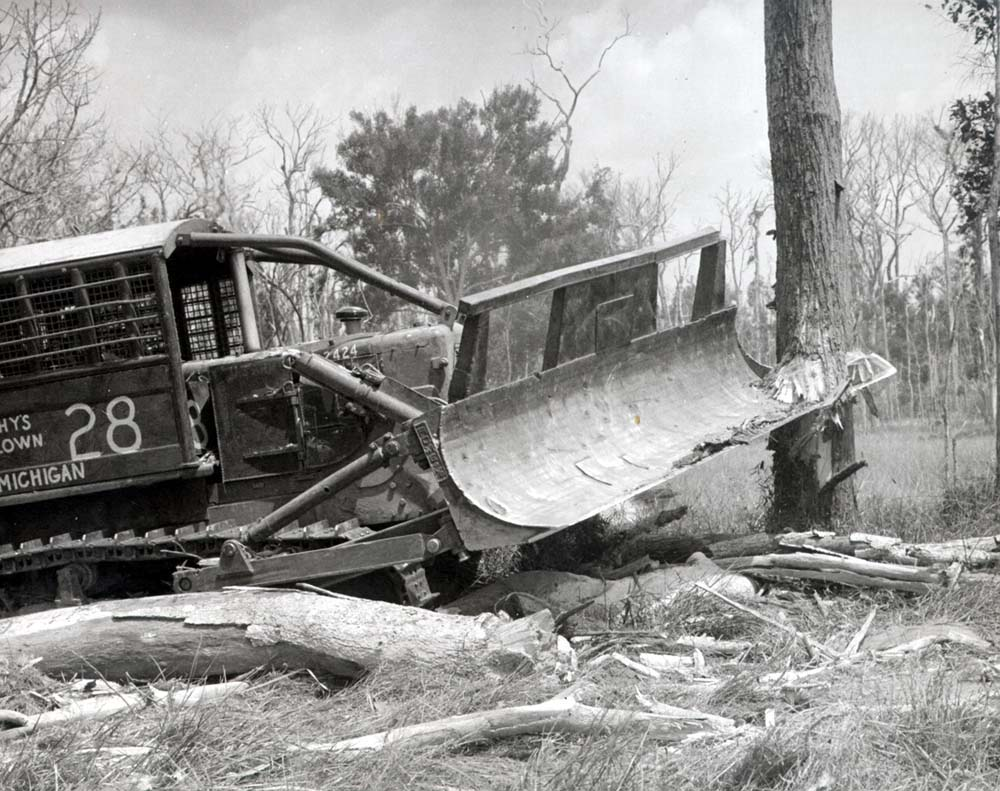
A Rome plow in action in April 1970

A Rome plow is a type of large, specially modified armored bulldozer that was used in South Vietnam by the United States military during the Vietnam War.

== Deployment ==
Rome plows were first used in the III Corps, initially by USAECV to destroy trees and other jungle flora that could be used by enemy forces. Major land clearance operations did not commence until May 1967 with the arrival of the 169th Engineer Battalion.

The plows were assigned a tank platoon and an infantry company for security. These would, prior to plowing operations, send preparatory machine guns, mortar, and 90mm tank guns into the forests and jungles; subsequent fire was continuously directed into uncleared areas to deter ambushes while the Rome plows performed their task. A search team, consisting of an infantry platoon and a squad of engineers, was also on hand to destroy any enemy installations, such as camps and tunnels, that were encountered, as well as to gather information.

During the American incursion into Cambodia on 1 May 1970, Rome plows cleared over 1,700 acres (6.9 km^{2}) of jungle near the Fishhook region, and destroyed over 1,100 enemy positions.

== See also ==
- IDF Caterpillar D9
- Killdozer

== Sources ==
- Falk, Richard A. (1976). "Environmental Warfare and Ecocide". In Richard A. Falk, ed., The Vietnam War and International Law, Volume 4: The Concluding Phase, pp. 287–304. American Society of International Law. Princeton, NJ: Princeton University Press. ISBN 0-691-09230-3.
- Starry, Donn A. (2002) [1978]. Mounted Combat in Vietnam (PDF). Vietnam Studies. Washington, DC: Department of the Army. Archived from the original (PDF) on 8 January 2015.
