= 169th Engineer Battalion =

- Coat of arms
- Active: 1943–46; 1947–72; 1986 – present
- Country: United States
- Branch: Army
- Type: Engineer
- Nickname: "Hammer"
- Mottos: "Mind and Hand"
- Engagements: World War II: Rome-Arno North Apennines Po Valley Vietnam
- Decorations: Republic of Vietnam Civil Action Honor Medal, First Class; Meritorious Unit Commendation (3)
- Website: Official 169th Engineer Battalion website

Commanders
- Current commander: LTC Kevin Lawhon, 2024

Insignia
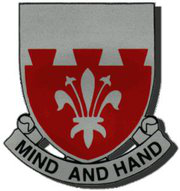
- DUI

The battalion is currently part of the U.S. Army Engineer School, headquartered at Fort Leonard Wood, Missouri and is a subordinate unit to the 1st Engineer Brigade. The battalion mainly conducts advanced individual training for engineering vertical skills and specialty engineering skills.

== Subordinate units ==
- A Company 169th Engineer Battalion (12D Diver) Panama City, FL
- B Company 169th Engineer Battalion (12D Diver Phase I, 12R Interior Electrician, 12T Technical Engineer, 12Y Geospatial Engineer, 12Q/12PU4 Powerline Distribution Specialist) Fort Leonard Wood, MO
- C Company 169th Engineer Battalion (12W Carpenter/Mason) Gulfport, MS
- D Company 169th Engineer Battalion (12K Plumber) Sheppard AFB, TX
- FF Detachment (12M Firefighter) Goodfellow AFB, TX
- Sapper Leader Course (ASI S4 Sapper Leader) Fort Leonard Wood, MO

== History and lineage ==
Shortly after the battalion was formed in 1943 at Camp Beale, California, it first saw combat during the Allied Invasion of Italy in September 1944. The battalion fought its way up the Italian Peninsula. After the capture of Rome, the 169th played a significant role in the seven-month campaign to push the Nazi Army through the Apennines and out of the Po Valley of Northern Italy. Throughout their campaign in Italy, the soldiers of the 169th cleared minefields and tank obstacles, destroyed enemy bunkers, cleared roadways, built many bridges to replace those destroyed by the retreating enemy, removed barbwire obstacles, built enemy prisoner of war compounds, and fought as Infantry when the need arose. The battalion received the Rome, North Apennines, and the Po Valley campaign streamers as a result of their courageous service in Italy during World War II.

Beginning in 1954, the battalion spent twelve years at Fort Stewart, Georgia before their next major period of active service in Vietnam. At Fort Stewart, the battalion’s mission was to construct, rehabilitate and maintain military routes of communications and facilities, and perform related engineering work in the communications zone and rear areas of the combat zone. Starting in 1966, the 169th served seven years in a war that had no front lines and where the farmer working in the field by day became an enemy attacking by night. This battalion built hundreds of miles of roads and constructed quarters for thousands of American soldiers throughout the Delta region of South Vietnam. They also built bridges, installed culverts, repaired heavy construction equipment, cleared land, and accomplished all the missions associated with heavy engineer construction equipment operators, mechanics, carpenters, plumbers, electricians, structures specialists, and combat engineers. The battalion was reactivated in 1986 and served as Advanced Individual Training unit responsible for the training of various vertical construction specialties. Later that year, the battalion became the 169th Engineer Battalion (Support). In this role, the 169th supported all types of engineer training on Fort Leonard Wood by commanding the staff and faculty company, garrison company, and engineer companies whose mission involved pipelines, quarries, fire fighting, and bridging. In the spring of 1995, the 169th became a One Station Unit Training battalion responsible for training combat engineers, bridge builders, heavy construction equipment operators and mechanics, and engineer technicians for service in today’s Army. The 169th has a credit for 14 campaigns in Southeast Asia and three in World War II. It has also received three meritorious unit commendations and one Vietnam Civil Action Honor Medal.

- Commander/ Assumption Year
- LTC LaMarre, Jean Belair 1955
- LTC Buszalski, Ernest A. 1959
- LTC Rhett, John T. 1962
- LTC Kincy, Willian Jr. 1963
- LTC Day, Franklin R. 1964
- LTC Rees, Marvin W. 1966
- LTC Wray, Willaim R. 1967
- LTC Prentiss, Louis 1968
- LTC Eineigal, Raymond J. 1968
- LTC Flanigan, Clifford 1969
- LTC Anrold, Edward 1969
- LTC McGarry, Robert 1969
- LTC Andre, Nick J. 1970
- LTC Sanders, Connelly 1970
- LTC Smith, Terry 1970
- LTC Baldwin, Jesse 1971

Inactivated 30 Apr 72 Lineage continued as 3rd Bn, 4th Tng Bde, FLW, MO

- LTC McNulty, James W. 1975
- LTC Sigler, James H. 1975
- LTC Kubo, Arthur S. 1976
- LTC Franklin, Forrest E. 1978
- LTC Hickman, Carlos W. 1979
- LTC McKee, Anthony J. 1981
- LTC Jenkins, James E. 1983

Reactivated as 169th EN BN (Support), FLW, MO Sept 86

- LTC Mitchell, William H. Jr. 1986
- LTC Woodbury, George A. 1987
- LTC Wank, James 1989
- LTC Moakler, Martin 1991
- LTC Strom, Robert 1993
- LTC Carr, Dale 1995
- LTC Estes, Allen 1997
- LTC Ockrassa, Brigid 1999
- LTC Drolet, John D. 2000
- LTC Mallery, Jay 2002
- LTC Holbrook, David 2004
- LTC Larsen 2006
- LTC Kramer 2008
- LTC Howell 2010
- LTC Schlosser, Teresa 2012
- LTC Preston, Scott 2014
- LTC Bohrer, Aaron 2016
- LTC Pabis, Justin 2018
- LTC Bowman, Vanessa 2020
- LTC Wheeler, Jeremy 2022
- LTC Lawhon, Kevin 2024

CSM/ Assumption Year

- CSM Moore, Donald G. 1986–1988
- CSM Morgan, Raymond W. 1988–1990
- CSM Poe, Alvis C. 1990–1992
- CSM Moske, Michael P 1992–1996
- CSM Delgado, David 1996–1998
- CSM Monroe, Bonza 1998–2001
- CSM Adams, Thomas 2001–2002
- CSM Underberg, Richard J. 2002–2004
- CSM Lea, Linda 2004–2006
- MSG Williams 2006–2007
- CSM Vigil, Maria 2007–2010
- CSM Kelch 2010–2012
- CSM Walker, Trever 2012–2014
- CSM Love Anthony 2014–2016
- CSM Danjoint, Moise 2016–2018
- CSM Meade, Kevin 2018–2020
- CSM Christesen, Tommy 2020-2022
- CSM Burgosrodiguez, Alex 2022-2024
- CSM Cloutier, Bradley 2024-

== Distinctive unit insignia ==
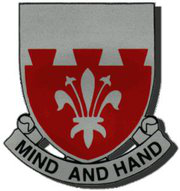

Description: A silver color metal and enamel device 1 1/8 inches (2.86 cm) in height overall consisting of a shield blazoned: Per fess enhanced dovetailed of three Argent and Gules, in base a fleur-de-lis flowered of the first. Attached below the shield is a silver scroll inscribed "MIND AND HAND" in black letters.

Symbolism: Scarlet and white are the colors of the Corps of Engineers. The fleur-de-lis flowered was suggested by the coat of arms of Florence, Italy, where the battalion was activated after being reconstituted in 1944. The dovetail is used to allude to an engineering construction principle. The three points represent the organization's three battle honors awarded for service in Italy during World War II.

Background: The distinctive unit insignia was approved on 26 Jan 1956.

== Coat of arms ==

Shield: Scarlet and white are the colors of the Corps of Engineers. The fleur-de-lis flowered was suggested by the coat of arms of Florence, Italy, where the battalion was activated after being reconstituted in 1944. The dovetail is used to allude to an engineering construction principle. The three points represent the organization's three battle honors awarded for service in Italy during World War II.

Crest: The many campaigns in which the 169th participated, during the Vietnam War are recalled by the golden dragon, holding an engineer's divider to symbolize the outstanding construction work the unit accomplished in support of military operations during 1967 and 1968. The mountains represent the rugged country in which exacting land development projects were completed and also symbolize the regions in Italy where the unit saw action during World War II, specifically the Po Valley, North Apennines and Rome-Arno. Scarlet denotes courage and recalls three Meritorious Unit Commendations and the Republic of Vietnam Civil Action Honor Medal awarded the 169th in the period 1966 to 1970.

== Honors ==
169th Engineer Battalion's Lineage and Honors Certificate

Campaign Participation Credit
World War II
Rome-Arno
North Apennines
Po Valley

Vietnam
Counteroffensive
Counteroffensive, Phase II
Counteroffensive, Phase III
Tet Counteroffensive
Counteroffensive, Phase IV
Counteroffensive, Phase V
Counteroffensive, Phase VI
Tet 69/Counteroffensive
Summer–Fall 1969
Winter–Spring 1970
Sanctuary Counteroffensive
Counteroffensive, Phase VII
Consolidation I
Consolidation II
Cease–Fire

Decorations
Meritorious Unit Commendation (Army), Streamer embroidered VIETNAM 1966–1967
Meritorious Unit Commendation (Army), Streamer embroidered VIETNAM 1967
Meritorious Unit Commendation (Army), Streamer embroidered 1967–1968
Republic of Vietnam Civil Action Honor Medal, First Class, Streamer embroidered VIETNAM 1967–1970
