= 20th Engineer Brigade =

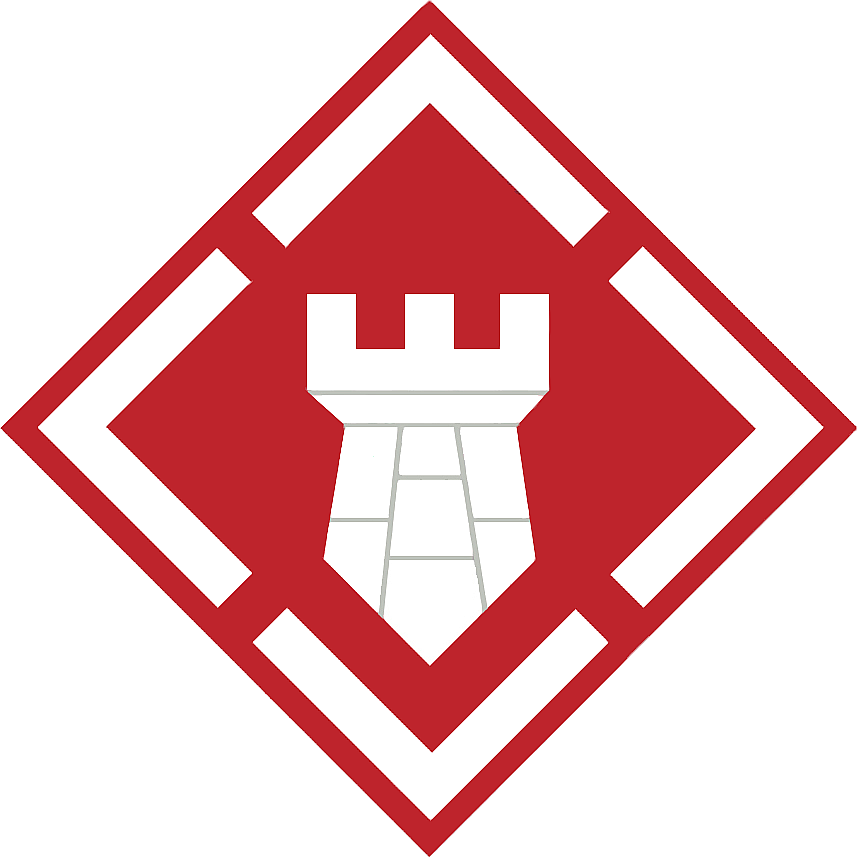
- Shoulder sleeve insignia of the 20th Engineer Brigade
- Active: 16 August 1950 – 12 December 1958; 1 May 1967 – 20 September 1971; 21 June 1974–present
- Country: United States
- Branch: United States Army
- Type: Combat engineer brigade
- Role: Combat Engineers
- Size: Brigade
- Part of: XVIII Airborne Corps
- Garrison/HQ: Fort Bragg (North Carolina, US)
- Motto: Building Combat Power
- Engagements: Vietnam War; Operation Desert Storm; Operation Iraqi Freedom

Commanders
- Current commander: COL Sean Shields
- Command Sergeant Major: CSM Timothy Barr
- Notable commanders: Robert B. Flowers; Harold Parfitt

Insignia
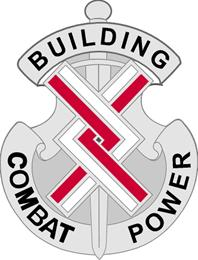
- Distinctive unit insignia

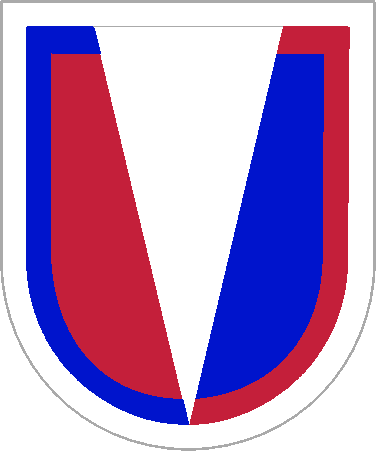
- Beret flash of the brigade

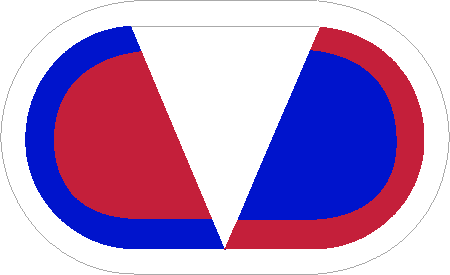
- Airborne background trimming of the brigade

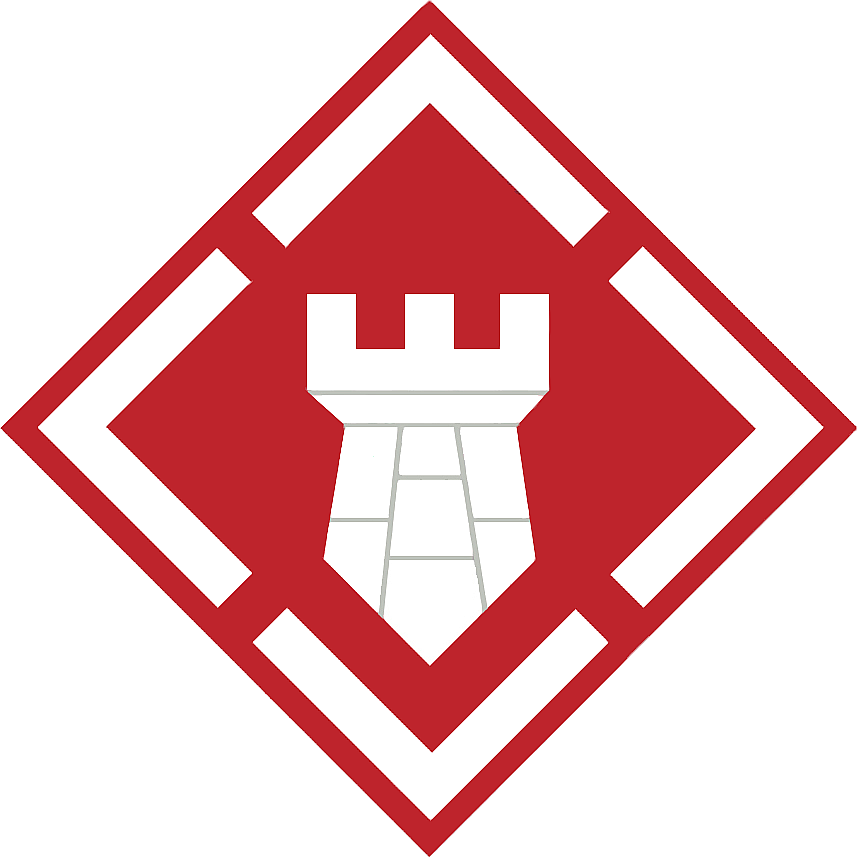
- Combat service identification badge

- Flag

The 20th Engineer Brigade is a combat engineer brigade assigned to the XVIII Airborne Corps of the United States Army stationed at Fort Bragg. Although the brigade was identified as an airborne unit, not all of its subordinate units were airborne qualified—despite the airborne tab as part of the unit patch. Soldiers of the 20th Engineer Brigade provide various supportive duties to other Army units, including construction, engineering, and mechanical work on other Army projects.

Though its predecessor units have lineage that dates back before the American Civil War, the formation was not formally designated as the 20th Engineer Brigade until its activation on 16 August 1950, at Fort Leonard Wood, Missouri. Deploying overseas in November 1952, it supported construction projects in southwestern France until its return to the US on 10 September 1954. From then until its inactivation on 12 December 1958, it provided support to XVIII Airborne Corps.

Reactivated on 1 May 1967, at Fort Bragg, the brigade deployed to South Vietnam where it supported American forces for several years and a dozen campaigns. The brigade was deactivated on 20 September 1971, as American forces withdrew from the country.

Reactivated as an airborne brigade on 21 June 1974 at Fort Bragg, NC, the unit has since seen numerous overseas tours, including to Kuwait during the Persian Gulf War, Kosovo, Afghanistan during Operation Enduring Freedom, and Iraq during Operation Iraqi Freedom and Operation New Dawn. It has also independently conducted various humanitarian missions in the United States and in other nations throughout the world.

== Organization ==
The 20th Engineer Brigade currently consists of:

- Brigade Headquarters and Headquarters Company (HHC), at Fort Bragg, North Carolina
- 27th Engineer Battalion, at Fort Bragg, North Carolina
- 46th Engineer Battalion, at Fort Polk, Louisiana

The 307th Engineer Battalion, formerly assigned to the 82nd Airborne Division, was reactivated effective 16 September 2010 by reflagging the existing 37th Engineer Battalion. In 2014 the 307th was transferred to the 3d Brigade Combat Team of the 82nd Airborne Division.

The insignia was originally authorized on 30 June 1967. It was amended on 14 January 1975 to add the blue and white "Airborne" tab. The tab is part of the unit insignia and does not indicate whether an individual soldier is Airborne-qualified. Parachute wings on an individual soldier indicate Airborne-qualification. While the brigade headquarters was on jump status, some subordinate elements were not.

On 16 September 2009, the brigade's Airborne status was terminated and the "Airborne" tab on the brigade's shoulder sleeve insignia was removed.

== History ==
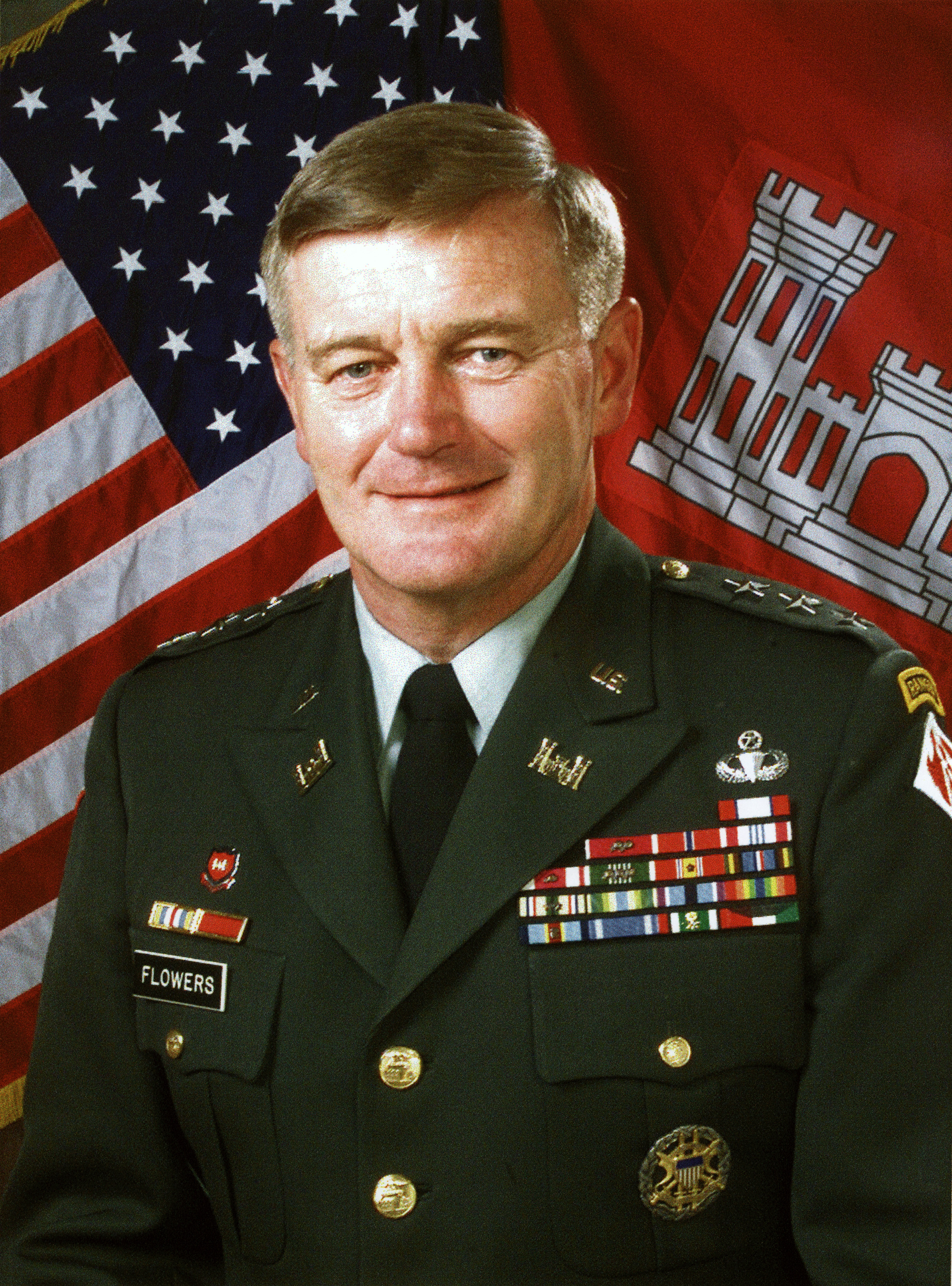
Robert B. Flowers, a former commander of the 20th Engineer Brigade, who later served as the Chief of Engineers.

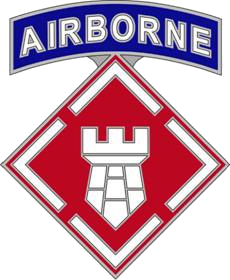
Former CSIB

=== Lineage ===
The lineage and honors of the 20th Engineer Brigade date back to the American Civil War. First designated as the Battalion of Engineers on 3 August 1861, the battalion participated in 10 campaigns during the Civil War. Since that time, unit designations have changed many times as predecessors of the 20th Engineer Brigade have served in the Spanish–American War, the Philippine–American War, the Mexican Expedition, World War I and World War II. Though it was not officially designated as the 20th Engineer Brigade during all of these wars, the Brigade received campaign participation credit for all of these campaigns, and has numerous campaign streamers for what its previous incarnations did during these conflicts.

On 16 August 1950 the brigade was first designated as the 20th Engineer Brigade and activated at Camp Leonard Wood, Missouri. It deployed overseas to France in November 1952 and established headquarters in Croix Chapeau. Comprising two battalions and six separate companies, the brigade provided engineer construction support to the Base Section of the European COMMZ in southwestern France. In August 1954, it redeployed back to the United States and was activated at Fort Bragg, North Carolina, on 10 September 1954. From that time until its inactivation on 12 December 1958, the brigade provided engineer support to the XVIII Airborne Corps.

=== Vietnam War and aftermath ===
In response to the buildup of US forces in South Vietnam, the brigade headquarters was reactivated 1 May 1967, at Fort Bragg and deployed to Vietnam in August 1967 as a subordinate to USAECV. During the Vietnam War, the brigade numbered over 13,000 officers and enlisted men organized into three engineer groups, with 14 battalions and 31 separate companies and detachments. One of these soldiers, Al Gore, would later become Vice President of the United States.

20th Engineer Brigade insignia, with "Airborne" tab.

The brigade provided all non-divisional engineer support in Military Regions III and IV during eleven campaigns. Units cleared more than one-half million acres (2,000 km^{2}) of jungle, paved 500 kilometers of highway, and constructed bridges totaling more than six miles (10 km) in length. As American forces were withdrawing from Vietnam, the brigade was inactivated 20 September 1971.

As the organization of the Army changed following Vietnam, the 20th Engineer Brigade was again reactivated at Fort Bragg, North Carolina as an airborne brigade on 21 June 1974. Assigned as a subordinate command of the XVIII Airborne Corps, which comprised one airborne combat engineer battalion, a heavy construction battalion and four separate companies. Additionally, the 283rd Engineer Detachment (Terrain Analysis) provided terrain intelligence needs of the brigade's mission. Since that time the brigade and its subordinate units supported the XVIII Airborne Corps, fulfilling critical combat engineer, construction, topographic, and bridging missions. In the wake of February 1976 Guatemalan earthquake, the brigade participated in humanitarian aid and rebuilding efforts of a major highway, CA-9.

The brigade participated in the recovery efforts following the Great Lakes Blizzard of 1977. Over 300 members of the unit were dispatched to New York State to help with recovery efforts. As requirements and the engineer force structure changed, the brigade inactivated the 548th Engineer Battalion (Combat)(Heavy) in 1987 and activated the 37th Engineer Battalion (Combat)(Airborne). In 1989, the 30th Engineer Battalion (Topographic) was added to the brigade. Over the years, the brigade has provided engineer support to XVIII Airborne Corps and other Army commands. In addition to training, it has deployed in support of operations across the entire spectrum of conflict from disaster relief to combat operations.

=== Gulf War ===
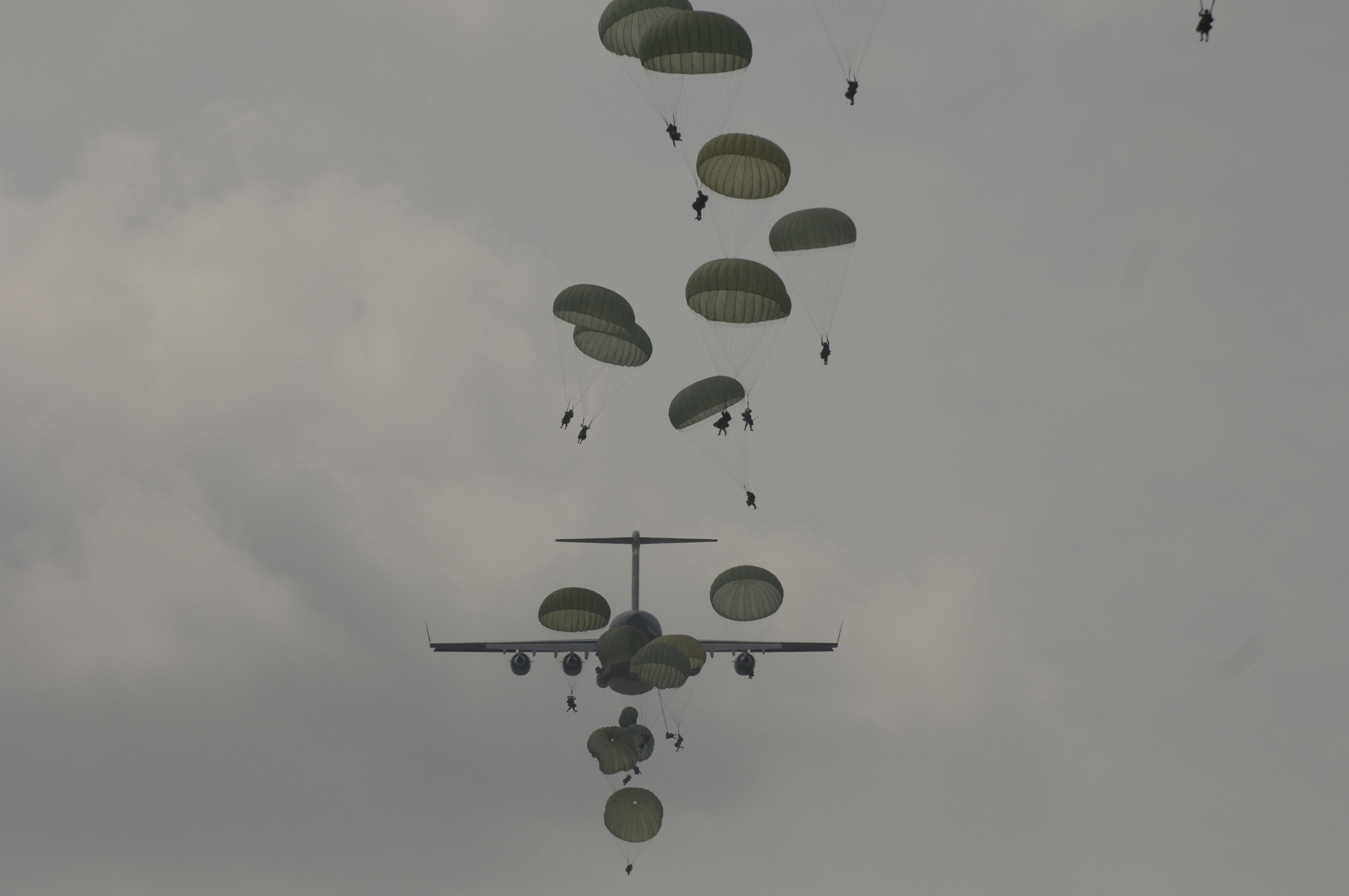
US Army soldiers from the 20th Engineer Brigade jump from a C-17 Globemaster III aircraft during a joint forcible entry exercise at Fort Bragg, N.C., 21 August 2006.

The brigade was called to support the multinational response to the Iraqi invasion of Kuwait on 2 August 1990. The brigade grew to a 7,700 soldier force composed of three groups, ten battalions, four separate companies, and eight detachments in support of XVIII Airborne Corps during Operations Desert Shield and Desert Storm. The brigade completed 1,500 combat heavy battalions equivalent days of work constructing roads, airfields, heliports, ammunition/fuel/water storage points, life support areas and forward landing strips, distributed over ten million maps, trained over 5,000 coalition engineers, and supported the French attack on Assalman airfield. During follow-on missions the brigade destroyed over 6,000 enemy bunkers and one million tons of munitions.

After the Gulf War, elements of the brigade were dispatched to Haiti on a humanitarian mission. The 20th Engineer Brigade was assigned to construct base camps, improve the Haitian infrastructure, participate in humanitarian service projects, and assist with the reestablishment of public services, with a goal of improving overall quality of life within the country.

Since 11 September 2001, it has participated in repeated operations in Kosovo, Afghanistan, and Iraq.

=== First Iraq tour ===
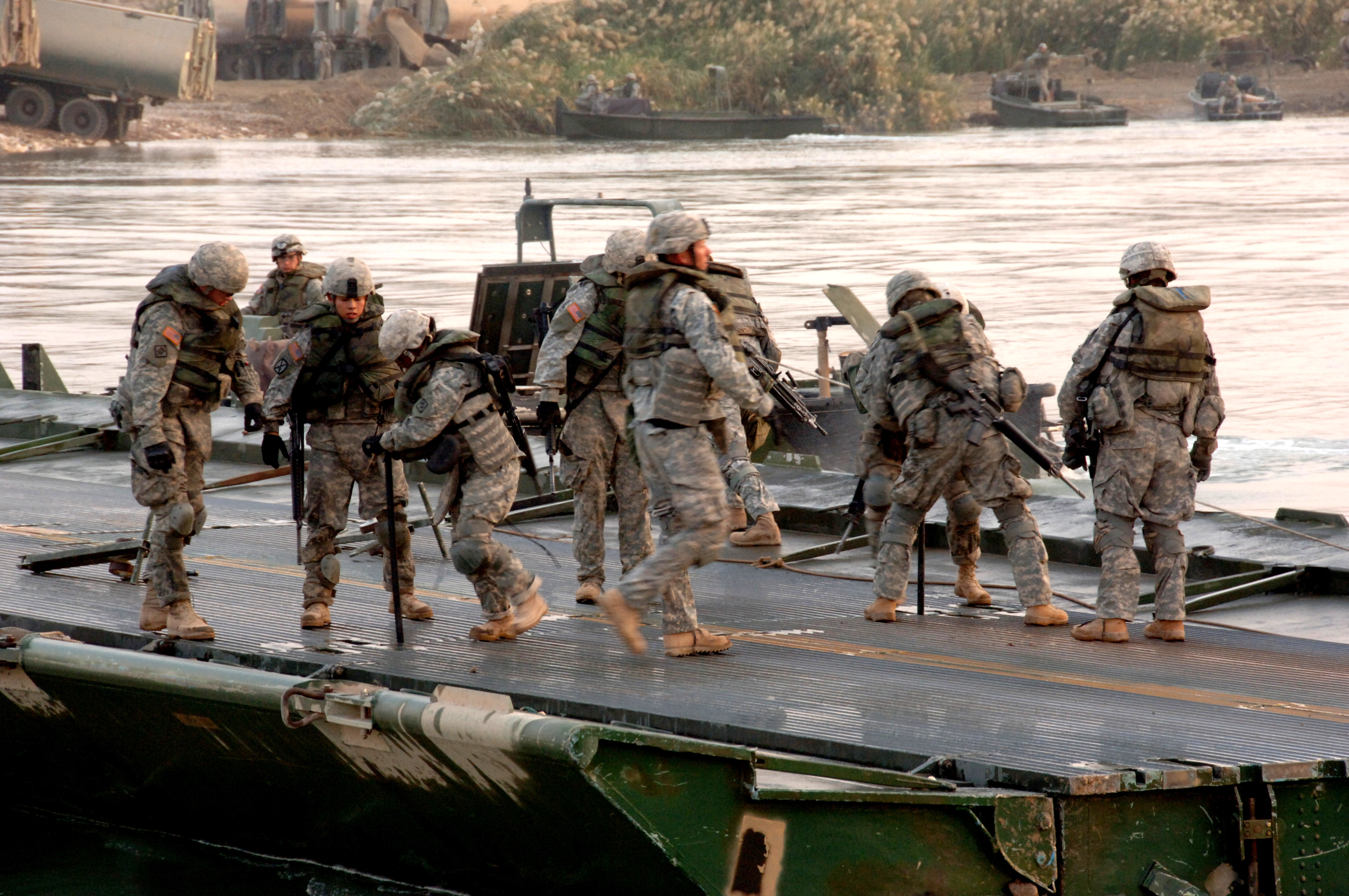
20th Engineer Brigade soldiers construct a bridge in the Euphrates River.

In November 2004 the brigade headquarters deployed to Camp Victory, Iraq in support of OIF 04-06. The brigade grew to a size of 6,100 personnel in of three brigade headquarters companies, seven battalions, six separate companies and nine detachments. The brigade served as the Multi-National Corps – Iraq corps-level engineer headquarters for all echelon-above-division engineers in Iraq, providing command and control for general support combat and construction engineer missions across the country. During its deployment, the 20th Engineer Brigade patrolled 57,950 kilometers of roads for Improvised Explosive Devices, expanded 14 bases in support of the MNC-I basing plan; emplaced or maintained 16 bridges; expanded detention capacity for 6,000 detainees; trained over 53,000 coalition soldiers on explosives hazards awareness; reduced over 11,000 caches and over 80,000 tons of explosive munitions. Other missions included repair of an airfield known as "Key West" by light equipment elements, support of the Long Range Surveillance Detachment, 313th Military Intelligence Battalion, 82nd Airborne Division based in Zakhu, located in Iraqi Kurdistan. Another task for the Brigade was to assist British engineers in a systematic mapping of the entire nation and creating an Iraqi Geospatial Reference System, to make national reconstruction easier and more organized. The 20th Brigade suffered at least one casualty during its tour in Iraq, with a soldier killed by an enemy Improvised Explosive Device on 22 August 2005 in Ad Dwar when an explosive device destroyed his vehicle. During its deployment to Iraq, the Unit assumed command of several additional battalions from the Army National Guard, forcing existing formations of the unit to cope with additional responsibilities. Seemingly elements of the 107th and 507th Engineer Battalions of the Michigan Army National Guard, the 30th Engineer Brigade (TA) of the North Carolina Army National Guard and the 194th Engineer Brigade of the Tennessee National Guard were part of the brigade.

=== Second Iraq tour ===
The brigade again deployed to Iraq for the OIF 07-09 rotation. This time, the brigade was headquartered in Balad, Iraq. The brigade was given Husky Mine Detection vehicles and Buffalo mine protected carrier vehicles for the deployment. The brigade was responsible for providing combat, geospatial and general engineering and reconstruction operations in partnership with Provincial Reconstruction Teams, Civil Service Corps, Sons of Iraq and Iraqi Army engineers, as well as training and assisting the Iraqi Army and provincial engineers in the rebuilding of the infrastructure of Iraq. As of May 2008, the brigade had constructed 10 major bridges and destroyed or captured IED cells in nine of the country's provinces. During the deployment it was visited by Lieutenant General Lloyd J. Austin III, the commanding general of Multi-National Corps Iraq. The brigade was scheduled to return to Fort Bragg in the fall of 2008, to be replaced by the 555th Engineer Brigade. This was completed during a transfer of authority ceremony on 29 September 2008. The brigade then began redeploying to Fort Bragg, completing its return by November 2008. A year later, in August 2009, the brigade held a ceremony promoting dozens of its soldiers to the rank of Sergeant.

== Honors ==
=== Unit decorations ===
Ribbon	Award	Year	Notes
	Meritorious Unit Commendation (Army)	1967–1968	for service in Vietnam
	Meritorious Unit Commendation (Army)	1968	for service in Vietnam
	Meritorious Unit Commendation (Army)	1968–1970	for service in Vietnam
	Meritorious Unit Commendation (Army)	1970–1971	for service in Vietnam
	Meritorious Unit Commendation (Army)	1990–1991	for service in Southwest Asia
	Meritorious Unit Commendation (Army)	2004–2005	for service in Iraq
	Meritorious Unit Commendation (Army)	2007–2008	for service in Iraq
	Republic of Vietnam Civil Action Honor Medal, First Class	1967–1970	for service in Vietnam

=== Campaign streamers ===
Conflict	Streamer	Year(s)
Civil War	Peninsula	1861
Civil War	Antietam	1862
Civil War	Fredericksburg	1862
Civil War	Chancellorsville	1863
Civil War	Wilderness	1864
Civil War	Spotsylvania	1864
Civil War	Cold Harbor	1864
Civil War	Petersburg	1865
Civil War	Appomattox	1865
Civil War	Virginia 1863	1865
Spanish–American War	Santiago	1898
Philippine–American War	Tarlac	1899
Philippine–American War	Mindanao	1899
Mexican Expedition	Mexico 1916–1917	1917
World War I	Lorraine	1918
World War II	Normandy	1944
World War II	Northern France	1944
World War II	Rhineland	1944–1945
World War II	Ardennes-Alsace	1944–1945
World War II	Central Europe	1945
Vietnam War	Counteroffensive, Phase III	1967–1968
Vietnam War	Tet Counteroffensive	1968
Vietnam War	Counteroffensive, Phase IV	1968
Vietnam War	Counteroffensive, Phase V	1968
Vietnam War	Counteroffensive, Phase VI	1968–1969
Vietnam War	Tet 69/Counteroffensive	1969
Vietnam War	Summer-Fall 1969	1969
Vietnam War	Winter-Spring 1970	1970
Vietnam War	Sanctuary Counteroffensive	1970
Vietnam War	Counteroffensive, Phase VII	1970–1971
Vietnam War	Consolidation I	1970
Gulf War	Defense of Saudi Arabia	1991
Gulf War	Liberation and Defense of Kuwait	1991
Operation Iraqi Freedom	Iraqi Governance	2004–2005
Operation Iraqi Freedom	Iraqi Surge	2007–2008
Operation Iraqi Freedom	New Dawn	2011

== Notable soldiers ==
Numerous soldiers who have served in the 20th Engineer Brigade have later achieved fame for various reasons, most of them having served the 20th in Vietnam. Former 20th Engineer Brigade soldiers and engineers include Chief of Engineers Robert B. Flowers, Governor of the Panama Canal Zone Harold Parfitt, Vice President of the United States and Nobel Peace Prize winner Al Gore, Sergeant Major of the Army Leon L. Van Autreve, and West Virginian state Senator Richard Ojeda. Mike O'Hara (reporter) sportswriter for The Detroit News from 1967 to 2008. He is also in the Michigan Sports Hall of Fame. He served with the unit 1969–1971.
