= Governor Rogers =

Governor Rogers may refer to:

- Clifford Joy Rogers (1897–1962), 22nd Governor of Wyoming
- Daniel Rogers (politician) (1754–1806), 12th Governor of Delaware
- John Rankin Rogers (1838–1901), 3rd Governor of Washington
- Richard Reid Rogers (1867–1949), 3rd Military Governor of Panama Canal Zone
- Woodes Rogers (1679–1732), Royal Governor of the Bahamas from 1718 to 1721
