= David Stuart Parker =

Governor of the Panama Canal Zone (1919–1990)

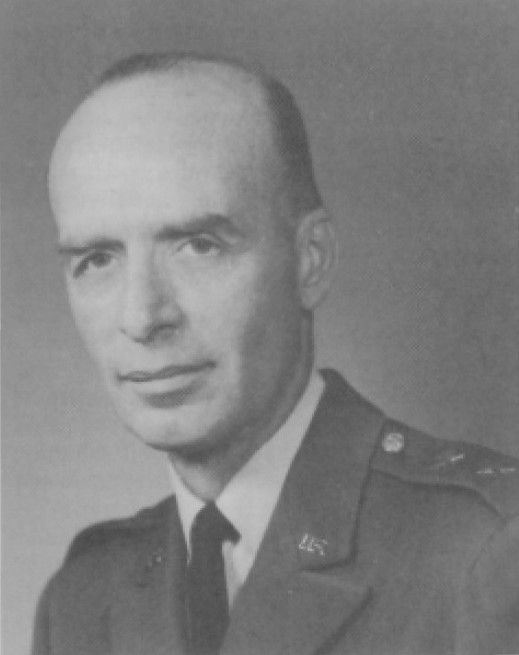

16th Governor of the Panama Canal Zone
- In office 1971–1975
- Appointed by: Richard Nixon
- Preceded by: Robert John Fleming
- Succeeded by: Harold Robert Parfitt

Personal details
- Born: March 22, 1919 Fort Huachuca, Arizona, U.S.
- Died: May 9, 1990 (aged 71) Marin General Hospital; Greenbrae, California, U.S.
- Education: United States Military Academy (BS); University of California, Berkeley (MS)

Military service
- Allegiance: United States
- Branch/service: United States Army
- Years of service: 1940–1975
- Rank: Major General
- Commands: U.S. Army Engineer Command, Vietnam; 36th Engineer Combat Group; 1299th Engineer Combat Battalion
- Battles/wars: World War II; Vietnam War
- Awards: Distinguished Service Medal (2); Legion of Merit; Air Medal (2)

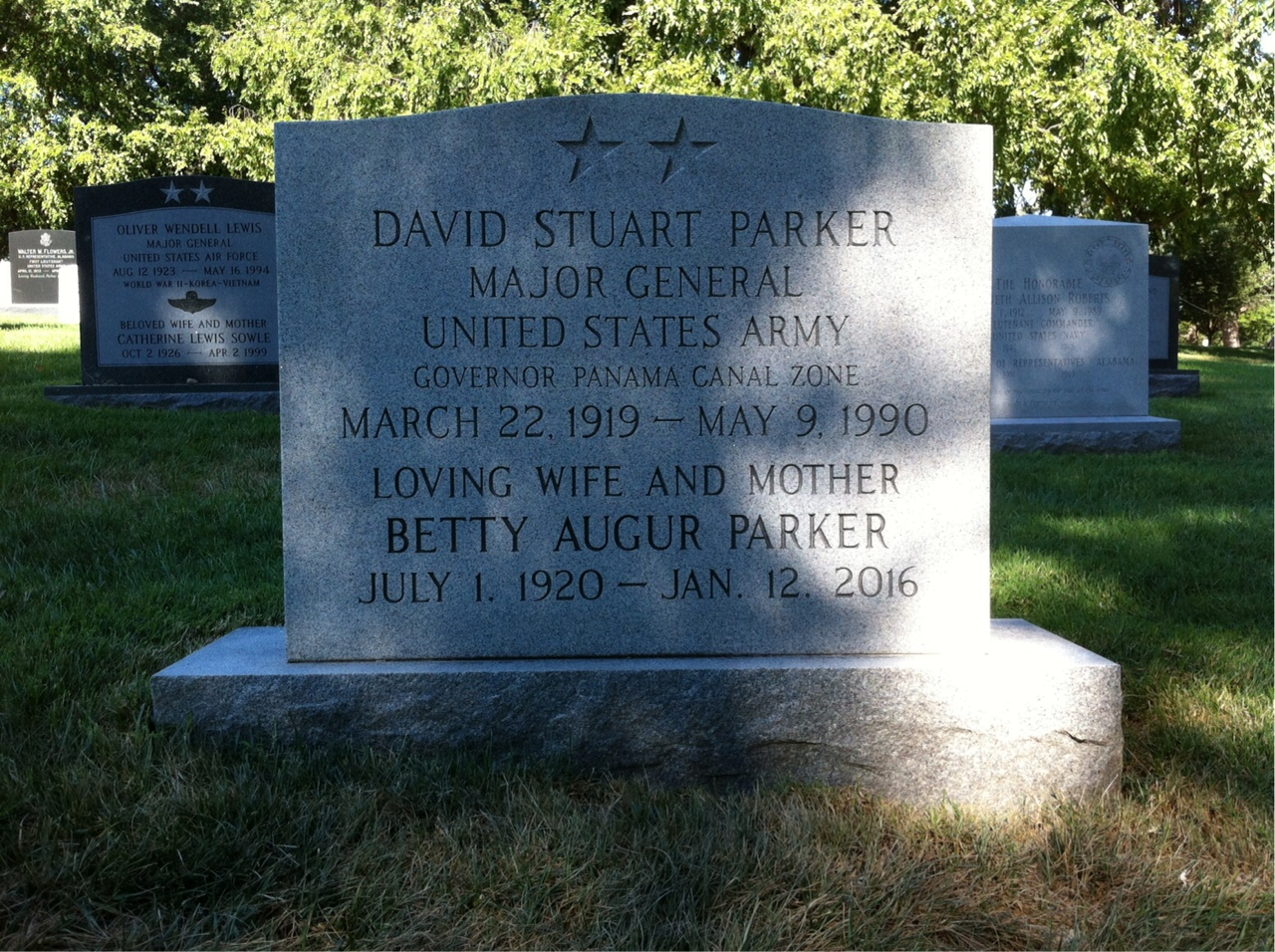
Grave at Arlington National Cemetery

David Stuart Parker (March 22, 1919 – May 9, 1990) was an American military officer who served as the governor of the Panama Canal Zone from 1971 to 1975.

== Biography ==
He was born on March 22, 1919, at Fort Huachuca in Arizona to an Army officer, Roscoe Parker. He had a brother, Ambassador Richard Bordeaux Parker.

Parker was appointed to the United States Military Academy at West Point from Washington state and graduated with a B.S. degree in June 1940. He then served with the 19th Engineer Combat Regiment at Fort Ord, California until March 1942. Parker was assigned to the Engineer School at Fort Belvoir, Virginia from March 1942 to May 1944, graduating from the Field Officers Course in 1943. He commanded the 1299th Engineer Combat Battalion at Camp Bowie, Texas from June 1944 to January 1945. Parker was promoted to lieutenant colonel in January 1945.

In World War II, he served on the staff of Admiral Chester Nimitz and on the staff of General Douglas MacArthur in Tokyo, Japan as the chief of construction. In 1948, he returned to the United States and completed an M.S. degree in civil engineering from the University of California, Berkeley in June 1949. He married Betty Augur and they had three sons, David, Bruce and Steven Parker; and a daughter, Anne Parker Diggory.

Parker taught military topography at West Point from 1949 to 1952. He then served as military assistant to the governor of the Panama Canal Zone from 1952 to 1954. Parker was promoted to colonel in July 1955. He attended the United States Army War College from 1956 to 1957. Parker commanded the 36th Combat Engineering Group in South Korea from 1960 to 1961.

Parker was Lieutenant Governor of the Panama Canal Zone from 1963 to 1965. He was promoted to brigadier general in August 1965 and major general in September 1967. Parker served a tour in Vietnam commanding engineers from 1968 to 1969. He was Governor of the Panama Canal Zone from 1971 to 1975.

Parker died of congestive heart failure on May 9, 1990, at Marin General Hospital in Greenbrae, California. He was 71 years old, and had been living in Belvedere, California. Parker was interred at Arlington National Cemetery one week later.

Preceded by Walter Philip Leber	Governor of Panama Canal Zone; 1971–1975	Succeeded by Harold Parfitt
