= Governor Carter =

Governor Carter may refer to:

- Charles Bonham-Carter (1876–1955), Governor of Malta
- George R. Carter (1866–1933), 2nd Territorial Governor of Hawaii
- Gilbert Thomas Carter (1848–1927), Governor for The Bahamas and Barbados and a Governor for Trinidad and Tobago
- Jimmy Carter (1924–2024), Governor of Georgia
- Robert Carter I (1663–1732), Colonial Governor of Virginia from 1726 to 1727
- William Arnold Carter (1907–1996), 13th Governor of the Panama Canal Zone
