= Reybold =

Reybold may refer to:

- Eugene Reybold (1884–1961), United States Army officer
- USS Reybold, more than one United States Navy ship
