= 1900 United States Senate election in Kentucky =

- January 16, 1900
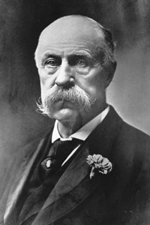

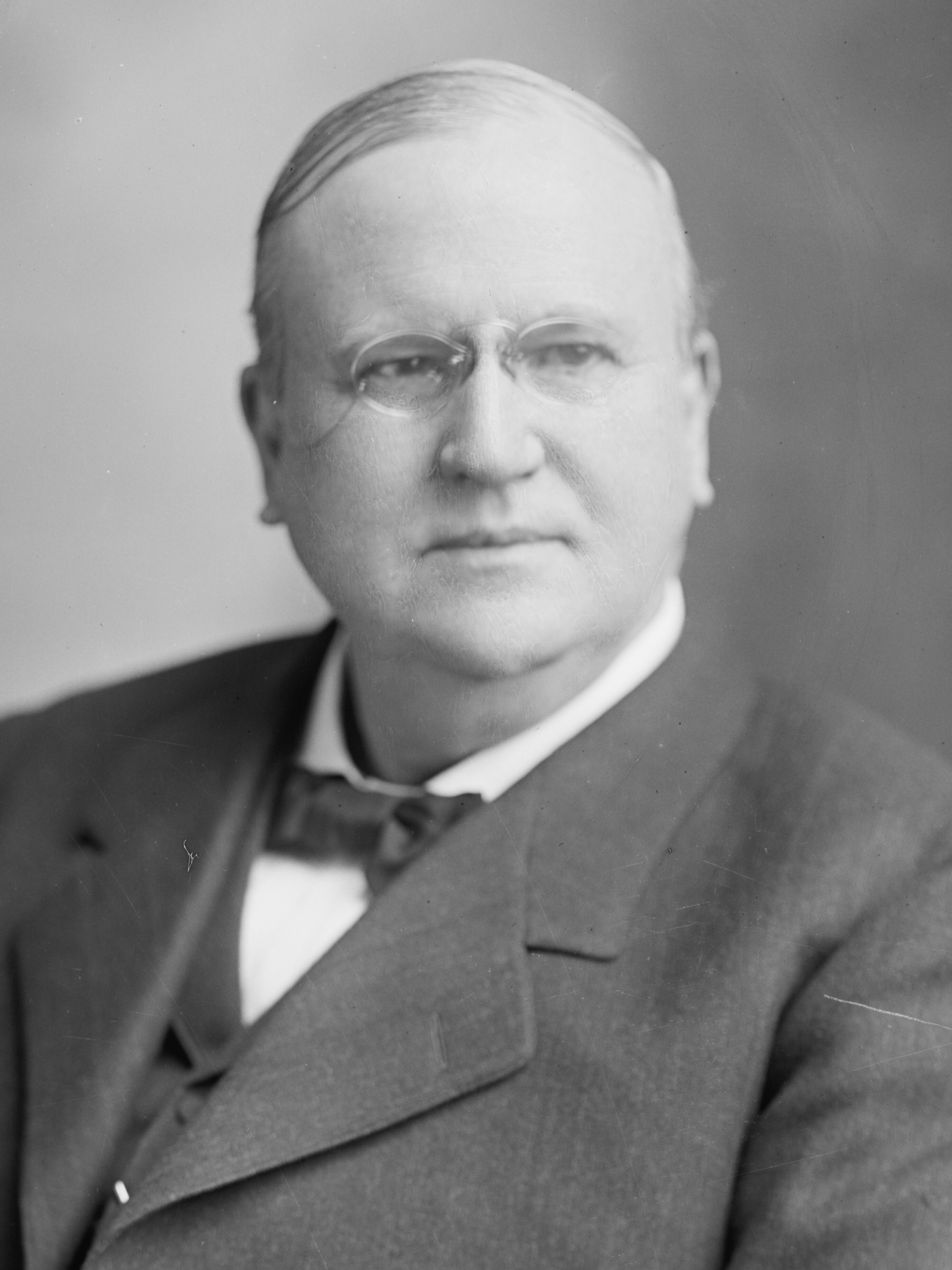
Nominee	J. C. S. Blackburn	William O. Bradley
Party	Democratic	Republican
Senate ballot	22 (64.7%)	12 (35.3%)
House ballot	55 (57.3%)	41 (42.7%)
- Blue denotes members voting for Blackburn and red denotes those voting for Bradley.
U.S. Senator before election
William Lindsay
Democratic
Elected U.S. Senator
J. C. S. Blackburn
Democratic

The 1900 United States Senate election in Kentucky was held on January 16, 1900, after an initial election on January 9, 1900. Democratic candidate and former senator J. C. S. Blackburn was elected by the Kentucky General Assembly to the United States Senate. The election was held twice due to ambiguity in the law setting the election date.

== Democratic nomination ==
The Democratic Party chose to select its candidate by legislative caucus. Former senator J. C. S. Blackburn was nominated unanimously by the caucus on January 2, 1900. He had previously been endorsed by the state Democratic convention in June 1899.

=== Candidates ===
- J. C. S. Blackburn, U.S. senator (1885–1897)

== Republican nomination ==
=== Candidates ===
- William O. Bradley, governor of Kentucky (1895–1899)

== Elections ==
=== First election ===
==== Senate ====
1900 United States Senate election in Kentucky (first Senate ballot)
Party	Candidate	Votes	%
Democratic	J. C. S. Blackburn	22	64.7
Republican	William O. Bradley	12	35.3
Total votes		34	100.0

==== House of Representatives ====
1900 United States Senate election in Kentucky (first House ballot)
Party	Candidate	Votes	%
Democratic	J. C. S. Blackburn	57	57.6
Republican	William O. Bradley	42	42.4
Total votes		99	100.0

=== Second election ===
==== Senate ====
1900 United States Senate election in Kentucky (Senate)
Party	Candidate	Votes	%
Democratic	J. C. S. Blackburn	22	64.7
Republican	William O. Bradley	12	35.3
Total votes		34	100.0
Democratic hold			

==== House of Representatives ====
1900 United States Senate election in Kentucky (House of Representatives)
Party	Candidate	Votes	%
Democratic	J. C. S. Blackburn	55	57.3
Republican	William O. Bradley	41	42.7
Total votes		96	100.0
Democratic hold			

== See also ==
- 1900–01 United States Senate elections

== Sources ==
- "Journal of the Senate of the Commonwealth of Kentucky, 1900". Journals of the Kentucky General Assembly. Frankfort, Kentucky – via HathiTrust.
