= Charles Edward Magoon =

American lawyer and diplomat (1861–1920)

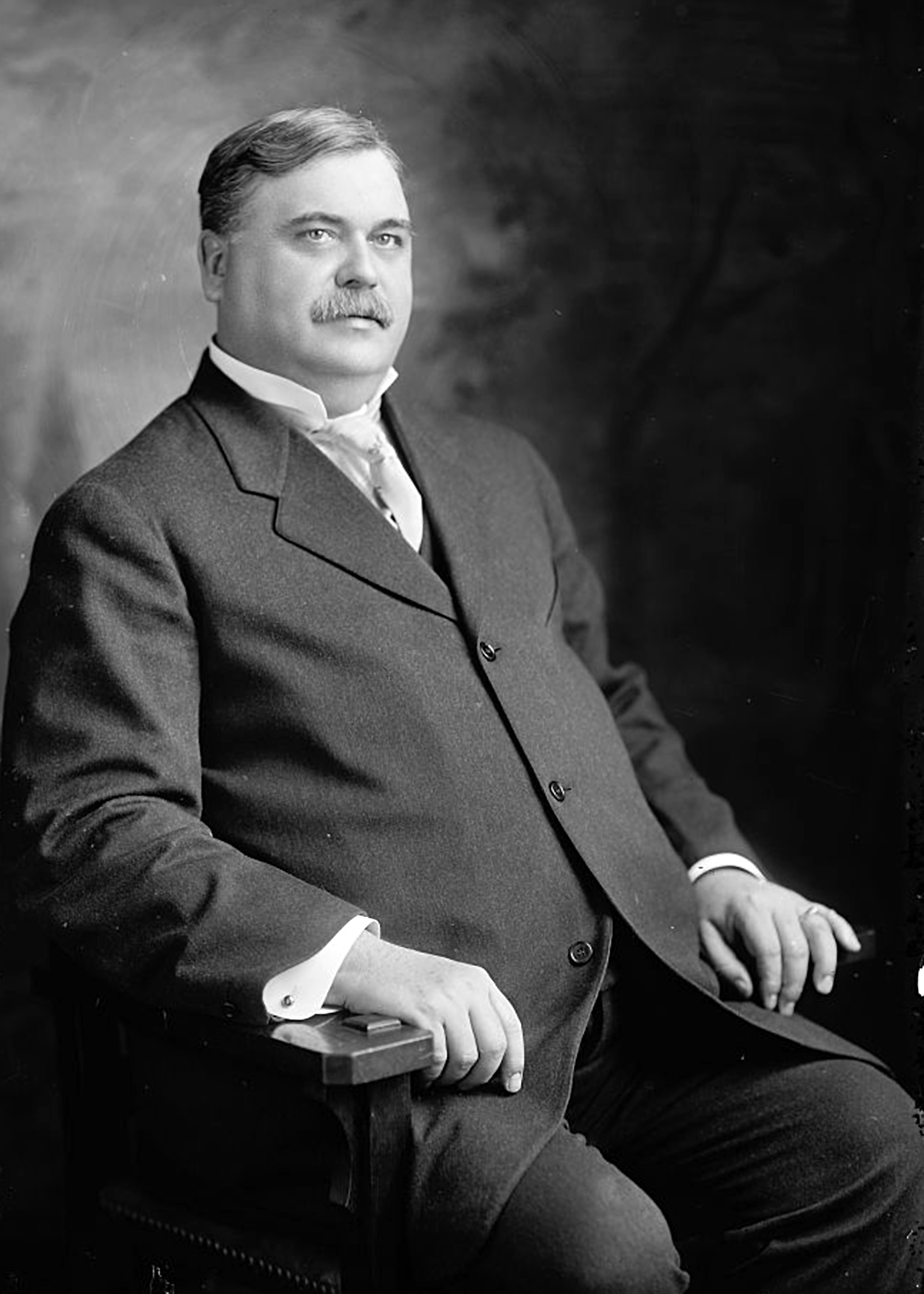
- Magoon, 1905–1920

2nd Provisional Governor of Cuba
- In office October 13, 1906 – January 28, 1909
- Appointed by: Theodore Roosevelt
- Preceded by: William Howard Taft
- Succeeded by: José Miguel Gómez (as President of Cuba)

2nd Military Governor of Panama Canal Zone
- In office 1905–1906
- Appointed by: Theodore Roosevelt
- Preceded by: George Whitefield Davis
- Succeeded by: Richard Reid Rogers (as General Counsel)

3rd United States Minister to Panama
- In office August 7, 1905 – September 25, 1906
- Appointed by: Theodore Roosevelt
- Preceded by: John Barrett
- Succeeded by: Herbert G. Squiers

Personal details
- Born: December 5, 1861 Owatonna, Minnesota, U.S.
- Died: January 14, 1920 (aged 58) Washington, D.C., U.S.
- Resting place: Wyuka Cemetery; Lincoln, Nebraska; 40.8175°N 96.6647°W
- Occupation: Lawyer

Charles Edward Magoon (December 5, 1861 – January 14, 1920) was an American lawyer, judge, diplomat, and administrator who is best remembered as a governor of the Panama Canal Zone; he also served as Minister to Panama at the same time. He was Provisional Governor of Cuba during the American occupation of Cuba from 1906 to 1909.

He was the subject of several scandals during his career. As a legal advisor working for the United States Department of War, he drafted recommendations and reports that were used by Congress and the executive branch in governing the United States' new territories following the Spanish–American War. These reports were collected as a published book in 1902, then considered the seminal work on the subject. During his time as a governor, Magoon worked to put these recommendations into practice. In summary: Magoon was hugely successful in Panama but criticized for his tenure in Cuba.

== Biography ==
=== Early life ===
Magoon was born in Owatonna, Minnesota. His family moved with him to Nebraska when he was still a small child. In 1876, he enrolled in the "prep" program at the University of Nebraska and studied there for two years before officially enrolling in 1878. He left school in 1879 to study law independently with a prominent law firm. In 1882, he was admitted to the bar and practiced law in Lincoln, Nebraska. Eventually, he was made a partner in the firm. He also became the judge advocate of the Nebraska National Guard and continued to use the title of "Judge" throughout the remainder of his career.

=== War Department and the "Magoon Incident" ===
By 1899, Magoon was sought out to join the law office of the newly created Division of Customs and Insular Affairs, later renamed the Bureau of Insular Affairs, in the U.S. Department of War under Secretary of War Russell A. Alger.

Legal and political controversies had arisen regarding whether the people of the newly acquired territories were automatically granted the same rights under the United States Constitution as American citizens. Magoon prepared a report to Alger in May 1899 that would have established the official departmental policy as "the Constitution follows the flag."

Under this view, the moment the treaty transferring the territories to U.S. sovereignty was signed, the residents of Puerto Rico, the Philippines, and other territories became subject to all the rights granted by the Constitution. For the new territories following the Spanish–American War, this would have been from the signing of the Treaty of Paris on December 10, 1898. With the resignation of Secretary Alger, this incomplete report was not released to Congress.

In August 1899, Elihu Root became the new secretary of war, and the unreleased report was scrapped. Magoon drafted a new report which came to precisely the opposite conclusion from the first: the Constitution did not apply in new territories until the United States Congress specifically passed legislation to authorize it. It argued that precedent was set when Congress passed legislation to apply the Constitution to the Northwest Territory and the Louisiana Purchase. This revised report was dated February 12, 1900, and released to Congress as a policy document expressing the Department's official stance on the issue. This view was largely adopted by the Supreme Court of the United States beginning in 1901 in the so-called "Insular Cases."

During this period, Congress was debating a Puerto Rico Tariff Act that would have been unconstitutional had the first definition been kept. This was a largely partisan issue at the time—the Republicans were in favor of this Act, but it was strongly denounced by Democrats. During the ensuing debate, the existence of the original report was discovered by the Democrats, who requested that the War Department release the earlier report to them so they could be compared "side by side". The request was refused, but a copy of the report was leaked, allowing Minority Leader James D. Richardson to read it aloud on the Senate floor, prior to the vote. These efforts failed; the vote remained along party lines and the measure was passed.

This small so-called scandal, with Magoon at the center, was termed the "Magoon Incident" by the Chicago Tribune and resulted in harsh words against him from both parties. Fellow Republicans urged that Magoon was only a "subordinate clerk", with no right to express any opinion except the opinion of the Department, and therefore the first report should carry no weight. Democrats similarly were against the second version of the report. It is unclear which version, if any, actually represented Magoon's personal views rather than the views of the current secretary of war.

After this incident, Magoon remained with the Department of War. In 1902, his work on the legal foundations of the new civil governments was released to the public as a book, Reports on The Law of Civil Government in Territory Subject to Military Occupation by the Military Forces of the United States, etc. It was reprinted several times and was considered the seminal text on the subject.

=== Panama ===
In late 1903, Secretary Root announced that he was retiring as secretary of war. Speculation followed in the media that Magoon would retire simultaneously and join the outgoing secretary in private practice. Instead, Magoon was appointed by President Theodore Roosevelt in June 1904 to be the general counsel for the Isthmian Canal Commission, the group working toward what would eventually become the Panama Canal. In this role, he would be working under Chairman John Grimes Walker, but would not be a commissioner. According to President Roosevelt, Magoon deserved the position because he had "won his spurs" working in the War Department and was well respected. Although Magoon was working for the Canal project, his office and residence remained in Washington, DC.

On March 29, 1905, President Roosevelt unexpectedly called for the simultaneous resignations of all members of the Canal Commission and the governor of the Panama Canal Zone, George Whitefield Davis. According to Secretary of War William Howard Taft, this clean sweep was due to the "inherent clumsiness" of the Commission, especially as related to sanitary problems in the Zone, as well as the difficulty of reaching consensus between the current seven commissioners. Several days later, replacement appointments were announced: Magoon was appointed both governor and a member of the Commission, with railroad entrepreneur Theodore P. Shonts made chairman of the Commission. The new Commission had seven commissioners, as required by the act of Congress that created the body, but responsibilities were to be split such that only Magoon, Shonts, and the chief engineer had any real authority. The remaining four members of the commission were appointed only to fulfil the letter of the law. Congress had already rejected a request by the President to formally make the Commission a three-member body; restructuring the organization was an end-run by the President around that restriction. In order to assume his new duties, Magoon relocated to the Canal Zone the following month.

==== Governor of Panama Canal Zone ====
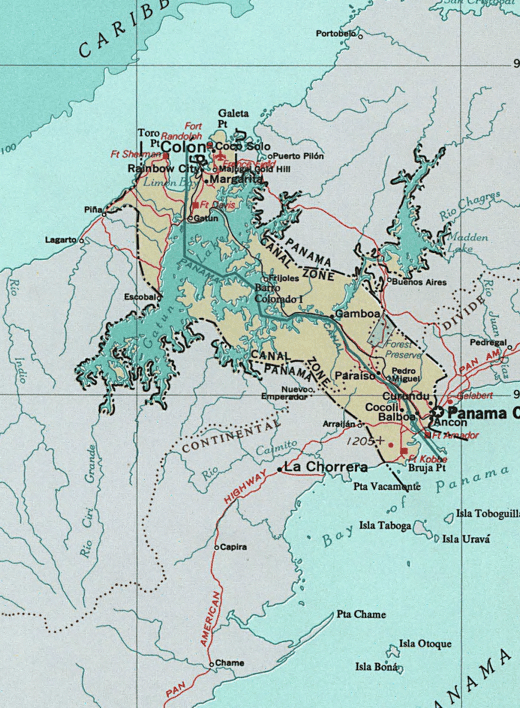
The Panama Canal Zone

Magoon's primary responsibilities within the Canal Zone were to improve sanitation and to deal with the all-too-common outbreaks of yellow fever and malaria. At first, he refused to believe that the diseases were carried by mosquitos because, he reasoned, the native population would have been more affected. At this time, the nature of human acquired immunity to diseases was not well understood. The Chicago Tribune, in an article about conditions in the canal, referred to the notion that yellow fever was carried by mosquitos as "bugaboo". However, by January 1906, Magoon had long come to understand the role of mosquitos in the transmission of diseases, as evidenced in a New York Times article wherein Magoon addressed criticisms of his administration in detail; by then he had undertaken a vigorous and ambitious plan to eliminate the swamps that bred mosquitos.

While governor, he worked with translators in the War Department to publish an English edition of the complete Civil Code of Panama, which he codified as the law of the Canal Zone on May 9, 1904. This was the first time that the complete civil code of a Spanish-speaking country not a U.S. territory had been translated into English. It was significant that he did not make changes to these laws when "importing" them into the legal system of the territory that he governed.

On July 2, 1905, President Roosevelt further consolidated power in Panama by appointing Magoon Minister to Panama, to replace John Barrett. This put Magoon in the unique position of being both a governor of a U.S. territory and a diplomat to the country of which that territory was an enclave. During the tenure of Governor Davis, there had been friction between him and Minister Barrett. This double appointment would ensure that the two roles could not work at cross-purposes. Magoon would draw two salaries in the arrangement, an issue which would come up later to haunt him. With influential posts in both Panama proper and the Canal Zone, Magoon was an exceptionally powerful man on the Isthmus.

==== Friction with Congress ====
The President was coming into increasing conflict with Congress on the handling of the Zone, including the unusual consolidation of power. In addition to not officially restructuring the Commission, Congress increasingly fought or raised questions about the appointments of replacement commissioners. In November 1905, Panama was visited by Poultney Bigelow, a lecturer and writer for the American Geographical Society, who wrote a scathing report on progress in the Canal Zone—a report that was well-publicized in the States. This report criticized the efficiency of the work being performed as well as the quality of its management. Magoon countered this negative press by stressing that Bigelow had visited the Zone for less than two days, one of which was Thanksgiving Day, and that work was naturally lax on the holiday.

In February, Magoon was called to testify before the Senate Committee responsible for Canal administration, including responding to Bigelow's report. He was criticized now for the earlier adoption of Panama's penal system in the Zone. One major point of contention was that it did not allow for trial by jury for American citizens arrested there. They raised questions as to the quality of the judges in the territory and other issues.

There was no official outcome from these hearings, but Congress subsequently passed a Consular Reform Bill which included a provision that specifically would not allow a diplomat, such as Magoon, to hold a separate administrative position. Rather than remove Magoon from one of his positions, he was named to become vice governor-general of the Philippines. Ultimately, this offer was rescinded before it could take effect, and he was instead appointed governor of Cuba. See Mellander, Gustavo A., Mellander, Nelly, Charles Edward Magoon: The Panama Years. Río Piedras, Puerto Rico: Editorial Plaza Mayor. ISBN 1-56328-155-4. OCLC 42970390. (1999), the best study of Magoon's years in Panama.

=== Cuba ===
In 1906, Cuba was in the midst of a constitutional crisis as a result of a disputed election and an attempt by elected President Tomás Estrada Palma to stay in power after the conclusion of his term. This led to a revolt, and the U.S. military sent in 5,600 men to reassert control over the country in what would be called the Second Occupation of Cuba. This was permitted under the Cuban-American Treaty of Relations of 1903, a treaty that stipulated the degree of United States intervention in Cuba. After a brief period of stabilization by Secretary Taft, Magoon was appointed governor. He ruled under the Constitution of Cuba, effectively with absolute authority and backed by the U.S. military.

On October 13, 1906, Magoon officially became Cuban governor. Magoon declined to have an official inauguration ceremony, and, instead, news of the appointment was announced to the Cuban public via the newspapers. In his written appointment address to the country, Magoon indicated that he would "perform the duties provided for by the ... constitution of Cuba for the preservation of Cuban independence". He was there, in short, to restore order and not to colonize.

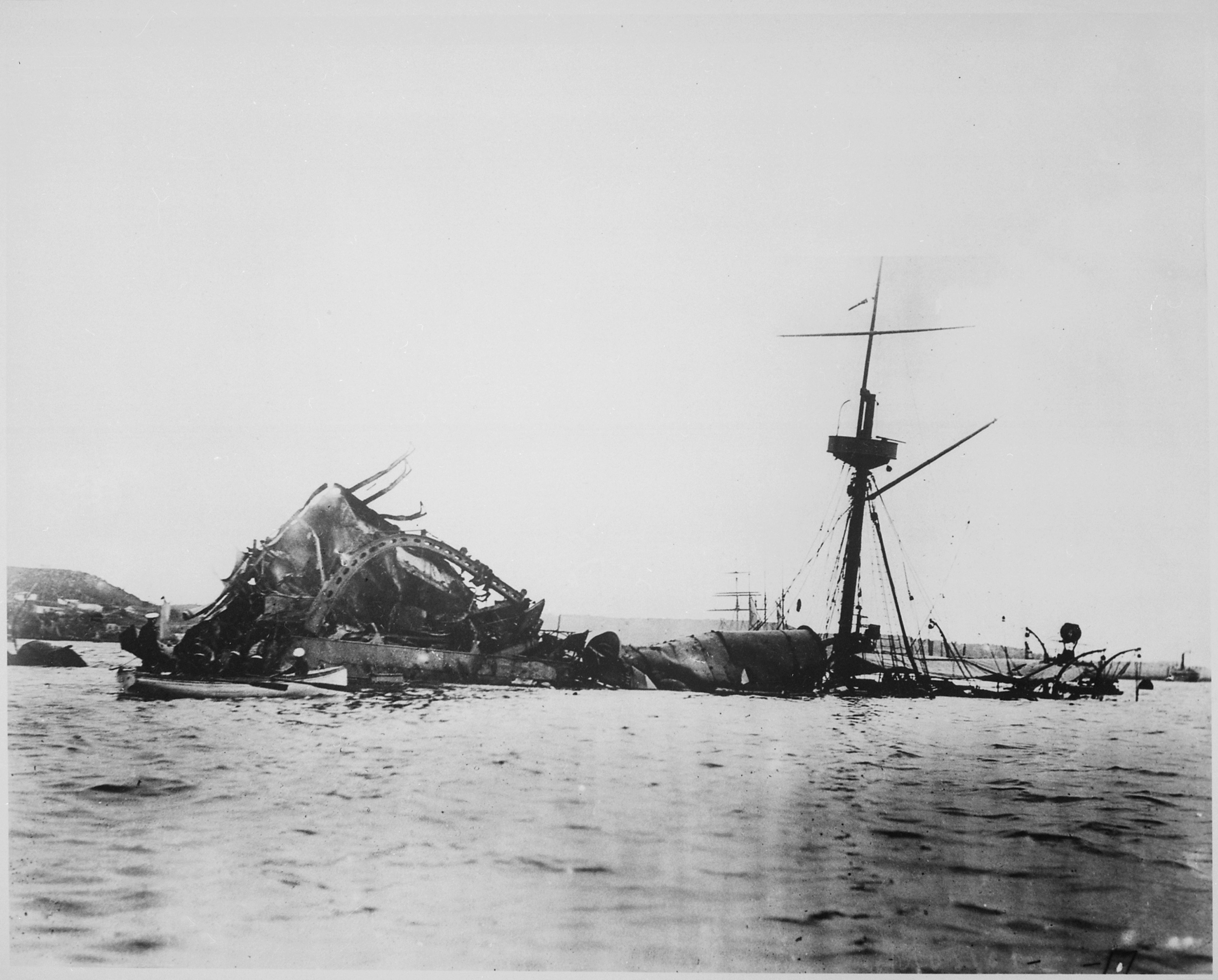
Wreckage of the USS Maine

During Magoon's time as governor, the remaining revolutionaries were defeated, and his attention was turned inward to infrastructure. He coordinated the construction of two hundred kilometers of highway. He called for the reorganization of the Cuban military into a formal army, rather than a Mexican-style "rural guard". More controversially, he called for the removal of the sunken USS Maine, the ship whose destruction led to the Spanish–American War, because it was interfering with traffic in Havana's harbor. In his yearly report to the secretary of war, Magoon reported that many Cubans held the popular belief that neither the United States nor the US-backed Cuban government had explored the wreckage because evidence might be found to suggest that the ship was not sunk by a torpedo, as was the official report—something that would cast doubt on the justification for the United States' war against Spain. The removal of the ship did not take place while Magoon was in office; it was authorized by Congress in 1910.

While he was well regarded in the United States, Magoon was not popular among Cubans. He reaped a vast number of lurid accusations at the hands of Cuban writers who described him as a "man of wax", who was "gross in character, rude in manners, of a profound ambition and greedy for despoilment". The Cuban nationalist bibliographer Carlos Manuel Trelles later wrote that Magoon "profoundly corrupted the Cuban nation, and on account of his venality was looked upon with contempt." Other Cuban historians point to the fiscal wastefulness of Magoon's tenure, which "left a bad memory and a bad example to the country" and returned Cuba to the corrupt practices of colonial times.

On January 28, 1909, the sovereign government of Cuba was restored, and José Miguel Gómez became president. No explicit evidence of Magoon's corruption ever surfaced, but his parting gesture of issuing lucrative Cuban contracts to U.S. firms was a continued point of contention. Several months later, Magoon received an official commendation from President Taft for his excellent service in Cuba.

Following his service in Cuba, Magoon retired from public service and vacationed for a year in Europe before returning to the United States. Speculation at the time pointed to him taking a position as ambassador to China, a special commission on stability in Central America, or a Cabinet position. Ultimately Magoon did not take up any of those new responsibilities and formally entered retirement. He lived quietly and died in Washington, D.C., in 1920 after complications from surgery for acute appendicitis.

== Works ==
- Magoon, Charles Edward (1902). Reports on The Law of Civil Government in Territory Subject to Military Occupation by the Military Forces of the United States, etc. Washington, D.C.: U.S. Government Printing Office. OCLC 4668092. (Also known as The Law of Civil Government under Military Occupation.)

== See also ==
- Postage stamps and postal history of the Canal Zone (Magoon commemorated on Canal Zone postage stamp)

Political offices
Preceded by George Whitefield Davis	Military Governor of Panama Canal Zone; 1905–1906	Succeeded by Richard Reid Rogers as Chief Engineer
Preceded by William Howard Taft	Provisional Governor of Cuba; 1906–1909	Succeeded by José Miguel Gómez (President of Cuba)
Diplomatic posts
Preceded by John Barrett	United States Minister to Panama; August 7, 1905 – September 25, 1906	Succeeded by Herbert G. Squiers
