= Walter Philip Leber =

American politician (1918–2009)

15th Governor of the Panama Canal Zone
- In office 1967–1971
- Preceded by: Robert John Fleming
- Succeeded by: David Stuart Parker

Personal details
- Born: September 12, 1918 Saint Louis, Missouri, U.S.
- Died: August 3, 2009 (aged 90) Palm City, Florida, U.S.
- Education: Missouri School of Mines; George Washington University

Walter Philip Leber (September 12, 1918 – August 3, 2009) was an American politician who served as the governor of the Panama Canal Zone from 1967 to 1971.

== Biography ==
Born in Saint Louis, Missouri, on September 12, 1918, Leber graduated from the Missouri School of Mines in 1940. He also earned an MBA from George Washington University in 1951. He served as the governor of the Panama Canal Zone from 1967 to 1971.

He died on August 3, 2009, in Palm City, Florida.

== Legacy ==
His honors included admission to the Order of the British Empire.

Preceded by Robert John Fleming	Governor of Panama Canal Zone; 1967–1971	Succeeded by David Stuart Parker
