= Joseph Cowles Mehaffey =

United States Army general

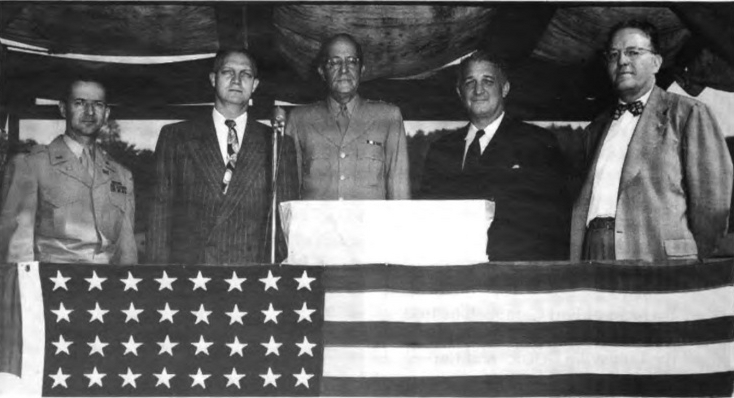
- Mehaffey (center) in 1948
- Born: November 20, 1889; Lima, Ohio, U.S.
- Died: February 18, 1963 (aged 73) Washington, D.C., U.S.
- Allegiance: United States of America
- Branch: United States Army
- Service years: 1911–1949
- Rank: Major General
- Commands: Replacement Unit No. 6, American Expeditionary Forces; Fort DuPont; Panama Canal Zone
- Awards: Distinguished Service Medal; Legion of Merit

Joseph Cowles Mehaffey (November 20, 1889 – February 18, 1963) was an American military officer and engineer. As a member of the Army Corps of Engineers, he was the consulting engineer on the Arlington Memorial Bridge in Washington, D.C.; helped renovate the White House; and served as a supervising engineer for the Works Progress Administration during the Great Depression. He was assigned in 1941 as maintenance engineer of the Panama Canal, and was governor of the Panama Canal Zone from 1944 to 1948. He held the rank of major general in the United States Army.

== Life and career ==
=== Early life ===
Mehaffey was born in November 1889 in Lima, Ohio, to William R. and Mary Brooks (Stahl) Mehaffey. His grandfather was Robert Mehaffey, an Ulster Scot who emigrated from County Tyrone, Ireland, in 1850 or 1851 at the age of 17. Settling in Lima, he established him in the grocery and then banking business, rising to the position of Vice President of the First National Bank of Lima. He later organized the Merchants National Bank and Metropolitan Bank. He was elected to two terms in the Ohio Senate, and owned a large amount of stock in the Allen County Democrat newspaper. Mehaffey's father worked in the Allen County Democrat beginning in 1885, then purchased the paper and merged it with the Daily Times to form the Lima Times Democrat (a newspaper which still exists in 2013). Joseph had an older brother, Robert Chisholm (born July 22, 1884), and an older sister, Eleanor Cowles (born October 10, 1885, and died in 1887). He also had a younger brother, William Kenneth (born August 23, 1889, and died in 1896). Mehaffey's mother died in March 1899, and his father in November 1907 married Mary E. Mount of Chatham-Kent, Ontario, Canada.

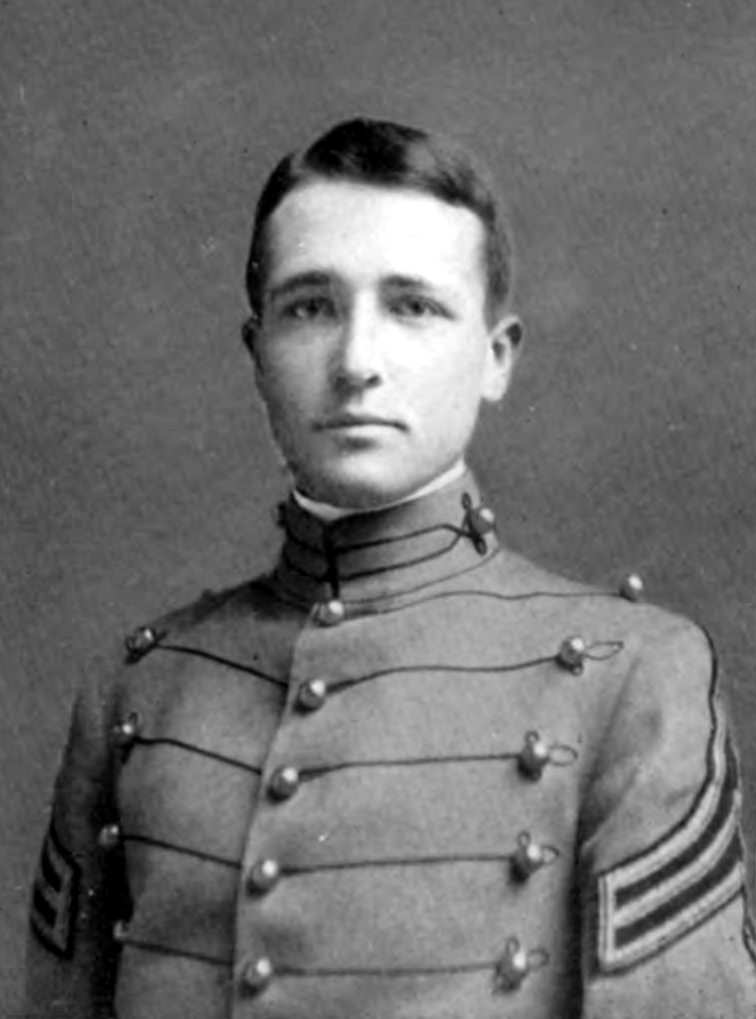
At West Point in 1911

Mehaffey was educated in the Lima public schools. As both his grandfather and father were very active in Democratic politics, he won entry to the United States Military Academy at West Point. He entered West Point on June 15, 1907, and graduated 3rd in a class of 82 on June 13, 1911. He was commissioned a 2d Lieutenant in the Army Corps of Engineers.

=== Early military career ===
Mehaffey served in Rock Island, Illinois; Memphis, Tennessee; and New Orleans, Louisiana, until November 21, 1911, at which time he was transferred to the Panama Canal Zone. He served there until June 15, 1912. After serving briefly in the Corps offices in Pittsburgh, Pennsylvania, and Wheeling, West Virginia, he was ordered on August 28, 1912, to report to the Washington Barracks of the Corps to attend engineering school. Upon his graduation on February 28, 1913, he was commissioned a 1st Lieutenant.

Mehaffey served at the Washington Barracks until October 16, 1913, when he was assigned to the 1st Engineer Regiment. He served there until May 4, 1914, when he was assigned as an assistant to the head engineer of the Eastern Department of the Army Corps of Engineers. He remained in the office only until September 1, when he was assigned to the Chief of Engineers of Washington, D.C.

On July 1, 1915, Mehaffey was made a member of the Board of Road Commissioners for the recently created Territory of Alaska. In that capacity, he was also the Chief Engineer for the board. Mehaffey spent two years in Alaska building bridges, roads, and trails throughout the territory. During his tenure there, Mehaffey was promoted to captain on July 1, 1916, and to brevet major on August 5, 1917, almost four months after the American entry into World War I. He returned to Washington, D.C., on October 25, 1917, where he served again in the office of the Chief Engineer. He was promoted to brevet lieutenant colonel on June 29, 1918. Just three months later, he was promoted to brevet colonel on October 7, 1918.

=== World War I service and later career ===
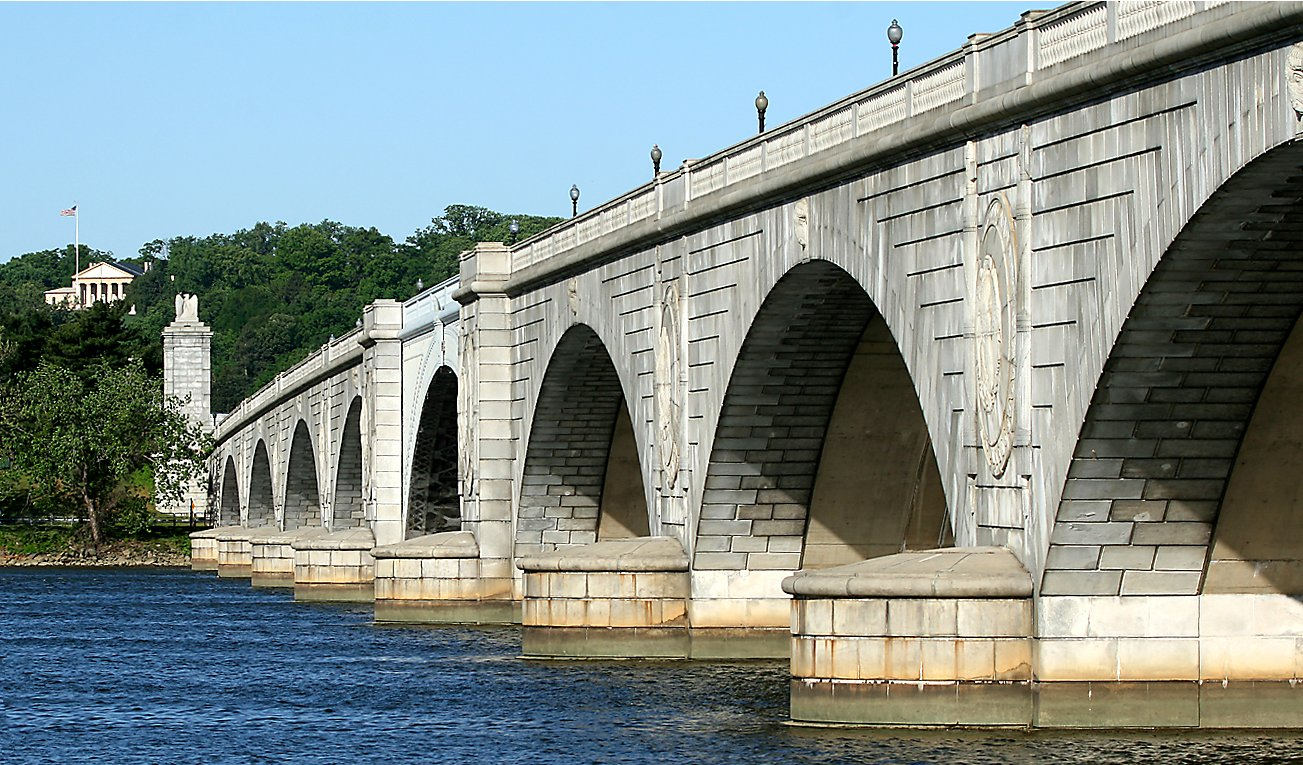
Mehaffey was an assistant on the commission which designed and built the Arlington Memorial Bridge (depicted).

On May 15, 1919, Mehaffy was assigned command of Replacement Unit No. 6 at Camp Meade in Maryland. The unit embarked for France on June 11, and from June 19 to August 1 observed operations of the American Expeditionary Forces. He was subsequently assigned Section Engineer at Base Section No. 1 in Saint-Nazaire, France. He only served there briefly, however, and on October 27 was assigned an assistant to the Engineer Purchasing Office in London, England. He was promoted to Engineer Purchasing Officer on January 1, 1920. However, with the war over, Mehaffey returned to the United States where his brevet commissions were revoked, and he returned to the rank of captain in March 1920. He did not remain at the rank long. In July 1920, Mehaffey was promoted to major and assigned to the American Liquidation Mission in England, where he helped to dispose of excess military materiel.

In 1923, Mehaffey was appointed professor of practical military engineering at West Point. After teaching there for two years, Mehaffey was appointed assistant to Colonel Clarence O. Sherrill, Director of Public Buildings and Parks for the city of Washington, D.C. Mehaffey led a reorganized Office of Buildings and Parks, which was rapidly expanding as construction continued on Rock Creek Park and the Rock Creek and Potomac Parkway. On July 16, 1925, Mehaffey was appointed assistant to the executive officer of the Arlington Memorial Bridge Commission, an independent agency of the U.S. federal government established by Congress. In that capacity, he helped oversee the design and early construction of the bridge. He also supervised the 1927 conversion of the attic of the White House into a third floor with bedrooms, bathrooms, and office space.

Mehaffey was assigned to the Panama Canal Zone in December 1929, where he served as assistant maintenance engineer. This proved to be his longest assignment to date, and lasted until August 1933. He returned to the United States and entered the United States Army Command and General Staff College, graduating in June 1935, after which he was again assigned as an assistant to the Chief of Engineers in Washington.

Mehaffey was promoted to lieutenant colonel on August 1, 1935. Upon his promotion, he was assigned to be executive assistant to the Chief Engineer of the Works Progress Administration (WPA). Although Mehaffey had responsibility over WPA projects nationwide, he primarily worked on airport, beach, pier, playground, and school projects in New York City. One of his major construction efforts was building East River Drive. During this period, Mehaffey was appointed to Assistant Administrator for Engineering for the entire WPA.

Mehaffey entered the United States Army War College in September 1938 and graduated in June 1939. He was then named post commander of Fort DuPont in Delaware on July 1, 1939, where he once again served with the 1st Engineer Regiment. In October 1939, the unit was reorganized as the 1st Engineer Battalion. He was promoted to colonel in January 1940. In November 1940, Mehaffey was appointed engineer of the First Army Corps in South Carolina.

== Panama Canal Zone and retirement ==
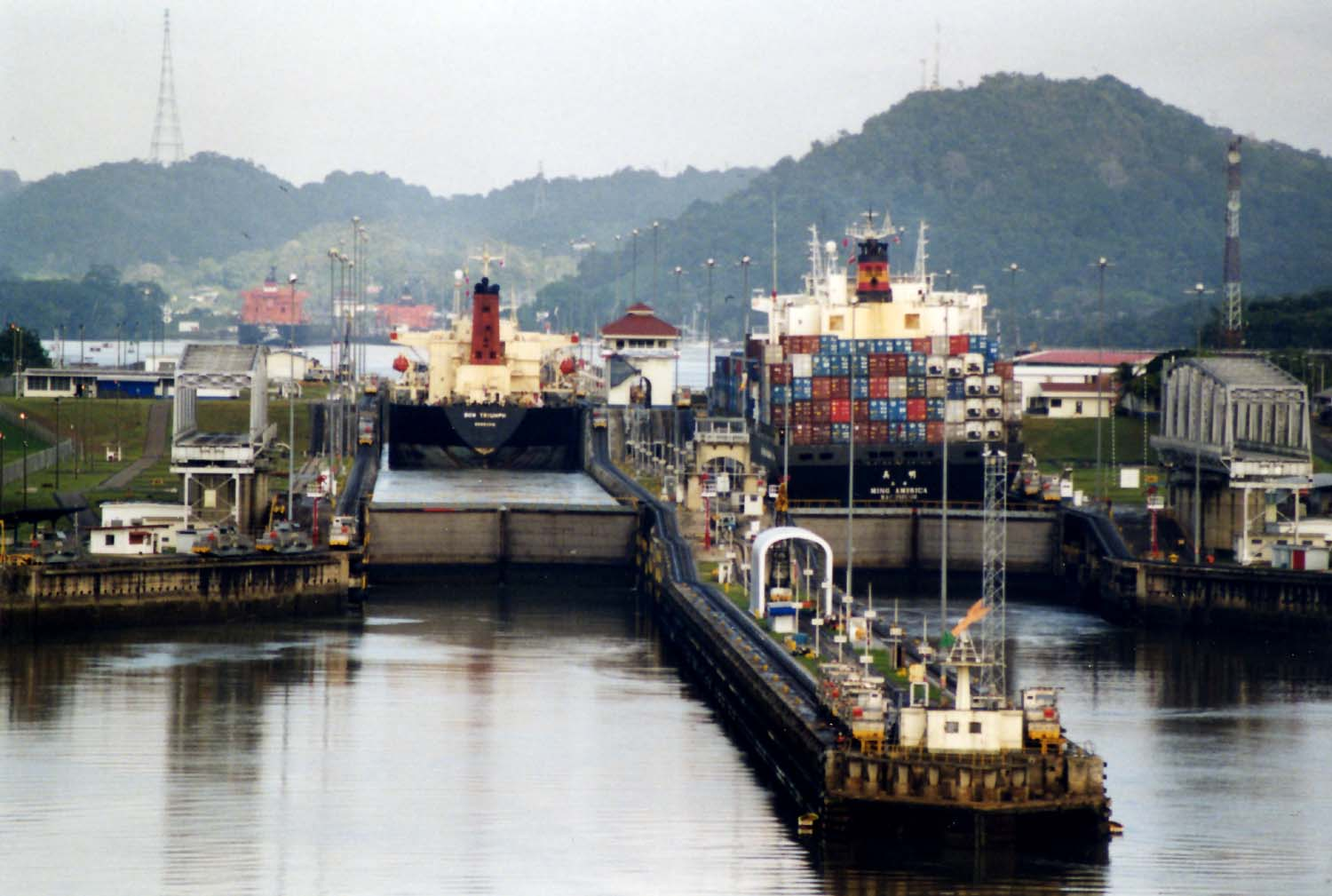
Mehaffey began construction on the Miraflores locks (depicted) in 1940.

In September 1941, Mehaffey was appointed engineer of maintenance in the Panama Canal Zone. He served in this position until 1944. During this time, he undertook construction of the Miraflores Locks and the Transithmian Highway. He received the Legion of Merit for his work.

Mahaffey was promoted to brevet brigadier general in June 1942.

The U.S. Army considered the security of the Panama Canal second only to the security of the continental United States during the war. After attacks by Nazi German submarines in June 1942, an anti-submarine air patrol was established at Coco Solo naval base near the eastern entrance to the canal, and the United States Navy began convoying cargo ships to and from the area.

On May 15, 1944, Mahaffey was appointed governor of the Panama Canal. He was promoted to major general in June 1944. Although canal traffic plunged in 1942 to levels not seen since 1918, the invasion of France and collapse of Nazi Germany shifted hundreds of thousands of troops to the Pacific theater. During this period, Mehaffey oversaw operation of the canal while record amounts of traffic moved through it. At one point in 1945, more than 100 ships waited at the eastern entrance to the canal. During his tenure, Mehaffey also conducted the Isthmian Canal Studies in 1947. Better known as the "Mahaffey Report", the studies wproposed getting rid of the canal locks and constructing a sea-level canal at a cost of $3.5 billion. No action was taken on the report, but Mahaffey received the Army Distinguished Service Medal for his work as governor.

Mehaffey retired as governor in 1948 after his four-year term expired. He was assigned to the Ohio River Division of the Army Corps of Engineers.

Joseph Mehaffey retired from the U.S. Army in 1949. In February 1950, he joined the Koppers Company, working as an engineer on various projects in Turkey. He left the firm in 1952. He joined the International Bank for Reconstruction and Development (IBRD) in 1953 as chief of the bank's transportation division. He retired from IBRD in 1955, although he continued to consult on engineering issues for it until the time of his death.

Mehaffey lived the last few years of his life in Washington, D.C. He suffered a brief, undisclosed illness in January 1953, and died at Walter Reed General Hospital on February 18, 1963. Mehaffey was buried at Arlington National Cemetery three days later.

Joseph Mehaffey never married. He was a fellow of the American Society of Civil Engineers, a member of the Society of American Military Engineers, and a member of the Army and Navy Club.

== Bibliography ==
- Current Biography Yearbook. New York, H.W. Wilson, 1949.
- Mackie, Branden; Morrill, Peter K.; and Lee, Laura M. Fort Dupont. Charleston, S.C.: Arcadia Pub., 2011.
- Millett, John D. The Works Progress Administration in New York City. Chicago: Social Science Research Council, 1938.
- Morison, Samuel Eliot. History of United States Naval Operations in World War II: The Battle of the Atlantic, September 1939-May 1943. Urbana, Ill.: University of Illinois Press, 2001.
- Panama Canal Company. Living and Working in the Canal Zone. Canal Zone, Panama: The Panama Canal Company, 1958.
- Pérez, Orlando J. "Nationalism and the Challenge to Canal Security." In Latin America During World War II. Thomas M. Leonard and John F. Bratzel, eds. Lanham, Md.: Rowman & Littlefield, 2007.
- Powell, Thomas Edward. The Democratic Party of the State of Ohio: A Comprehensive History of Democracy in Ohio From 1803 to 1912. Columbus, Ohio: Ohio Pub. Co., 1913.
- Rusler, William. A Standard History of Allen County, Ohio. Chicago: American historical Society, 1921.
- West Point Alumni Foundation. Register of Graduates and Former Cadets. West Point, N.Y.: West Point Alumni Foundation, 1984.

Preceded by Glen Edgar Edgerton	Governor of Panama Canal Zone; 1944–1948	Succeeded by Francis K. Newcomer
