= Glen Edgar Edgerton =

United States Army general

Glen Edgerton
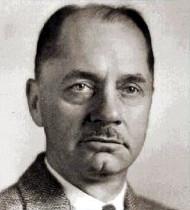
- Edgerton circa 1940

8th governor of the Panama Canal Zone
- In office 1940–1944
- Preceded by: Clarence Self Ridley
- Succeeded by: Joseph Cowles Mehaffey

Personal details
- Born: April 17, 1887 Parkerville, Kansas, U.S.
- Died: April 9, 1976 (aged 88) Bethesda Naval Hospital, U.S.
- Resting place: Arlington National Cemetery
- Education: Kansas State College; United States Military Academy

Military service
- Allegiance: United States of America
- Branch/service: United States Army
- Years of service: 1908–1949
- Rank: Major General
- Unit: Corps of Engineers

Glen Edgar Edgerton (April 17, 1887 – April 9, 1976) was a United States Army officer, who served as governor of the Panama Canal Zone from 1940 to 1944.

== Biography ==
Edgerton was born on April 17, 1887, to Alice and John Edgar Edgerton. He graduated from Kansas State College in 1904 and from the United States Military Academy at West Point in 1908, where he was first in his class. While there he often tutored other students, including George S. Patton. He plotted the route of the Panama Canal through the jungle and chased Pancho Villa in Mexico. He was chief engineer of the Alaska Road Commission from 1910 to 1915 and the Edgerton Highway in Alaska is named after him. After World War I he directed war relief in China. He also went to the military Engineering Academy.

He served as Panama Canal maintenance engineer from 1936 to 1940. He was governor of the Panama Canal Zone from 1940 to 1944. He retired from the army in 1949 and in that year became project manager for the White House interior reconstruction project, leaving a project to divert the Euphrates River in Iraq to do so.

Preceded by Clarence S. Ridley	Governor of Panama Canal Zone; 1940–1944	Succeeded by Joseph C. Mehaffey
