= Julian Larcombe Schley =

United States Army general

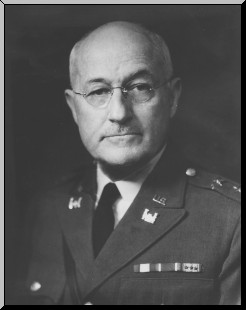
- Schley c. 1940

6th Governor of the Panama Canal Zone
- In office 1932–1936
- Preceded by: Harry Burgess
- Succeeded by: Clarence Self Ridley

Chief of Engineers
- In office 1937–1941
- Preceded by: Edward Murphy Markham
- Succeeded by: Eugene Reybold

Personal details
- Born: February 23, 1880 Savannah, Georgia, U.S.
- Died: March 29, 1965 (aged 85) Walter Reed Hospital; Washington, D.C., U.S.
- Resting place: Arlington National Cemetery

Military service
- Allegiance: United States of America
- Branch/service: United States Army
- Years of service: 1903–1941, 1943–1945
- Rank: Major General
- Commands: Chief of Engineers; Army Engineer School; 307th Engineers
- Battles/wars: World War I: Western Front; World War II
- Awards: Distinguished Service Medal

Julian Larcombe Schley (February 23, 1880 – March 29, 1965) was an American military officer who was Chief of Engineers of the U.S. Army and served as Governor of the Panama Canal Zone.

== Biography ==
Schley was born in Savannah, Georgia, on February 23, 1880. He attended the Lawrenceville School in New Jersey, graduating in 1898. Schley graduated from the United States Military Academy at West Point in June 1903 and was commissioned in the Corps of Engineers.

He and classmate Douglas MacArthur had their first service with the 3d Battalion of Engineers in Compton from 1904 to 1905. Schley later served with engineer troops in the United States and Cuba; as an instructor at the Military Academy; as Assistant Engineer, Washington, D.C.; and as New Orleans District Engineer.

During World War I, he commanded the divisional 307th Engineers in the St. Mihiel and Meuse-Argonne offensives and was Engineer, 5th Army Corps, during the last two weeks of the latter drive. He received a Distinguished Service Medal for his service during the war.

Schley was Director of Purchase, General Staff, and a member of the War Department Claims Board from 1919 to 1920. Schley later served four-year tours as Galveston District Engineer; Engineer of Maintenance, Panama Canal; and Governor of the Canal Zone. In the latter post, he was also military advisor to the Republic of Panama. Schley was Commandant of the Army Engineer School in 1936 – 1937. In October, 1937, Schley was named as Chief Engineer of the U.S. Army Corps of Engineers. (Note: At the time, he was traveling in Oklahoma, inspecting some of the Corps' dam-building projects in that state. Rather than interrupting his schedule for an immediate ceremony in Washington, he made a short hop to Oklahoma City, where Monroe Osborn, then Chief Justice of the Oklahoma Supreme Court, administered the oath of office to him, in lieu of the President Franklin D. Roosevelt. Schley then continued on his planned inspection tour.) He retired on September 30, 1941.

Schley was recalled to active wartime duty in 1943 as Director of Transportation, Office of the Coordinator of Inter-American Affairs. He served until December 31, 1945, before retiring again.

Schley died March 29, 1965, at Walter Reed Hospital in Washington, D.C., aged 85. He was interred at Arlington National Cemetery four days later.

== Notes ==
Political offices
| Preceded by Harry Burgess | Governor of Panama Canal Zone; 1932–1936 | Succeeded by Clarence S. Ridley |
Military offices
| Preceded by Edward Murphy Markham | Chief of Engineers; 1937—1941 | Succeeded by Eugene Reybold |
