= 283rd Engineer Detachment (Terrain Analysis) =

283d Engineer Detachment
- 20th Engineer Brigade shoulder sleeve insignia
- Active: 16 August 1950 – 12 December 1958; 1 May 1967 – 20 September 1971; 21 June 1974 – 1989
- Country: United States
- Branch: United States Army
- Type: Combat engineer
- Role: Terrain Analysis
- Size: 10-12
- Part of: XVIII Airborne Corps
- Garrison/HQ: Fort Bragg (North Carolina, USA)
- Mascot: Wasp
- Engagements: Vietnam War; Invasion of Grenada

Commanders
- Notable commanders: Major Thoms G. VanSlyke

The 283d Engineer Detachment (Terrain Analysis) was a combat engineer detachment assigned to the 20th Engineer Brigade of the United States Army stationed at Fort Bragg, North Carolina. Although the members of the unit wore blue airborne tabs as part of the brigade's shoulder patch, jump status was optional but encouraged.

The detachment, commanded by a field grade officer, consisted of approximately 10–12 personnel, half of which were company grade officers. The executive officer was a captain. Military occupational specialties (MOS) of the enlisted personnel included soils analysts, cartographic drafters, terrain analysts and clerk typists. At a minimum unit members held secret security clearance with officers and some non-commissioned officers holding Top Secret clearances. The detachment had a former Army Security Agency cartographic specialist with Top Secret security credentials in crypt o-analysis, special intelligence and NATO access assigned at one time.

The primary mission of the 283d was to provide land analysis for worldwide missions of the XVIII Airborne Corps. It was primarily sequestered away from the brigade area and its members were required not to discuss its work outside of its secure location.

The detachment was so small that it was part of a provisional battalion of the 20th Engineer Brigade and relied on its sister unit, the 63d Engineer Company, for its logistical support. 283d members were exempt from inspections, formal physical training routines, morning formations and the common extra duties required of other brigade members. Because of the nature of its work and close personal contact among its members the distinctions between officers and enlisted members were more relaxed than typical units but still maintained high 'esprit de corps' and discipline. By 1977 the brigade newspaper, 'The Level Line', noted that the 283d had no record of AWOL members. 'The Level Line' name was one of numerous suggestions submitted by 283rd personnel, 2LT Szigeti and SP5 Leviner et al., and was adopted for the newspaper by brigade. The unit adopted the mascot of the wasp by mid-1978. Additionally, from 1978–1981, the unit recorded 100% accuracy on SIDPERS transactions, achieved by SSG W.E. Truxon, and to date, has never been achieved during a 36-month period in any other military unit.
