= J. C. S. Blackburn =

American politician (1838–1918)

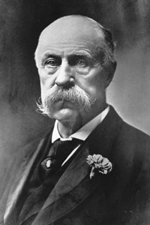

Governor of Panama Canal Zone
- In office April 1, 1907 – December 4, 1909
- Appointed by: Theodore Roosevelt
- Preceded by: Richard Reid Rogers
- Succeeded by: Maurice Thatcher

Chairman of the Senate Democratic Caucus
- In office June 4, 1906 – March 4, 1907
- Preceded by: Arthur Pue Gorman
- Succeeded by: Charles Allen Culberson

United States Senator from Kentucky
- In office March 4, 1901 – March 4, 1907
- Preceded by: William Lindsay
- Succeeded by: Thomas H. Paynter
- In office March 4, 1885 – March 4, 1897
- Preceded by: John S. Williams
- Succeeded by: William J. Deboe

Member of the U.S. House of Representatives from Kentucky's 7th district
- In office March 4, 1875 – March 3, 1885
- Preceded by: James B. Beck
- Succeeded by: William Breckinridge

Chairman of the Democratic Congressional Campaign Committee
- In office 1878
- Succeeded by: William A. Wallace

Member of the Kentucky House of Representatives from Woodford County
- In office August 7, 1871 – March 4, 1875
- Preceded by: James P. Ford
- Succeeded by: John A. Steele

Personal details
- Born: Joseph Clay Stiles Blackburn; October 1, 1838 Spring Station, Kentucky, U.S.
- Died: September 12, 1918 (aged 79) Washington, D.C., U.S.
- Party: Democratic
- Relatives: Luke P. Blackburn (Brother) James W. Blackburn (Brother)
- Education: Centre College (BA)

Joseph Clay Stiles Blackburn (October 1, 1838 – September 12, 1918) was an American politician and lawyer who was a Democratic U.S. representative and senator from Kentucky and governor of Panama Canal Zone. A skilled and spirited orator, he was a prominent trial lawyer known for his skill at swaying juries.

== Biography ==
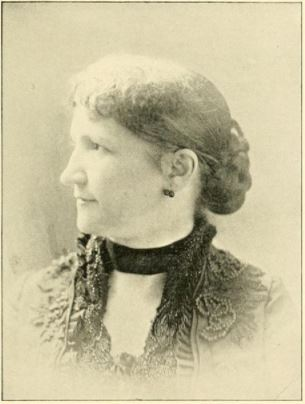
Mrs Joseph Clay Stiles Blackburn

Blackburn was born on October 1, 1838, near Spring Station, Kentucky. He was the younger brother of Kentucky governor Luke P. Blackburn.

He attended Sayres Institute in Frankfort and graduated from Centre College in Danville in 1857. He studied law in Lexington and was admitted to the bar in 1858, the same year he married Theresa (Therese) Graham (1839–1886). He practiced in Chicago until 1860 when he returned to Woodford County, Kentucky, and entered the Confederate Army as a private in 1861.

A staff officer, by the end of the Civil War Blackburn had attained the rank of lieutenant colonel. After the war he settled in Arkansas, where he was engaged as a lawyer and a planter in Desha County until 1868 when he returned to Kentucky and opened law offices in Versailles.

He was a member of the State house of representatives from 1871 to 1875. He was then elected as a Democrat to the Forty-fourth and to the four succeeding Congresses (March 4, 1875 - March 3, 1885). He was the chairman of the Committee on the District of Columbia (Forty-fifth Congress) and the Committee on Expenditures in the Department of War (Forty-fifth and Forty-sixth Congresses).

In 1885, U.S. Army Lt. Henry T. Allen named a mountain after Joseph Blackburn. Mount Blackburn is the highest peak in the Wrangell Mountains of the state of Alaska and the fifth highest peak in the United States.

He was elected to the United States Senate in 1884, was reelected in 1890, and served from March 4, 1885, to March 3, 1897. He failed to be reelected in 1896. He was the chairman of the Committee on Rules (Fifty-third Congress). He was once again elected to the United States Senate in 1900 and served from March 4, 1901, to March 3, 1907, but failed in his next election bid in 1906. Loosely associated with the free-silver wing of the Democratic party, he was well known nationally and his name was placed in nomination for the presidency in 1896.

He was appointed governor of the Panama Canal Zone by President Theodore Roosevelt on April 1, 1907. He resigned and returned to his estate in Woodford County.

He died on September 12, 1918, in Washington, D.C. He was interred in the Frankfort Cemetery.

U.S. House of Representatives
Preceded by James B. Beck	Member of the U.S. House of Representatives from Kentucky's 7th congressional district 1875–1885	Succeeded by William Breckinridge
Preceded by Aylett Hawes Buckner	Chair of the House District of Columbia Committee; 1877–1879	Succeeded by Eppa Hunton
Preceded by William M. Robbins	Chair of the House War Department Expenditures Committee; 1877–1881	Succeeded by James Frankland Briggs
U.S. Senate
Preceded by John S. Williams	U.S. Senator (Class 3) from Kentucky; 1885–1897; Served alongside: James B. Beck, John G. Carlisle, William Lindsay	Succeeded by William J. Deboe
Preceded by Nelson W. Aldrich	Chair of the Senate Rules Committee; 1893–1895	Succeeded by Nelson W. Aldrich
Preceded by William Lindsay	U.S. Senator (Class 2) from Kentucky; 1901–1907; Served alongside: William Deboe, James B. McCreary	Succeeded by Thomas H. Paynter
Party political offices
Preceded by Arthur Pue Gorman	Chair of the Senate Democratic Caucus; 1906–1907	Succeeded by Charles Allen Culberson
Political offices
Preceded by Richard Reid Rogers	Governor of Panama Canal Zone; 1890–1899	Succeeded by Maurice Thatcher
