= Harry Burgess (military officer) =

United States Army general

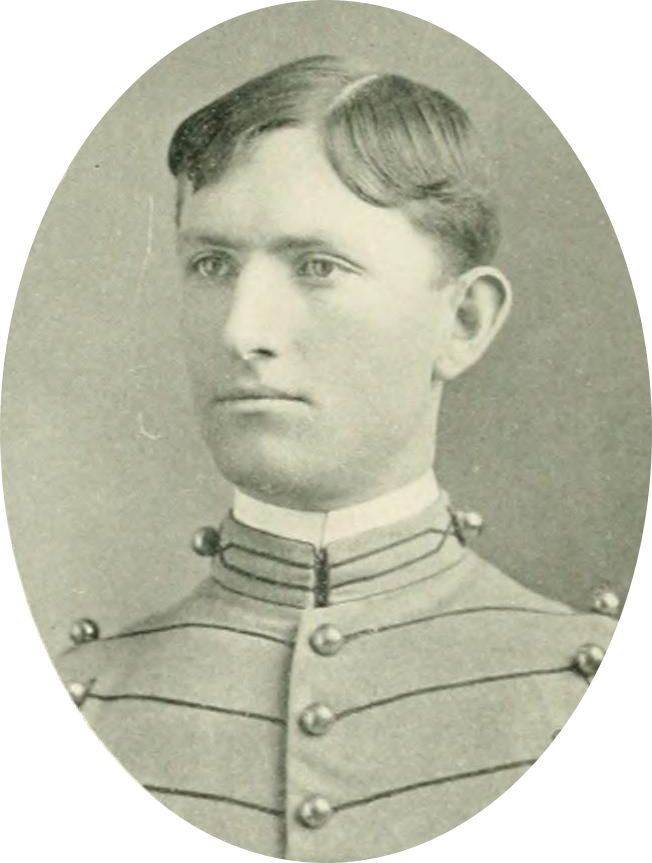
- Burgess as a West Point cadet in 1895

5th Governor of the Panama Canal Zone
- In office 1928–1932
- Preceded by: Meriwether Lewis Walker
- Succeeded by: Julian Larcombe Schley

Personal details
- Born: February 22, 1872 Starkville, Mississippi, US
- Died: March 18, 1933 (aged 61) Hot Springs, Arkansas, US
- Resting place: Arlington National Cemetery

Military service
- Allegiance: United States of America
- Branch/service: United States Army
- Years of service: 1895–1933
- Rank: Brigadier General
- Unit: Corps of Engineers
- Commands: 16th Regiment of Engineers (Railway); Company E, Battalion of Engineers
- Battles/wars: Spanish–American War; Philippine–American War; World War I
- Awards: Order of St Michael and St George (U.K.)

Harry Burgess (February 22, 1872 – March 18, 1933) was an American military officer who served as governor of the Panama Canal Zone from 1928 to 1932.

== Biography ==
Burgess was born on February 22, 1872, in Starkville, Mississippi. He attended the Agricultural and Mechanical College of Mississippi for three years before entered the United States Military Academy at West Point in June 1891.

Burgess graduated second in his class from the U.S. Military Academy in June 1895, and was commissioned in the U.S. Army Corps of Engineers. During the Spanish–American War, he was assigned to the defense of the harbor at Galveston, Texas. Burgess then taught practical military engineering at West Point from December 1898 to June 1900. From 1900 to 1901, he served in the Philippines during the Philippine Insurrection, commanding Company E, Battalion of Engineers from October 1900 to May 1901. Burgess was promoted to captain in January 1904, major in September 1909 and lieutenant colonel in November 1916.

During World War I, Burgess was temporarily promoted to colonel from July 1917 to October 1919. He served as commander of the 16th Regiment of Engineers (Railway) which was organized and trained in the city of Detroit at the Michigan State Fairgrounds. His unit built the railroad infrastructure for the American Expeditionary Force in France.

Burgess received a permanent promotion to colonel on July 1, 1920. He served as the Panama Canal maintenance engineer 1924–1928. Burgess served as Governor of the Panama Canal Zone 1928–1932. He was subsequently promoted to brigadier general on June 1, 1932.

Burgess died on March 18, 1933, at the Army and Navy General Hospital in Hot Springs, Arkansas, while still on active duty. He was interred at Arlington National Cemetery three days later.

Preceded by Meriwether L. Walker	Governor of Panama Canal Zone; 1928–1932	Succeeded by Julian Larcombe Schley
