= Clarence S. Ridley =

United States Army general (1883–1969)

Clarence Self Ridley
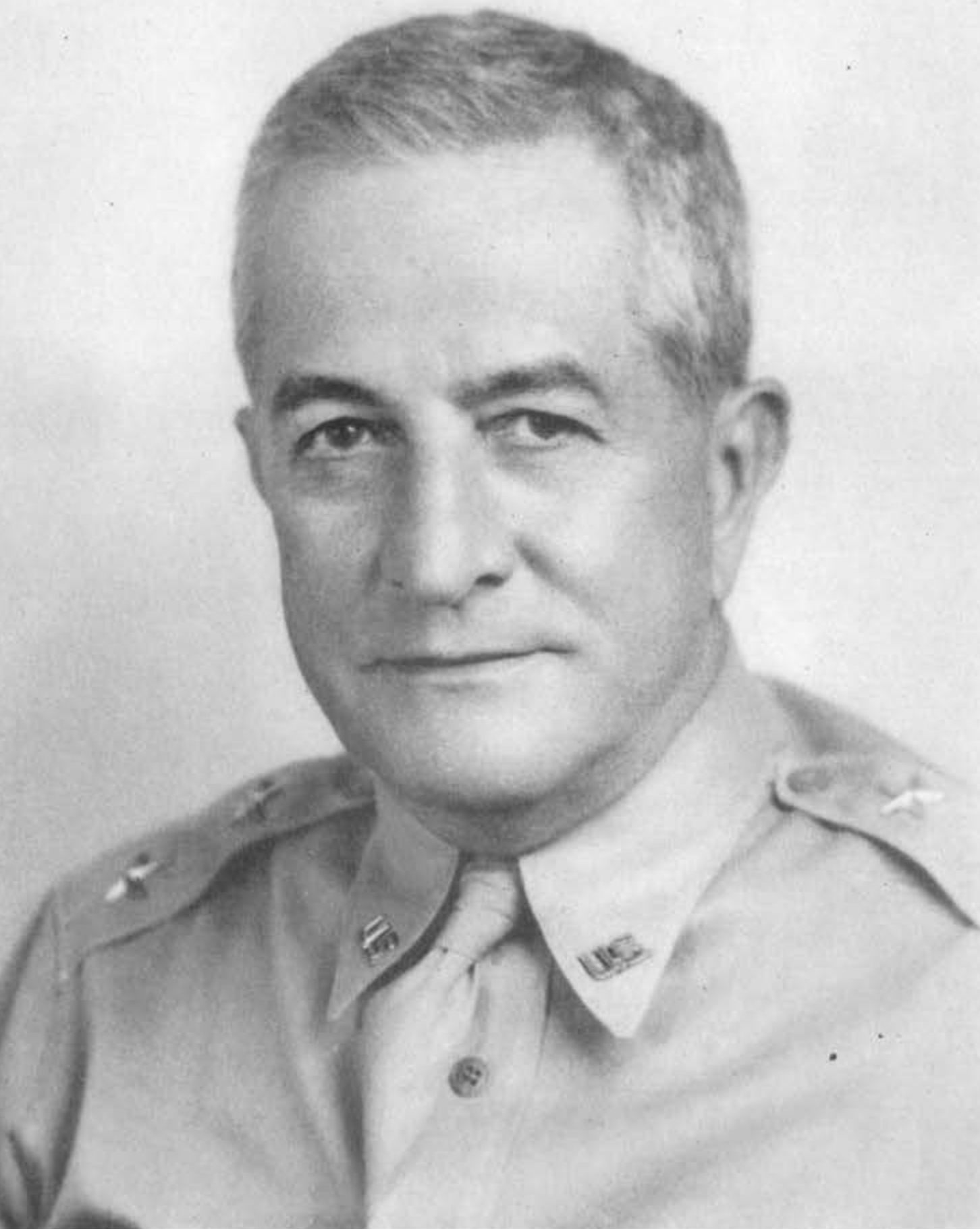
- Ridley as 6th Infantry Division commander c. 1941

7th Governor of the Panama Canal Zone
- In office 1936–1940
- Preceded by: Julian Larcombe Schley
- Succeeded by: Glen Edgar Edgerton

Personal details
- Born: June 22, 1883 Corydon, Indiana, U.S.
- Died: July 26, 1969 (aged 86) Carmel, California, U.S.
- Education: United States Military Academy

Military service
- Allegiance: United States
- Branch/service: United States Army
- Years of service: 1905–1947
- Rank: Major General
- Unit: United States Army Corps of Engineers
- Commands: 6th Infantry Division
- Battles/wars: World War I World War II
- Awards: Army Distinguished Service Medal

Clarence Self Ridley (June 22, 1883 – July 26, 1969) was an American military officer who served as the governor of the Panama Canal Zone from 1936 to 1940.

== Biography ==
Ridley was born in Corydon, Indiana on June 22, 1883, to Judge William Ridley.

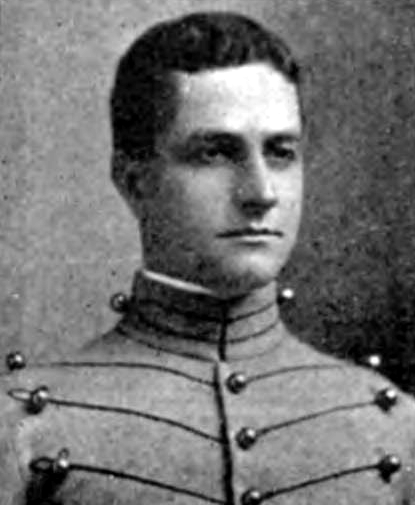
At West Point in 1905

Ridley graduated fourth in a class of 114 from the United States Military Academy at West Point in 1905. He was commissioned second lieutenant in the U.S. Army Corps of Engineers. In 1917, Ridley was appointed senior military aide to President Wilson. He supervised construction of the Lincoln Memorial. After World War I, Ridley graduated from the Command and General Staff School in 1925, the Army War College in 1931 and the Army Industrial College in 1932. He then served as an instructor at the Army Industrial College.

Ridley served as Governor of the Panama Canal Zone from 1936 to 1940. He was promoted to brigadier general effective October 1, 1938 and received a temporary promotion to major general on February 14, 1941. During World War II, he was commanding general of the 6th Infantry Division from January 1941 to August 1942. Ridley then served as chief of the U.S. Military Mission to Iran from 1942 to 1946, for which he was awarded the Army Distinguished Service Medal, the citation for which reads:

The President of the United States of America, authorized by Act of Congress July 9, 1918, takes pleasure in presenting the Army Distinguished Service Medal to Major General Clarence Self Ridley (ASN: 0-2024), United States Army, for exceptionally meritorious and distinguished services to the Government of the United States, in a duty of great responsibility during the period from November 1942 to October 1945. The singularly distinctive accomplishments of General Ridley reflect the highest credit upon himself and the United States Army.

His promotion to major general was made permanent on February 27, 1947, and he retired from active duty on June 30, 1947, after forty-two years of service.

Ridley died on July 26, 1969, in Carmel, California. He was buried at the West Point Cemetery on October 21, 1969.

Preceded by Julian Larcombe Schley	Governor of Panama Canal Zone; 1936–1940	Succeeded by Glen Edgar Edgerton
