= Harold Parfitt =

United States Army general (1921–2006)

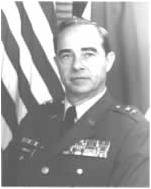

17th Governor of the Panama Canal Zone
- In office 1975–1979
- Appointed by: Gerald Ford
- Preceded by: David Stuart Parker
- Succeeded by: Office abolished

Personal details
- Born: Harold Robert Parfitt; August 6, 1921 Coaldale, Pennsylvania, U.S.
- Died: May 21, 2006 (aged 84) Dallas, Texas, U.S.
- Party: Republican
- Spouse: Patricia Rose Scully (m. 1955)
- Education: United States Military Academy; Massachusetts Institute of Technology; Command and General Staff College; Canadian National Defense College

Military service
- Allegiance: United States of America
- Branch/service: United States Army
- Years of service: 1943–1975
- Rank: Major General

Harold Robert Parfitt (August 6, 1921 – May 21, 2006) was an American military officer and engineer who was the last Governor of the Panama Canal Zone, from 1975 to 1979.

== Biography ==
He was born in Coaldale, Pennsylvania, on August 6, 1921, to William Parfitt and Elizabeth Patterson.

He graduated from the United States Military Academy at West Point in 1943; graduated from the Massachusetts Institute of Technology in 1948; graduated from the Command and General Staff College in 1955; Canadian National Defense College in 1962; and attended a six-week advanced management program at Harvard in 1967. He married Patricia Rose Scully on June 4, 1955.

Parfitt was commissioned second lieutenant of the United States Army in 1943; advanced through the ranks to major general in 1971. He served as commanding general, United States Army Engineer Center/Commandant, United States Engineer School at Fort Belvoir, Virginia, from late 1973 to March 1975.

He was Deputy, and later District Engineer of the Engineer Division, South Atlantic, in Jacksonville, Florida, from August 1962 to May 1965. In June 1965, he became lieutenant governor of the Canal Zone and vice president of the Panama Canal Company, serving until September 1968.

From December 1969 to August 1973, he was division engineer, U.S. Army Engineer Division, Southwest, Dallas, Texas. Parfitt was commanding officer of the 20th Engineer Brigade in Vietnam from November 1968 to November 1969.

Parfitt was appointed as Governor of the Panama Canal Zone on April 1, 1975, and served in that position until September 30, 1979. He was the last U.S. governor of this region, as the post was abolished and replaced with the Panama Canal Commission.

Parfitt died on May 21, 2006, in Dallas, Texas. Interment was at Arlington National Cemetery.

== Legacy ==
He is the father of Karen Hughes, who was a close advisor to president George W. Bush.

Preceded by David Stuart Parker	Governor of Panama Canal Zone; 1975–1979	Succeeded by Office abolished
