= Meriwether Lewis Walker =

United States Army general

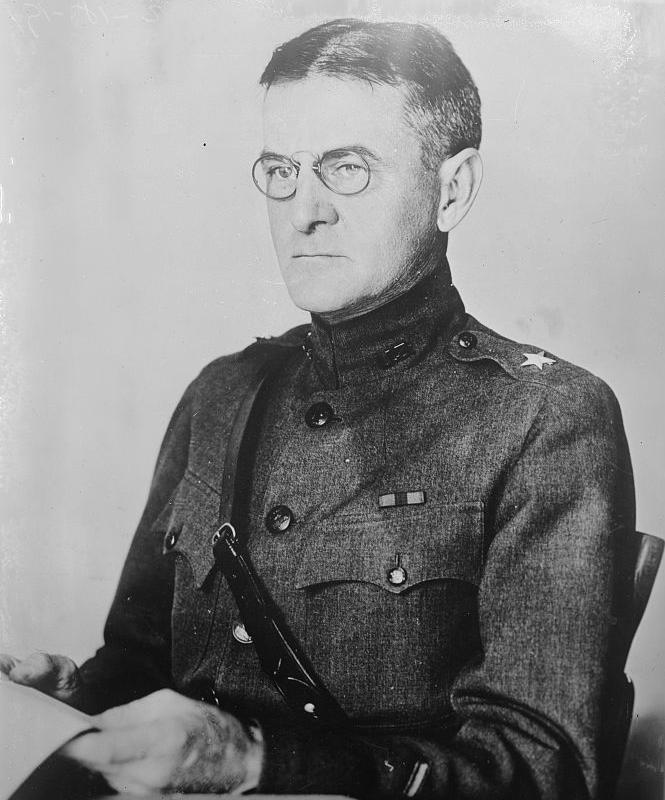

4th Governor of the Panama Canal Zone
- In office 1924–1928
- Preceded by: Jay Johnson Morrow
- Succeeded by: Harry Burgess

Personal details
- Born: September 30, 1869 Lynchburg, Virginia, U.S.
- Died: July 29, 1947 (aged 77) Massachusetts, U.S.
- Military career
- Allegiance: United States of America
- Branch: United States Army
- Service years: 1893–1933
- Rank: Brigadier General
- Service number: 0-419
- Conflicts: Pancho Villa Expedition; World War I
- Awards: Distinguished Service Medal

Meriwether Lewis Walker (September 30, 1869 – July 29, 1947) was an American military officer in the United States Army with the rank of Brigadier General, who served as a Governor of the Panama Canal Zone from 1924 to 1928.

== Biography ==
Walker was born on September 30, 1869, in Lynchburg, Virginia as the son of Thomas Lidsay and Catherine Dabney Walker.

He attended the United States Military Academy at West Point and graduated from this institution in the summer of 1893. He was also commissioned a second lieutenant in the U.S. Army Corps of Engineers.

He served as a director of the Army Field Engineering School from 1912 to 1914. He served as chief engineer of Punitive Expeditions into Mexico from 1916 to 1917. He was chief engineer of American Expeditionary Forces from August 1918 to August 1919. He was chief maintenance engineer of the Panama Canal from 1921 to 1924. He served as Panama Canal Zone Governor from 1924 to 1928. He commanded the First Corps Area from March 9, 1930 to October 7, 1930.

Walker was married to Edith Colby Carey, the daughter of Brigadier General Asa B. Carey.

He died on July 29, 1947.

== Decorations ==
Here is the ribbon bar of Brigadier General Walker:

1st Row	Army Distinguished Service Medal	Mexican Service Medal	World War I Victory Medal with two battle Clasps	Officer of the Legion of Honour (France)

Preceded by Jay Johnson Morrow	Governor of Panama Canal Zone; 1924–1928	Succeeded by Harry Burgess
