= Robert John Fleming =

Governor of the Panama Canal Zone

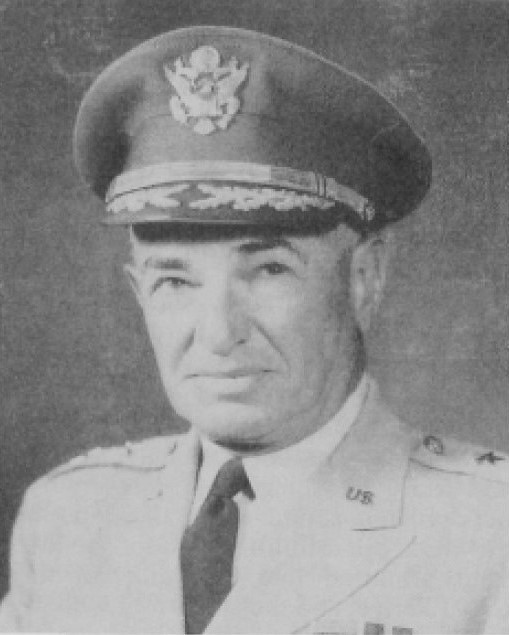

14th Governor of the Panama Canal Zone
- In office 1962–1967
- Preceded by: William Arnold Carter
- Succeeded by: Walter Philip Leber

Personal details
- Born: January 13, 1907 Fort Robinson, U.S.
- Died: July 14, 1984 (aged 77) Palo Alto, California, U.S.
- Education: United States Military Academy; Massachusetts Institute of Technology; National War College

Military service
- Allegiance: United States
- Branch/service: United States Army
- Years of service: 1928–1967
- Rank: Major General
- Battles/wars: World War II
- Awards: Distinguished Service Medal; Legion of Merit; Bronze Star Medal

Robert John Fleming Jr. (January 13, 1907 – July 14, 1984) was an American military officer who was Governor of the Panama Canal Zone from 1962 to 1967.

== Biography ==
Fleming as a United States Military Academy cadet c. 1928

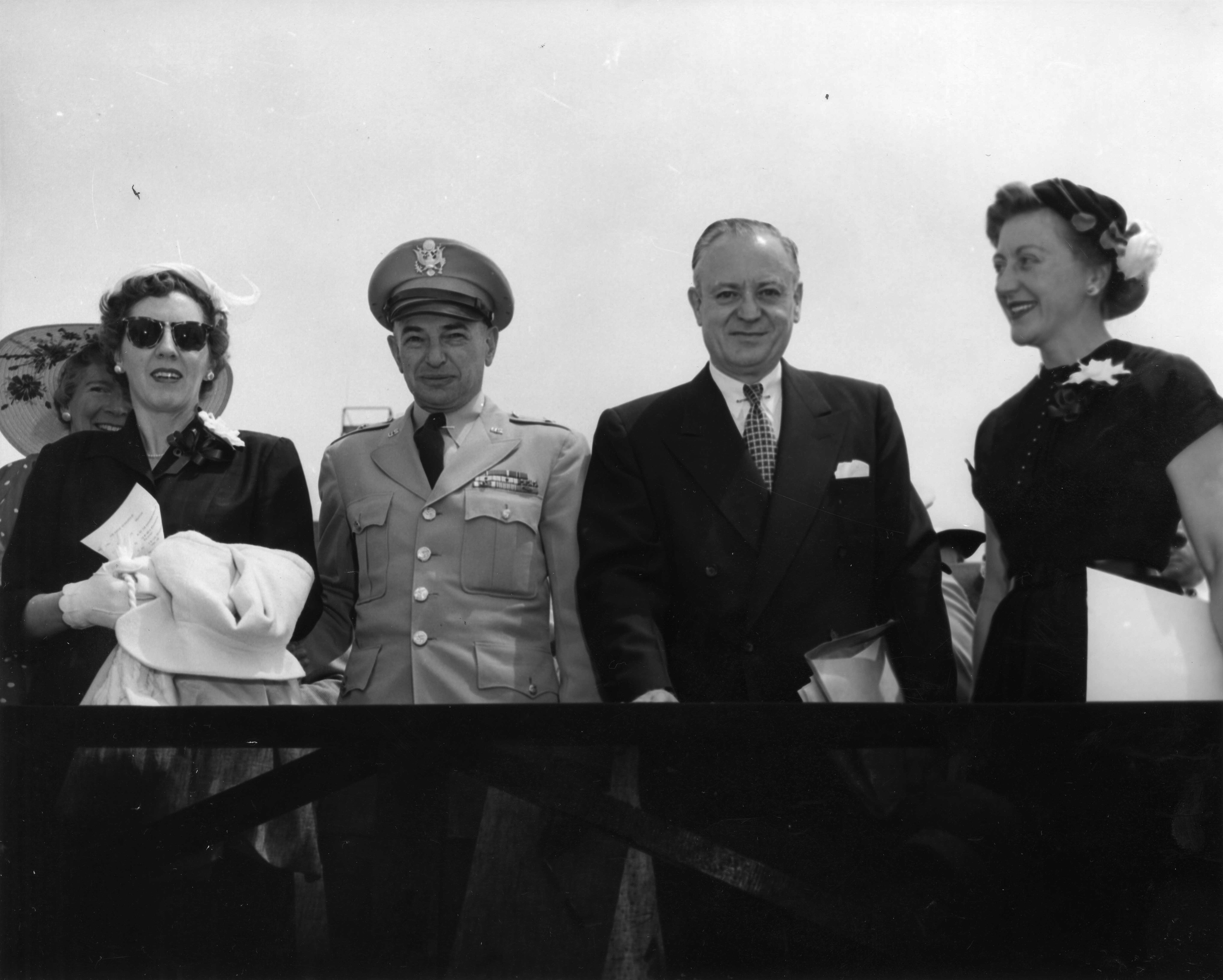
Brigadier General Robert J. Fleming with Senator Styles Bridges in 1956

Fleming was born at Fort Robinson in Nebraska on January 13, 1907, to Augusta and Robert John Fleming, an 1891 graduate of the United States Military Academy at West Point. As a military dependent, he attended three different high schools and graduated with honors at the age of fifteen. Fleming then studied at the Phillips Exeter Academy for two years before entering the U.S. Military Academy in July 1924. He graduated in June 1928 and was commissioned in the Corps of Engineers before earning a B.S. degree in mechanical engineering from the Massachusetts Institute of Technology in June 1931.

Fleming was assigned to the headquarters of the Hawaiian Department before and after the attack on Pearl Harbor, serving as staff engineer and special assistant to Lieutenant Generals Charles D. Herron, Walter C. Short and Delos C. Emmons. He remained in the United States Army as an engineering officer until 1954, his World War II service including duty in the Pacific Theater before a series of staff posts in Washington, D.C. and Virginia. Fleming graduated from the National War College in 1951. He was promoted to brigadier general in 1955 and major general in 1961.

After a period in public service that included a three-year sojourn in public service in France, Fleming was appointed by President John F. Kennedy as Governor of the Panama Canal Zone in 1962. His tenure in charge had also seen the most comprehensive survey of the canal with the intention of widening it, the inauguration of the Panama Canal Spillway newspaper and the opening of the Thatcher Ferry Bridge.

Fleming retired in February 1967 to take up a position as Executive Vice President for a company in Boston, Massachusetts.

Fleming died in Palo Alto, California on July 14, 1984. He was interred at Arlington National Cemetery beside his parents and wife.

== Awards and decorations ==
His years of military and public service came with several awards. He was decorated with the Distinguished Service Medal, the Legion of Merit, the Bronze Star, the Army Commendation Medal, the Order of the Patriotic War Second Class from the USSR, the Order of the White Lion from Czechoslovakia, the Légion d'honneur from France and the Order of Grand Cross, Condecoration Vasco Nuñez de Balboa from Panama for his various and varied public services.

Preceded by William Arnold Carter	Governor of Panama Canal Zone; 1962–1967	Succeeded by Walter Philip Leber
