= List of governors of the Panama Canal Zone =

Governor of the Panama Canal Zone
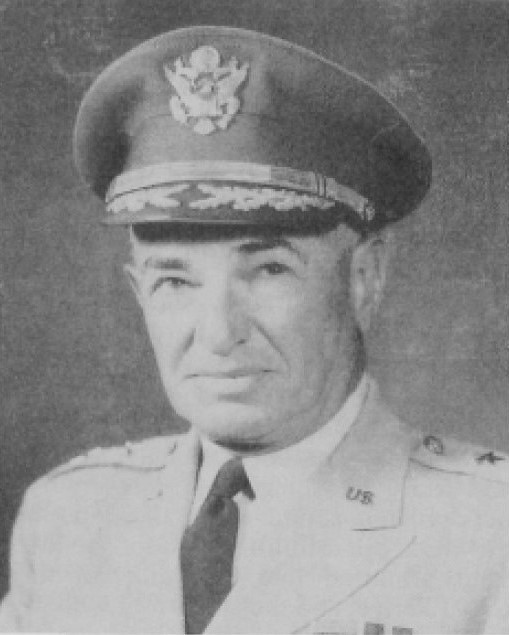
- Longest serving Robert John Fleming; 1 February 1962–31 January 1967
- Panama Canal Zone
- Seat: Balboa
- Appointer: The U.S. President
- Constituting instrument: Hay–Bunau-Varilla Treaty
- Formation: 14 May 1904; 122 years ago
- First holder: George Whitefield Davis
- Final holder: Harold Parfitt
- Abolished: 30 September 1979; 47 years ago

This article lists the governors of the Panama Canal Zone between 1904 and 1979, while the territory was under U.S. control.

== Military governors (1904–1914) ==
Image	Name (Birth–Death)	Took office	Left office	Notes	Reference
	George Whitefield Davis (1839–1918)	14 May 1904	24 May 1905		
	Charles Edward Magoon (1861–1920)	25 May 1905	12 October 1906		
	Richard Reid Rogers (1867–1949)	19 November 1906	31 March 1907	General Counsel of the Isthmian Canal Commission	
	Joseph Clay Stiles Blackburn (1838–1918)	1 April 1907	4 December 1909		
	Maurice Thatcher (1870–1973)	13 May 1910	8 August 1913		
	Richard Lee Metcalfe (1861–1954)	9 August 1913	31 March 1914		

== Military and civil governors (1914–1924) ==
Image	Name (Birth–Death)	Took office	Left office	Notes	Reference
	George Washington Goethals (1858–1928)	1 April 1914	10 January 1917	First U.S. civil governor appointed by President Woodrow Wilson	
	Chester Harding (1866–1936)	11 January 1917	27 March 1921		
	Jay Johnson Morrow (1870–1937)	28 March 1921	15 October 1924		

== Civil governors (1924–1979) ==
Image	Name (Birth–Death)	Took office	Left office	Notes	Reference
	Meriwether Lewis Walker (1869–1947)	16 October 1924	15 October 1928		
	Harry Burgess (1872–1933)	16 October 1928	20 October 1932		
	Julian Larcombe Schley (1880–1965)	21 October 1932	26 August 1936		
	Clarence S. Ridley (1883–1969)	27 August 1936	10 July 1940		
	Glen Edgar Edgerton (1887–1976)	11 July 1940	15 May 1944		
	Joseph Cowles Mehaffey (1889–1963)	16 May 1944	19 May 1948		
	Francis K. Newcomer (1889–1967)	20 May 1948	26 May 1952		
	John States Seybold (1897–1982)	27 May 1952	27 May 1956		
	William Everett Potter (1905–1988)	28 May 1956	30 June 1960		
	William Arnold Carter (1907–1996)	1 July 1960	31 January 1962		
	Robert John Fleming (1907–1984)	1 February 1962	31 January 1967		
	Walter Philip Leber (1918–2009)	21 February 1967	2 March 1971		
	David Stuart Parker (1919–1990)	3 March 1971	25 March 1975		
	Harold Parfitt (1921–2006)	26 March 1975	30 September 1979		

== See also ==
- History of the Panama Canal
