= Eugene Reybold =

American military engineer (1884–1961)

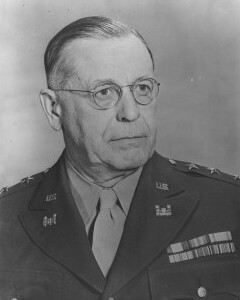
- Lieutenant General Eugene Reybold
- Born: February 13, 1884; Delaware City, Delaware, U.S.
- Died: November 21, 1961 (aged 77); Washington, D.C., U.S.
- Military career
- Allegiance: United States
- Branch: United States Army
- Service years: 1908–1946
- Rank: Lieutenant General
- Commands: Chief of Engineers (1941–1945)
- Conflicts: World War I World War II
- Awards: Distinguished Service Medal (2)

Eugene Reybold (February 13, 1884 – November 21, 1961) was distinguished as the World War II Chief of Engineers who directed the largest United States Army Corps of Engineers in the nation's history.

Reybold was born in Delaware City, Delaware. He graduated from Delaware College in 1903. Commissioned in the Coast Artillery Corps in 1908, Reybold was assigned to military housing and coast defense construction work. Stationed at Fort Monroe throughout World War I, he became commandant of the Coast Artillery School in 1919. He then transferred to the Corps of Engineers in 1926 and served as District Engineer in Buffalo, New York; Wilmington, North Carolina; and Memphis, Tennessee. In the last assignment he successfully battled record Mississippi River flood crests. He was appointed Southwestern Division Engineer (1937–40) and War Department Assistant Chief of Staff, G-4 (1940–41). Appointed Chief of Engineers shortly before Pearl Harbor, General Reybold directed the Corps' tremendous range of activities throughout the war and became the first Army officer ever to attain the rank of Lieutenant General while serving in the position of Chief of Engineers.

General Reybold retired on January 31, 1946, and died November 21, 1961, in Washington, D.C. He was awarded a Distinguished Service Medal with Oak Leaf Cluster.

Military offices
Preceded by Julian Larcombe Schley	Chief of Engineers; 1941—1945	Succeeded by Raymond A. Wheeler
