= William Arnold Carter =

American politician (1907–1996)

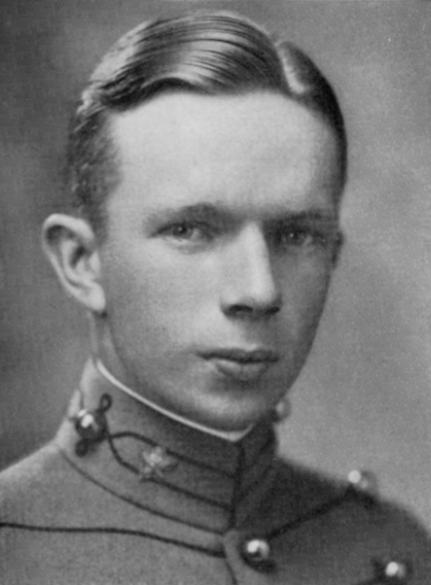
- As a West Point cadet

13th Governor of the Panama Canal Zone
- In office 1960–1962
- Preceded by: William Everett Potter
- Succeeded by: Robert John Fleming

Personal details
- Born: June 27, 1907 Corsicana, Texas, U.S.
- Died: May 18, 1996 (aged 88) Washington, D.C., U.S.
- Education: United States Military Academy; University of California (BS)

William Arnold Carter (June 27, 1907 – May 18, 1996) was an American politician who served as the Governor of the Panama Canal Zone from 1960 to 1962.

== Biography ==
He was born in Corsicana, Texas, on June 27, 1907, to William Arnold Carter and Susan Young.

He graduated from the United States Military Academy at West Point in 1930. In 1933 he earned a B.S. in civil engineering from the University of California. His World War II service included being chief engineer of the II Corps in the Mediterranean, and chief engineer of the 1st Army during the Normandy Invasion and European Campaign. He served as Panama Canal Zone Governor from 1960 to 1962.

He died on May 18, 1996, in Washington, D.C.

Preceded by William E. Potter	Governor of Panama Canal Zone; 1960–1962	Succeeded by Robert John Fleming
