= Richard Reid Rogers =

American transit lawyer

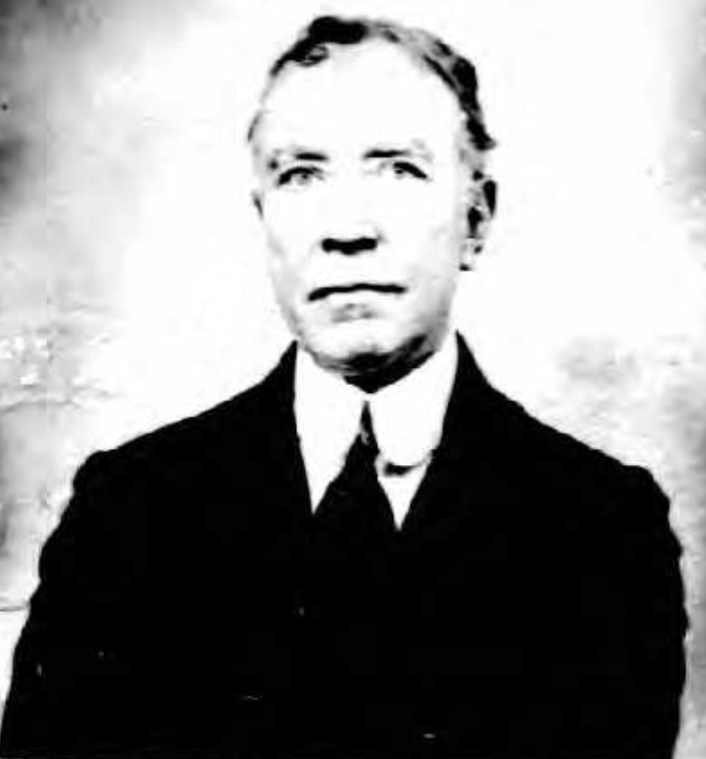
- Rogers in 1924

3rd Military Governor of the Panama Canal Zone
- In office 19 November 1906 – 31 March 1907
- Appointed by: Theodore Roosevelt
- Preceded by: Charles Edward Magoon
- Succeeded by: Joseph Clay Styles Blackburn

Personal details
- Born: December 4, 1867 Bourbon County, Kentucky, U.S.
- Died: November 10, 1949 (aged 81) Manhattan, New York, U.S.
- Spouse: Sarah Eunice Tomlin (m. 1891; died 1945)
- Relations: John Jameson (grandfather)
- Parent(s): Benjamin F. Rogers; Elizabeth H. Jameson
- Education: Princeton University; University of Virginia

Richard Reid Rogers (December 4, 1867 – November 10, 1949) was a prominent United States lawyer, specializing in transit law.

== Early life ==
He was born on December 4, 1867, in Bourbon County, Kentucky, to Benjamin F. Rogers and Elizabeth H. (née Jameson) Rogers. After his father's unexpected death, his mother remarried to Judge Richard Reid. His maternal grandfather was U.S. Representative from Missouri, John Jameson.

Rogers graduated in 1886 from Princeton University before studying law at the University of Virginia.

== Career ==
He began his career in New York City with Guthrie, Cravath, & Henderson, before serving as the general counsel to both the Isthmian Canal Commission and later the Panama Railroad Company. He subsequently was counsel to the Metropolitan Street Railway and several of its successor companies.

On June 20, 1906, Rogers was appointed as general counsel to the Isthmian Canal Commission, to replace outgoing Governor Charles Edward Magoon. In November of that year, President Theodore Roosevelt temporarily abolished the office of Governor of the Panama Canal Zone, to give greater autonomy to the chief engineer of the canal project. This order placed all of the duties of the Governor on the general counsel, in effect making Rogers the Governor in all but title (though he was not required to govern from the Canal Zone itself and he remained in Washington, D.C.).

== Personal life ==
On June 25, 1891, Rogers was married to Sarah Eunice Tomlin (1867–1945) in Madison, Tennessee. They were the parents of one daughter:

- Elizabeth Reid Rogers (1893–1957), who married into the German nobility and the House of Hesse, by marrying Prince Christian of Hesse-Philippsthal-Barchfeld, a son of Prince William, in 1915 and being titled Baroness von Barchfeld.

He died on November 10, 1949, at the University Club in New York City. He was buried at the Machpelah Cemetery in Mount Sterling, Kentucky.

=== Descendants ===
Through his daughter Elizabeth, he was a grandfather of four: Elisabeth Auguste (1915–2003), Richard Christian (1917–1985), Waldemar (1919–2002) and Marie Louise Olga (1921–1999), who were permitted to title themselves Prinz/Prinzessin von Hessen (Prince/Princess of Hesse).

Political offices
Preceded by Charles Edward Magoon	Military Governor of the Panama Canal Zone; 1906–1907	Succeeded by Joseph Clay Styles Blackburn
