= William Lindsay (Kentucky politician) =

American politician (1835–1909)

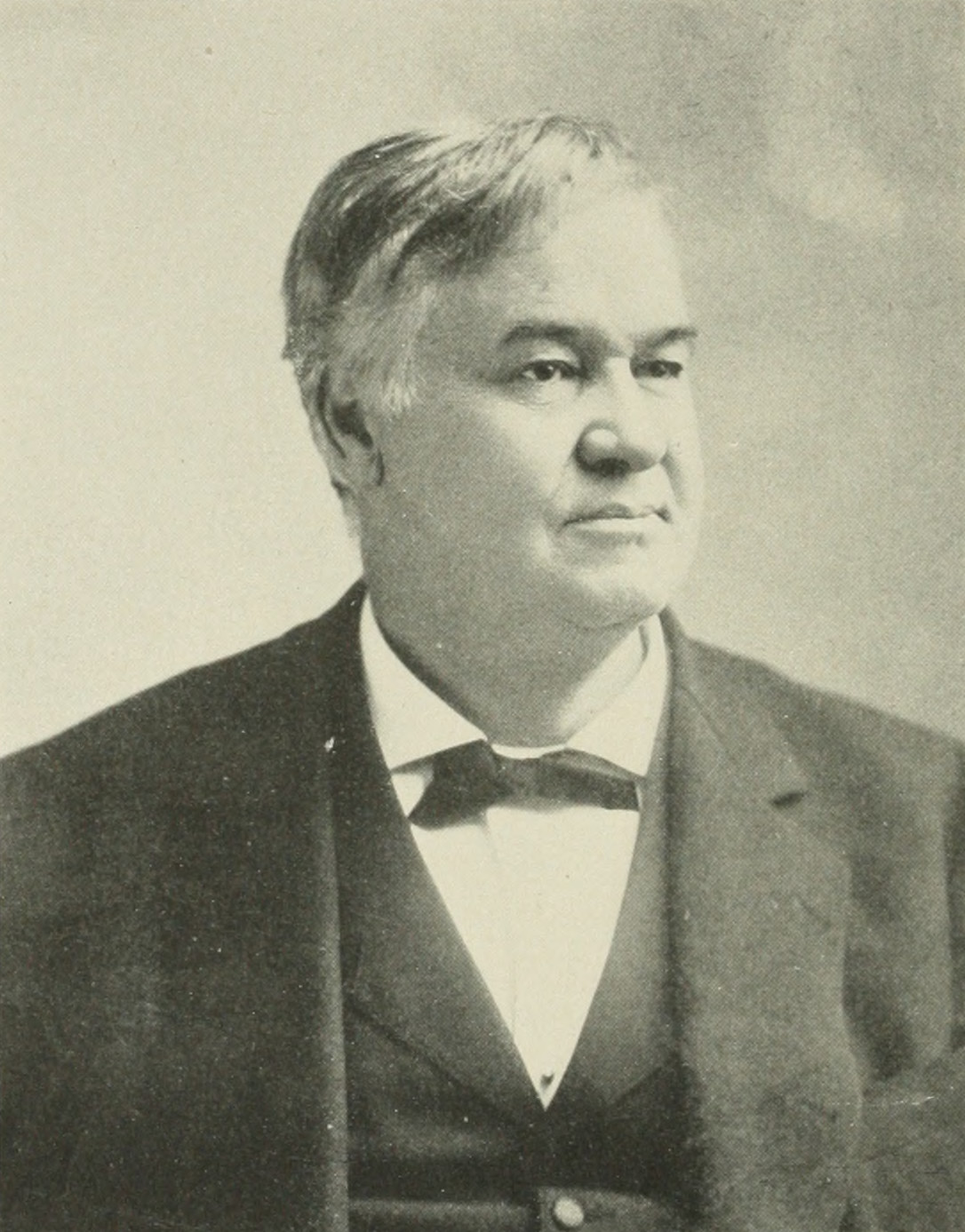
- Lindsay, c. 1899

United States Senator from Kentucky
- In office February 15, 1893 – March 4, 1901
- Preceded by: John G. Carlisle
- Succeeded by: Joseph C.S. Blackburn

Member of the Kentucky Senate
- In office August 5, 1889 – February 9, 1893
- Preceded by: L. W. McKee
- Succeeded by: Edmund H. Taylor Jr.
- Constituency: 20th district
- In office August 5, 1867 – June 1870
- Preceded by: J. D. Landrum
- Succeeded by: Henry A. Tyler
- Constituency: 1st district

Chief Justice of the Kentucky Court of Appeals
- In office 1876–1878
- Preceded by: Belvard J. Peters
- Succeeded by: William S. Pryor

Justice of the Kentucky Court of Appeals
- In office 1870–1878
- Preceded by: Rufas K. Williams
- Succeeded by: Thomas Hines

Personal details
- Born: September 4, 1835 Lexington, Virginia, US
- Died: October 15, 1909 (aged 74) Frankfort, Kentucky, US
- Resting place: Frankfort Cemetery
- Party: Democratic

William Lindsay (September 4, 1835 – October 15, 1909) was an American politician. He served as a Democratic U.S. senator from Kentucky from 1893 to 1901.

== Biography ==
Born near Lexington, Virginia, Lindsay attended the common schools and settled in Clinton, Kentucky in 1854. There he taught school and studied law. He was admitted to the bar and commenced practice in Clinton in 1858. During the American Civil War, Lindsay served in the infantry in the Confederate States Army from July 1861 until May 1865, rising to the rank of captain, and serving on the staffs of General Buford and General Lyon. He was released as prisoner of war in 1865 and returned to Clinton to practice law.

Linsay was a member of the Kentucky Senate from 1867 to 1870 during which he supported women's suffrage in the Assembly. He served as judge of the Kentucky Court of Appeals from 1870 to 1878, and served as chief justice of the court from 1876 to 1878. He then resumed the practice of law in Frankfort, Kentucky. He again joined the Kentucky Senate, serving from 1889 to 1893. He then served as United States Commissioner to the World's Columbian Exposition, held at Chicago, Illinois, in 1893.

Lindsay was elected to the United States Senate to fill the vacancy created by the resignation of John G. Carlisle. He was reelected, and served in total from February 15, 1893, until March 3, 1901, and chaired the Committee on Indian Depredations and the Committee on Revolutionary Claims. He was not a candidate for renomination in 1900, but instead moved to New York City and practiced law. He was appointed United States Commissioner to the Louisiana Purchase Exposition at St. Louis, Missouri, in 1901. He died in Frankfort, and was interred in the State Cemetery.

U.S. Senate
| Preceded by John G. Carlisle | U.S. senator (Class 2) from Kentucky; 1893–1901; Served alongside: Joseph C. S. Blackburn, William J. Deboe | Succeeded by Joseph C. S. Blackburn |
