= De Fleury Medal =

United States Army award

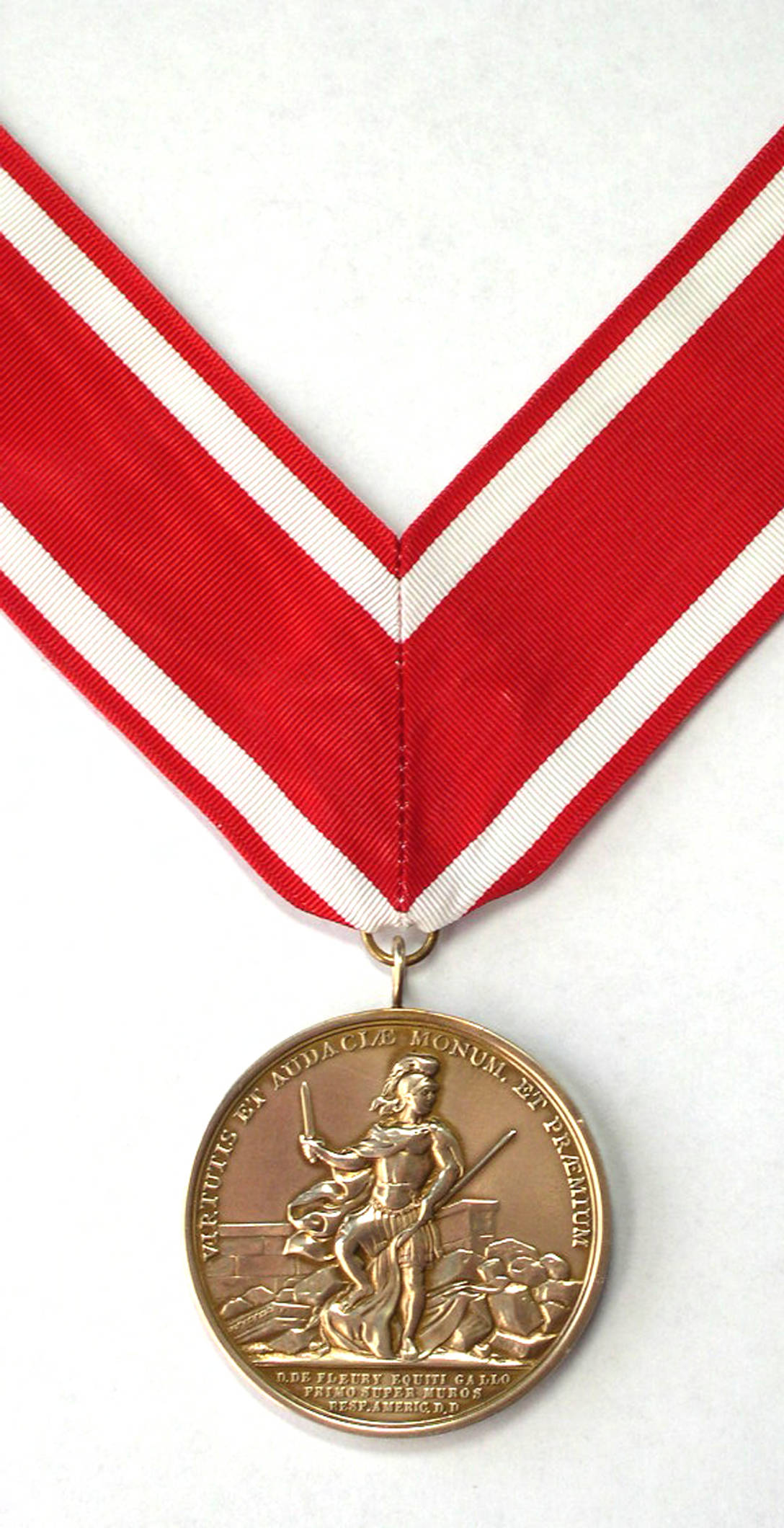

The De Fleury Medal, an award of the US Army Engineer Association, was named in honor of François-Louis Teissèdre de Fleury, a French Engineer in the Continental Army.

In the late 1980s, as the Corps of Engineers implemented the U.S. Army Regimental System, the senior Engineer leadership sought a method for the Corps to honor those individuals who have provided significant contributions to Army Engineering.

The Army Regimental System was developed to emphasize the history, customs, and traditions of the Corps; so MG Daniel R. Schroeder, then Commanding General of Fort Leonard Wood and US Army Engineer School Commandant, wanted an award that would tie in with the beginnings of the nation and the Army Corps of Engineers.

The Engineer Regiment adopted the de Fleury Medal as an award because of the values demonstrated by the man for whom it was struck – values of special meaning to Engineer Soldiers. When the first de Fleury medal was awarded in 1989, it became the first Congressional medal struck, though not the first Congressional medal authorized.

== Medal description ==
On the obverse of the medal is a Latin inscription meaning: "A MEMORIAL AND REWARD FOR COURAGE AND BOLDNESS". In the center appears the image of a helmeted soldier standing amidst the ruins of a fort, holding in his right hand an unsheathed sword, and in his left the staff of the enemy's flag, which he tramples underfoot.

On the reverse, again in Latin: "FORTIFICATIONS, MARSHES, ENEMIES OVERCOME". In the center the fortress at Stony Point is depicted with both turrets and a flag flying. At the base of the hill are two shore batteries, one of which is firing at one of six vessels on the Hudson River. Beneath the fort is the legend: "STONY POINT CARRIED BY STORM, JULY 15, 1779".

== Levels of de Fleury Medals ==
The Engineer Regiment makes four award levels of the de Fleury Medal.

- The STEEL Medal may be presented to an individual whose selfless service provided to the Engineer Regiment as it supports the Army to assure mobility, enhance protection, enable expeditionary logistics, and build capacity in order to provide commanders with the freedom of action needed to win full spectrum operations in an era of persistent conflict.
- The BRONZE Medal may be presented to an individual who has rendered significant service or support to an element of the Engineer Regiment.
- The SILVER Medal may only be awarded to an individual who has rendered outstanding and significant support or service to the Engineer Regiment.
- The United States Army Chief of Engineers awards only one GOLD medal each year to an individual who exemplifies boldness, courage, and commitment to a strong national defense.

Presentation of the de Fleury Medal, to those individuals meeting established criteria, was started by the Engineer Regiment as the move of the Engineer School from Fort Belvoir, Virginia to Fort Leonard Wood, Missouri was completed in 1989. The gold medal presentation is the highlight of the annual Engineer Regimental Dinner held at Fort Leonard Wood each spring.

== Gold Medal recipients ==
1989 – John O. Marsh, Jr. Secretary of the Army

1990 – Robert W. Page Assistant Secretary of the Army for Civil Works

1991 – GEN Maxwell R. Thurman, USA Retired

1992 – GEN Andrew J. Goodpaster, USA Retired

1993 – LTG Emerson C. Itschner, USA Retired

1994 – Mr. John B. Mahaffey Civilian Aide to the Secretary of the Army

1995 – LTG Frederick J. Clarke, USA Retired

1996 – SMA Leon L. Van Autreve, USA Retired

1997 – LTG John W. Morris, USA Retired

1998 – Mr. Allen M. Carton

1999 – Ike Skelton Congressman, State of Missouri

2000 – LTG Julius W. Becton, Jr., USA Retired and CSM Robert W. Elkey, (Posthumous)

2001 – LTG Max W. Noah, USA Retired and COL Claude L. Roberts, Jr., (Posthumous)

2002 – MG Richard S. Kem, USA Retired

2003 – Daniel K. Inouye Senator, State of Hawaii

2004 – COL Edward C. Gibson, USA Retired

2005 – LTG Daniel R. Schroeder, USA Retired

2006 – MG John G. Waggener, USA Retired and SFC Paul Ray Smith (Posthumous)

2007 – LTG Elvin R. "Vald" Heiberg III, USA Retired

2008 – LTG Robert B. Flowers, USA Retired

2009 – LTG Henry J. Hatch and Kisuk (Charlie) Cheung (Posthumous)

2010 – Dr Lewis E. Link, PhD

2011 – COL Carl F. Baswell, USA Retired and GEN Eric Shinseki, USA Retired

2012 – GEN David H. Petraeus, USA Retired and COL John M. Morgan, USA Retired

2013 – The Honorable Robert M. Gates and CSM Julius Nutter, USA Retired

2014 – MG Merdith W.B. "Bo" Temple, USA Retired and Frank M. Weinberg

2015 – BG Gerry Galloway, PhD, USA Retired and LTG Robert L. Van Antwerp, Jr., USA Retired

2016 – Robert K. Dawson and MG Harold J. Greene (Posthumous)

2017 – CSM (Ret) Robert Winzenried, 9th CSM of the Corps of Engineers and the Honorable Rodney Frelinghuysen, Representative of the State of New Jersey

2018 – MG (Ret) Clair Gill, Fort Leonard Wood CDR and The Honorable Trent Kelly, Representative of the State of Mississippi

2019 – COL (Ret) James Rowan, Deputy CMDT USAES and GEN (Ret) Frank Grass, 27th Chief of National Guard

2020 – The Honorable Grace F. Napolitano, Representative of the State of California

2021 – Lt. Gen (Ret.) Todd T. Semonite, the 54th Chief of Engineers

2022 - The Honorable Marcy Kaptur, Representative of the State of Ohio

2023 – Tom Carper Senator, State of Delaware

2023 – Lt. Gen (Ret.) Jeffery W. Talley, 32nd Chief of Army Reserve

2024 – SFC Christopher A. Celiz (Posthumous)

2024 - The Honorable Michael L. Connor, Assistant Secretary of the Army for Civil Works

2025 - Lt. Gen. (Ret.) Thomas P. Bostick, the 53rd Chief of Engineers

2026 - Lt. Gen. (Ret.) Leslie R. Groves, Commander - Armed Forces Special Weapons Manhattan Project
