= United States Army Engineer School =

U.S. Army school for training in various engineering skills

United States Army Engineer School (USAES)
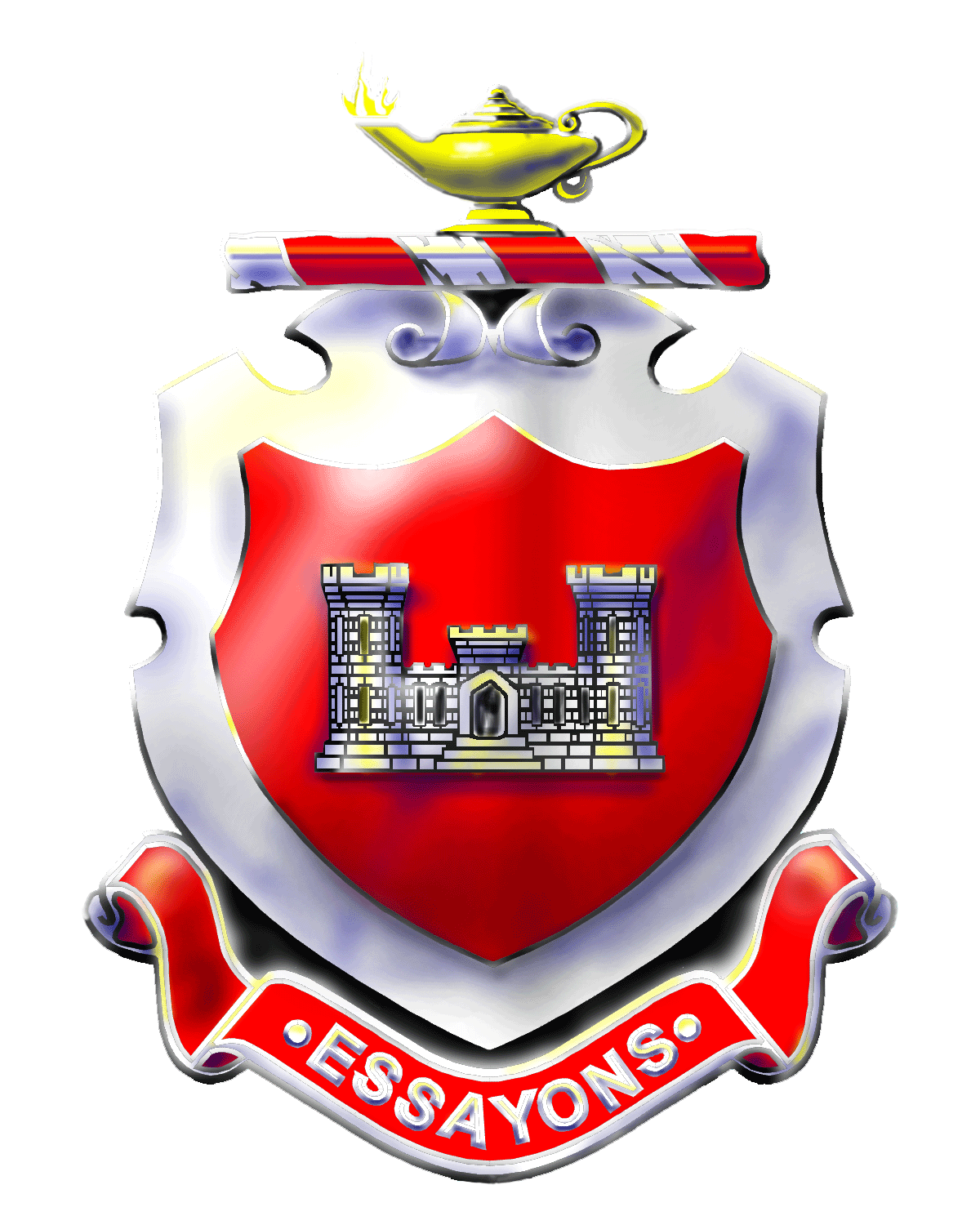
- Active: 1778 – present
- Country: United States
- Allegiance: United States Army
- Branch: Regular Army
- Type: Training school
- Role: Generate military engineer capabilities for the U.S. Army
- Part of: United States Army Combined Arms Command
- Garrison/HQ: Fort Leonard Wood
- Motto: Essayons (Let Us Try)
- Colors: Scarlet and White

Commanders
- Commandant: Colonel Robert Newbauer
- Command Sergeant Major: CSM David Palmer

Insignia
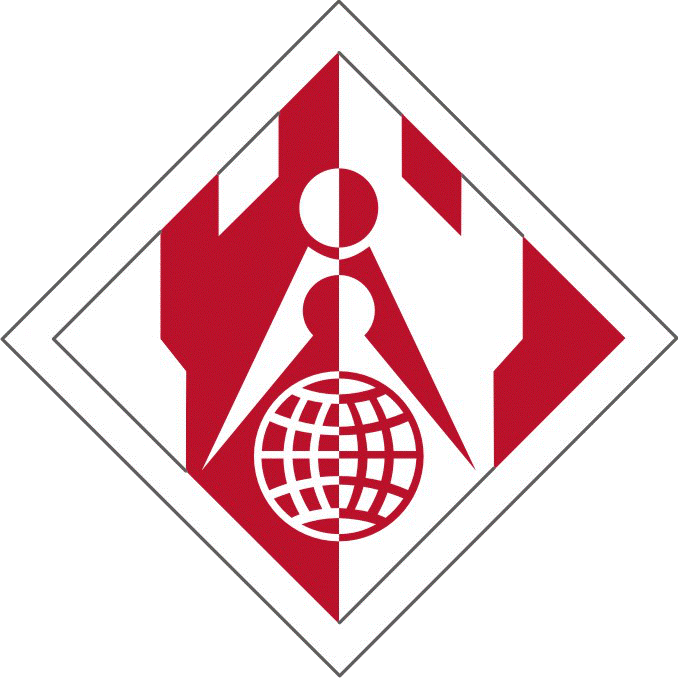
- US Army Corps of Engineers

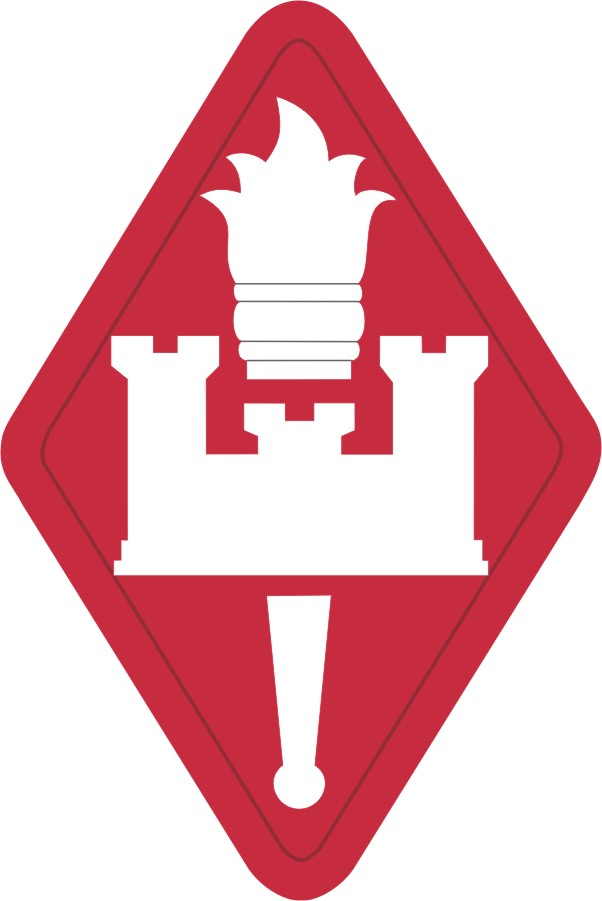
- U.S. Army Engineer Center and Fort Leonard Wood SSI (Old)

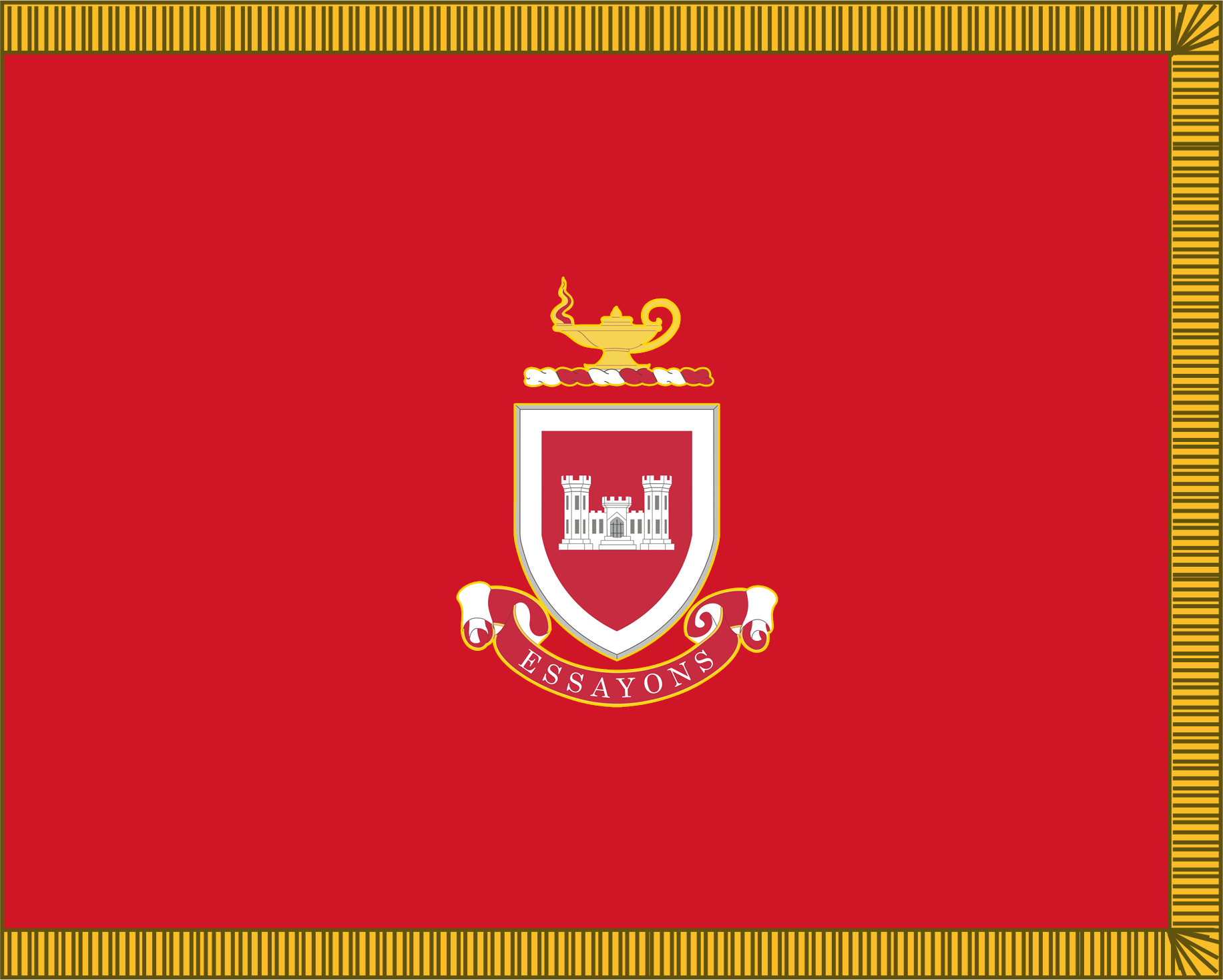
- United States Army Engineer School Flag

The United States Army Engineer School (USAES) is located at Fort Leonard Wood, Missouri. It was founded as a School of Engineering by General Headquarters Orders, Valley Forge on 9 June 1778. The U.S. Army Engineer School provides training that develops a wide variety of engineering skills including: combat engineer, bridging, construction, geospatial, topography, diving, and firefighting.

USAES defines its mission as:

Synchronize and integrate the Doctrine, Organization, Training, Material, Leader Development, Personnel, and Facilities (DOTMLPF) domains to ensure the Engineer Regiment is prepared to provide engineer support now and into the future.

== History ==
As with the United States Army Corps of Engineers, the Engineer School traces its roots to the American Revolution. General Headquarters Orders, Valley Forge, dated 9 June 1778 read "3 Captains and 9 Lieutenants are wanted to officer the Company of Sappers. As the Corps will be a SCHOOL OF ENGINEERING, it opens a prospect to such gentlemen as enter it...." Shortly after the publishing of the order, the "school" moved to the river fortifications at West Point. With the end of the war and the mustering out of the Army, the school closed. However, the Regiment of Artillerists and Engineers was constituted a military school and was reopened at the same location in 1794. For four years it constituted a school of application for new engineers and artillerymen. Closing in 1798, due to a fire which destroyed many facilities, the engineers were without a school for three years.

In 1801, the War Department revived the school, and Major Jonathan Williams became its superintendent. Less than a year later, Congress authorized the Corps of Engineers and constituted it at West Point as a military academy. For the next 64 years, the Military Academy was under the supervision of the Corps. Although the curriculum was heavily laced with engineering subjects, the Academy commissioned officers into all branches of the service. Following the American Civil War (1861–1865), supervision of the Academy passed to the War Department.

When the Engineer Battalion took station at the Fort at Willets Point (later renamed Fort Totten) in 1866, Engineer leaders saw the opportunity to develop a school oriented exclusively to engineers. From 1868 to 1885, an informal School of Application existed; its first commander was Major Henry Larcom Abbot, who developed the Army's first modern underwater minefield system there. Part of this effort involved the creation of the Essayons Club. This was an informal group which met during the winter months and presented professional engineer papers. In 1885, the School of Application received formal recognition by the War Department. In 1890, the name was changed to United States Engineer School.

In 1901, the School moved from Willets Point to Washington Barracks in Washington, D.C., and was renamed the Engineer School of Application. This name lasted only a few years. In 1904, the name was changed back to the Engineer School. The Engineer School remained at Washington Barracks for the next 19 years, although it closed from time to time because of a shortage of officers, or national emergencies. In 1909, certain courses associated with the field army moved to Ft. Leavenworth, and the Army Field Engineer School opened in 1910. That school, a part of the Army Service Schools, closed in 1916. The First World War forced a closing of the Engineer School as the instructors and students were needed to officer the expanding engineer force. The school resumed its instruction in 1920, but at a different location. Washington Barracks was transferred to the General Staff College and the Engineer School moved to Camp A. A. Humphreys, south of Mount Vernon, in Virginia. This was a World War I camp built on land acquired by the War Department in 1912. The original name for the tract was Belvoir. In 1935, Camp Humphreys was renamed Fort Belvoir.

After 68 years, in 1988, the home of the Engineer School was moved to Fort Leonard Wood, Missouri "due to a shortage of land for training at Fort Belvoir" The move also allowed engineer training of officers, warrant officers and enlisted to be conducted in the same location.

== USAES and Engineer Regiment symbology. ==
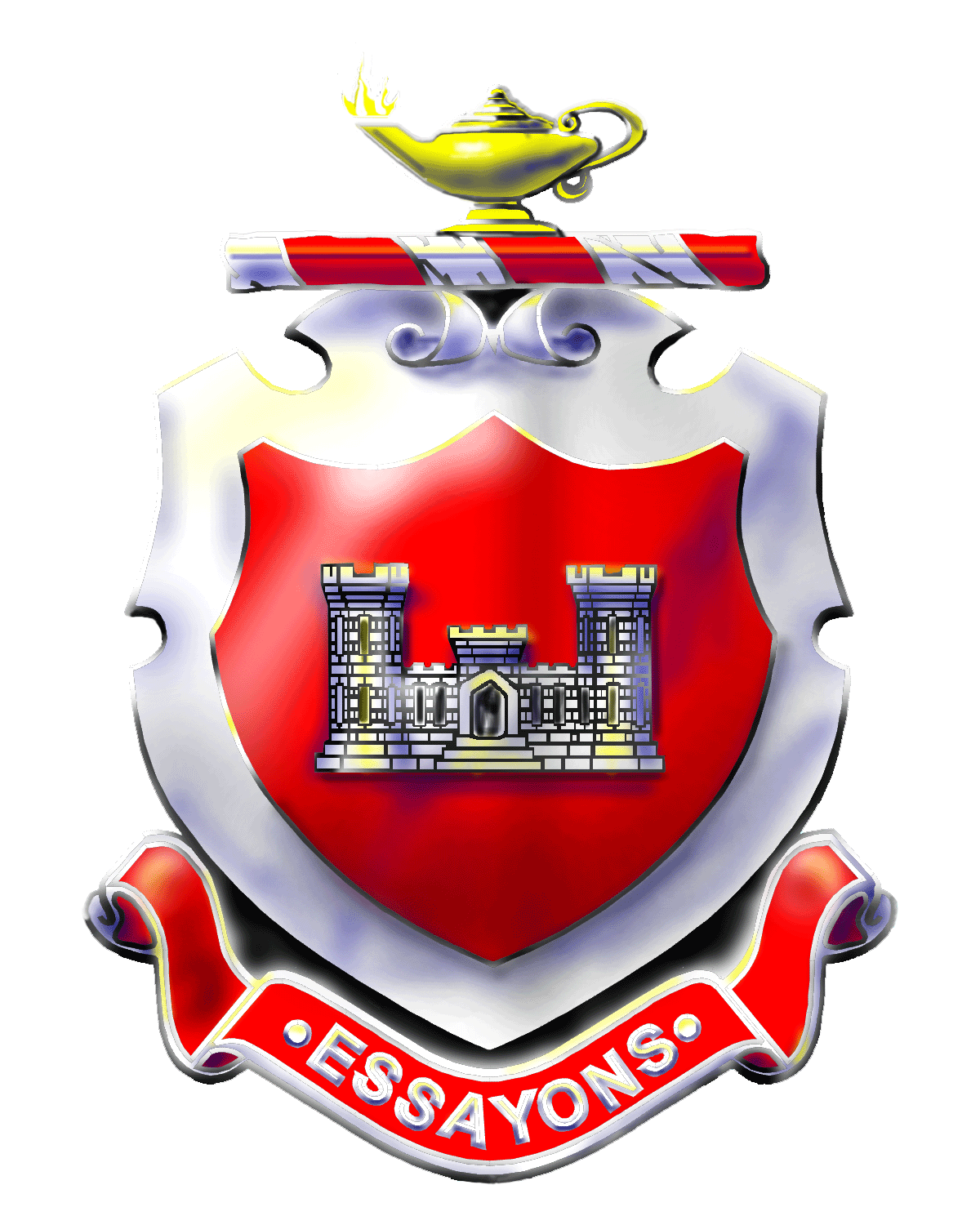

The distinctive insignia for the U.S. Army Engineer School was approved by the War Department on June 27, 1929. It had been used on diplomas and stationery since 1924. Scarlet and white are the colors of the Engineers. Scarlet represents the shared heritage with the Artillery. From 1794 to 1802, the Engineers were part of the Corps of Artillerists and Engineers. White is the traditional color of the Infantry. Its use on the shield reflects the Engineers’ secondary mission of fighting as infantry. Above the shield is the “Lamp of Knowledge”. The lamps represents the Engineer Schools mission to train and educate.

Under the shield is the motto of the Engineers-Essayons. It is a French term which means “Let us strive”, “Let us try”. The use of this term reflects the contributions of French Engineers to the Nation’s struggle for independence and the influence of the French Engineers on the early development of the Corps.

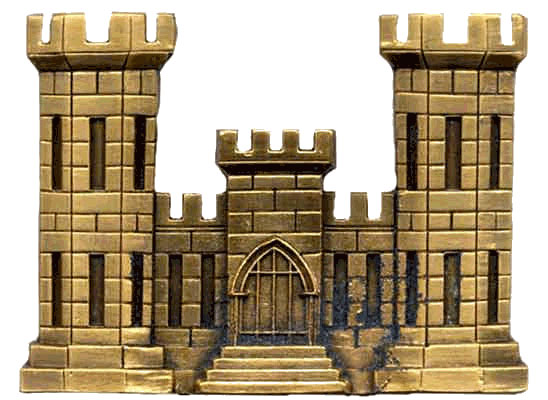

The castle symbolizes the classical role of Engineers as those who build fortifications and those who breach their walls. The castle has been used by the Corps since 1840, when it was adopted as a device on the uniform of the Cadets of the United States Military Academy.

== Organization ==
The U.S. Army Engineer School is composed of Headquarters staff, the Directorate of Training and Leader Development, the Directorate Of Environmental Protection and Management, 1st Engineer Brigade, the Counter Explosive Hazards Center and the Engineer Personnel Development Office.

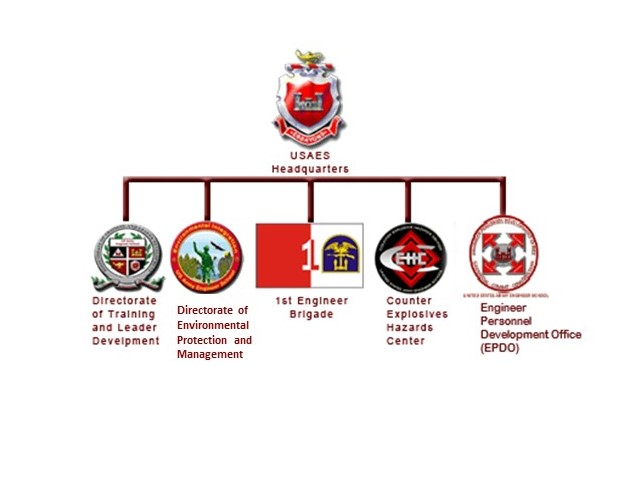
Visual representation of the U.S. Army Engineer School structure

== Command ==
As of 2025, the Commandant of the U.S. Army Engineer School is Colonel Timothy Hudson. The Regimental Command Sergeant Major is CSM David Palmer. The Regimental Chief Warrant Officer is CW5 Willie Gadsden Jr.

== Commandants ==
| Image | Name | Period of Office |
|---|---|---|
| | Colonel Jonathan Williams | 1802–1812 |
| | Brigadier General Joseph Gardner Swift | 1812–1817 |
| | Brigadier General Sylvanus Thayer | 1817–1833 |
| | Brigadier General Rene' E. De Russy | 1833–1838 |
| | Major General Richard Delafield | 1838–1845 & 1856–1861 |
| | Brigadier General Henry Brewerton | 1845–1852 |
| | Colonel Robert Edward Lee | 1852–1855 |
| | Major General John G. Barnard | 1855–1856 |
| | Captain Pierre G. T. Beauregard | 1861 |
| | Lieutenant Colonel Alexander H. Bowman | 1861–1864 |
| | Major General Zealous B. Tower | 1864 |
| | Brigadier General George Washington Cullum | 1864–1866 |
| | Major James C. Duane | 1866–1868 |
| | Major Henry Larcom Abbot | 1868–1886 |
| | Major Cyrus B. Comstock | 1886–1887 |
| | Major William R. King | 1887–1895 |
| | Major William T. Rossell | 1895 |
| | Major John G. D. Knight | 1895–1901 |
| | Major William Murray Black | 1901–1903 |
| | Major Edward Burr | 1903–1906 |
| | Major Eben Eveleth Winslow | 1906–1907 |
| | Major William Campbell Langfitt | 1907–1910 |
| | Major William Jones Barden | 1910–1913 |
| | Major Joseph E. Kuhn | 1913–1914 |
| | Major William Preston Wooten | 1914–1916 |
| | Major Gustave Rudolph Lukesh | 1916 |
| | Major General Mason Mathews Patrick | 1916–1917 & 1921 |
| | Colonel William Wright Harts | 1917 |
| | Colonel Henry Jervey | 1917 |
| | Colonel Frederic Vaughan Abbot | 1917–1918 |
| | Colonel Richard Park | 1918 |
| | Brigadier General Charles Willauer Kutz | 1918 |
| | Colonel Jay Johnson Morrow | 1919 |
| | Major General Clement A. F. Flagler | 1919–1920 |
| | Brigadier General William Durward Connor | 1920 |
| | Colonel Meriwether Lewis Walker | 1920–1921 |
| | Major General Mason Patrick | 1921 |
| | Colonel James Albert Woodruff | 1921–1924 |
| | Colonel Harry Burgess | 1924 |
| | Colonel Sherwood Alfred Cheney | 1924–1925 |
| | Colonel Edward Murphy Markham | 1925–1929 |
| | Colonel Edward Hugh Schulz | 1929–1933 |
| | Colonel George Redfield Spalding | 1933–1935 |
| | Colonel Laurance V. Frazier | 1935–1936 |
| | Colonel Julian Larcombe Schley | 1936–1937 |
| | Colonel Thomas M. Robins | 1938–1939 |
| | Colonel James Alexander O'Connor | 1939–1940 |
| | Brigadier General Roscoe Campbell Crawford | 1940–1943 |
| | Colonel Xenophon Herbert Price | 1943–1944 |
| | Brigadier General Edwin H. Marks | 1944 |
| | Brigadier General Gordon Russell Young | 1944 |
| | Brigadier General Dwight Frederick Johns | 1944–1945 |
| | Brigadier General Patrick Henry Timothy Jr. | 1936–1937 |
| | Major General Francis B. Wilby | 1945–1946 |
| | Colonel Willis Edward Teale | 1946–1947 |
| | Major General William Morris Hoge Jr. | 1947–1948 |
| | Major General Douglas Lafayette Weart | 1948–1951 |
| | Major General Stanley Lonzo Scott | 1951 |
| | Major General Arthur W. Pence | 1951–1954 (Died in office) |
| | Major General Louis W. Prentiss | 1954–1956 |
| | Major General David H. Tulley | 1956–1958 |
| | Major General Gerald E. Galloway | 1958–1960 |
| | Major General Walter K. Wilson Jr. | 1960–1961 |
| | Major General Stephen R. Hanmer | 1961–1962 |
| | Major General Lawrence J. Lincoln | 1962–1963 |
| | Major General William F. Cassidy | 1963–1965 |
| | Major General Frederick J. Clarke | 1965–1966 |
| | Major General Robert F. Seedlock | 1966–1967 |
| | Major General Arthur W. Oberbeck | 1968 |
| | Major General George H. Walker | 1968–1969 |
| | Major General William C. Gribble Jr. | 1969–1970 |
| | Major General Robert R. Ploger | 1970–1973 |
| | Major General Harold R. Parfitt | 1973–1975 |
| | Major General James A. Johnson | 1975–1977 |
| | Major General James L. Kelly | 1977–1980 |
| | Major General Max W. Noah | 1980–1982 |
| | Major General James Neal Ellis | 1982–1984 |
| | Major General Richard S. Kem | 1984–1987 |
| | Major General William H. Reno | 1987–1988 |
| | Major General Daniel R. Schroeder | 1988–1991 |
| | Major General Daniel W. Christman | 1991–1993 |
| | Major General Joe N. Ballard | 1993–1995 |
| | Major General Clair F. Gill | 1995–1997 |
| | Major General Robert B. Flowers | 1997–2000 |
| | Major General Anders B. Aadland | 2000–2002 |
| | Major General Robert L. Van Antwerp Jr. | 2002–2004 |
| | Major General Randal Castro | 2004–2006 |
| | Major General William H. McCoy | 2006–2007 |
| | Brigadier General Gregg Martin | 2007–2008 |
| | Colonel Robert A. Tipton | 2008–2009 |
| | Brigadier General Bryan G. Watson | 2009–2011 |
| | Brigadier General Peter “Duke” DeLuca | 2011–2013 |
| | Brigadier General Anthony C. Funkhouser | 2013-2015 |
| | Brigadier General James H. Raymer | 2015 - 2017 |
| | Brigadier General Robert F. Whittle Jr. | 2017 - 2019 |
| | Brigadier General Mark Quander | 2019 - 2021 |
| | Colonel Daniel H. Hibner | 2021–2022 |
| | COLONEL JOSEPH C. “CLETE” GOETZ II | 2022-2024 |
| | COLONEL STEPHEN J. KOLOUCH | 2024-2025 |
| | COLONEL TIMOTHY P. HUDSON | 2025-2026 |

== Regimental Command Sergeants Major ==
| Image | Name | Period of Office |
|---|---|---|
| | SGM Frederick W. Gerber | 1867–1875 |
| | SGM A.M. Wagner | 1961–1962 |
| | SGM G.F. Humphreys | 1962–1964 |
| | SGM M.H. Philips | 1964–1966 |
| | SGM A.M. Wagner | Jan-Mar 1966 |
| | SGM M.H. Philips | 1966-1968 |
| | SGM Harry W. Dawson | Mar-Jul 1968 |
| | CSM Griffith A. Jones | 1968–1969 |
| | CSM M.H. Philips | 1969–1971 |
| | CSM H. Salazar | 1971–1973 |
| | CSM Adriano W. Benini | 1973–1975 |
| | CSM Robert G. Cady | 1975–1977 |
| | CSM Lucion L. Cowart | 1977–1979 |
| | CSM Frederick J. Eisenbart | 1979–1981 |
| | CSM Marvin L. Knowles | 1981–1982 |
| | CSM Orville W. Troesch Jr. | 1982–1984 |
| | CSM C.T. Tucker | 1984–1986 |
| | CSM M. Lee | 1986–1988 |
| | CSM Acie Gardner | 1986–1991 |
| | CSM W. E. Woodall | 1991–1992 |
| | CSM Richard N. Wilson | 1992–1993 |
| | CSM Roy L. Burns | 1993–1996 |
| | CSM Julius Nutter | 1996–1997 |
| | CSM Robert M. Dils | 1997–1999 |
| | CSM Arthur Laughlin | 1999–2000 |
| | CSM Robert R. Robinson II | 2000–2002 |
| | CSM William D. McDaniel Jr. | 2002–2003 |
| | CSM Clinton J. Pearson | 2003–2008 |
| | CSM Robert J. Wells | 2008–2011 |
| | CSM Terrence W. Murphy | 2011–2013 |
| | CSM Butler J. Kendrick Jr. | 2013 - 2015 |
| | CSM Bradley J. Houston | 2015 - 2017 |
| | CSM Trevor C. Walker | 2017 - 2018 |
| | CSM Douglas William Galick | 2019 - 2020 |
| | CSM John T. Brennan | 2020 - 2023 |
| | CSM Zachary Plummer | 2023 - 2025 |
| | CSM David D. Palmer | 2025 - Present |

== Regimental Chief Warrant Officers ==
| Image | Name | Period of Office |
|---|---|---|
| | CW5 Robert K. Lamphear | 2007–2011 |
| | CW5 Scott R. Owens | 2011 - 2015 |
| | CW5 John F. Fobish | 2015 - 2017 |
| | CW5 Jerome Bussey | 2017 - 2019 |
| | CW5 Dean A. Registe | 2019 - 2023 |
| | CW5 Willie Gadsden Jr. | 2023 - 2026 |
| | CW5 Jason R. Davis | 2026 - Present |

== Engineer ==
The school published Engineer (ISSN 0046-1989), a professional bulletin.

== See also ==
- U.S. Army Corps of Engineers
- Prime Power School
