= General Gill =

General Gill may refer to:

- Clair F. Gill (born 1943), U.S. Army major general
- Ian Gordon Gill (1919–2006), British Army major general
- Inderjit Singh Gill (1922–2001), Indian Army lieutenant general
- William H. Gill (1886–1976), U.S. Army major general

== See also ==
- Juan José Nieto Gil (1804–1866), Colombian Army general
- Herbert Gille (1897–1966), German SS general
