= Weart =

Weart may refer to:

== Surname ==
- Douglas Lafayette Weart (1891-1975), American major general
- John Walter Weart (1861-1941), Canadian politician
- Spencer R. Weart (born in 1942), American physician and historian

== Other use ==
- Mount Weart, British Columbia, Canada
