= François de Fleury =

French nobleman

François-Louis Teissèdre de Fleury
- Born: August 28, 1749; Saint-Hippolyte-du-Fort, Languedoc, France
- Died: 1799; France
- Spouse: Marie-Jeanne Lacour
- Relatives: François Teisseydre de Fleury (Father) Marguerite Domadieu (Mother)
- Military career
- Allegiance: Kingdom of France; United States; Kingdom of the French
- Branch: Corps of Engineers
- Service years: 1768–1776, 1782–1792 (France); 1777–1781 (USA)
- Rank: Colonel (Continental Army); Maréchal de camp (Equivalent to Major General)
- Conflicts: American Revolutionary War; Action of Piscataway; Battle of Brandywine; Battle of Germantown; Siege of Fort Mifflin; Battle of Monmouth; Battle of Rhode Island; Battle of Stony Point; Siege of Yorktown; French Revolutionary Wars
- Awards: Congressional Silver Medal; Order of Saint Louis

François-Louis Teissèdre de Fleury (August 28, 1749–1799) was a French nobleman who joined the Royal Army in 1768 and later volunteered to fight in the Continental Army during the American Revolutionary War. In America he demonstrated his bravery at Piscataway in May 1777 after which he was appointed an officer of engineers. He fought at the Brandywine in September and was wounded at Germantown in early October. He served capably during the Siege of Fort Mifflin where he was wounded again in November. George Washington made him an assistant to Friedrich Wilhelm von Steuben at Valley Forge in the spring of 1778. He served during the Monmouth Campaign in June 1778 and fought in Rhode Island in August.

While leading one of the attacking columns at Stony Point in July 1779, Fleury won an award for being the first attacker to enter the British bastion. Granted leave to return to France later that year, he returned to fight at Yorktown in October 1781. Back in the French army, he held commands in India and the Indian Ocean until 1790 when he returned to France. In the early part of the French Revolutionary War he was badly wounded and later resigned from the army. He received a pension in June 1796 and died in 1799. The De Fleury Medal, named for Fleury, is awarded to outstanding members of the United States Army Corps of Engineers.

== Early life ==
François-Louis Teissèdre de Fleury was born in Saint-Hippolyte-du-Fort, in Languedoc, France on August 28, 1749 to François Teisseydre de Fleury, Lord of Fleury, Cosseigneur of the town of St. Hipolitte and Marguerite Domadieu; was trained as an engineer; Educated in École royale du génie de Mézières (Royal Engineering School of Mézières ) and served in the French Army during the Corsican campaign.

In 1777 he volunteered to serve with the American Army in its fight for independence from Britain. The Continental Congress appointed de Fleury a captain of engineers, and he quickly proved himself. Wounded at the battles of Fort Mifflin and Brandywine (where his horse was shot out from under him), he soon became Lt. Col. de Fleury.

== Battle of Stony Point ==
But it was in the desperate Battle of Stony Point, New York in 1779 that de Fleury's courage under fire won him the accolades of Congress.

In June 1779 two small American forts were being established on the Hudson River at Stony Point and Verplanck's Point, about 30 miles from Manhattan Island. A large British force easily captured both sites. The enemy began building a strong defensive perimeter around Stony Point.

The Point was actually a peninsula jutting nearly half a mile into the Hudson, tipped with rocky crags which shot up 150 feet above the river. On the landward side was swamp which flooded at high tide, sinking a causeway running to the shore under two feet of water and making the Point an island.

The formidable defense included several batteries partially connected by trenches, log and earth redoubts around the main fort, and a double abatis. It was called "Little Gibraltar".

General George Washington was disturbed by the capture of the two forts. British occupation gave them control of a vital segment of the river and rerouted American communications, supplies and troops moving between New England and the other colonies. Worse, General Washington was convinced the enemy was preparing to strike West Point, less than 15 miles upriver.

American reinforcements were quickly moved into position north of Stony Point, but Washington thought there was no hope of recapture. A recently formed light infantry corps led by the daring Brigadier General "Mad" Anthony Wayne, consisted of hand picked combat veterans. The group was made up of four regiments of about 340 men each. Colonel Christian Febiger headed the 1st Regiment with de Fleury as second in command.

On July 15 the Corps, except for a small diversionary force, unloaded weapons and turned in their ammunition. Secrecy was so tight the troops did not know they were going to attempt to recapture Stony Point. For such a risky assault, surprise was vital; and the attack was to take place in total darkness. Fixed bayonets and hand-to-hand combat were the orders of the day. Wayne's column had no sooner sloshed into the waist-deep water before a British picket sent up an alarm. During the fierce fighting, Wayne and Febiger both suffered stunning head wounds.

The Continentals scrambled up the rocky slope with de Fleury in the lead. First over the wall, de Fleury was followed by a wave of American bayonets. Rushing to the flag pole, de Fleury cut the British colors from their staff.

In addition to the recapture of Stony Point, the defeat of the British fired the Americans' determination and lifted their morale. And it showed the enemy that the colonies had an able fighting force.

So it was that on 1 October 1779, de Fleury stood before the Continental Congress to be praised for his valor at Stony Point by the men who had penned the Declaration of Independence and would later sign the Constitution. For his intrepid behavior, the Continental Congress awarded a medal struck in his honor.

== Later life ==
He then left America on November 16. Fleury joined the French army once again and was made a major of the Saintonge Regiment in March of 1780. A few months later, he would join General Rochambeau's force. He fought in the Battle of Yorktown as a French soldier. He then left America on 1783 and joined the Pondichéry Regiment. On April 17, 1792, he was wounded abominably causing him to retire from the military. He married Marie-Jeanne Lacour on September 17, 1798, seven months before his death in Paris.

== See also ==
- De Fleury Medal
