= 249th Engineer Battalion (United States) =

249th Engineer Battalion (Prime Power)
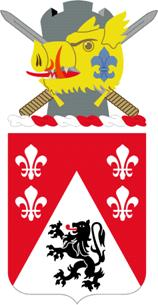
- 249th Engineer Battalion coat of arms
- Active: 5 May 1943 – 28 November 1945; 8 April 1948 – 22 May 1950; 9 February 1955 – 15 October 1991; 16 November 1994 - Present
- Country: United States
- Branch: Regular Army; Army Reserves
- Type: Engineer Battalion
- Size: Battalion
- Part of: U.S. Army Corps of Engineers
- Garrison/HQ: Fort Belvoir
- Nickname: "Black Lions"
- Mottos: "Build, Support, Sustain"
- Engagements: World War II; Desert Storm; Operation Provide Comfort; Operation Uphold Democracy; Operation Joint Endeavor; Operation Northern Watch; Operation Enduring Freedom; Operation Iraqi Freedom
- Decorations: Meritorious Unit Commendation; Army Superior Unit Award (4); Order of the Day of Belgian Army for actions in the Ardennes
- Website: Official 249th Engineer Battalion website

Commanders
- Commander: LTC Donald Schmidt
- Command Sergeant Major: CSM Pierre Crescimbeni

Insignia
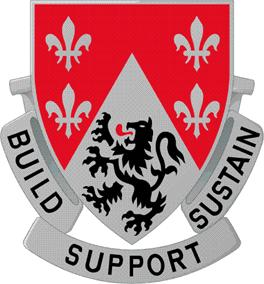
- Distinctive unit insignia

The 249th Engineer Battalion (Prime Power) is a versatile power generation battalion assigned to the U.S. Army Corps of Engineers that provides commercial-level power to military units and federal relief organizations during full-spectrum operations. Additionally, the commander serves as the Commandant of the U.S. Army Prime Power School, the institution responsible for the development of Army and Navy power generation specialists.

== Motto ==
The battalion's motto is "Build, Support, Sustain!".

== Units ==
- Headquarters and Headquarters Company – Fort Belvoir, Virginia
  - Heavy Maintenance Section – Fort Belvoir, Virginia
- A Company – Schofield Barracks, Hawaii
- B Company – Fort Bragg, North Carolina
- C Company – Fort Belvoir, Virginia
- D Company – (USAR) – Cranston, Rhode Island
  - 1st Platoon – Cranston, Rhode Island
  - 2nd Platoon – Cranston, Rhode Island
  - 3rd Platoon – Cranston, Rhode Island
  - 4th Platoon – Fort Belvoir, Virginia
- U.S. Army Prime Power School – Fort Leonard Wood, Missouri.

== Mission ==
Senior power plant operator, with the 1st Detachment, 249th Engineer Battalion, shows the circuits located at a substation on Logistical Support Area Anaconda, which is found in various areas located around the base that steps the power down to levels used in offices and trailers.

On order, deploy worldwide to provide prime electrical power and electrical systems expertise in support of military operations and the National Response Framework.

The 249th Engineer Battalion also supports other missions:

- Operation Enduring Freedom
- Operation Iraqi Freedom
- THAAD Power Support
- JLENS Power Support
- Intelligence and Security Command (INSCOM) (Korea generator maintenance)
- Operation Bright Star (Egypt)
- Chinhae generator maintenance
- Limited Installation support missions
- Task Force SAFE
- U.S. Army Corps of Engineers support to presidentially declared disasters

== History ==
=== As a combat engineer battalion ===
==== World War II ====
The 249th Engineer Combat Battalion was constituted on 5 May 1943 at Camp Bowie, Texas. The battalion was organized and under the command of only three captains. The other officers that were supplied to the unit were second lieutenants from the 1943 class of West Point. Shortly after, the battalion participated in two maneuvers in Louisiana, known as the "Louisiana Maneuvers"; there the battalion and its soldiers learned valuable lessons for war.

The 249th sailed from the United States to England in May 1944, after equipping and preparing for combat, the Unit landed on Utah Beach in August 1944 under the 1137th Engineer Combat Group commanded by Colonel George A. Morris. In October through November 1944, the soldiers were specially trained on using the Bailey bridge in Trier, France.

Later that year on 18 December 1944, the Black Lions were ordered to move from the Saar River, where the unit was building a bridge, to the Ardennes, commonly called the Battle of the Bulge. Upon arriving to the front, the 249th was assigned to the 26th Infantry Division, already engaged and in defensive positions along the southeast corner of the Bulge. The battalion was used in an effort to block the German advance by deploying landmines, obstacles and establishing roadblocks.

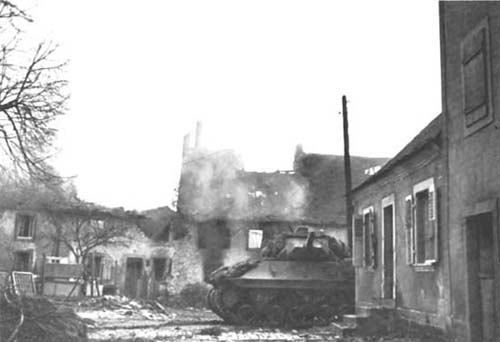
Fight in Arsdorf was brought to an end with a tank destroyer ending the two days of fighting between the engineers and German defenders of the town.

On 24 December 1944, Brigadier General Harlan Harkness, the assistant division commander, ordered the battalion to advance and secure the towns of Arsdorf and Bigonville to the north of the 26th Infantry Division, near the area of operations of the 4th Armored Division, in order to relieve the occupied towns so the division could advance and attack the enemy line. Companies A and C were ordered into the town of Arsdorf where the battalion was engaged in fierce combat for two days. It was later learned that the town had never been secured by the 4th Armored Division.

In February 1945, the battalion was selected for the special task of crossing the Rhine River. On 19 March 1945, the unit was assigned to the engineer task force charged with crossing the Rhine at Oppenheim. The main thrust of the effort was to use assault boats to get troops from 5th Infantry Division across and later to construct a more stable pontoon bridge. The battalion met little resistance across the river and quickly began constructing the bridge. After an accident resulting in a raft being sunk, the Battalion moved downriver to Mainz. After this bridge site was secure, the 249th was detached from the 1137th Engineer Group and was given the mission to secure and maintain the bridges on the Rhine River. In May 1945, when the war ended in Europe, the battalion was moved to Plattling, Germany where they built a camp for displaced refugees. In November 1945, the 249th Engineers were sent on their final orders to Camp Lucky Strike, near Marseilles, France and then redeployed back to the United States. The division was inactivated at Camp Patrick Henry, Virginia on 27 November 1945.

==== Post World War II ====
In late 1954, the Black Lion Battalion was withdrawn from the Reserves and assigned to the Regular Army. In February 1955, it was activated and assigned to USAREUR and an Engineer Battalion (Combat Heavy). From 1955 until 1960, the 249th Engineer Battalion (Construction) was stationed at Kleber Kaserne, ((Kaiserslautern, Germany)). Then it was dispatched to Etain, France for a time. Then the battalion was stationed at Gerszewski Barracks, Knielingen, Karlsruhe, Germany, under the command of the 18th Engineer Brigade, where it provided construction support to USAREUR elements stationed in Germany for the Cold War.

=== As a prime power battalion ===
In 1994, the battalion was reactivated and designated as the 249th Engineer Battalion (Prime Power), stationed at Fort Belvoir, VA.

==== 9/11 ====
Immediately after the attacks on the World Trade Center on 11 September 2001, elements of the 249th were deployed to New York City and were instrumental in restoring power to Wall Street enabling the financial district to resume operations within a week of the attack.

==== Global War on Terrorism ====
BG Silva recognized four 2/A/249th Soldiers for their efforts supporting surge operations during an awards ceremony.

The 249th Engineer Battalion (Prime Power) provides oversight on all coalition operating base power projects in Iraq (Operation Iraqi Freedom) and Afghanistan (Operation Enduring Freedom).

==== Hurricane Katrina ====
The 249th deployed teams to the Gulf Region under Joint Task Force Katrina, working with contractors, and local and state entities to assess, they helped install and maintain emergency generators at critical facilities. By 5 September 2005, the 17th Street Canal breach was closed. Blackhawk and Chinook helicopters had dropped over 200 sand bags, with approximately 125 sandbags breaking the surface of the water. After the emergency was over, plans called for the canal to be drained and the wall repaired.

There were three 42" mobile pumps staged and two 42" and two 30" pumps were placed at the sheet pile closure. Sewer & water board, electric utility and the 249th Engineer Battalion (Prime Power) were completing pump house inspection. When the pumps began operation, a 40-foot-wide opening was made in the sheet piling to allow water to flow out of the canal.

==== Worldwide ====
Through the United States Army Corps of Engineers, the 249th soldiers provide contracting officer technical representation on projects throughout the world.

== Lineage ==
- Constituted 25 February 1943 in the Army of the United States as the 249th Engineer Combat Battalion
- Activated 5 May 1943 at Camp Bowie, Texas
- Inactivated 28 November 1945 at Camp Patrick Henry, Virginia
- Redesignated 23 March 1948 as the 442d Engineer Construction Battalion and allotted to the Organized Reserves
- Activated 8 April 1948 with headquarters at Ames, Iowa
- (Organized Reserves redesignated 25 March 1948 as the Organized Reserve Corps; redesignated 9 July 1952 as the Army Reserve)
- Inactivated 22 May 1950 at Ames and Council Bluffs, Iowa
- Redesignated 25 June 1952 as the 249th Engineer Construction Battalion
- Redesignated 9 December 1954 as the 249th Engineer Battalion; concurrently withdrawn from the Army Reserve and allotted to the Regular Army
- Activated 9 February 1955 in Germany
- Inactivated 15 October 1991 in Germany
- Activated 16 November 1994 at Fort Belvoir, Virginia

== Honors ==
=== Campaign participation credit ===
==== World War II ====
1. Northern France
2. Rhineland
3. Ardennes-Alsace
4. Central Europe

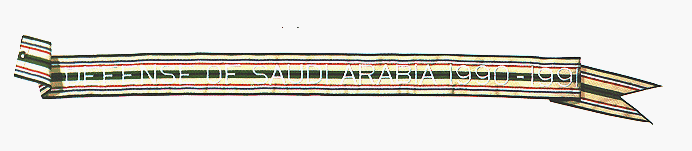
Army campaign streamer of Defense of Saudi Arabia.

==== Southwest Asia ====
1. Defense of Saudi Arabia
2. Liberation and Defense of Kuwait
3. Cease-Fire

=== Decorations ===
- Cited in the Order of the Day of the Belgian Army for actions in the Ardennes
- Meritorious Unit Commendation (Army) for SOUTHWEST ASIA 1990–1991
- Army Superior Unit Award for 25 Aug 92 – 28 Oct 92
- Army Superior Unit Award for 1994–1995
- Army Superior Unit Award for 1995–1996
- Army Superior Unit Award for 2005 (Hurricanes Katrina, Rita, & Wilma)
- Army Superior Unit Award for 2011-2012

== See also ==
- United States Army Corps of Engineers
- Civil engineering and infrastructure repair in New Orleans after Hurricane Katrina
- Army Nuclear Power Program
