= Battle of Stony Point =

1779 battle of the American Revolutionary War

Coordinates: 41.241°N 73.974°W

- Part of the American Revolutionary War
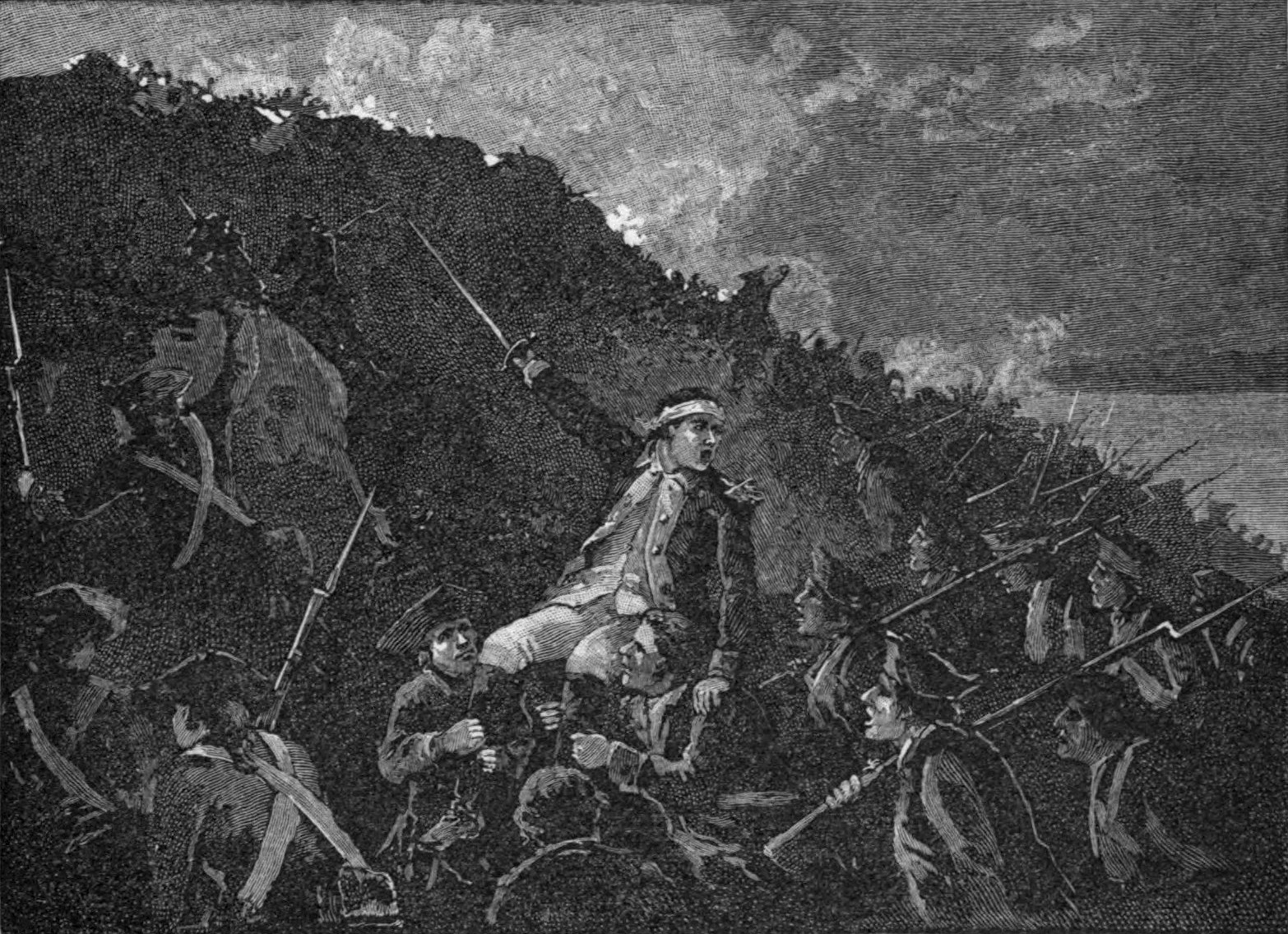
- Capture of Stony Point by Wayne
Date	July 16, 1779; 247 years ago
Location	Stony Point, New York, U.S.
Result	American victory

Belligerents
United States	Great Britain

Commanders and leaders
Anthony Wayne (WIA)	Henry Johnson (POW)

Strength
1,500	750

Casualties and losses
15 killed 83 wounded	20 killed 74 wounded prisoners 472 unwounded prisoners 58 missing

The Battle of Stony Point took place on July 16, 1779, during the American Revolutionary War. In a well-planned and -executed nighttime attack, a highly trained select group of George Washington's Continental Army troops under the command of Brigadier General "Mad Anthony" Wayne defeated British troops in a quick and daring assault on their outpost in Stony Point, New York, located in present day Rockland County, approximately 30 mi (48 km) north of New York City.

The British suffered heavy losses in a battle that served as an important victory in terms of morale for the Continental Army. While the fort was ordered evacuated quickly after the battle by General Washington, this key crossing site was used later in the war by units of the Continental Army to cross the Hudson River during the final stages of the war.

== Background ==
Following the surrender of General John Burgoyne after the Battles of Saratoga in October 1777 and the subsequent entry of France into the war as an American ally, British strategy in dealing with the rebellious Americans was forced to change. In the northern states, their strategy was reduced to raids against targets of economic and military importance, and unsuccessful attempts to bring General George Washington's Continental Army into a decisive confrontation. Washington deployed his army in strong positions around the principal British base at New York City, and refused to be drawn out of them.

British military plans for 1779 were large in ambition, but were ultimately hampered, in the opinion of their North American commander in chief, Lieutenant General Sir Henry Clinton, by shortages of manpower, and delays in the arrival of manpower that was promised for the campaign. Clinton sought to force Washington to weaken the Continental Army camp at Middlebrook in northern New Jersey, after which he would march in force out of New York and capture it. This, Clinton believed, would threaten Washington's supply lines, drawing him out of the highlands on the Hudson River into more favorable terrain for a general engagement.

=== British dispositions ===
In late May 1779, General Clinton led a force of about 8,000 men up the North (or Hudson) River as the opening move in this strategy. The British strategists realized that the Stony Point location represented a vital area that controlled that portion of the Hudson River and the entrance to the Hudson Highlands, as well as the nearby Kings Ferry crossing. Because of this they decided to assault it. General Clinton, with approximately 6,000 British, Loyalist, and Hessian soldiers under his command sailed up the Hudson, transported by the Royal Navy and landed unopposed.

Stony Point was defended by a meager force totaling around 40 American Patriots, and before escaping to the north the small garrison set fire to the wooden blockhouse that was the unfinished fort built atop Stony Point. The British forces, in order to capture nearby Fort Lafayette, hauled several cannons up the steep and rugged slopes of Stony Point and used the vantage point to shell Fort Lafayette. This move effectively closed King's Ferry, a major river crossing at that narrow point in the river, about 10 miles (16 km) south of West Point and 35 miles (56 km) north of New York City.

While he waited for reinforcements to arrive so that he might march on Middlebrook, Clinton dispatched William Tryon and more than 2,000 troops on a raiding expedition in early July against coastal communities in Connecticut, claiming in retrospect that its purpose was to draw Washington's troops further east. Clinton reduced the garrisons at Stony Point and Verplanck's Point for the operation, which failed to draw Washington out of his camps.

Stony Point was garrisoned with elements of the 17th Regiment of Foot under the command of Lt. Col. Henry Johnson. The 17th was reinforced by a grenadier company belonging to one of the two battalions of the 71st Regiment, and a company-strength detachment of the Loyal American Regiment. A detachment of the Royal Artillery manned fifteen field pieces that included five iron and two brass cannon, four mortars and four small howitzers. A Royal Navy gunboat was assigned to protect the river approaches to the fortifications, and the armed sloop Vulture was also anchored in that part of the river.

Washington observed construction of the fortifications through a telescope from atop nearby Buckberg Mountain. Historians also believe he used intelligence gathered from local merchants to get a better idea of the strength of the garrison, the types of watchwords in use, and the placement of sentries – especially on the south side of the point, which could not be seen from Buckberg. During this time he formulated a plan of attack and selected a commander to lead it – Brigadier General Anthony Wayne, commander of the Pennsylvania Line.

The British position at Stony Point was a fortified one, but it was never intended to be a true fort in the 18th century European sense of the word. No stone was used and no walls were constructed. The defenses consisted of earthen fleches (cannon positions) and wooden abatis (felled trees sharpened to a point and placed in earthen embankments). The defenses were situated on a rocky elevation approachable only from the west, protected in the front by a watery defile and on both flanks by extensive swampy areas.

=== American forces and tactics ===
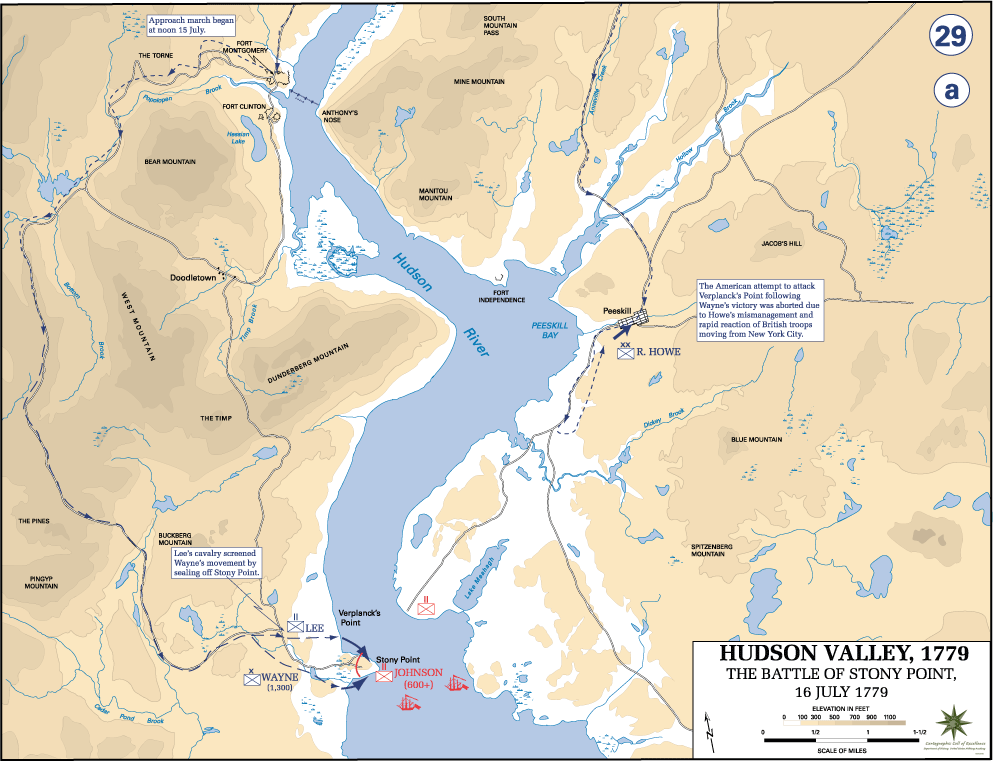
A map showing the approach by Wayne's force to Stony Point.

To storm the position, the Corps of Light Infantry was formed on June 12, with command assigned to General Wayne. The Corps of Light Infantry was an elite, seasonal combat organization drafted in each of the years between 1777 and 1781 from the light infantry companies of each regiment in Washington's army. The 1779 Corps was organized into a brigade of four regiments, each composed of two battalions of four companies, with the following order of battle:

- 1st Regiment, commanded by Col. Christian Febiger of the 2nd Virginia Regiment: six companies of Virginia and two of Pennsylvania troops
- 2nd Regiment, Col. Richard Butler (9th Pennsylvania Regiment): four companies each of Pennsylvanians and of Marylanders;
- 3rd Regiment, Col. Return Jonathan Meigs (6th Connecticut Regiment): eight companies of Connecticut troops
- 4th Regiment, a partially organized detachment of six companies of Massachusetts troops and two of North Carolina, temporarily commanded by Major William Hull (8th Massachusetts Regiment). The 4th Regiment was fully organized in August and assigned to the command of Col. Rufus Putnam.

The plan called for a night attack on the fortifications to be carried out by the 1,350 men of the corps. Each regiment consisted of 300 to 340 men, and the total force included an artillery detachment to man captured British field pieces. According to 18th century military doctrine, this was not enough men to take a well-prepared defensive position, but in addition to the element of surprise, Washington's plan exploited a fatal flaw in the fortifications.

The wooden abatis along the southern shore of the point were not extended into the deep water of the Hudson and could be outflanked by attackers along a narrow beach at low tide. The main attack would be along this approach, but Washington advised that if practicable, secondary and diversionary attacks could also be made along the north shore of the point and across the causeway to the center.

Washington gave Wayne his instructions, along with permission to modify the plan as necessary. This was an unusual act for Washington, and indicates the high opinion he had of Wayne's tactical abilities. The assault would be difficult: it would be carried out in the dead of night, called for the men to scale the steep, rocky sides of Stony Point, and required surprise. To accomplish this last element, Washington ordered that the men carry unloaded muskets and attack using only bayonets to maintain silence, a tactic often employed by the British army, and had been used to devastating effect against Wayne two years prior at Paoli.

The exception to loaded weaponry were the two companies of North Carolina light infantry, which Wayne ordered to cross the causeway, and stage a demonstration attack at the center of the British defenses, where the British expected an attack to come. This battalion, commanded by Maj. Hardy Murfree, was instructed to lay down a "gauling fire" with their weapons as a diversionary tactic.

Wayne selected Butler's 2nd Regiment of approximately 300 men to conduct an assault along the northern shore of the point, while Wayne himself would lead the main column in the south, consisting of the 1st and 3rd Regiments, and Hull's detachment of Massachusetts light infantry. The columns deployed an advance force of 100 and 150 men respectively wielding axes to clear obstacles, with 20 men from each advance force assigned as the forlorn hopes, to protect the force and to be the first to enter the works. Wayne announced that he would give prize bounties to the first men who entered the works, and to anyone else who distinguished himself in the action.

== Battle ==
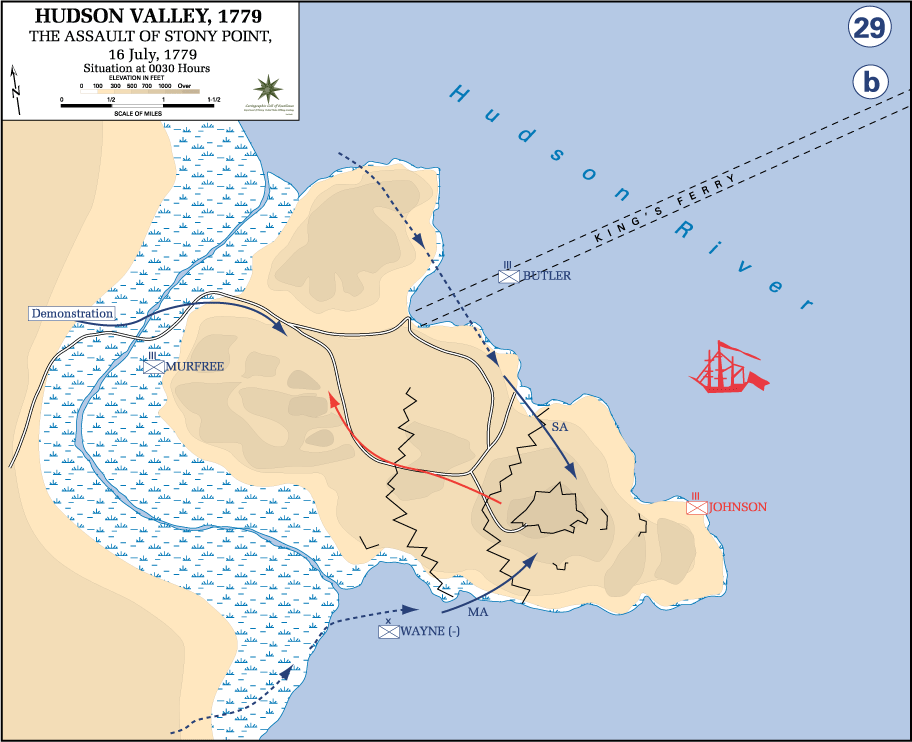
A map showing the assault on Stony Point.

After a morning muster, on July 15, the Corps of Light Infantry marched from Sandy Beach north of Fort Montgomery beginning at noon. Any civilians met along the route of march were to be taken into custody to prevent them from warning the British. The column, often forced to march single file over rough terrain and roads hardly more than paths, took a circuitous route west through Queensboro to the west and over Dunderberg Mountain to avoid detection by the British. The Corps began arriving at 8 p.m. at the Springsteel farm, a mile and a half (2 km) west of the fortifications, and by 10 p.m. had been formed in the attack columns.

The men were given a rum ration and their orders. They were also given pieces of white paper to pin to their hats in order to help them tell each other from the British in the darkness. The columns then moved out at 11:30 p.m. to their jump-off points, diverging immediately, to begin the assault at midnight. These attack columns were led by groups of volunteer soldiers nicknamed the "forlorn hope" who were responsible for breaking holes in enemy defenses and along with their weapons, were armed with axes and picks.

Bad weather that night aided the Continentals. Cloud cover cut off moonlight and high winds forced the British ships in Haverstraw Bay to leave their posts off Stony Point and move downriver. At midnight, as scheduled, the attack began with the columns crossing the swampy flanks of the point. The southern column unexpectedly found its approach inundated in two to four feet of water and required thirty minutes to wade to the first line of abatis, during which it and Murfree's demonstration force were spotted by British sentries and fired upon.

Under fire Wayne's column succeeded in getting inside the British first line of defenses. Wayne himself was struck in the head by a spent musket ball and fell to the ground, leaving Col. Febiger to take over command of Wayne's column. Meanwhile, Butler's column had succeeded in cutting its way through the abatis, sustaining the only loss of life on the American side while doing so. The two columns penetrated the British line almost simultaneously and seized the summit when six companies of the 17th Regiment of Foot took positions opposite the diversionary attack and were cut off.

Because of the stealth in which the Patriot assault forces approached the British defenses on the slopes of the hill, the artillery pieces that the British had placed on the summit for just such defensive purposes were unsuccessful in repelling the attack. Due to the speed at which the Patriot infantrymen were moving, the British cannons could not be lowered to an angle low enough to sufficiently harass the men assaulting up the hill.

The first man into the British upper works was Lt. Col. Francois de Fleury, an aristocrat French engineer commanding a battalion of the 1st Regiment. He was followed by Lt. Henry Knox, Sgt. William Baker, Sgt William Spencer and Sgt. George Donlop. As the men entered the British works they called out, "The fort's our own!" – the prearranged watchword to distinguish friend from foe. The action lasted 25 minutes and was over by 1 a.m.

Wayne's losses were 15 killed and 83 wounded. 546 prisoners were taken, 74 of whom were wounded. Some Patriot sources stated that there were 63 British dead but military historian Mark M. Boatner accepts the official British report of 20 killed. However, the report (from Lt-Col. Johnson to Sir Henry Clinton on July 24) also lists 58 missing separate from killed, wounded, and captured, many of whom may have drowned in the Hudson.

Before dawn, Wayne sent a brief dispatch telling Washington, "The fort and garrison, with Colonel Johnston, are ours. Our officers and men behaved like men who are determined to be free." The next day, Washington rode into the works to inspect the battlefield and congratulate the troops. For his exploits, Wayne was awarded a medal by Congress, one of the few issued during the revolution.

== Aftermath ==
While the strategic value of capturing Stony Point was up for debate, it was regardless, a huge victory for morale for the Continental Army. Its minimal strategic value was that it asserted Washington's foothold on the nearby West Point. Washington visited the battle site on the 17th of July, and applauded the men responsible for its capture after viewing the harsh terrain that was traversed by the assaulting forces.

Washington's instructions to Wayne had allowed for the possibility of an assault on Verplanck's Point once Stony Point was taken. As part of the attack on Stony Point, Washington had directed two brigades to begin moving toward Verplanck's, and dispatched Colonel Rufus Putnam with a small force to divert the attention of its British garrison. Putnam was able to begin diversionary fire against Verplanck's shortly after the assault on Stony Point began, and he successfully distracted the British until morning.

On the morning of the 16th Wayne's forces turned Stony Point's cannons against Verplanck's, but the fire at long range did no significant damage. The fire was sufficient, however, to prompt the Vulture to cut her anchor and drift downstream. Washington then sent General Robert Howe to lead the two brigades to besiege Verplanck's on the 17th, but the force was not provisioned with adequate artillery or siege equipment, and could do little more than blockade the fort. On the 18th some British troops were landed from ships sent upriver, and more were rumored to be coming overland, so Howe decided to withdraw.

Washington had not intended to hold either point, and Stony Point was abandoned by the Americans on July 18, after carrying off the captured cannons and supplies. The British briefly reoccupied the site only to abandon it in October, as General Clinton prepared a major expedition to the southern states.

Some of the captured officers were exchanged immediately after the battle, but the more than 400 prisoners of other ranks were marched off to a prison camp at Easton, Pennsylvania. An unsuccessful attempt by a small number of prisoners on July 17 to overpower their captors resulted in one British sergeant killed and about 20 other ranks wounded.

Contemporary Patriot accounts note that Wayne had given quarter to the garrison of Stony Point despite the alleged treatment of his own men at the "Paoli Massacre" in 1777. British reports also remarked that unanticipated clemency was immediately shown the garrison. Because of the relative ease with which the Continental Army took over the fort however, the British commander of Stony Point, Colonel Johnson, was court martialed in New York City with accusations against him of inadequate defense.

=== Geography ===
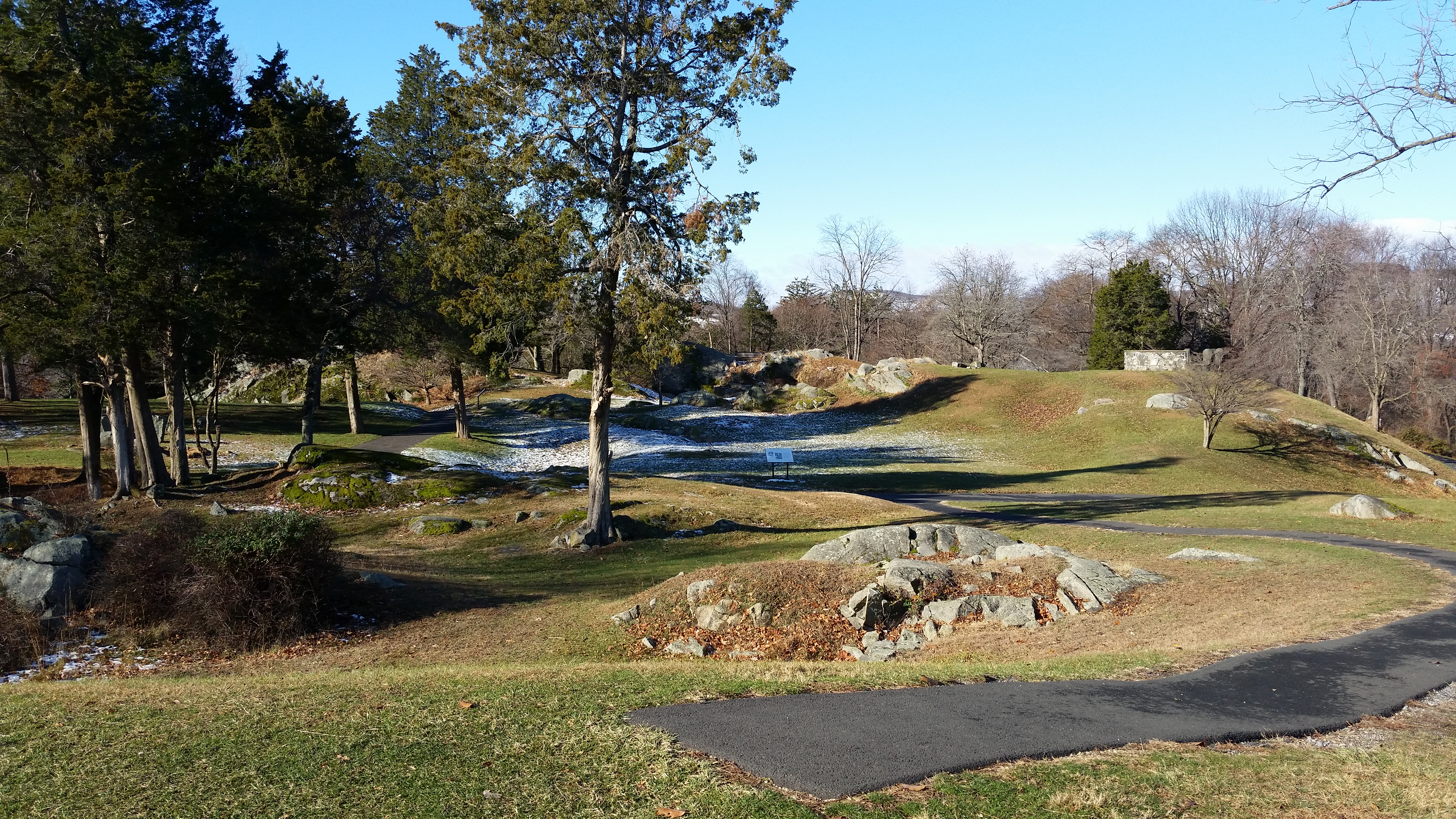
The historic site at Stony Point.

Situated about 30 miles north of New York City, the location of the fort at Stony Point was a vital place in terms of control of the lower Hudson River, as well as control over the major ferry crossing known as Kings Ferry, which crossed between Stony Point and Verplanck's Point. This ferry crossing was of key importance to both sides as it was a main point for the exchange of trade and supplies from New England to the rest of the colonies.

Twelve miles north of Stony Point was West Point. This made the fort even more vital to the security of that region. West Point was a strategic fortification to General George Washington's Continental Army as the fortress and defenses there were vital in keeping control over the upper reaches of the Hudson River.

A roughly triangular promontory jutting into the Hudson river just below Peekskill, New York, with steep rocky slopes rising up to a 150-foot summit, Stony Point boasts formidable natural defenses. This made assaulting the position such a daunting task and prompted the nickname 'Little Gibraltar'.

At the time of the battle, Stony Point was virtually an island, surrounded by water on all sides but the west, where a swampy area all but severed the Point from dry land. Today the swamp is now mostly dry, but otherwise the position is relatively unchanged, apart from a lighthouse and a museum with other State Park structures atop the hill.

=== Battlefield preservation ===
The Stony Point State Historic Site preserves the battlefield and has interpretive materials, tours, and demonstrations, primarily during the summer season. A museum on the site features artifacts from the battle, including a howitzer and two mortars. The site was designated a National Historic Landmark in 1961, and was listed on the National Register of Historic Places in 1966. Many of the original man made defenses built by the British still exist today. Markers and memorials commemorate certain sights and locations of key battles atop the fortress. The slopes leading up to the summit, which at the time of the battle were stripped of all foliage and vegetation for maximum defensive fields of fire, are now overgrown with vegetation.

=== In media ===
A fictionalized version of the battle is featured in season three of the AMC television series Turn: Washington's Spies. The battle is incorrectly depicted as taking place during wintertime rather than summertime and the Americans are led by Major Benjamin Talmadge rather than General Anthony Wayne.

== See also ==
- American Revolutionary War § Stalemate in the North. Places ' Battle of Stony Point ' in overall sequence and strategic context.
