= United States Army Prime Power School =

US military training unit

The U.S. Army Prime Power School is run by the United States Army Corps of Engineers at Fort Leonard Wood, Missouri since January 2011, having previously moved from Fort Belvoir, Virginia. The mission of the school is to produce MOS 12P – Prime Power Production Specialists (formerly MOS 52E and 21P) for the U.S. Army.

== Training ==
The U.S. Army Prime Power Production Specialist Course is located at Fort Leonard Wood, Missouri. This year long training program trains Active, Army Reserve soldiers, and Navy Seabees. Upon graduation Army personnel are awarded MOS 12P20 and Navy personnel awarded NEC 5633. Students earn over 30 semester hours of college credit while attaining the knowledge and skills associated with installing, operating, and maintaining large medium voltage electrical power plants. The course is challenging and requires a large amount of home study.

The 12P20 Course consists of an Academic Phase and Operator Training Phase. This course lasts approximately 29 weeks and provides students with the necessary knowledge and skills to install, operate, and maintain, medium voltage electrical power plants.

Following completion of the 12P20 course, students are selected to attend one of three Additional Skill Identifier (ASI) Courses. The Electrical Specialty Course provides direct and general support maintenance training on a wide variety of electrical power components. The Instrumentation Specialty Course provides direct and general support maintenance training on AC and DC control circuits and components as well as engine and generator protective circuits and components. Both the electrical and instrumentation specialties provide in depth instruction in electronics and AC power theory. The Mechanical Specialty Course provides direct and general support maintenance training on two- and four-stroke diesel engines to include complete rebuild practical exercises. Additionally, in depth instruction is provided on a wide variety of mechanical systems components.

=== Academic Phase ===
The first phase is 16 weeks of training. Students are provided knowledge in academic subjects that are necessary to master future specialty courses. Mathematics, physics, and the fundamentals of mechanical and electrical engineering are core subject courses. Analytical and problem solving skills are developed through practical exercise, laboratory work, and assigned problems in each subject course. Students are expected to dedicate many hours to complete homework and lab reports. In academics phase, students will earn 32 college credits from Lincoln University, Jefferson City, Missouri.

=== Operator Phase ===
The second phase of training, focusing on "hands-on" instruction, power plant technologies, operation and maintenance of power plants. This is a thirteen-week course training Army, Navy, Army Reserve and select civilian personnel in electrical safety, electrical and mechanical print reading, basic electrical distribution system design, basic understanding of the major components used in electrical distribution systems, electrical and mechanical protective systems used in electrical power production, diesel engine and electrical theory and power plant operations, to include installation, operation, repair, and maintenance of medium voltage electrical power plants.

Students learn how to operate and maintain the Army's Multi-Unit 4.5 Megawatt electrical power plants, 3 Megawatt electrical power plants consisting of either the MEP-012A or MEP-208A 750 kilowatt generating units, and the Deployable Power Generation Distribution System (DPGDS) power system consisting of either the MEP-810A or B model.

During the operator phase, students will earn an additional 6 college credits.

=== Specialty Phase ===
The third and final phase of training is 18 weeks long and focuses on one of three specialties: electrical, instrumentation, or mechanical.

The electrical course has nine annexes. The annexes cover Electrical Fundamentals, Basic Electronics, Electrical Practices and Standards, Motors and Generators, Machine Controllers, Cable Splicing, Transformers, Circuit Breakers and Distribution Systems.

In Electrical Fundamentals, students learn the various circuit rules and calculations, how to operate test equipment for troubleshooting circuits, electronic soldering, power quality and building circuits on a breadboard. Training in Basic Electronics covers many different electronic devices, how they work, how to test and troubleshoot them and their function in the circuit. Students attending the Electrical Practices and Standards classes are taught the National Electrical Code and conduit bending. Students learn to calculate bend radius, conductor size, conductor type for a specific location, circuit protection, box fill and maximum number of conductors in a raceway. Classes in Motors and Generators cover single-phase and three-phase motors and generators, their maintenance, troubleshooting and repair. Machine Controllers will teach students all the different types of motor controls and why they are used, learn how to wire those controllers, diagnose faults and repair the faulty component. In the Cable Splicing class students learn how to splice and terminate low and medium voltage power cables up to 15,000 volts; how to locate underground power cable by using a tracing tool and then find the location of the fault in the cable. The Transformer annex covers transformer theory, calculations and construction. Students learn how to wire single-phase and three-phase connections, test dry and oil filled transformers and test the insulating oil in the transformers. Circuit Breaker training teaches students the maintenance, testing and repair of circuit breakers from small molded case circuit breakers all the way up to 15,000-volt air magnetic; oil filled and vacuum circuit breakers. Distribution Systems students learn the different types of generating systems and distribution systems. Students also learn about grounding systems, testing of grounding systems and personnel protective grounding. In this annex students learn aerial line material, line equipment tools and how to perform an infrared survey. Soldier students who complete this course are awarded ASI S3.

The purpose of the Instrumentation Course is to provide the student, Power Plant Instrumentation Specialist, with skills and knowledge in the methods and techniques necessary to safely perform troubleshooting, testing, maintenance, and repair of instrumentation systems and components used on electrical power generation and distribution equipment. The Instrumentation Specialty course emphasizes higher-level thinking and mathematical analysis of abstract concepts involving operational theory of electronic components and systems. The course begins with a formalization of the mathematical and basic AC and DC circuit theories and concepts that were taught in the Academics Phase. From this, the course builds the students knowledge of electronics, digital systems, and automated process controls, to include programmable logic controllers (PLC's). Among other projects, students design, build and troubleshoot a multistage amplifier and build a multimeter. The course concludes with a study of relay control systems in power production and distribution.

Skills learned include the testing, calibration, troubleshooting and repair of systems and components used in the measurement, regulation, protection and control of signals, quantities and processes. Upon completion of this course, the student is awarded an Additional Skill Identifier (ASI) of E-5.

Mechanical Specialty students receive crew to depot level training on power plant maintenance. The training is a combination of lecture and hands-on practical exercise.

Subject areas for the Mechanical Training Phase include Diesel Engines and Systems, Allied Skills (hand, precision and power tools), Electric Arc and Oxyacetylene Welding, Fluid Handling Systems (piping systems, air compressors and pumps) and Diesel Engine Maintenance, Troubleshooting, and Rebuild. The predominant engines in the course are the 12-cylinder, Cummins KTA38 (38 liters/2300 cubic inches), the 16-cylinder, 9072 cubic inches, General Motors Electro-Motive Diesel (EMD), and the inline 6-cylinder Caterpillar 3456 Diesel Engine. Students who complete this course are awarded Additional Skill Indicator (ASI) S2.

== See also ==
- 249th Engineer Battalion (Prime Power)
- Fort Belvoir, Virginia
- U.S. Army Training and Doctrine Command (TRADOC)
