= Frederick J. Clarke =

United States Army general (1915–2002)

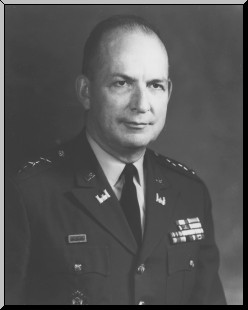
- Lieutenant General Frederick J. Clarke
- Born: 1 March 1915; Little Falls, New York
- Died: 4 February 2002 (aged 86); Fort Belvoir, Virginia
- Burial place: Arlington National Cemetery
- Military career
- Allegiance: United States of America
- Branch: United States Army
- Service years: 1937–1973
- Rank: Lieutenant General
- Commands: Chief of Engineers; United States Army Engineer School; Hanford Engineer Works
- Conflicts: World War II; Korean War; Vietnam War
- Awards: Distinguished Service Medal; Legion of Merit; Commendation Ribbon
- Other work

Engineer Commissioner of the District of Columbia
- In office 1 August 1960 – 8 July 1963
- Preceded by: Alvin C. Welling
- Succeeded by: Charles Marsden Duke

Frederick James Clarke (1 March 1915 – 4 February 2002) was a civil and military engineer with the United States Army Corps of Engineers. Clarke was one of three commissioners appointed to run the District of Columbia from 1960 to 1963. He rose to the rank of lieutenant General as the Chief of Engineers.

A 1937 graduate of the United States Military Academy at West Point, New York, where he graduated fourth in his class, Clarke earned a Master of Science degree in civil engineering from Cornell University in 1940. During World War II he commanded an engineer battalion on Ascension Island in the South Atlantic, and he supervised the construction of a military airfield there that became a key refueling point for transatlantic flights to Africa. He then served on the staff of the Army Service Forces. After the war ended he was area engineer of the Manhattan Project's Hanford Engineer Works, and was executive officer of the Armed Forces Special Weapons Project at Sandia Base.

As district engineer of the Trans-East District of the Corps from 1957 to 1959, he was responsible for military construction in Pakistan and Saudi Arabia. From 1960 to 1963 he was one of the three federally appointed commissioners that governed the District of Columbia and initiated the construction of the Washington Metro railway and subway system. As chairman of the District's zoning commission, he participated in early debates over the proposals to build a bridge near the Three Sisters Islands in the Potomac River. He was the Director of Military Construction in the Office of the Chief of Engineers from 1963 1965, the Commanding General of the Army Engineer Center and Commandant of the United States Army Engineer School at Fort Belvoir from 1965 to 1966, and Deputy Chief of Engineers from 1966 to 1969. As Chief of Engineers from 1969 to 1973 he guided the Corps as it devoted increased attention to the environmental impact of its work.

== Early life ==
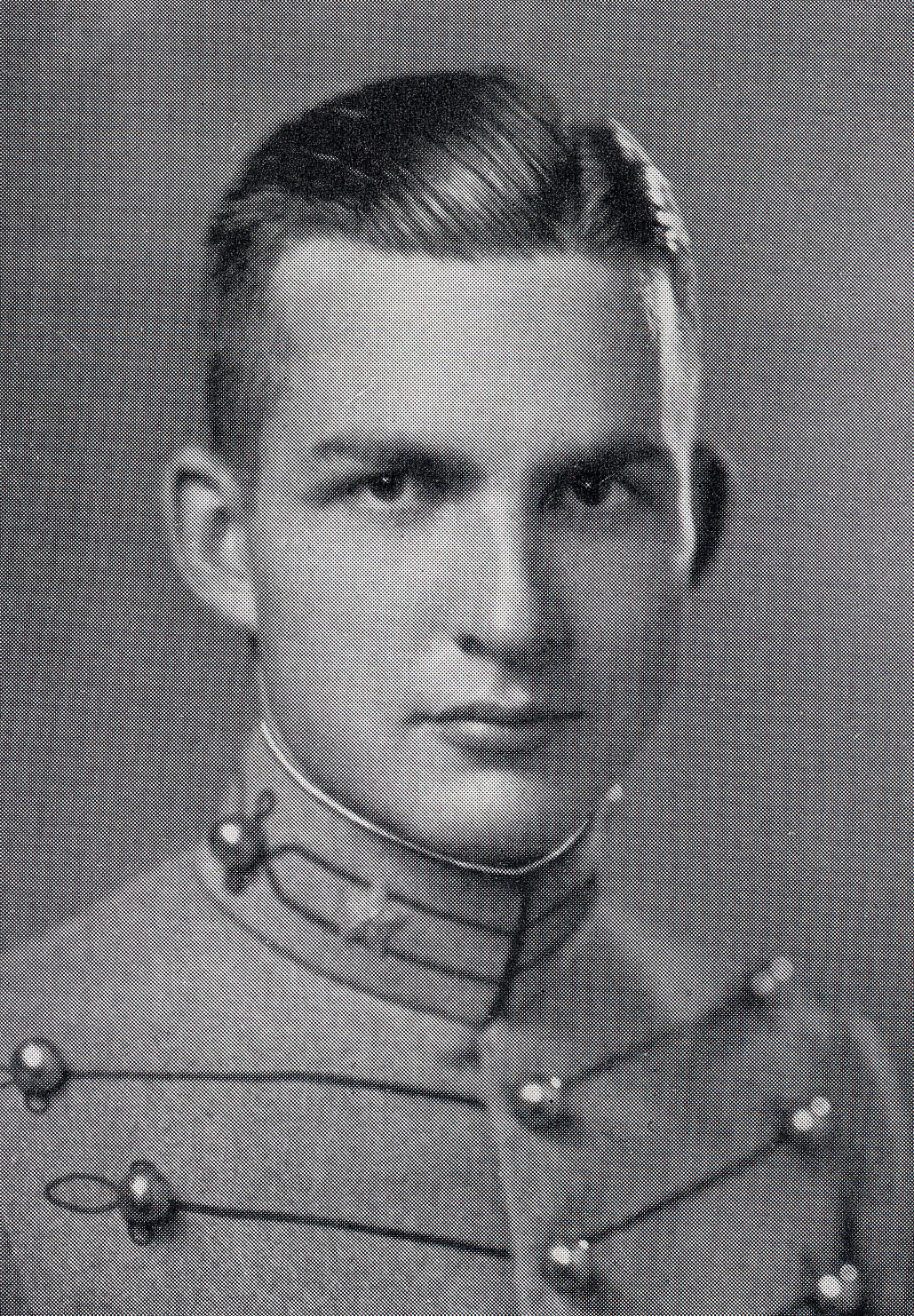
Clarke as a United States Military Academy cadet c. 1937

Clarke was born in Little Falls, New York on 1 March 1915. His father was a machine shop foreman at a local dairy equipment manufacturer. His mother died in the 1918 influenza pandemic. He had a sister. He was educated at a parochial elementary school and the local high school in Little Falls. Following his junior high school year he worked for Western Union during the summer, and after graduation he joined it full time as a teletype operator. He intended to save enough money to study engineering at the University of Michigan, and attempted to save $500 (equivalent to $11,198 in 2025) for tuition. One day he saw an advertisement for a competitive examination for entry to the United States Military Academy at West Point, New York, and he took it. A local man who had graduated from West Point thirty years before gave him a letter of introduction to his local congressman, Representative James Wolcott Wadsworth Jr. of New York's 39th congressional district, who appointed him.

Clarke entered West Point on 1 July 1933.He graduated fourth in the class of 1937 on 12 June 1937 and was commissioned as a second lieutenant in the United States Army Corps of Engineers. He was assigned to the 5th Engineer Regiment at Fort Belvoir, Virginia, While at West Point he met and courted Isabel Van Slyke, who worked for the League of Nations Association as a research assistant. They were married in the Chapel of the Most Holy Trinity at West Point in September 1938. They had a son, Pat, and two daughters, Isabel and Nancy. Engineering officers normally earned additional qualification soon after graduation, and he entered Cornell University, where he studied structural and soil engineering. He received his Master of Science degree in civil engineering in September 1940. He was promoted to first lieutenant on 12 June 1940 and captain on 9 September 1940.

== World War II ==
In August 1940, Clarke assumed command of Company C of the 15th Engineer Battalion, which was based at Fort Bragg, North Carolina, as part of the 9th Infantry Division. In June 1941 he joined the 38th Engineer Regiment at Fort Jackson, South Carolina. After the Japanese attack on Pearl Harbor that brought the United States Into World War II, he attended an abbreviated wartime Command and General Staff College course at Fort Leavenworth, Kansas. He then assumed command of the 1st Battalion, 38th Engineer Regiment. In February 1942, his battalion sailed to Ascension Island in the South Atlantic, where he supervised the construction of a military airfield there that became a key refueling point for transatlantic flights to Africa. He was promoted to major on 1 February 1942.

His battalion's next assignment was to construct a chain of airbases across Africa, but when he returned to the United States in July 1942 to collect the plans, he was reassigned to the planning division of the headquarters of Army Service Forces in Washington, D.C. He was engaged in long-range logistical planning for communications, airfield and port construction, road and railway rehabilitation, and hospitals. "My logistics training was one hour at the Leavenworth course" he later recalled. "All I remembered was that what went on the ship last came off first." But the commander of Army Service Forces, Lieutenant General Brehon B. Somervell wanted a major who had attended the Command and General Staff College, and had served overseas. This reduced the number of potential candidates greatly. His group drew up lists of supplies required for campaigns in Africa, China and the Pacific. Some of these contingencies occurred while others did not. As the war in Europe ended, he was involved in the frenzied planning effort to redirect supplies to the Pacific. He was promoted to lieutenant colonel on 22 December 1942 and colonel on 15 May 1945. He visited theater commands in Europe, South America and the Pacific, and after the war in Germany and Japan. He was awarded the Legion of Merit for his service.

== Post war ==
After the war ended, Clarke was assigned to the Manhattan Engineer District as part of a process of replacing its reservist officers with regulars. He succeeded Colonel Franklin T. Matthias as the area engineer at the Hanford Engineer Works in January 1946. He was responsible for the production of plutonium there, and oversaw the town of Richland, with a population of 25,000 people, although it was declining from its wartime peak. The Manhattan Project ended on 31 December 1946, but Clarke stayed on at Hanford as the Atomic Energy Commission's area operations officer until September 1947. He was then transferred to Sandia Base near Albuquerque, New Mexico, as executive officer of the Armed Forces Special Weapons Project at the personal request of its commander, Lieutenant General Leslie R. Groves Jr. At Sandia he oversaw the construction of new facilities and the establishment of training programs for weapons assembly teams. He was awarded the Commendation Ribbon for his service.

In December 1949, Clarke went to Okinawa as executive officer of the engineer district there. The base there was being expanded to counter the communist People's Republic of China, and a $500 million construction program (equivalent to $6765.73 million in 2025) was under way. This was accelerated after the outbreak of the Korean War in June 1950, but much of the necessary equipment and supplies was diverted to the pressing needs of operations in the Korean peninsula. He attended a four-month course at the Armed Forces Staff College in Norfolk, Virginia, and then became chief of the Atomic Section of the Army's Research and Development Division, under the Assistant Chief of Staff, G-4, Lieutenant General Williston B. Palmer, who made him his executive officer in April 1953. In February 1954, Clarke attended the three-month Advanced Management Program at Harvard Business School. He briefly served as head of the Construction Management Branch of G-4, where he was concerned with the funding, manufacture and emplacement of Nike missile batteries. He then became head of the Production Mobilization Branch, with responsibility for the readiness of the national munitions and armament industries, and was special assistant to Palmer's successor, Lieutenant General Carter B. Magruder. He attended the National War College in 1956 and 1957.

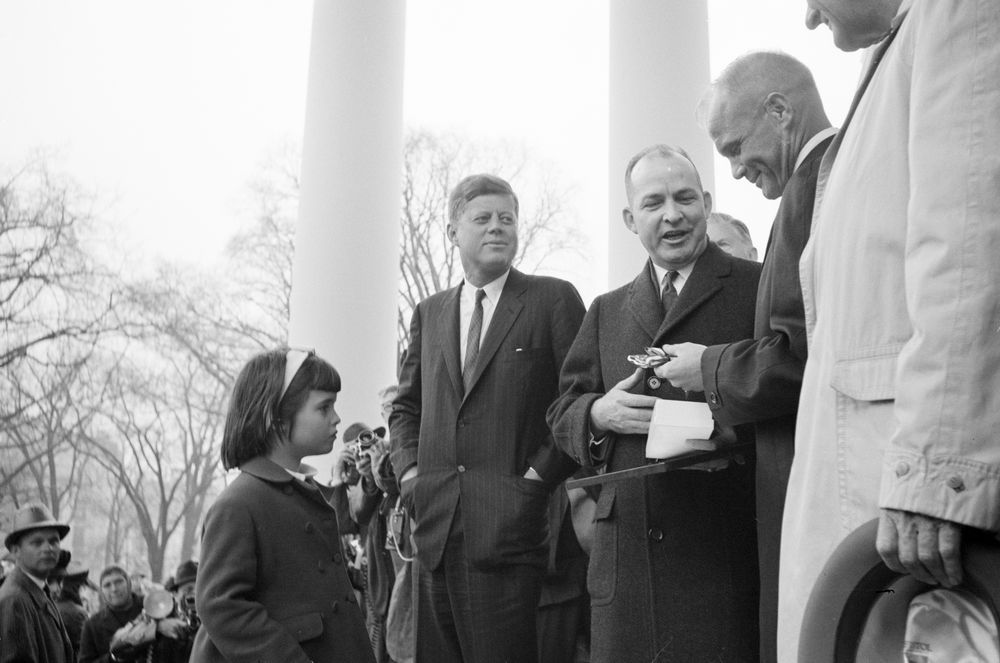
In his role of Engineer Commissioner of the District of Columbia, Clarke hands astronaut John Glenn the key to the city at a White House Reception

Clarke's last overseas assignment was as district engineer of the Trans-East District from 1957 to 1959. From his headquarters at Karachi in Pakistan, he oversaw U.S. military construction in Pakistan and Saudi Arabia, and initiated transportation surveys in East Pakistan and Burma. He oversaw $140 million worth of military construction programs (equivalent to $1604.86 million in 2025) in Pakistan alone. Works included Karachi Airport and Dhahran Airport in Saudi Arabia, and design studies for road from Rangoon to Mandalay in Burma, all in support of United States Air Force (USAF) spy flights over the Soviet Union. On returning to the United States in 1959, her served for a year as chief of staff of the United States Army Engineer Training Center at Fort Leonard Wood, Missouri.

From 1874 to 1967, the District of Columbia was governed by three federally appointed commissioners (one a civil engineer, selected from the Army Corps of Engineers). On 1 August 1960, President Dwight D. Eisenhower appointed Clarke as the District's Engineer Commissioner. He was the technician-in-chief, called to address the problems such as traffic gridlock, economic development and low levels of funding. At one point early in his term, he was the only commissioner available for full-time duty, because one post was vacant and the other commissioner had suffered a heart attack. In the early 1960s, he participated in talks that led to the compact agreement for construction of the Washington Metro railway and subway system. As chairman of the District's zoning commission, he participated in early debates over the controversial proposal to build an interstate bridge near the Three Sisters Islands in the Potomac River, and over a planned freeway through the heart of the District.

After his term as Engineer Commissioner ended on 8 July 1963, he was the Director of Military Construction in the Office of the Chief of Engineers from 1963 to 1964. In this role he handled the military construction programs of the Army and the USAF. The USAF construction program mainly involved building missile silos for the new intercontinental ballistic missiles. He was also involved with the development of the Kennedy Space Center in Florida for NASA, and $75 million (equivalent to $788.72 million in 2025) of Agency for International Development projects in the Middle East and Africa. He mounted the disaster relief effort after the 1964 Alaska earthquake because a Corps of Engineers officer was the man on the spot.

In July 1965, Clarke became the commanding General of the Army Engineer Center and Commandant of the United States Army Engineer School at Fort Belvoir. With the escalation of the Vietnam War, he supervised the training of engineer units for duty in Vietnam. He established a ten-month training course to prepare field officers for command at the battalion level and for duty on staffs of divisions and higher formations. Shorter courses were created to turn out platoon commanders, and he re-established the Officer Candidate School there to turn qualified enlisted personnel into junior officers. Now a major general, he was appointed the Deputy Chief of Engineers in December 1966. During his tour of duty, he was principally concerned with engineer activities in support of the war in Vietnam. On 1 August 1969, he became the Chief of Engineers, with the rank of lieutenant general. His office had an annual budget of $1.8 billion (equivalent to $15.8 billion in 2025) for civil engineering works in the United States and $1 billion (equivalent to $8.78 billion in 2025) for military construction. Clarke guided the Corps of Engineers as it devoted increased attention to the environmental impact of its work. He was awarded the Distinguished Service Medal and was elected to the National Academy of Engineering in 1973.

When Clarke retired from the Army on 1 July 1973 after 36 years of service, he was the last member of the West Point class of 1937 on active duty.

== Later life ==
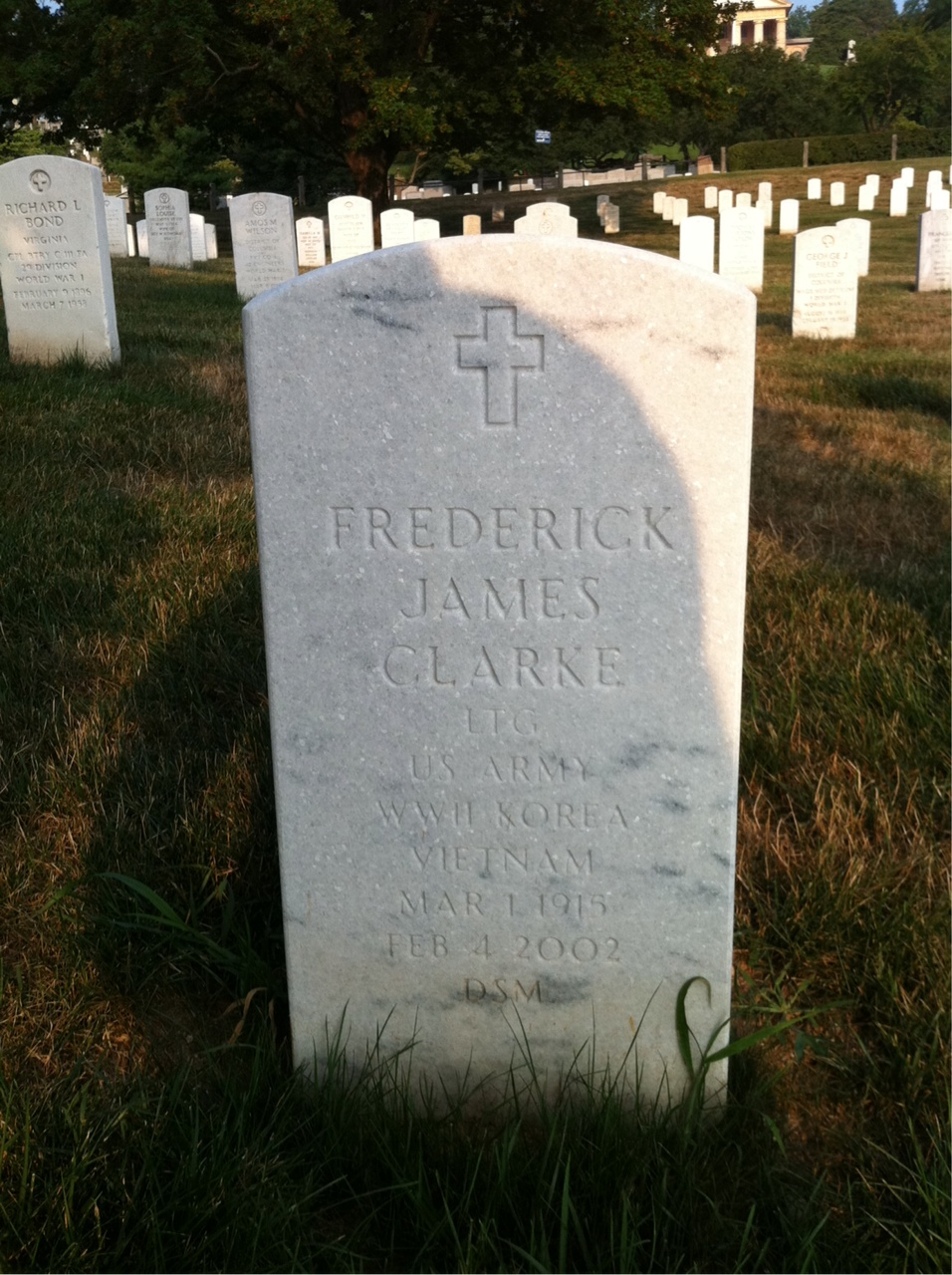
Grave in Arlington National Cemetery

After leaving the Army, Clarke served as executive director of the National Commission on Water Quality. In the 1980s, he was a consultant to the Tippetts, Abbett, McCarthy, Stratton engineering firm. He died in Fort Belvoir, Virginia, on 4 February 2002, and was buried in Arlington National Cemetery.

== Dates of rank ==
Insignia	Rank	Component	Date	Reference
	Second Lieutenant	United States Army Corps of Engineers	12 June 1937	
	First Lieutenant	United States Army Corps of Engineers	12 June 1940	
	Captain	Army of the United States	9 September 1940	
	Major	Army of the United States	1 February 1942	
	Lieutenant Colonel	Army of the United States	22 December 1942	
	Colonel	Army of the United States	15 May 1945	
	Lieutenant Colonel (reverted)	Army of the United States	1 June 1946	
	Captain	United States Army Corps of Engineers	12 June 1947	
	Major	United States Army Corps of Engineers	15 July 1948	
	Colonel	Army of the United States	29 June 1951	
	Lieutenant Colonel	United States Army Corps of Engineers	1 July 1954	
	Brigadier general (temporary)	United States Army	1 December 1960	
	Brigadier general	United States Army	12 June 1962	
	Major general (temporary)	United States Army	February 1965	
	Major general	United States Army	22 August 1967	
	Lieutenant general	United States Army	1 August 1969	
	Lieutenant general	Retired	1 July 1973	

== Notes ==
Military offices
Preceded by William F. Cassidy	Chief of Engineers; 1969–1973	Succeeded by William C. Gribble, Jr.
