= Christian Febiger =

American Revolutionary War commander

Hans Christian Febiger
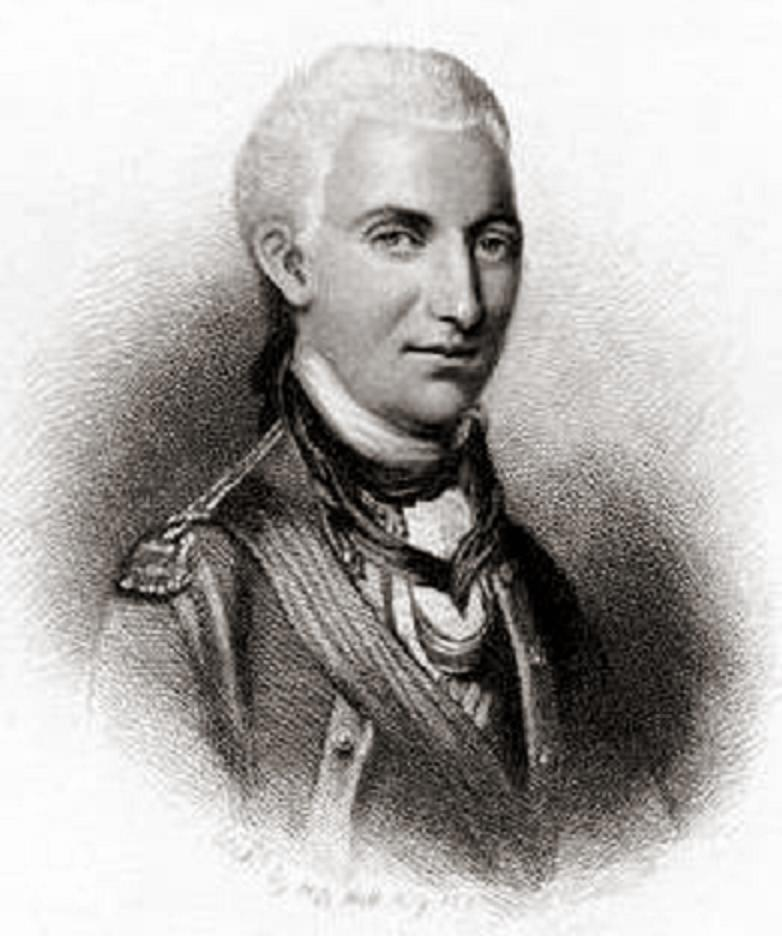
- Engraving by H.B. Hall
- Born: October 19, 1749; Faaborg, Funen, Denmark-Norway
- Died: September 20, 1796 (aged 46); Philadelphia, Pennsylvania, US
- Resting place: Mount Vernon Cemetery

Hans Christian Febiger (or Fibiger) (October 19, 1749, in Fåborg, Denmark-Norway – September 20, 1796, in Philadelphia, Pennsylvania) was an American Revolutionary War commander, confidant of General George Washington, and original member of the Society of the Cincinnati. Known by the moniker "Old Denmark", Febiger also served as treasurer of Pennsylvania from November 13, 1789, until his death.

== Early life ==
Hans Christian Febiger (born Fibiger) was born in Faaborg on the island of Funen in Denmark. He was the son of organist Jørgen Mathiasen Fibiger and Sophie Dorthea Pedersdatter Østrup. After receiving the Studentereksamen, he journeyed with his uncle, Henrik Jakob Fibiger, sometime in the late 1760s, to the Danish possession of Saint Croix, where the latter had been appointed customs duty manager. In 1772 Febiger traveled to the American colonies (possibly New England) and was engaged in several businesses when the American Revolution started. Following the Lexington Alarm, Febiger joined the Massachusetts Militia on April 28, 1775, where he fell under the command of Samuel Gerrish and soon became adjutant.

== Revolutionary War service ==
Febiger next became engaged in the Battle of Bunker Hill and proved a capable commander at several battles throughout New England. Febiger was soon afterward appointed to accompany General Benedict Arnold on his Quebec Expedition, which eventually led to the infamous Battle of Quebec. During the raid on December 31, 1775, Febiger was taken prisoner by the British and held captive in and around New York City until January 1777. After his release, Febiger rejoined the Continental forces as the lieutenant colonel of the 11th Virginia Regiment under the command of Col. Daniel Morgan.

Febiger and his regiment fought with the Continental Army in the Philadelphia campaign before moving on to other engagements. Following his performance at the Battle of Brandywine, Febiger was promoted to the rank of colonel on September 26, 1777, and took command of the 2nd Virginia Regiment, a post he held until the end of the war (though it is speculated that he did not accept his colonelcy until after the battle of Germantown).

In later parts of the American Revolutionary War Col. Febiger commanded the 2nd Virginia Regiment through several significant battles. He also fought with Major General Nathanael Greene at Germantown on the right wing, led 4,000 men with two canon at the Battle of Monmouth, and commanded the right column in the Battle of Stony Point, where he distinguished himself by taking the British commander prisoner in person.

Febiger later served under General Peter Muhlenberg as a recruiting coordinator for the state of Virginia and oversaw much of the shipment of supplies through the battle lines after being removed to Philadelphia. As in most of his military service, Febiger distinguished himself as master of the stores and transport of much of the Continental supply.

Febiger's military career for much of the rest of the war involved recruiting and oversight efforts; however, he was in the field at intervals and present at the Battle of Yorktown and the official surrender of General Cornwallis. Febiger is cited in a February 20, 1942, Ripley's Believe It or Not! feature as having been the "only soldier who took part in every important battle of the Revolutionary War from Bunker Hill to Yorktown".

Colonel Febiger finally retired from active duty, following eight years of service to the Revolutionary cause, on January 1, 1783. He was officially discharged from the Continental Army on November 30. During that period, the Continental Congress conferred on Febiger the rank of brigadier general by brevet. Febiger, however, never truly assumed that title, saying that it was "more to one's business advantage in America to be known as 'Colonel'".

== Later life ==
Following the war, he settled in Philadelphia and engaged in several business ventures, many of which proved rather successful. Febiger also joined the Virginia branch of the Society of the Cincinnati, but later switched his affiliation to the Pennsylvania group. After briefly serving as auctioneer of the Northern Liberties of Philadelphia (succeeding David Rittenhouse), he eventually came to hold the post of state treasurer for the Commonwealth of Pennsylvania and was appointed to that post for every successive year until he died in 1796. According to the Sons of the American Revolution, Pennsylvania Society, Febiger is buried in the historic Mount Vernon Cemetery in Philadelphia.

== Family ==
Febiger was married to the former Elizabeth Carson (1750–1817), and though they had no issue by this marriage, they adopted Mrs. Febiger's nephew, Christian Carson Febiger (son of John Carson, a trustee of the University of Pennsylvania). Febiger was the grandfather of the Civil War admiral John Carson Febiger, who later became commandant of the Washington Navy Yard and is buried in Arlington National Cemetery.

Political offices
Preceded by David Rittenhouse	Treasurer of Pennsylvania; 1789–1797	Succeeded by Peter Baynton
