= Max W. Noah =

United States Army general

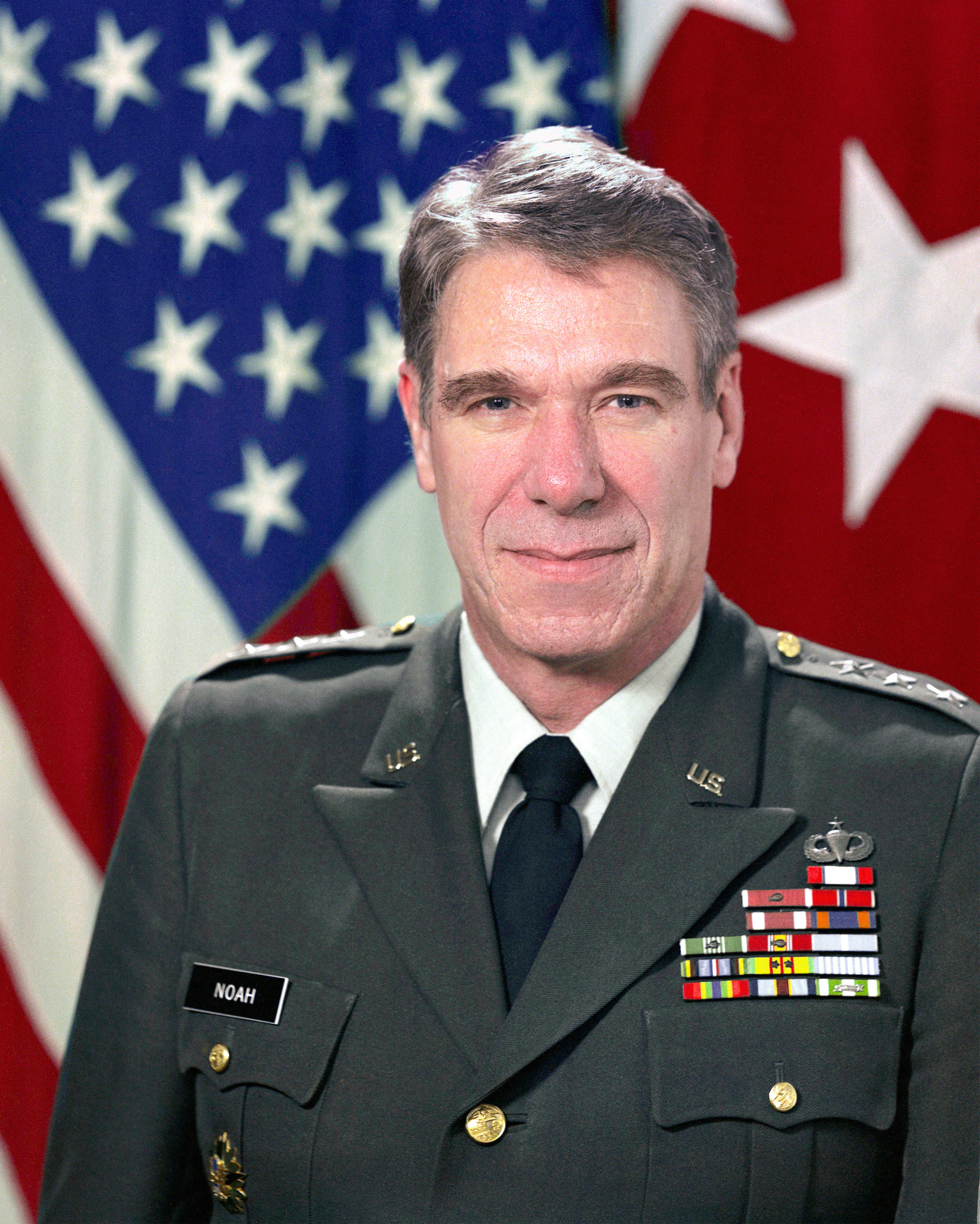
- Noah in 1985
- Born: February 19, 1932; Greensboro, North Carolina, U.S.
- Died: June 15, 2018 (aged 86); Fort Belvoir, Virginia, U.S.
- Burial place: West Point, New York, U.S. United States Military Academy Cemetery
- Spouse: Priscilla Treat Van Sickler Noah
- Military career
- Allegiance: United States
- Branch: United States Army; Corps of Engineers and Finance Corps
- Service years: 1953–1988
- Rank: Lieutenant General
- Commands: Huntsville Division, U.S. Army Corps of Engineers; United States Army Engineering School, Fort Belvior, VA; Saint Paul District, U.S. Army Corps of Engineers; 2nd Engineer Group, 8th Army, South Korea; 307th Engineer Battalion, 82nd Airborne Division, Fort Bragg, NC
- Battles/wars: Korean War; Vietnam War
- Awards: Distinguished Service Medal (2); Legion of Merit (2); Bronze Star Medal; Meritorious Service Medal; Air Medal

Max Wilbur Noah (February 19, 1932 – June 15, 2018) was a lieutenant general in the United States Army. He served as Comptroller of the United States Army from 1984 to 1988 and Commander of the United States Army Engineer School from 1980 to 1982.

Noah was born in Greensboro, North Carolina and raised in Georgia. He graduated from the Georgia Military College high school in 1948 and then studied engineering at Georgia Tech for a year before being appointed to the United States Military Academy. Noah graduated from West Point with a B.S. degree in 1953 and was commissioned in the Army Corps of Engineers. He served as a platoon leader with the 74th Engineer Battalion, 3rd Infantry Division in Korea.

In 1958, Noah earned an M.S.E. degree in electrical engineering from Purdue University. He then taught electrical engineering and nuclear physics at West Point until 1962. Noah graduated from the Command and General Staff College in 1965 and the Army War College in 1970.

After retiring from the Army on June 30, 1988, Noah settled in Alexandria, Virginia. He died at Fort Belvoir, Virginia and was buried at the West Point Cemetery on September 27, 2018.
