= William F. Cassidy =

United States Army general (1908–2002)

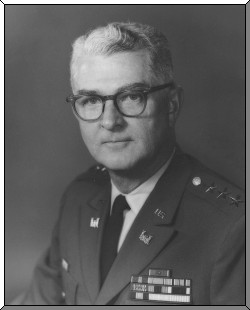
- Lieutenant General William F. Cassidy
- Born: August 28, 1908; Nome, Alaska, United States
- Died: March 31, 2002 (aged 93) Orlando, Florida, United States
- Allegiance: United States of America
- Branch: United States Army
- Service years: 1931–1969
- Rank: Lieutenant General
- Commands: Chief of Engineers (1965–1969)
- Awards: Distinguished Service Medal; Legion of Merit (2); Bronze Star

William Frederick Cassidy (August 28, 1908 – March 31, 2002) was a commanding officer in the United States Army during and after World War II.

== Military career ==
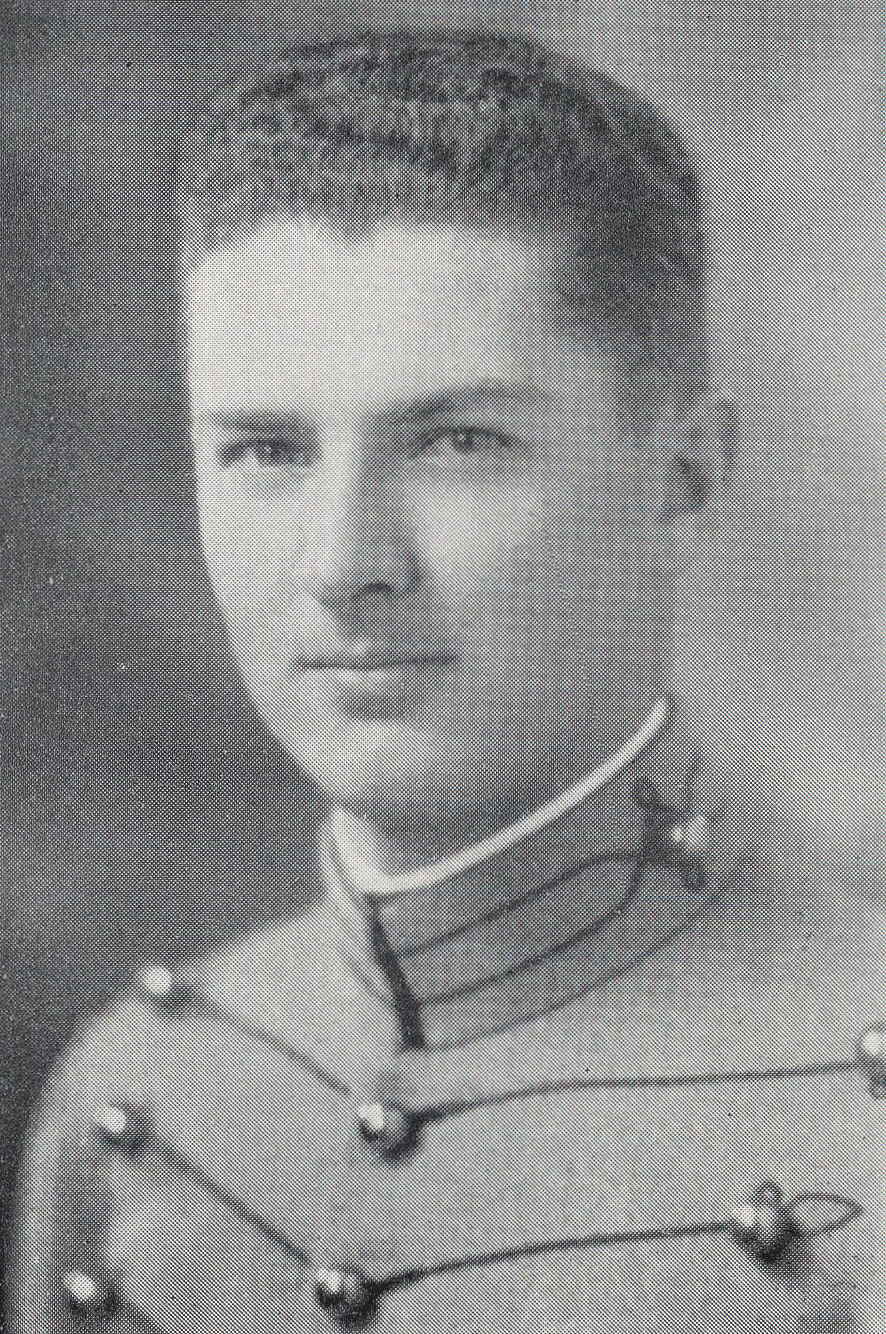
Cassidy as a United States Military Academy cadet c. 1931

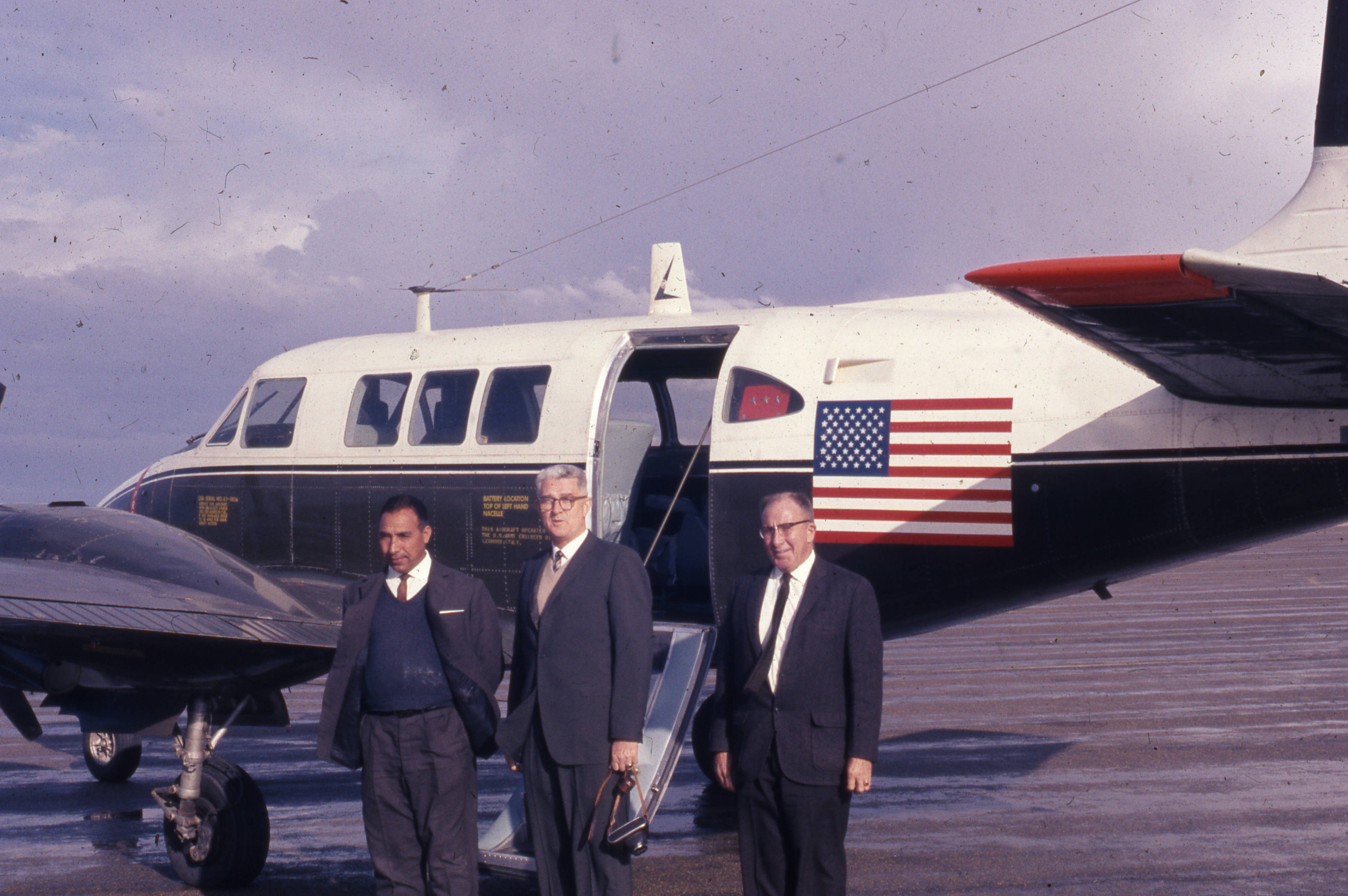
Cassidy at Herat International Airport, 1967 (center)

Cassidy won an appointment to the United States Military Academy at West Point. He graduated in 1931, after which he attended the University of Iowa, where he received a MS degree in Mechanics and Hydraulics. After graduation he was commissioned in the United States Army Corps of Engineers. He served as assistant to the District Engineer in Portland, Oregon; commanded an engineer company at Fort Belvoir, Virginia; and oversaw military construction projects in Hawaii. During World War II Cassidy commanded engineer troops specializing in airfield construction in England, North Africa, and Italy. He was Deputy Chief, then Chief, War Plans (later Operations and Training) Division, Office of the Chief of Engineers, in 1944–47. At the outbreak of the Korean War, he was ordered to Japan where he was responsible for engineer supply. He served as South Pacific Division Engineer from 1955 to 1958 and was the senior logistics advisor to the Republic of Korea Army in 1958–59. Cassidy was the Corps' Director of Civil Works from September 1959 to March 1962 and was then appointed Deputy Chief of Engineers. On March 1, 1963, he became the Commanding General of the Army Engineer Center and Fort Belvoir and Commandant of the Army Engineer School. Cassidy became Chief of Engineers on July 1, 1965.

== Awards and decorations ==
Cassidy received the Distinguished Service Medal for his service as Chief of Engineers. Other military decorations included the Legion of Merit with Oak Leaf Cluster, the Bronze Star and the Republic of Korea Presidential Unit Citation.

- Army Distinguished Service Medal
- Legion of Merit with oak leaf cluster
- Bronze Star
- South Korean Presidential Unit Citation

== Personal life ==
Cassidy met Helen Robinson, an art teacher in Ames, Iowa, while he taught ROTC there. They were married in 1939. They had two daughters, Anne and Mary.

Cassidy died in Florida at age 93. He was survived by his wife, daughters, five grandchildren, and two great-grandchildren.

== See also ==
Military offices
Preceded by Walter K. Wilson Jr.	Chief of Engineers; 1965-1969	Succeeded by Frederick J. Clarke
