= Clair F. Gill =

United States Army general

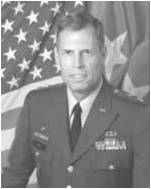
- Born: July 7, 1943 (age 82); Johnstown, Pennsylvania, U.S.
- Allegiance: United States of America
- Branch: United States Army
- Service years: 1965–1999
- Rank: Major general
- Commands: U.S. Army Engineer School

Clair F. Gill (born July 7, 1943) is a retired United States Army major general who served as Commandant of the U.S. Army Engineer School.
