= Douglas Lafayette Weart =

US Army general (1891–1975)

Douglas L. Weart
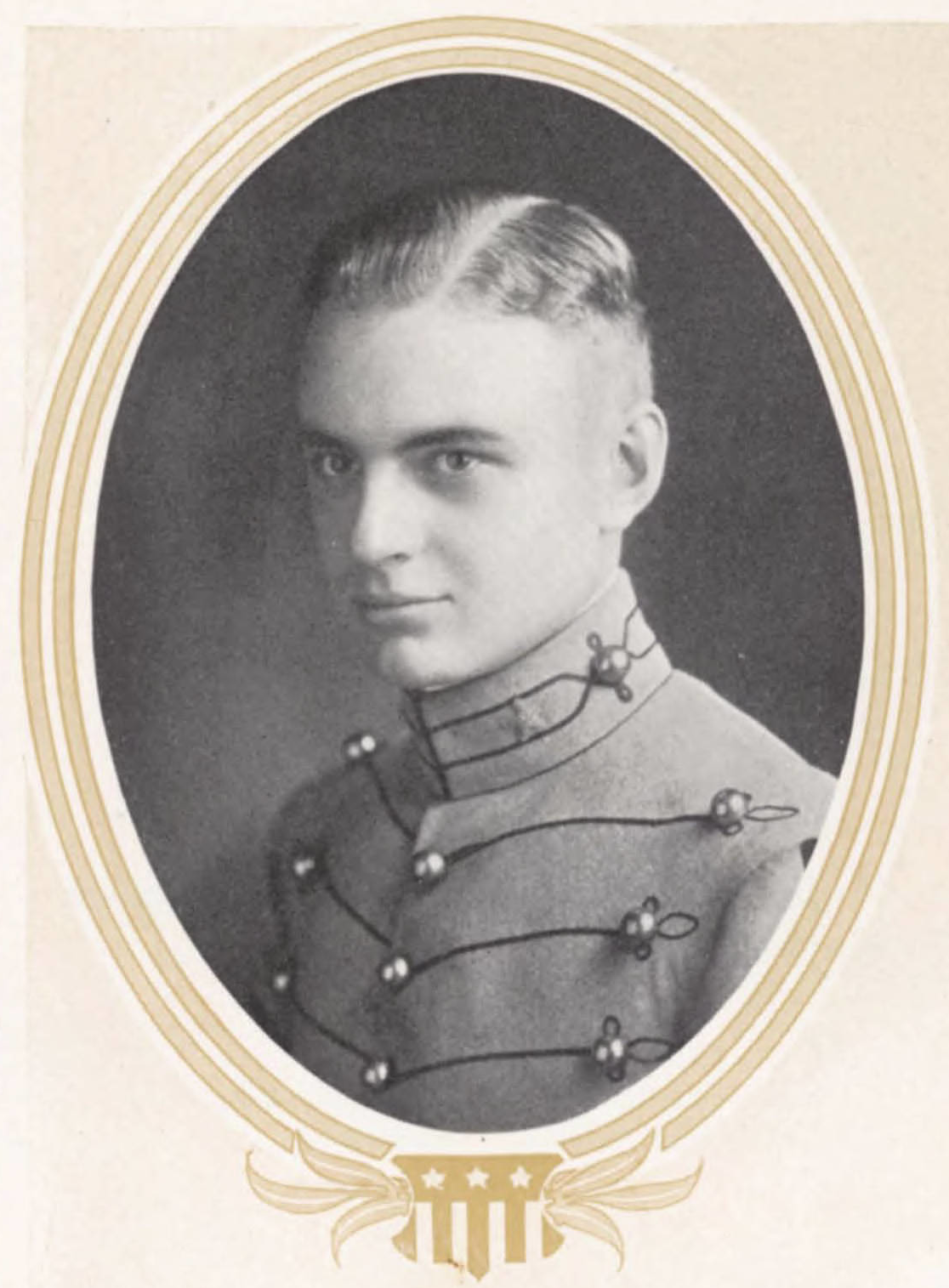
- At West Point in 1915
- Born: August 10, 1891
- Died: April 5, 1975 (aged 83); Washington, D.C.
- Burial place: Arlington National Cemetery
- Military career
- Allegiance: United States
- Branch: United States Army
- Service years: 1915–1951
- Rank: Major general
- Service number: O-25569
- Conflicts: World War II
- Awards: Distinguished Service Medal; Legion of Merit

Douglas Lafayette Weart (August 10, 1891 – April 5, 1975) was an American major general and a two-time recipient of the Legion of Merit and one Distinguished Service Medal.

He attended the Army War College from 1938 to 1939.

He died at Walter Reed Army Medical Center on April 5, 1975, and was buried at Arlington National Cemetery.
