= Daniel R. Schroeder =

United States Army general

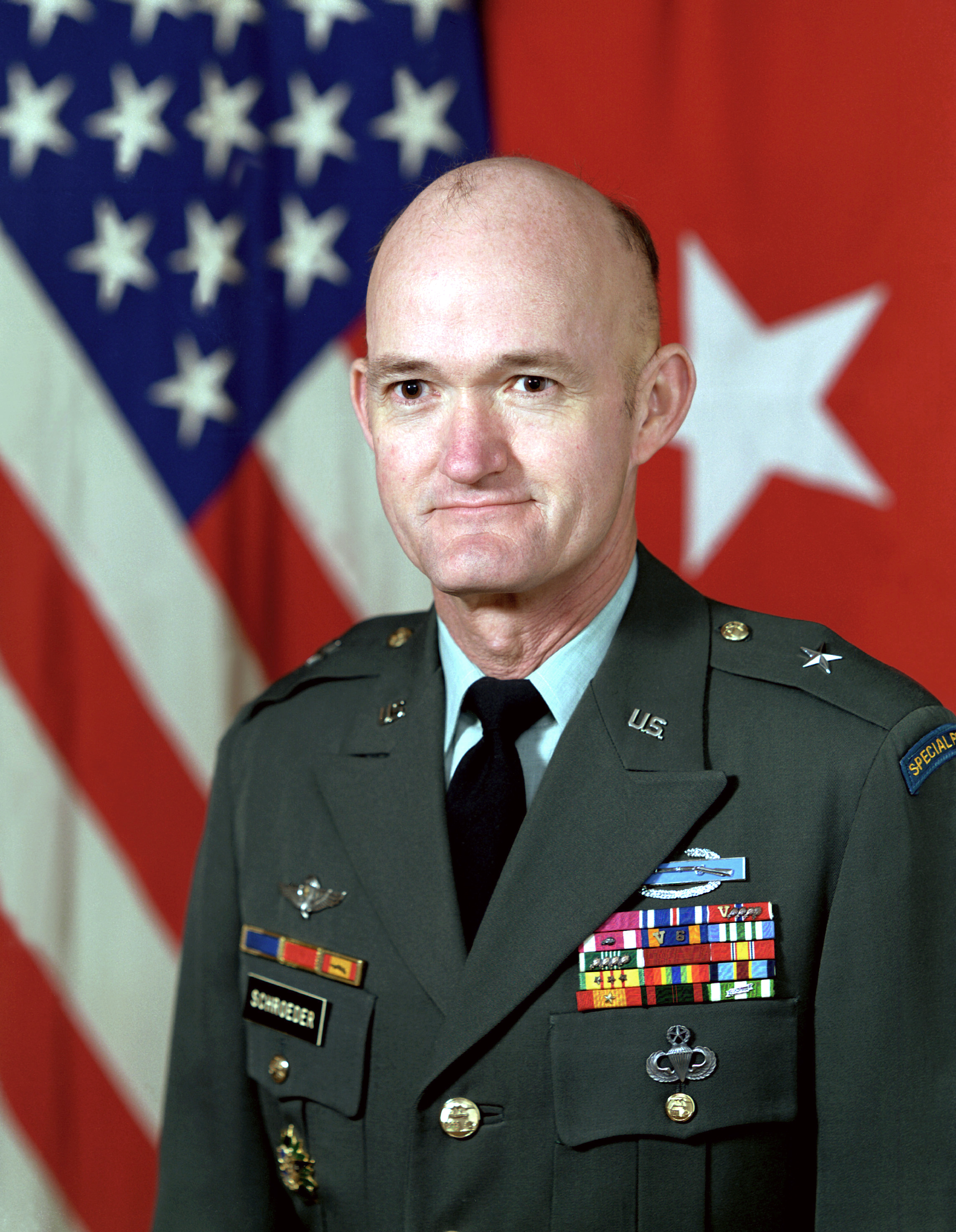
- Schroeder as a brigadier general, 1986
- Born: March 13, 1938 (age 88); Jamaica, New York, U.S.
- Allegiance: United States of America
- Branch: United States Navy (1955–1961); United States Army (1961–1995)
- Service years: 1955–1995
- Rank: Lieutenant General
- Commands: Deputy Commander in Chief, United States Army Europe and Seventh Army; 20th Engineer Brigade (Combat); 307th Engineer Battalion (Airborne)

Daniel Richard Schroeder (born March 13, 1938) is a retired United States Army lieutenant general who served as Deputy Commander in Chief, United States Army Europe and Seventh Army.

Schroeder enlisted in the United States Navy in December 1955. Appointed to the United States Naval Academy in 1957, he graduated in 1961 with a B.S. degree in engineering and was commissioned as a second lieutenant in the Army Corps of Engineers. Schroeder later earned an M.S. degree in systems management from the Air Force Institute of Technology.

Schroeder commanded at all levels from platoon through Joint Task Force and has extensive experience in strategic planning, resource management/allocation, and operations research and systems analysis. As the Deputy Commander of the U.S. Army in Europe, Schroeder supervised 14 separate organizations with an operating budget over $1.5 billion and 29,467 personnel. Schroeder was the principal executive at the Department of the Army responsible for developing options and priorities to govern resource allocation decisions. From 1988 to 1991, he commanded the U.S. Army Engineer School at Ft. Leonard Wood, Missouri, training 32,000 soldiers annually, providing curriculum and professional schooling for Army Engineer officers and non-commissioned officers. As the Army's Program Manager for the development of Fort Drum, he developed the program for, and obtained approval of, the Army's $1.4 billion expansion/modernization of Fort Drum. He conceived innovative and unprecedented approaches to capitalize the facilities involving the private sector as well as state and federal agencies. In addition to being Chief of Staff of the XVIIIth Airborne Corps and the 24th Infantry Division, earlier assignments include being a Resident Engineer in Germany, a Special Forces Detachment Commander in Southeast Asia, as well as senior staff officer in major commands in the United States and overseas. Schroeder served in Rwanda prior to retiring from the military. Subsequent to retirement from the Army, Schroeder was the Senior Vice President and General Manager for Modeling, Simulation, and Training for LORAL Federal Systems and later Lockheed Martin Information Systems. He is currently a consultant with several American corporations.
