= William M. Hoge =

United States Army general (1894–1979)

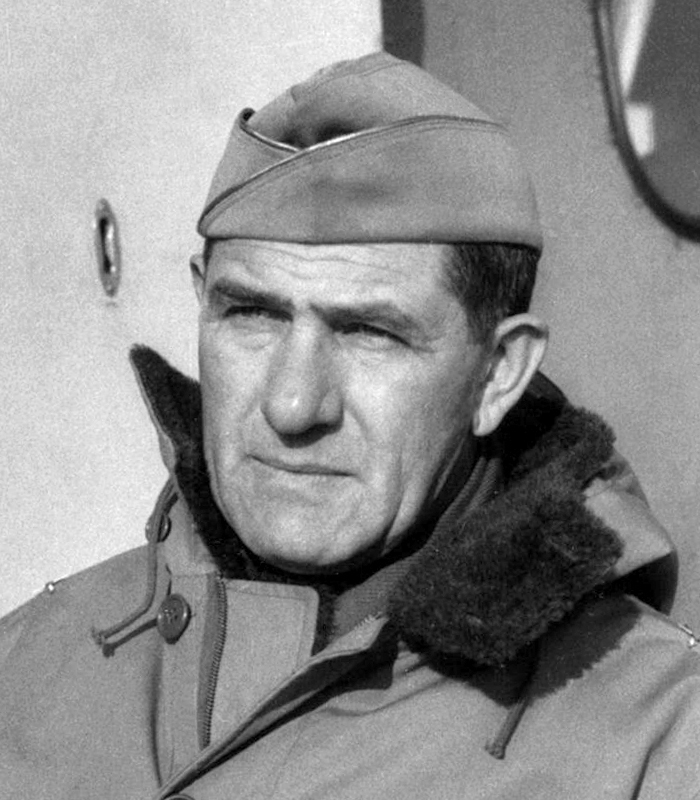
- Brigadier General Hoge directing the construction of the ALCAN Highway in 1942
- Born: 13 January 1894; Boonville, Missouri, US
- Died: 29 October 1979 (aged 85); Fort Leavenworth, Kansas, US
- Burial place: Arlington National Cemetery
- Military career
- Allegiance: United States
- Branch: United States Army
- Service years: 1916–1955
- Rank: General
- Service number: 0-4437
- Unit: Corps of Engineers
- Commands: United States Army Europe; Seventh Army; Fourth Army; IX Corps; 4th Armored Division
- Conflicts: World War I World War II; Korean War
- Awards: Distinguished Service Cross; Army Distinguished Service Medal (3); Silver Star (2); Legion of Merit; Bronze Star; Purple Heart; Air Medal
- Other work: Chairman of the Board, Interlake Iron Corporation

General William Morris Hoge (13 January 1894 – 29 October 1979) was a highly decorated senior United States Army officer who fought with distinction in World War I, World War II, and the Korean War, with a military career spanning nearly 40 years.

== Early life and military career ==
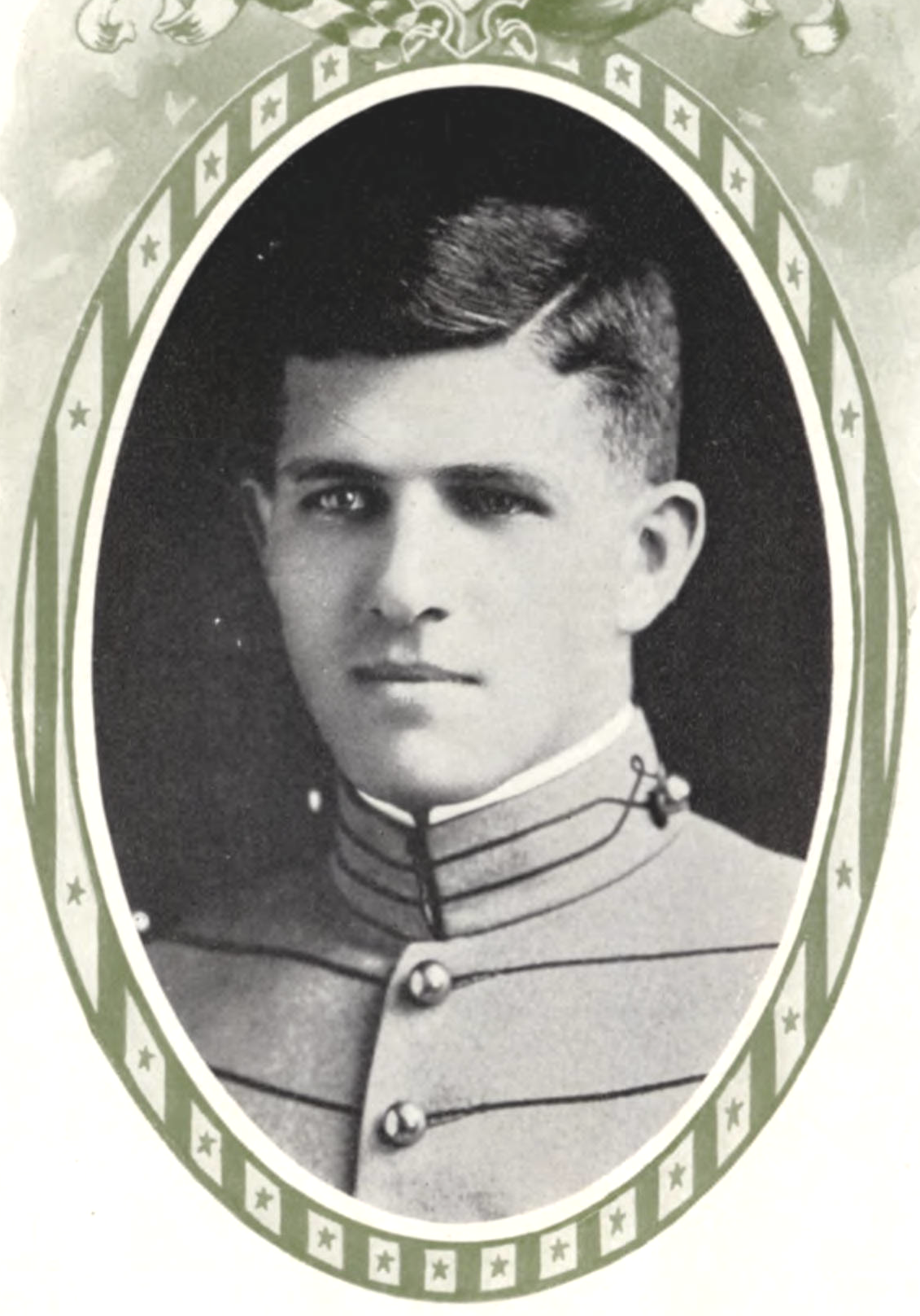
At West Point in 1916

William M. Hoge was born on the campus of Kemper Military School in Boonville, Missouri, where his father William McGuffey Hoge served as principal. In 1905, the family moved to Lexington, Missouri, where his father bought an ownership interest and served as principal and superintendent at Wentworth Military Academy. After graduating from Wentworth in 1911 and taking a postgrad year in New York, he received an appointment to the United States Military Academy (USMA) at West Point, New York. He graduated 29th in a class of 125 in June 1916, then was commissioned into the Engineer Branch of the United States Army. His fellow graduates were men such as Wilhelm D. Styer, Dwight Johns, Thomas D. Finley, Stanley E. Reinhart, Louis E. Hibbs, Horace L. McBride, Robert Neyland, Fay B. Prickett and Calvin DeWitt Jr., all of whom would rise to the rank of brigadier general or higher in their military careers.

Hoge commanded a company of the 7th Engineer Regiment, 5th Division, at Fort Leavenworth, Kansas, from 1917 to 1918, during World War I. During the war, Hoge served overseas in France, where he received the Distinguished Service Cross personally from General John J. Pershing, commander-in-chief of the American Expeditionary Forces on the Western Front, for heroic action under fire as a battalion commander during the Meuse–Argonne offensive. The citation for his DSC reads as follows:

The President of the United States of America, authorized by Act of Congress, 9 July 1918, takes pleasure in presenting the Distinguished Service Cross to Major (Corps of Engineers) William Morris Hoge, United States Army, for extraordinary heroism in action while serving with 7th Engineers, 5th Division, A.E.F., near Brieulles, France, 4 November 1918. After personally and voluntarily reconnoitering the site of a pontoon bridge over the Meuse, in daylight and under direct shell fire, Major Hoge commanded the movement of a train of heavy wagons, under enemy observation, to this location. Major Hoge then supervised the construction of the bridge and the successful crossing of the train.

He was also awarded the Silver Star, "for gallantry in action", during the war.

During the interwar years, Hoge graduated from the Massachusetts Institute of Technology and from the United States Army Command and General Staff College.

== World War II ==
Hoge directed one of the great engineering feats of World War II, the construction of the 1,519-mile (2,450 km) ALCAN Highway in nine months. Later, in Europe, he commanded the Provisional Engineer Special Brigade Group attached directly to V Corps in the assault on Omaha Beach. One of his key men who worked under him from Alaska to England, Colonel Benjamin B. Talley, directed the planning-specifics of the invasion, using maps, air studies, even tourist photos and postcards culled from the British people to learn the topography, and designate which units would assault which sectors of the two United States beaches. Talley went ashore at Omaha in the third wave to direct Engineer operations and immediately begin to receive men by the thousands and supplies by the ton over the beach from the Communications Zone, the supply and service-forces arm of the European Theater of Operations. Hoge later directed Combat Command B of the 9th Armored Division, in its heroic actions in the Ardennes during the Battle of the Bulge, and in its celebrated capture of the Ludendorff Bridge over the Rhine River at Remagen. By war's end, Hoge was the Commanding General of the 4th Armored Division.

== Post-World War II ==
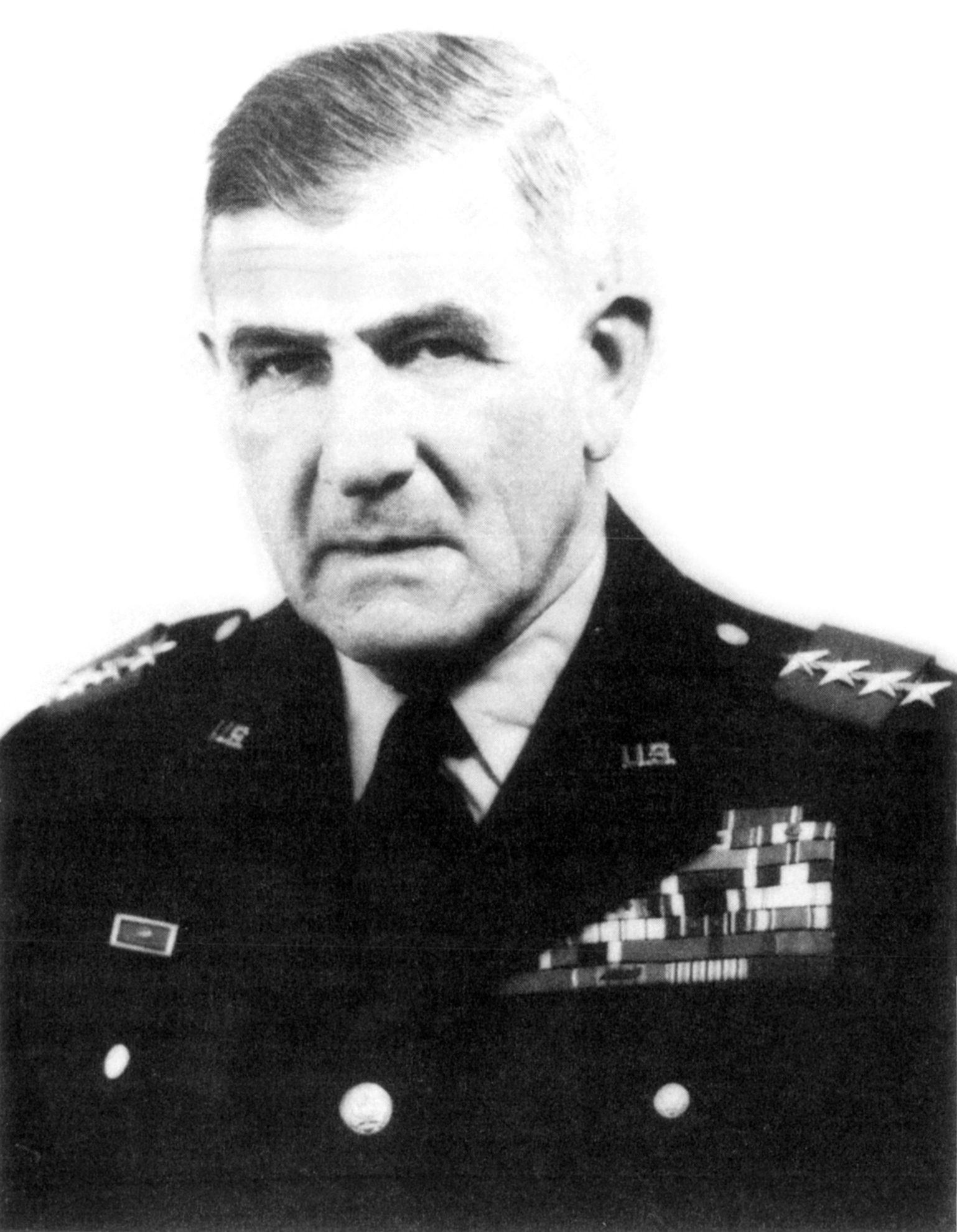
Hoge as commander-in-chief, United States Army Europe (1954)

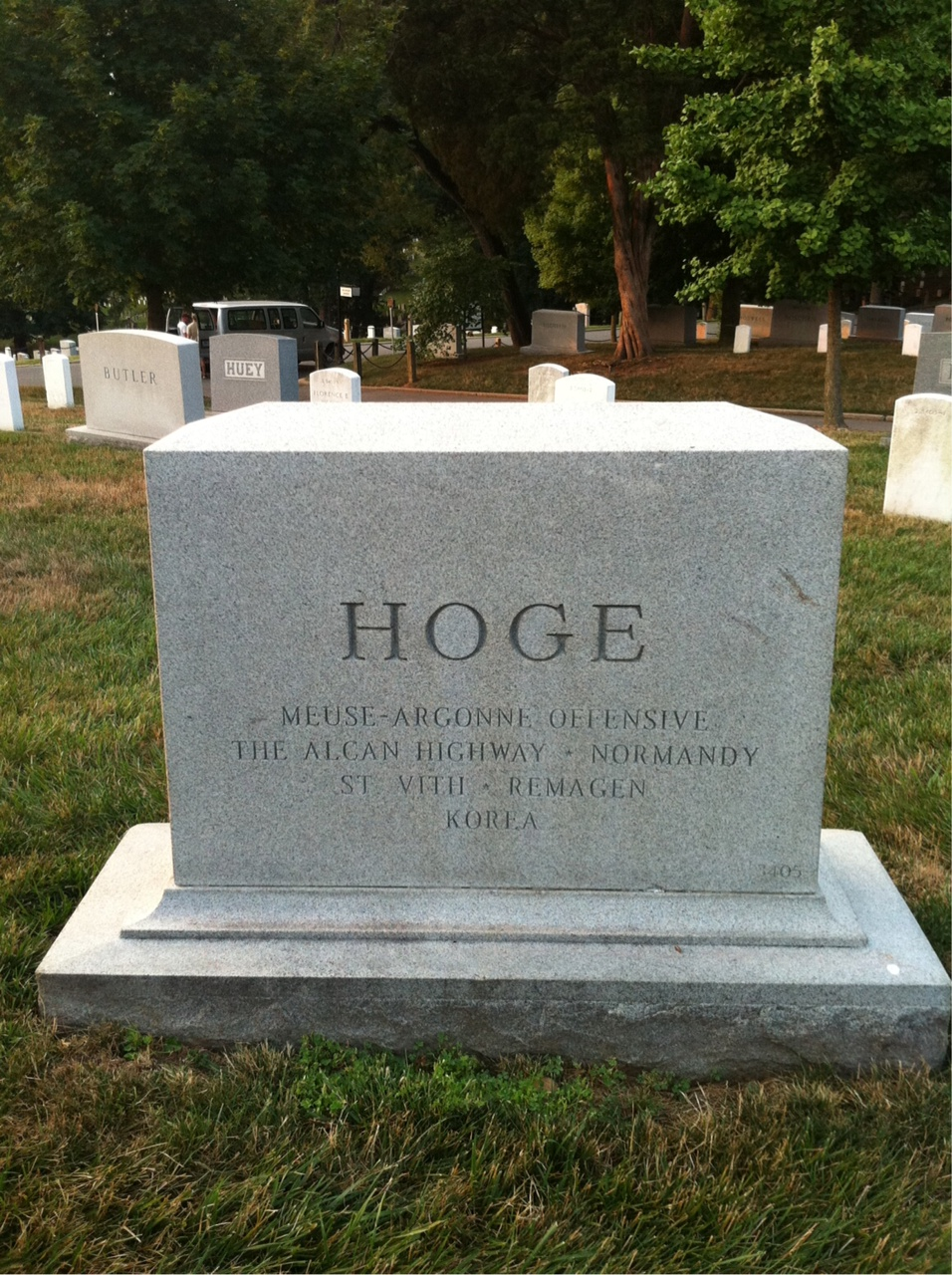
Hoge's grave at Arlington National Cemetery, with the back of the stone setting out his most notable achievements

During the Korean War, at the request of General Matthew Ridgway, the Eighth United States Army commander, Hoge commanded the IX Corps in 1951. Hoge achieved his senior command in the army as commander-in-chief of United States Army Europe. Hoge was promoted to major general in May 1945, lieutenant general in June 1951, and full general on 23 October 1953.

Hoge retired from active duty in January 1955 to his hometown of Lexington, Missouri, then turned to the private sector as chairman of the board of Interlake Steel. Hoge moved to his son's farm in Kansas in October 1975 and he died suddenly on 29 October 1979, at Munson Army Hospital, Fort Leavenworth, Kansas. He was buried at Arlington National Cemetery.

== In popular culture ==
In the 1969 film The Bridge at Remagen, the character of Brigadier General Shinner (played by E. G. Marshall) was based on Hoge.

== Awards and decorations ==
His awards and decorations include:

1st Row	Distinguished Service Cross		Army Distinguished Service Medal with two Oak Leaf Clusters	
2nd Row	Silver Star with two Oak Leaf Clusters	Legion of Merit	Bronze Star Medal	Air Medal
3rd Row	Army Commendation Medal	Purple Heart	Mexican Border Service Medal	World War I Victory Medal with three Battle Clasps
4th Row	Army of Occupation of Germany Medal	American Defense Service Medal	American Campaign Medal	European-African-Middle Eastern Campaign Medal with silver service star and Arrowhead device
5th Row	Asiatic-Pacific Campaign Medal	World War II Victory Medal	Army of Occupation Medal	National Defense Service Medal
6th Row	Korean Service Medal with four service stars	Honorary Companion of the Order of the Bath (United Kingdom)	Distinguished Service Order (United Kingdom)	Officer of the Legion of Honour (France)
7th Row	Commander of the Order of the Crown (Belgium)	Commander of the Military Order of Italy	Commander of the Order of Military Merit (Brazil)	Czechoslovak War Cross 1939-1945
8th Row	Order of the Patriotic War First Class (Union of Soviet Socialist Republics)	Korean Order of Military Merit, 1st Class	French Croix de guerre 1939–1945 with Palm	United Nations Korea Medal

Hoge Barracks, the transient housing operation at Fort Leavenworth, is named in his honor.

Military offices
Preceded by Hugh Joseph Gaffey	Commanding General 4th Armored Division; March 1945 – June 1945	Succeeded by Bruce C. Clarke
Preceded by Oliver P. Smith	Commanding General IX Corps; 1950–1951	Succeeded by Willard G. Wyman
Preceded by Jonathan Wainwright	Commanding General Fourth Army; 1952–1953	Succeeded by LeRoy Lutes
Preceded by Charles L. Bolte	Commanding General Seventh Army; April – September 1953	Succeeded by Anthony McAuliffe
Preceded by Charles L. Bolte	Commanding General United States Army Europe; 1953–1955	Succeeded by Anthony McAuliffe
