= Wilhelm D. Styer =

United States Army general (1893–1975)

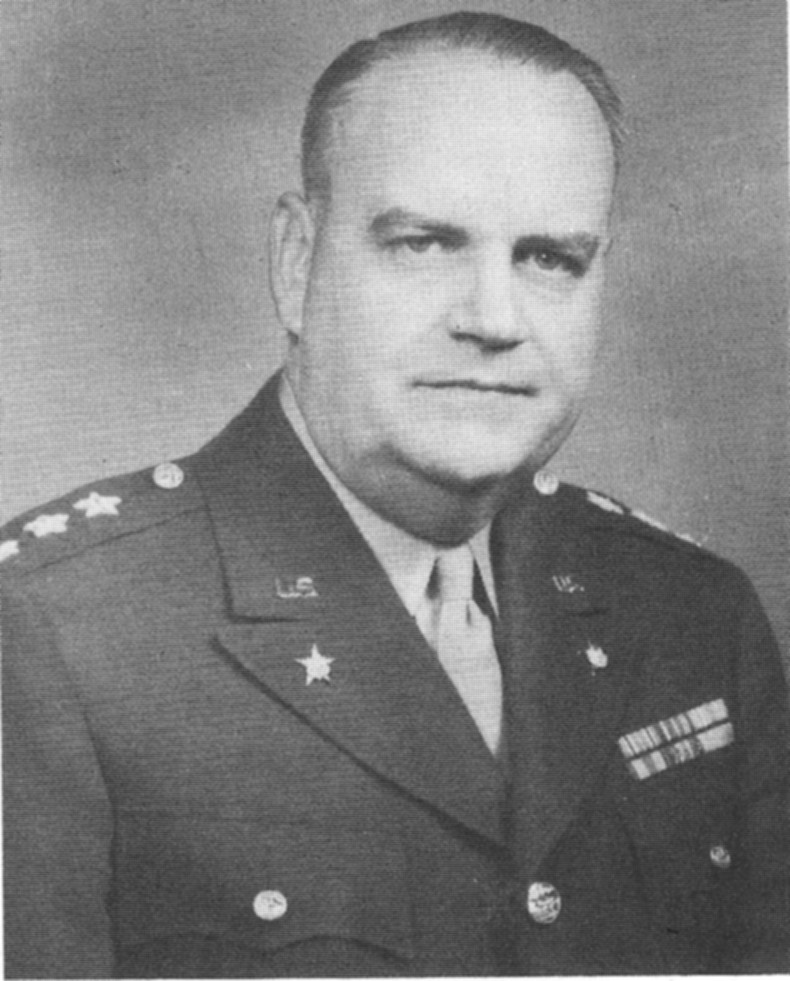
- Born: 22 July 1893; Salt Lake City, Utah
- Died: 26 February 1975 (aged 81); Coronado, California
- Burial place: Arlington National Cemetery
- Military career
- Allegiance: United States of America
- Branch: United States Army
- Service years: 1916–1947
- Rank: Lieutenant General
- Service number: 0–4415
- Commands: US Army Forces; Western Pacific
- Conflicts: Pancho Villa Expedition World War I: Third Battle of the Aisne; Battle of Château-Thierry; Aisne-Marne offensive; World War II: China Burma India Theater; Southwest Pacific Theater
- Awards: Distinguished Service Medal (2); Distinguished Service Star (Philippines); Knight Commander of the Order of the British Empire (UK)

Wilhelm Delp Styer (22 July 1893 – 26 February 1975) was a lieutenant general in the United States Army during World War II. A graduate of the United States Military Academy at West Point with the class of 1916, he was commissioned into the United States Army Corps of Engineers and served with the Pancho Villa Expedition and on the Western Front of World War I. Between the wars he obtained a degree in civil engineering from the Massachusetts Institute of Technology. He was executive officer and assistant district engineer of the New York Engineer District.

During World War II, Styer was deputy commander of the Construction Division in the Quartermaster Corps and later the Corps of Engineers. In March 1942, he became the chief of staff of the Services of Supply. He became deputy commanding general of the Army Service Forces in August 1943, as the Services of Supply was renamed. In this capacity he served on the Military Policy Committee, which oversaw the Manhattan Project.

In May 1945, Styer became the commanding general of Army Forces, Western Pacific. As such, he chaired the tribunal that tried and convicted Generals Tomoyuki Yamashita and Masaharu Homma for war crimes. He retired in 1947.

== Early life ==
Wilhelm Delp Styer was born on 22 July 1893, in Salt Lake City, Utah. He was the son of Brigadier General Henry Delp Styer, a graduate of the United States Military Academy at West Point class of 1884, who led U.S. troops in Siberia at end of World War I. His mother Bessie née Wilkes was the granddaughter of the Rear Admiral Charles Wilkes, the Antarctic explorer. He had a brother, Charles Wilkes Styer Sr., who later became a rear admiral, and a sister, Katherine Elizabeth "Bess" Styer, who married Adrian Melvin Hurst, who also became a rear admiral.

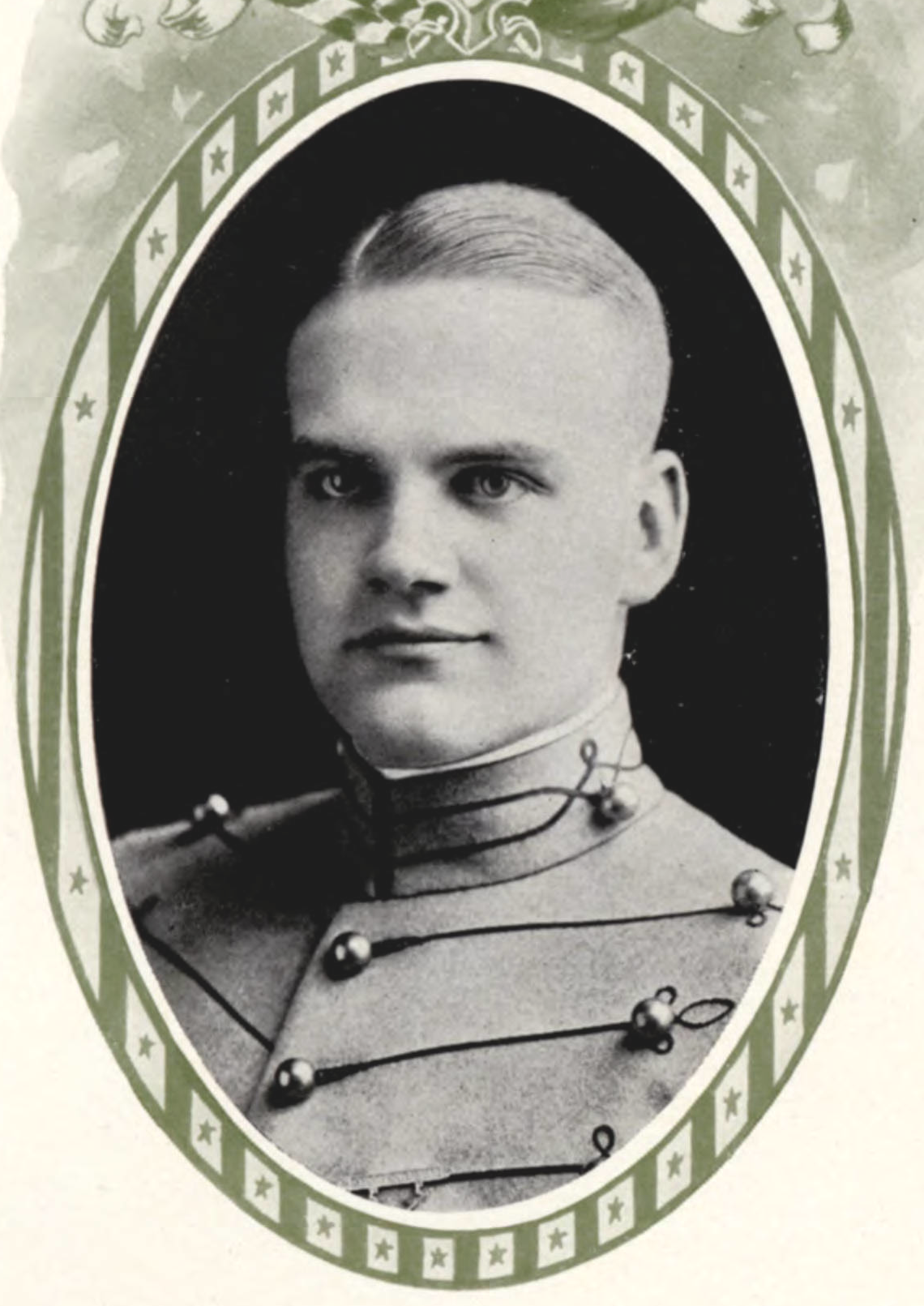
At West Point in 1916

Styer attended schools in the United States and the Philippines, and the National Preparatory Academy in Highland Falls, New York. He entered West Point on 14 June 1912, graduated third in a class of 125 in the class of 1916, and was commissioned as a second lieutenant in the United States Army Corps of Engineers on 13 June 1916. Several of his fellow graduates would, like Styer himself, attain general officer rank in the future. They included Stanley Eric Reinhart, Dwight Johns, William M. Hoge, Calvin DeWitt Jr., Horace L. McBride, Fay B. Prickett and Robert Neyland. During his graduation leave in July and August 1916, he was a voluntary assistant instructor with the New Jersey National Guard during his father's assignment as senior instructor. He was posted to the Engineer Depot in Columbus, New Mexico, on 21 September 1916. On 5 October 1916, he joined the 2d Engineers, with which he served in the Pancho Villa Expedition. He was promoted to captain on 15 May 1917, a few weeks after the American entry into World War I.

In August 1917, Styer sailed for France with his regiment. He attended the Army General Staff College at Langres in November, graduating first in his class and becoming an instructor there. He was promoted to major on 13 May 1918, and served as an observer with the British 19th (Western) Division during the Third Battle of the Aisne in June 1918. He saw action of the staff of the 3d Division in the Battle of Château-Thierry in July, and as an operations officer with the III Corps and 2d Division in the Aisne-Marne offensive in July and August. In September he embarked for the United States on USS Mount Vernon to join a new unit, but the ship was torpedoed by a German U-boat and was forced to return to Brest. A second attempt was more successful, and he was assigned to the Office of the Chief of Engineers in Washington, D.C., where he was serving when the war ended on 11 November 1918 due to the Armistice with Germany.

== Between the wars ==
On 23 September 1918, Styer married Dorothea Haeberle, the daughter of George C. Haeberle, a prominent businessman from Niagara Falls, New York, in a ceremony at Niagara Falls. They had a son, George Delp Styer, who graduated from Norwich University in 1942, and became an Army officer. In March 1919, Styer became a student at the U.S. Army Engineer School at Fort Humphreys in Virginia. He reverted to the rank of captain on 16 February 1920.

Styer graduated from Fort Humphreys in June 1920, and was posted to the Massachusetts National Guard in Cambridge, Massachusetts, where he was promoted to major again on 10 February 1921. He enrolled at the Massachusetts Institute of Technology in June 1921, and graduated in June 1922 with a Bachelor of Science in Civil Engineering. He returned to the Office of the Chief of Engineers in Washington, D.C., where he reverted to the rank of captain a second time on 4 November 1922. On 5 October 1925, he was posted to the New York Engineer District as executive officer and assistant district engineer. He was the district engineer from 16 June 1926 to 14 August 1926, and again from 30 June 1928 to 1 August 1928.

From 11 December 1928 to 28 August 1931, Styer was an Engineer in Europe with the American Battle Monuments Commission. He returned to the United States, and was District Engineer of the Pittsburgh Engineer District from 16 September 1931 to 9 May 1936. He was then assigned as Assistant Engineer for Maintenance at the Panama Canal from 19 May 1936 to 17 July 1939. Nearly twenty years after he was first promoted to major, he was promoted to the rank of lieutenant colonel on 1 June 1937.

== World War II ==
=== Construction Division ===
From 4 September 1939 to 19 June 1940, Styer was a student at the Army Industrial College. He became the commanding officer of the 8th Engineer Squadron at Fort McIntosh, Texas, from 3 August to 24 November 1940, and was executive officer of the Engineer Replacement Center at Fort Humphreys and Fort Leonard Wood, Missouri. On 12 December 1940, he was assigned to the Construction Division in the Office of the Quartermaster General. The US Army was about to embark on a national mobilization, and it was the task of the Construction Division to prepare the necessary accommodations and training facilities for the vast army that would be created. This enormous construction program had been dogged by bottlenecks, shortages, delays, spiralling costs, and poor living conditions at the construction sites, and newspapers published accounts charging it with incompetence, ineptitude, and inefficiency.

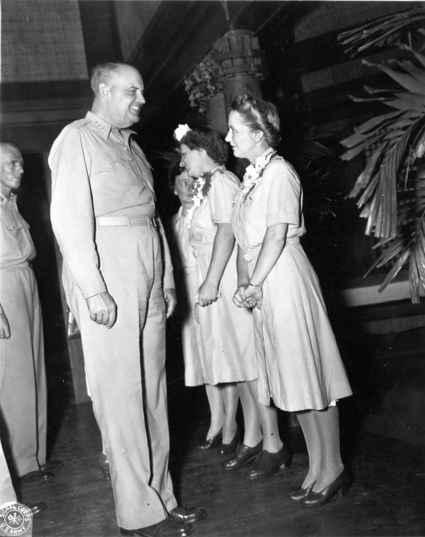
Styer with Colonel Westray B. Boyce

A new head, Colonel Brehon B. Somervell, took over the Construction Division on 12 December 1940, and four days later Somervell reorganized it, bringing Styer in as his deputy, and replacing all but two of the Construction Division's branch heads, one of the exceptions being Colonel Leslie R. Groves, Jr. One of Styer's tasks was finding talented officers to work on construction projects. His appeal to the Chief of Engineers released three officers, including Major Hugh J. Casey and Captains Edmund K. Daley and Garrison H. Davidson. By December 1941, 375 projects had been completed and 320 were still under way, with a total value of $1.8 billion. On 16 December 1941, the Construction Division was transferred from the Quartermaster Corps to the Corps of Engineers. Styer, who had been promoted to colonel on 8 April 1941, drew up the plan for the transfer and the new organization, in which he remained the deputy head. He was awarded the Army Distinguished Service Medal for his services.

=== Army Service Forces ===
On 5 February 1942, the Chief of Staff of the United States Army, General George C. Marshall, announced that he was considering a radical reorganization of the War Department, and gave his staff 48 hours to comment on the proposals. Somervell, now the Assistant Chief of Staff, G-4, and Styer drew up a plan for a new, overarching logistics command initially known as the Services of Supply. Their proposal was accepted, and the new command was created on 28 February 1942. It was renamed the Army Service Forces in March 1943, as the term "supply" was felt to be too narrow a description of the broad range of logistical activities carried out by the organization. Somervell became its commander, and Styer his chief of staff from 9 March 1942. Styer was promoted to brigadier general the next day, and major general on 8 August 1942. He became deputy commanding general of the Army Service Forces on 13 August 1943.

In September 1942, the director of the Office of Scientific Research and Development (OSRD), Vannevar Bush, suggested Styer be appointed director of the Manhattan Project, but Somervell did not wish to lose his services, and engineered the appointment of Groves instead. On 23 September 1942, Styer became a member of the Military Policy Committee, a group chaired by Bush (with James B. Conant as his alternate) with Rear Admiral William R. Purnell as its third member. As director, Groves was answerable to the Military Policy Committee, which was responsible for the higher direction of the Manhattan Project. When the Combined Policy Committee was formed in September 1943 by the Quebec Agreement, its chairman, Secretary of War Henry Stimson, had Styer appointed as his deputy. Styer also became chairman of its technical subcommittee, which included America's Richard Tolman, Britain's James Chadwick and Canada's C. J. Mackenzie. The technical subcommittee became very influential, as it furnished most of the data on which the Combined Policy Committee based its decisions.

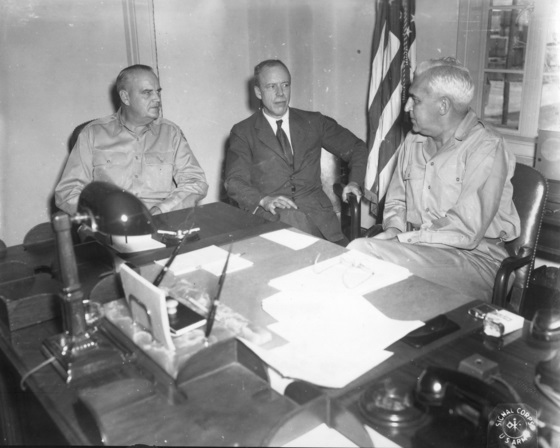
Styer (left) with Secretary of War Robert P. Patterson and U. S. High Commissioner to the Philippines Paul V. McNutt in McNutt's office in Manila in 1946

Styer was not confined to his office. In 1943, Somervell sent him to the China Burma India Theater to report on the Ledo Road. Styer's report persuaded the Combined Chiefs of Staff to allocate the required personnel, equipment and supplies to develop the road. He was promoted to lieutenant general on 7 November 1944.

=== Army Forces, Western Pacific ===
In April 1945, Somervell sent him to the Philippines to report on preparations for Operation Downfall, the invasion of Japan. The Supreme Allied Commander in the South West Pacific, General of the Army Douglas MacArthur, asked Styer to become head of a logistics organisation for Operation Downfall. Styer accepted the offer, but when he returned in May 1945 to assume the post, he found it was not what he had accepted. Instead, he became the commanding general of Army Forces, Western Pacific, a command co-equal with Lieutenant General Robert C. Richardson, Jr.'s Army Forces, Middle Pacific, which included logistical units, but also combat forces, while the planning responsibilities remained with MacArthur's General Headquarters.

On 24 September 1945, with the war over, MacArthur ordered Styer "to appoint military commissions for the trial of such persons accused of war crimes". To try General Tomoyuki Yamashita, Styer appointed a commission of five general officers: Major Generals Russel B. Reynolds, Leo Donovan and James A. Lester, and Brigadier Generals Morris C. Harwerk and Egbert F. Bullens. Styer had the authority to reduce the sentence handed down by the commission, but he upheld the commission's death sentence on 12 December. The sentence was upheld by the Supreme Court of the United States. On 22 February 1946, Styer signed the order for Yamashita's execution, which took place the following morning. General Masaharu Homma, the Japanese conqueror of Bataan and Corregidor, was subsequently also tried and convicted of war crimes committed by his troops during the notorious Bataan Death March, and Styer signed Homma's execution order too.

== Later life ==
Styer retired from the Army at his own request on 29 April 1947. He died in Coronado, California, on 26 February 1975. He was survived by his wife, son, brother and sister. His medals and decorations included two awards of the Distinguished Service Medal, and the Distinguished Service Star from the government of the Philippines. He was also appointed an honorary Knight Commander of the Order of the British Empire. Styer was interred at Arlington National Cemetery on 18 March 1975.
