= Army Service Forces =

Military unit

- Shoulder sleeve insignia
- Active: 1943–1946
- Disbanded: June 11, 1946
- Country: United States
- Branch: Army
- Wars: World War II

Commanders
- Notable commanders: Brehon B. Somervell; LeRoy Lutes

The Army Service Forces (ASF) was one of the three autonomous components of the United States Army during World War II, the others being the Army Air Forces and Army Ground Forces, created on 9 March 1942. By dividing the Army into three large commands, the Chief of Staff, General George C. Marshall, drastically reduced the number of officers and agencies reporting directly to him. The Army Service Forces brought together elements of five different components of the Army: elements of the War Department General Staff (WDGS), especially its G-4 division (responsible for logistics); the Office of the Under Secretary of War; the eight administrative bureaus; the nine corps areas, which became service commands; and the six supply arms and services, which became known as the technical services. The Army Service Forces was initially known as the United States Army Services of Supply but the name was changed on 12 March 1943, as it was felt that the term "supply" did not accurately describe the broad range of its activities. The Army Service Forces was abolished on 11 June 1946 and most of its functions were taken over by the War Department General Staff.

For most of its existence, the Army Service Forces was commanded by General Brehon B. Somervell, with Lieutenant General Wilhelm D. Styer as his chief of staff. After Styer left for the Pacific, he was succeeded by Major General LeRoy Lutes on 18 April 1945. Brigadier General Lucius D. Clay was the Deputy Chief of Staff for Requirements and Resources, and as such he was responsible for the development of the Army Supply Program, the operation of the Lend-Lease program, and liaison with the War Production Board concerning the allocation of raw materials. Although he had his own logistics staff in the G-4 division of the War Department General Staff, it was to Somervell and Styer that Marshall turned to for advice on logistical matters, and it was Somervell who attended the important wartime conferences.

Six supply arms and services became part of the new organization: the Corps of Engineers, Signal Corps, Ordnance Department, Quartermaster Corps, Chemical Warfare Service and the Medical Department. They were designated "supply services" in April 1942, and "technical services" in April 1943. A seventh technical service, the Transportation Corps, was created in July 1942. The technical services developed military equipment, manufactured or purchased it, stored it in depots, maintained and repaired it, and issued it to the troops. Each had its own budget, and together they accounted for half of the Army's appropriations.

The service commands were the field agencies of the ASF. There were initially nine of these, each responsible for a different geographical region. In August 1942 the Military District of Washington also assumed the status of a service command. The Northwest Service Command was created in September 1942. It was responsible for the construction and maintenance of the Alaska Highway, the operation of the railway between Skagway, Alaska, and Whitehorse, and the Canol Project. Army installations in the continental United States that were placed directly under the service commands included recruiting stations, induction and reception centers, repair shops, enemy alien and prisoner of war camps, medical and dental laboratories, Reserve Officers' Training Corps units, dispensaries, finance offices, disciplinary barracks and named general hospitals except for the Walter Reed General Hospital.

== Origins ==
By late 1941, there was dissatisfaction with the existing structure of the United States Army, and a recognition that change was required in order to fight World War II, which the United States was on the brink of entering. Lieutenant General Lesley J. McNair, the chief of staff of General Headquarters (GHQ), had broad responsibility for the organization and training of ground combat troops, but this brought him into conflict with the chiefs of the arms and services. At the same time, the Army Air Forces (AAF) sought greater autonomy. The establishment of an independent air force had been an aspiration of air officers between the wars, and despite the establishment of AAF in June 1941, they were still not satisfied with their status in what they saw as a war in which air power would play a dominant role. In October 1941, the AAF recommended the creation of autonomous air and ground forces, supported by a service force. However, the main driver was the Chief of Staff, General George Marshall, who felt overwhelmed by the large number of officers and agencies—at least 61—with direct access to him, and he received about fifty staff studies each day. This was in spite of explicit orders to bring to his attention only matters that could not be handled by anyone else.

The agencies reporting directly to the Chief of Staff could be divided into five groups:

- The War Department General Staff (WDGS) in Washington, DC. This was divided into five divisions, each with its own Assistant Chief of Staff. There were also three deputy chiefs of staff, one each for supply, administration and the air. The Deputy Chief for Air was also the chief of the AAF.
- The two major commands, the AAF and GHQ. These were responsible for the preparation and training of air and ground combat units respectively. GHQ was also responsible for the defense of the continental United States, which was conducted through four defense commands, the Central, Eastern, Southern and Western, which had been formed on 17 May 1941. GHQ had been set up with the idea that it would command the forces overseas, as had occurred in World War I, but by early 1942 it was apparent that World War II would be fought in many theaters. The Chief of Staff was the chief of the WDGS and the commanding general of GHQ, but the two were quite separate entities.
- The chiefs of the combat arms, service arms and administrative bureaus. These were located in Washington, DC, and had responsibility for training schools and the development of doctrine.
- There were four armies that controlled the combat troops located in the United States, and nine corps areas that provided them with services and managed most military posts. In late 1941 the corps areas were engaged in the task of inducting civilians and mobilization of the Army.
- There were also some miscellaneous installations, such as the United States Military Academy, United States Army Command and General Staff College and the ports of embarkation.

The G-4 Division of the WDGS, which was responsible for logistics, was headed from 25 November 1941 by Brigadier General Brehon B. Somervell. Supply was a critical issue, and became more so after the United States entered the war in December. The mobilization of the Army was being slowed by shortages of equipment, as was the deployment of troops overseas. If the United States Army was to take the field in 1942, production would need to be stepped up, but this was not the responsibility of G-4, but of the Under Secretary of War, Robert P. Patterson. The Office of the Under Secretary of War (OUSW) had grown from 78 people on 1 July 1939 to 1,136 on 1 November 1941. Somervell saw that the closest cooperation between G-4 and the OUSW was required, and he asked a New York attorney, Goldthwaite H. Dorr, to study the supply organization of the supply organization of the War Department.

Marshall called his staff together for a meeting on 3 February 1942, where he explained the new organization that he was considering. He wanted no more than three commands reporting to him, so everything which did not fit into the Army Ground Forces or Army Air Forces would become part of the Services of Supply. He gave his staff 48 hours to review the proposal and offer suggestions. The officer in charge of the reorganization, Major General Joseph T. McNarney, told Somervell to draw up an organization for a supply agency. Like McNarney's work, it had to be done in secret so as not to give the anticipated opposition a chance to organize. Somervell immediately contacted Dorr. They were assisted by two staff officers, Colonel Wilhelm D. Styer and Lieutenant Colonel Clinton F. Robinson. An important decision was to accept the continued existence of the supply arms and services, although a new transportation organization would be created. This meant that procurement would remain decentralized, but a position of Director of Procurement and Distribution was created. It was recognized that an organization devoted to supply would be preferable, but since Marshall wanted three agencies, not four, it was accepted that the administrative bureaus would also be part of the new organization, and these were placed under a Chief of Administrative Services. Somervell gave the proposed organization structure to McNarney in the second week of February.

The new organization was ordered by President Franklin D. Roosevelt on 28 February 1942 by Executive Order Number 9082 "Reorganizing the Army and the War Department". Details were provided in War Department Circular No. 59, dated 2 March, and the new organization was publicly announced by the Secretary of War, Henry L. Stimson, in a press release that day. It went into effect on 9 March, and Somervell assumed command of the United States Army Services of Supply (USASOS). The Services of Supply was renamed the Army Service Forces (ASF) on 12 March 1943, as it was felt that the term "supply" did not accurately describe its broad range of activities.

== Shoulder sleeve insignia ==
According to the website of the U.S. Army Institute of Heraldry, the shoulder sleeve insignia of the Army Service Forces consisted of "a blue five-pointed star, one point up, 1 3/8 inches in diameter on a white background within a red border, outside diameter 2 1/4 inches, inside invected of six." The design invokes the red, white and blue national colours of the United States. The patch was approved for wearing by War Department Overhead on 30 July 1941, Services of Supply on 27 March 1942, Army Service Forces on 12 March 1943, technical and administrative Services in June 1946, Department of the Army staff support on 8 October 1969, and Department of the Army field operating agencies on 29 October 1996.

== Organization ==
=== Staff divisions ===
The Army Service Forces brought together elements of five different components of the Army: elements of the War Department General Staff, especially its G-4 component; the Office of the Under Secretary of War; the eight administrative bureaus; the nine corps areas, which became the service commands; and the six supply arms and services, which became known as the technical services. Somervell commanded the Army Service Forces for most of its existence. For most of the war, Styer was his chief of staff. He left for the Pacific on 18 April 1945, and was succeeded by Major General LeRoy Lutes. In the directive that created the USASOS, Somervell created the position of Deputy Chief of Staff for Requirements and Resources, which was initially filled by Brigadier General Lucius D. Clay. He was responsible for the development of the Army Supply Program, the operation of the Lend-Lease program, and liaison with the War Production Board concerning the allocation of raw materials. He was succeeded by Howard Bruce on 27 November 1944.

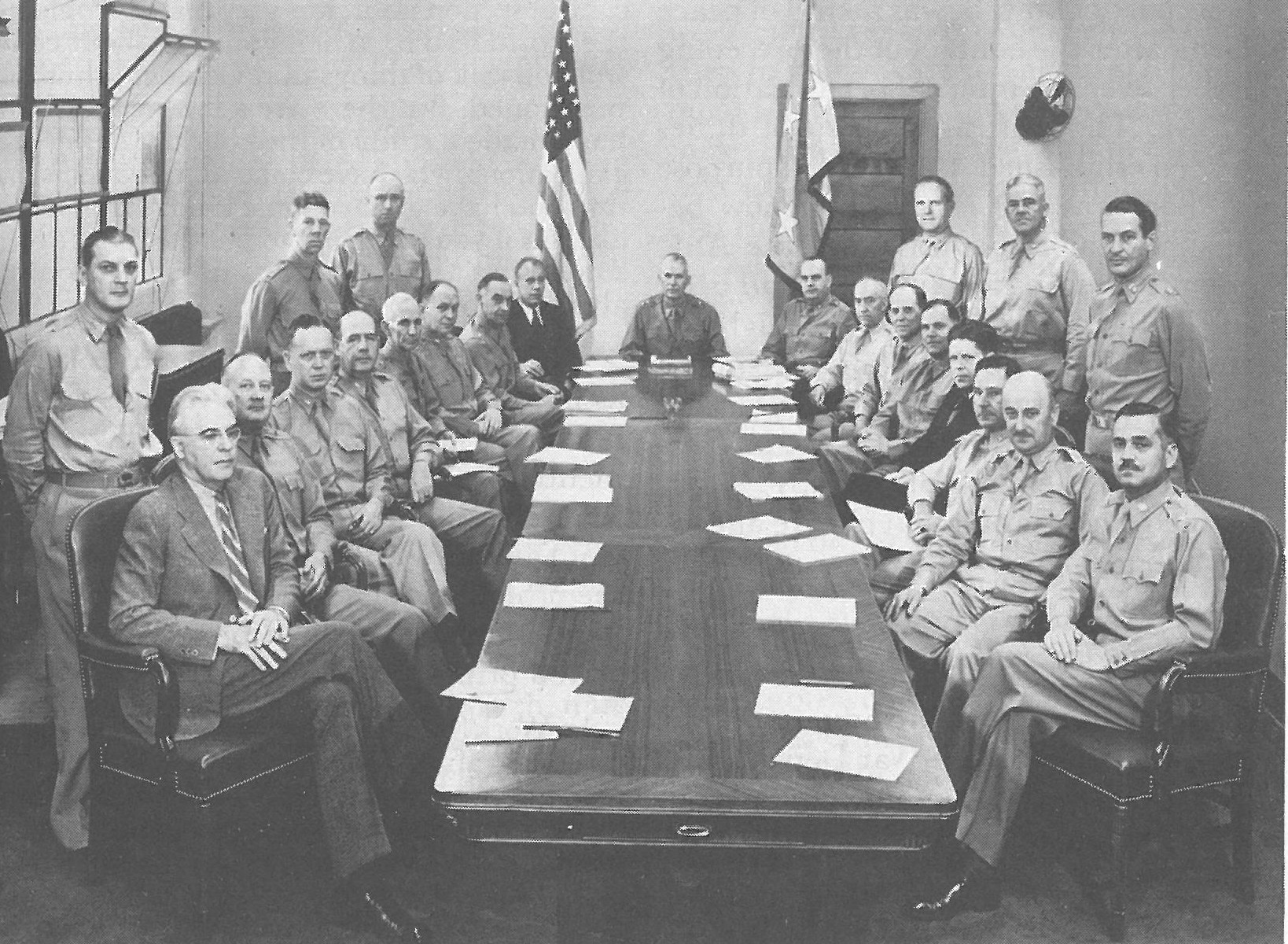
Weekly staff conference at Services of Supply headquarters in June 1942

Somervell organized his staff along functional lines, with divisions for requirements, resources, procurement, distribution, defense aid, operations, personnel, training and finance. This lasted just eight days before the procurement and distribution divisions were combined. The requirements, resources and production divisions were placed under Clay in April 1942. In July 1942, new divisions were created production and purchases, but in December the production and resources divisions were merged. A renegotiating division was created in August 1943 to renegotiate contracts, and a Readjustment Division in November 1943 to handle the termination of contracts. The Defense Aid Division was renamed the International Division in April 1942. Its role was to ensure that supplies earmarked for use by Allied nations were shipped. From 1943 on it also became involved in the distribution of civil affairs and military government supplies.

The Operations Division was headed by LeRoy Lutes. In July 1942 he became the Assistant Chief of Staff for Operations, with the Operations Division (renamed the Plans Division) and Distribution Branch (upgraded to a staff division) assigned to him. In August a strategic planning division was added. By July 1942 there were sixteen staff divisions, but only nine officers reporting directly to Somervell. The title of "assistant chief of staff" was replaced by "director" in May 1943. There were now six directors, for personnel, training, operations, materiel, finance and administration. Later that year, the Distribution (renamed Stock Control), Storage and the Maintenance Divisions were grouped together under a Director of Supply, Major General Frank A. Heileman.

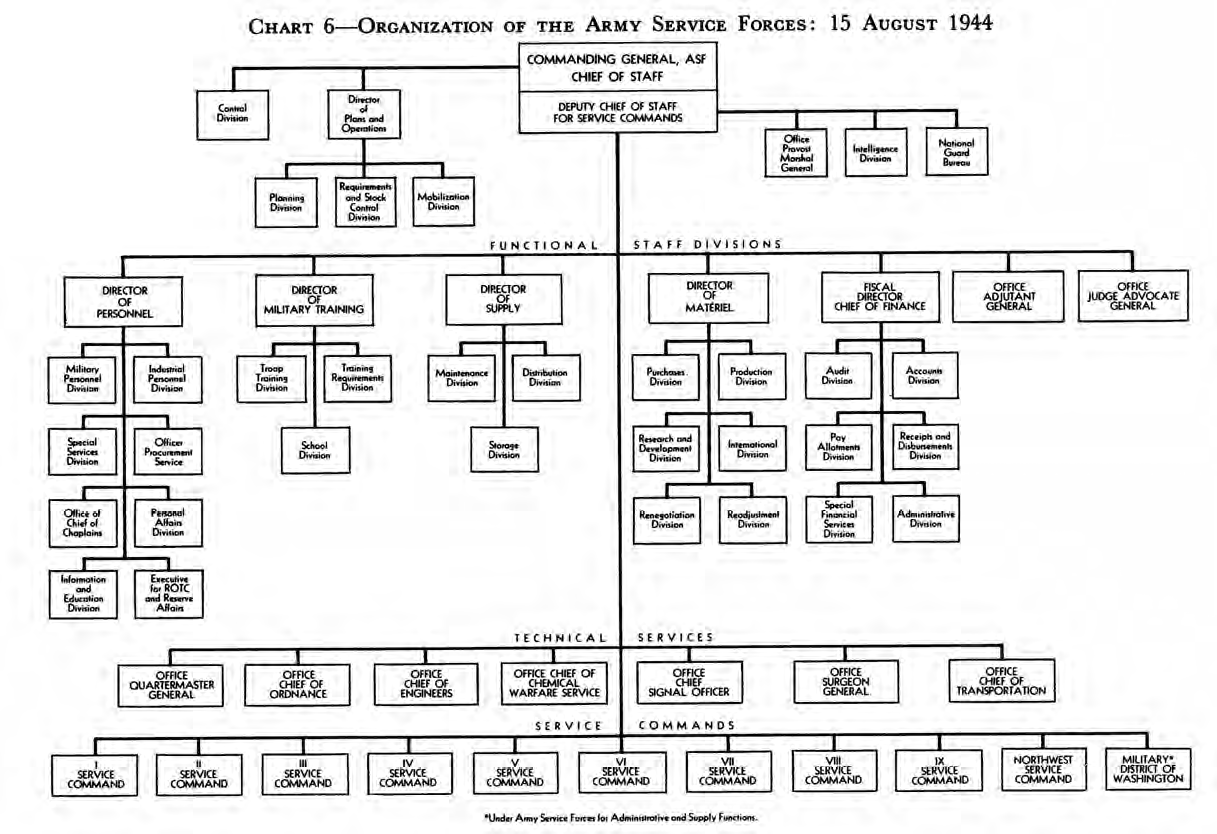
Organization of the Army Service Forces, 15 August 1944.

The position of Director of Administration was created in May 1943, with responsibility for the Adjutant General, Judge Advocate General, Army Exchange Service, Provost Marshal General, the National Guard Bureau and the Executive for Reserve and Reserve Officers' Training Corps (ROTC) Affairs. However, the positions of the Adjutant General and Judge Advocate General were considered too important and prestigious to be subordinated. In November 1943, the position of Director of Administration was abolished, and henceforth they reported directly to Somervell, and functioned as staff agencies of ASF. Responsibility for the other administrative services was dived among the staff directors. The Women's Army Auxiliary Corps was created in 1942 and became the Women's Army Corps (WAC) in September 1943. It was initially placed under the Director of Personnel. In November 1943 it was assigned to Somervell's office. On 10 February 1944, responsibility for the WAC was transferred to the G-1 (Personnel) Division of the WDGS. By April 1945, over 100,000 women were serving in the WAC. Other miscellaneous staff units such as the National Guard Bureau, the Executive for Reserve and ROTC, the Provost Marshal General and the Intelligence Division reported through the Deputy Chief of Staff for Service Commands, but this was never a satisfactory arrangement, and they too were transferred to the WDGS in May and June 1945. On 31 July 1943, 45,186 military and civilian personnel were working on ASF staff. By 1945, this had declined to 34,138 personnel. There were 723 work in the Office of the Commanding General, 2,675 for the Director of Personnel, 205 for the Director of Military Training, 523 for the Director of Supply, 913 for the Director of Materiel, 136 for the Director of Intelligence, 815 for the Judge Advocate General, 856 for the Provost Marshal General, 14,718 for the Fiscal Director and 12,574 for the Adjutant General. Of these, 16,305 were in ASF headquarters in Washington, DC.

=== Technical Services ===
When the Services of Supply was formed on 9 March 1942, six supply arms and services became part of the new organization: the Corps of Engineers, Signal Corps, Ordnance Department, Quartermaster Corps, Chemical Warfare Service and the Medical Department. In April 1942, shortly after they became part of the USASOS, they were redesignated "supply services". This term was replaced with "technical services" in April 1943, which, it was felt, better described their function.

A seventh technical service, the Transportation Corps, was established as the Transportation Division on 28 February 1942 under the authority of Executive Order 9082. It was renamed the Transportation Service in April 1942 and became a corps in its own right on 31 July 1942, with its own chief, replacement training center, officer candidate school and distinctive branch insignia. The Transportation Corps took over control of the ports of embarkation and regulating points from the Quartermaster Corps, and on 16 November, and the Military Railway Service was transferred from the Corps of Engineers to the Transportation Corps. Aside from that, the only significant changes in the responsibilities of the technical services during World War II were the transfer of the Construction Division of the Quartermaster Corps to the Corps of Engineers, which occurred on 1 December 1941, before the creation of the USASOS, and the transfer of responsibilities for the development, procurement, storage and maintenance of motor vehicles from the Quartermaster Corps to the Ordnance Department in July 1942.

Chiefs of the Technical Services
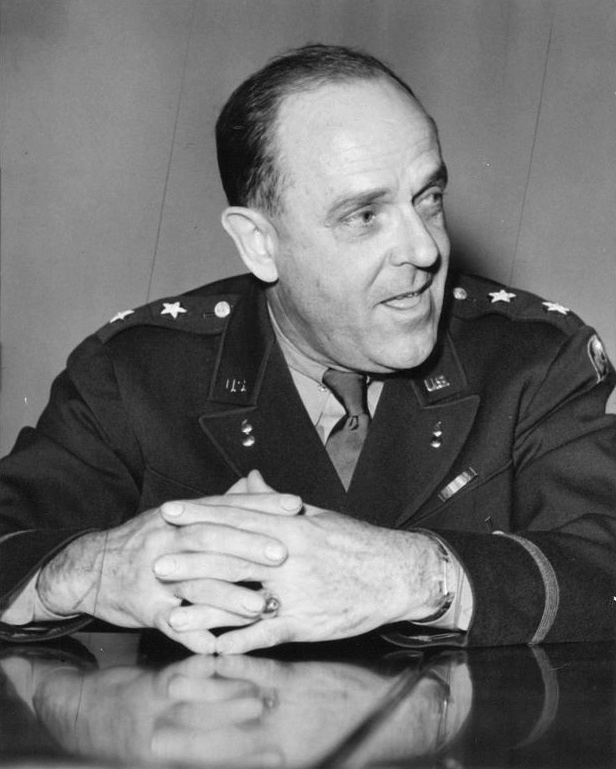
Lieutenant General Levin H. Campbell Jr., Chief of Ordnance

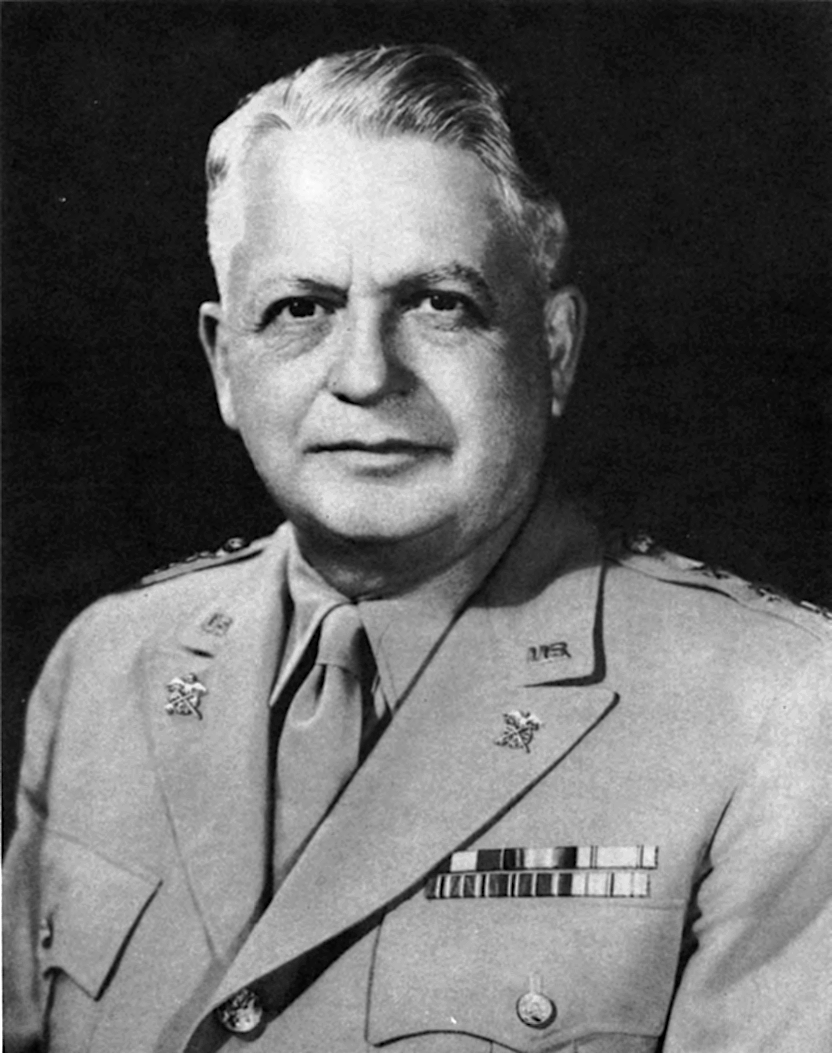
Lieutenant General Edmund B. Gregory, Quartermaster General

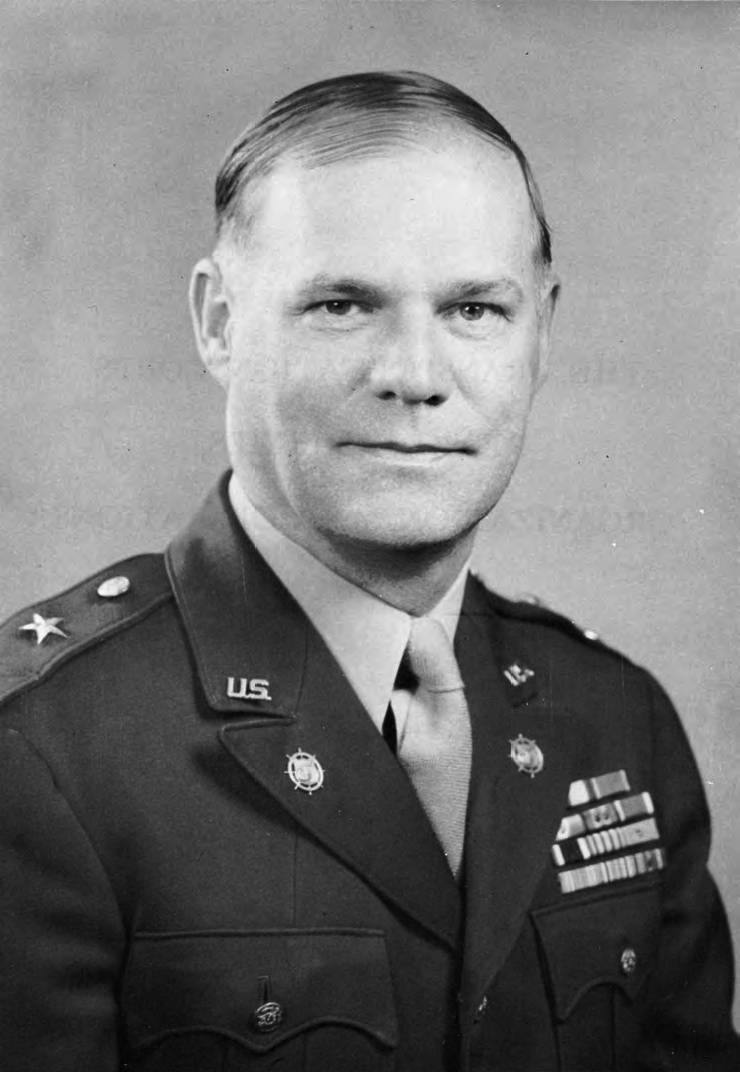
Major General Charles P. Gross, Chief of Transportation

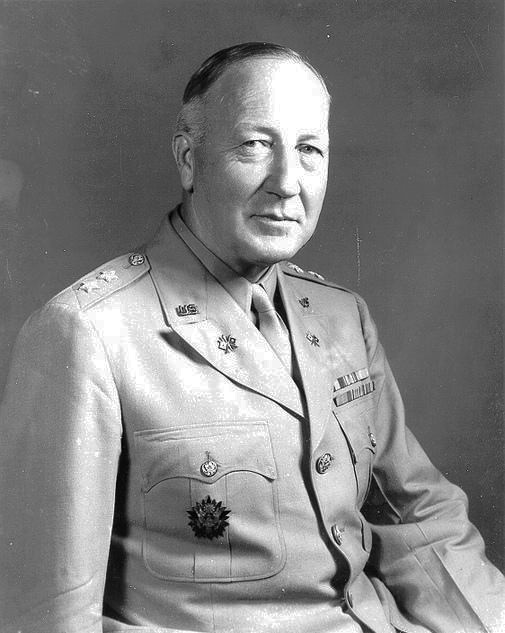
Major General Harry C. Ingles, Chief Signal Officer

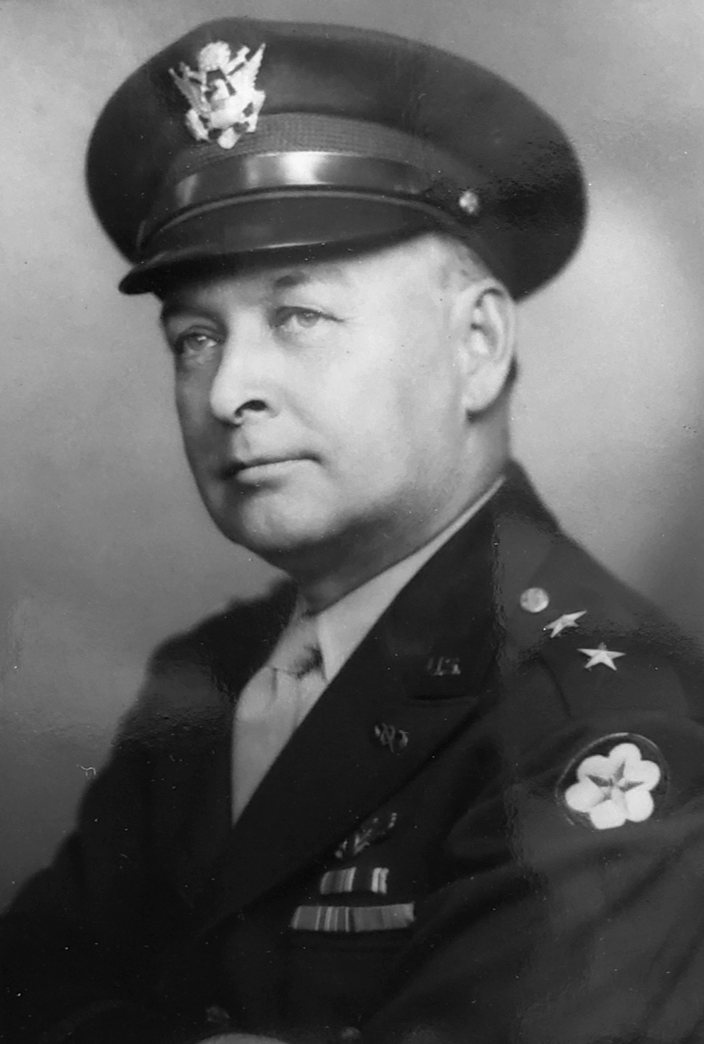
Major General William N. Porter, Chief of the Chemical Warfare Service

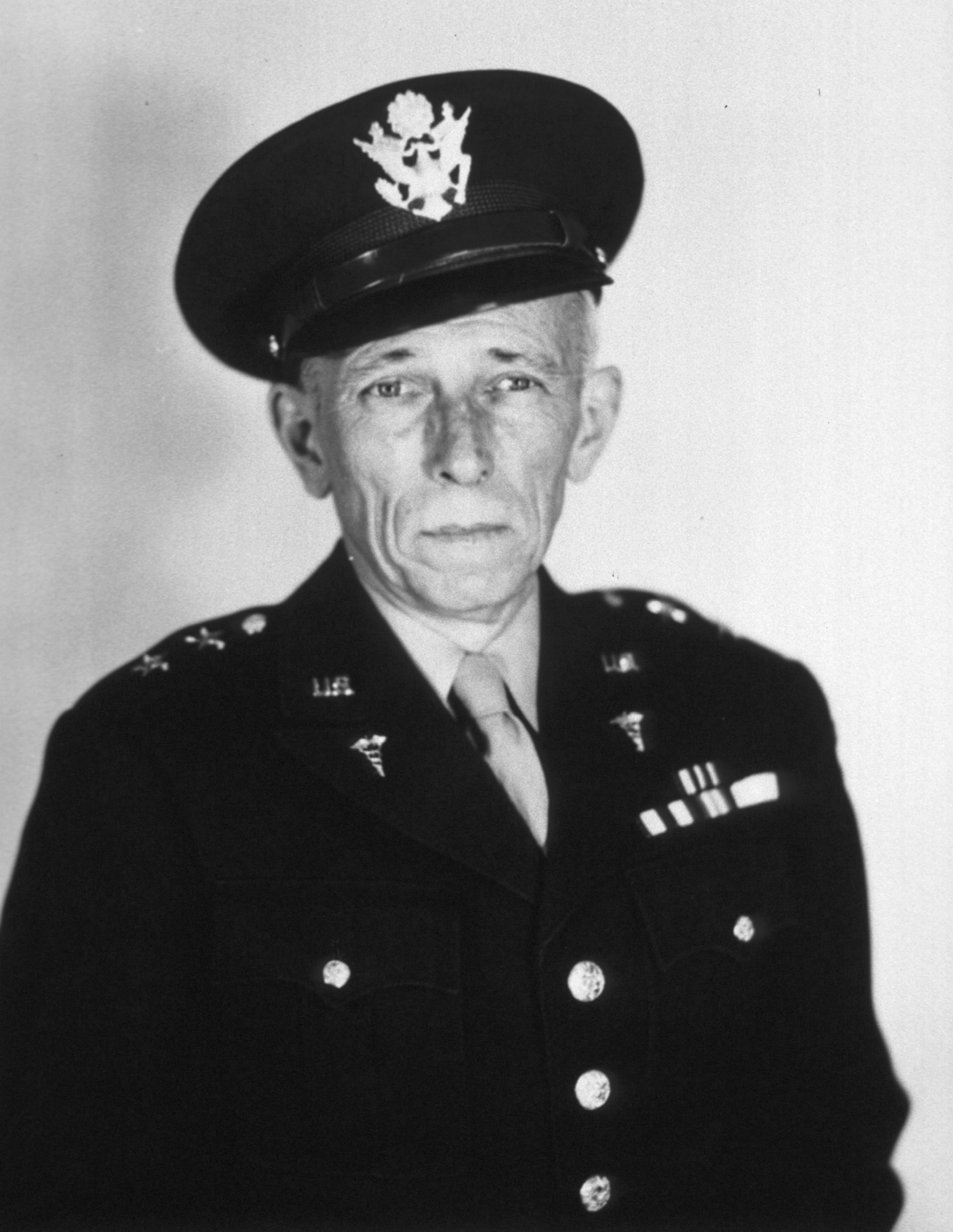
Major General Norman T. Kirk, Surgeon General

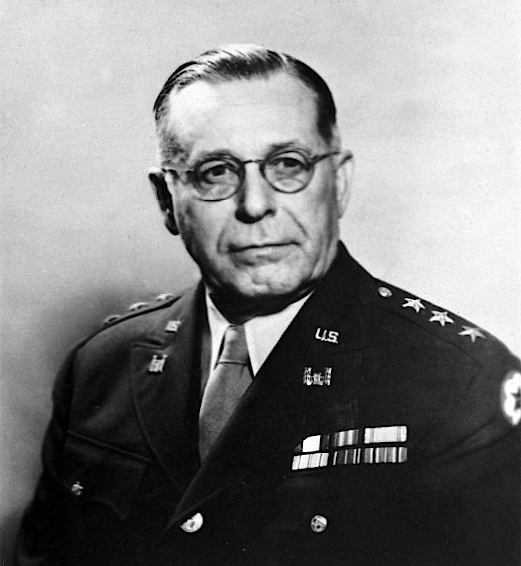
Lieutenant General Eugene Reybold, Chief of Engineers

Each technical service had a chief based in Washington, DC, with a large staff, and field installations scattered across the country. On 31 July 1943, the seven technical services controlled 728,796 military and civilian personnel in the United States, comprising 48 percent of the ASF. There were 261,118 in the Ordnance Department; 149,121 in the Transportation Corps; 103,450 in the Quartermaster Corps; 90,493 in the Corps of Engineers (including those assigned to the Manhattan District); 72,109 in the Signal Corps; 35,539 in the Chemical Warfare Service; and 16,936 in the Medical Department. Of these, 16,904 worked in the offices of the chiefs of the technical services. Unlike the chiefs of the four combat arms, who had their offices abolished and their authority transferred to the Chief of Army Ground Forces, neither the duties nor the structure of the technical services were substantially altered by their becoming part of the Army Service Forces. But their status changed; the chiefs no longer had direct access to the Chief of Staff or the Secretary of War. With the exception of the chief of the Transportation Corps, they chafed under their diminished status.

The chiefs of the technical services were all regular army soldiers. Three of them were in office when the USASOS was created and remained for the duration: the Quartermaster General, Major General Edmund B. Gregory; the Chief of Engineers, Major General Eugene Reybold; and the Chief of Chemical Warfare Service, Major General William N. Porter. New chiefs were selected jointly by Marshall and Somervell. Three were replaced during the war: the Chief of Ordnance, Major General Charles M. Wesson, retired in June 1942 and was succeeded by Major General Levin H. Campbell, Jr.; the Surgeon General, Major General James C. Magee retired in May 1943 and was succeeded by Major General Norman T. Kirk on 1 June; and the Chief Signal Officer, Major General Dawson Olmstead, was relieved by Somervell on 30 June 1943 and replaced by Major General Harry C. Ingles, a West Point classmate. Major General Charles P. Gross, the Chief of Transportation, was another classmate and a personal friend of Somervell, and was appointed on his recommendation in March 1942. In the case of the Ordnance Department, Roosevelt had nominated Major General James H. Burns, an assistant to presidential advisor Harry L. Hopkins and the chairman of the Combined Munitions Assignments Board, to replace Wesson but Burns asked for his nomination to be withdrawn as he felt he could not work with Somervell.

The technical services developed military equipment, manufactured or purchased it, stored it in depots, maintained and repaired it, and issued it to the troops. Each had its own budget, and together they accounted for half of the Army's appropriations. With installations in many Congressional districts, they had strong political support in the United States Congress. The internal organizations of the technical services were determined by their chiefs. The Medical Department, Corps of Engineers, Chemical Warfare Service and Transportation Corps were organized along functional lines, whereas the Ordnance Department was organized along commodity lines; the Signal Corps and Quartermaster Corps used a combination of both. ASF adjudicated jurisdictional disputes between the technical services, but the chiefs had Army-wide technical authority and supervision responsibilities. ASF therefore functioned as a coordinating command. Some standardization did result from the creation of ASF. ASF laid down certain principles of organization in the 1942 Services of Supply Organization Manual, and the ASF staff divisions pressed the technical services to adopt structures similar to that of ASF headquarters, as having this simplified their own work practices. However, with the exception the Transportation Corps, the technical services resisted this, as their organizational structures had evolved to suit their individual needs.

This was especially true of the way in which they organized their field installations, which reported directly to the office of their respective chief. These included procurement districts, supply depots, ports, arsenals and schools. Only the Ordnance Department had its own manufacturing plants, known as government-owned, government-operated (GOGO) plants to distinguished them from government owned, privately operated enterprises. There were 73 of these, of which 21 were for TNT and powder plants, 10 were ammonia and nitrate plants, 24 were loading plants, 12 were small arms plants, and 6 were other types. In 1943, 178 installations were operated the Ordnance Department, 113 by the Transportation Corps, 97 by the Quartermaster Corps, 92 by the Corps of Engineers, 54 the Signal Corps, 42 by the Medical Department and 32 by the Chemical Warfare Service. ASF controlled the number and size but not the organization of these installations. ASF instituted standard procedures for procurement December 1944, but this did not affect the organization of the purchasing offices, which still varied greatly. That month ASF also laid down a standard organization for all depots, but the each technical service still controlled them in accordance with its own procedures.

=== Service Commands ===
On 4 June 1920, the National Defense Act of 1920 abolished the old territorial divisions and replaced them with nine corps areas. Each had roughly the same population in 1920, and the idea was that each would control at least one division each of the Regular Army, National Guard and Organized Reserve. The corps areas became responsible for defending the United States against invasion by Canada or Mexico. The corps areas did not work out as well as hoped. During the 1920s and 1930s, many installations, particularly those belonging to the supply arms and services, were exempted from their control; their tactical organization failed to materialize due to budget shortfalls; and the best maneuver areas were in the IV and VIII Corps Areas. In July 1940, the control of tactical forces was removed from the corps areas with the creation of General Headquarters, United States Army, leaving the corps areas with administrative responsibilities only.

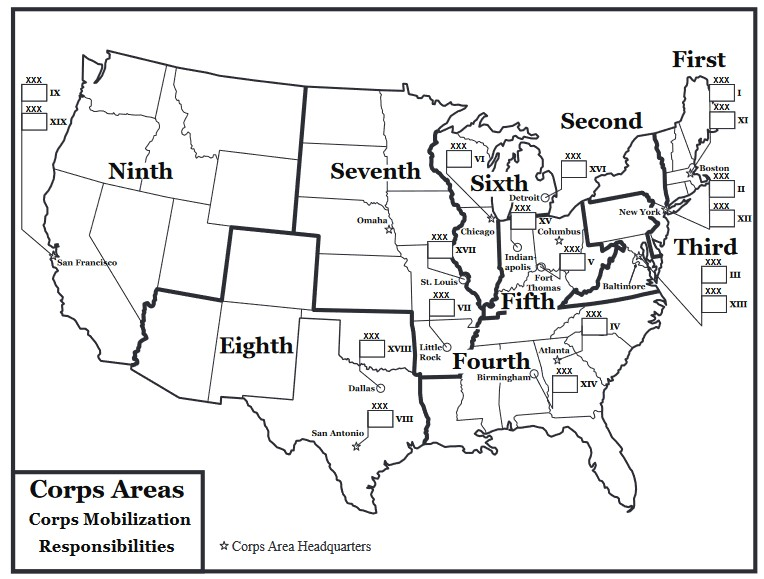
Corps areas with corps mobilization responsibilities, 1921

The corps areas were renamed service commands on 10 July 1942. The new title reflected their status as administrative and supply agencies. Somervell saw them fulfilling the role of field agencies of the ASF. Army installations in the continental United States were divided into four categories. Class I installations were ASF installations, which were placed directly under the service commands; Class II installations were posts and stations of the Army Ground Forces; Class III installations were Army Air Forces bases; and Class IV installations were those which, on account of their technical nature, remained under the direct command of a chief of a technical or administrative service. These included the GOGO manufacturing plants, proving grounds, procurement offices and the ports of embarkation. Class I installations included recruiting stations, induction and reception centers, repair shops, enemy alien and prisoner of war camps, medical and dental laboratories, Reserve Officers' Training Corps (ROTC) units, dispensaries except for the General Dispensary in Washington, DC, finance offices, disciplinary barracks and named general hospitals except for Walter Reed General Hospital.

The boundaries of the service commands and the location of their headquarters were not changed, and they remained the same throughout the war with one exception. The Military District of Washington (MDW) was created in May 1942. It included the District of Columbia and Arlington County, Virginia. In August 1942 it was separated from the Third Service Command and assumed the status of a service command, except that its commander also served as the headquarters commandant for the War Department, and as such also reported to the Deputy Chief of Staff of the Army. The MDW was enlarged in December 1942 to include Fort Washington and Fort Belvoir. One additional service command was created: the Northwest Service Command, in September 1942, with its headquarters at Whitehorse in the Canadian Yukon Territory. It was responsible for the construction and maintenance of the Alaska Highway, the operation of the railway between Skagway, Alaska and Whitehorse, and the Canol Project. It was abolished on 30 June 1945, and its responsibilities were transferred to the Sixth Service Command. On 31 July 1943, 751,911 personnel were assigned to the service commands, representing 45 percent of the ASF.

The idea of a unified command of many arms and services was a familiar one to Army officers—the division was an expression of the concept—but it had not been applied to the continental United States before. With the creation of GHQ in 1940, the command of an Army post had become separated from that of the combat units stationed there, who became tenants of a Class II installation. At a Class II installation, there was a post commander who was responsible to the commanding general of the service command in which it was located. His job was to provide services to the AGF units stationed there. The principle was that the customer was always right, so the post commander complied with requests from the AGF units there. The increasingly stringent manpower situation from 1943 on meant that sometimes the post commander had to ask the AGF units for assistance.

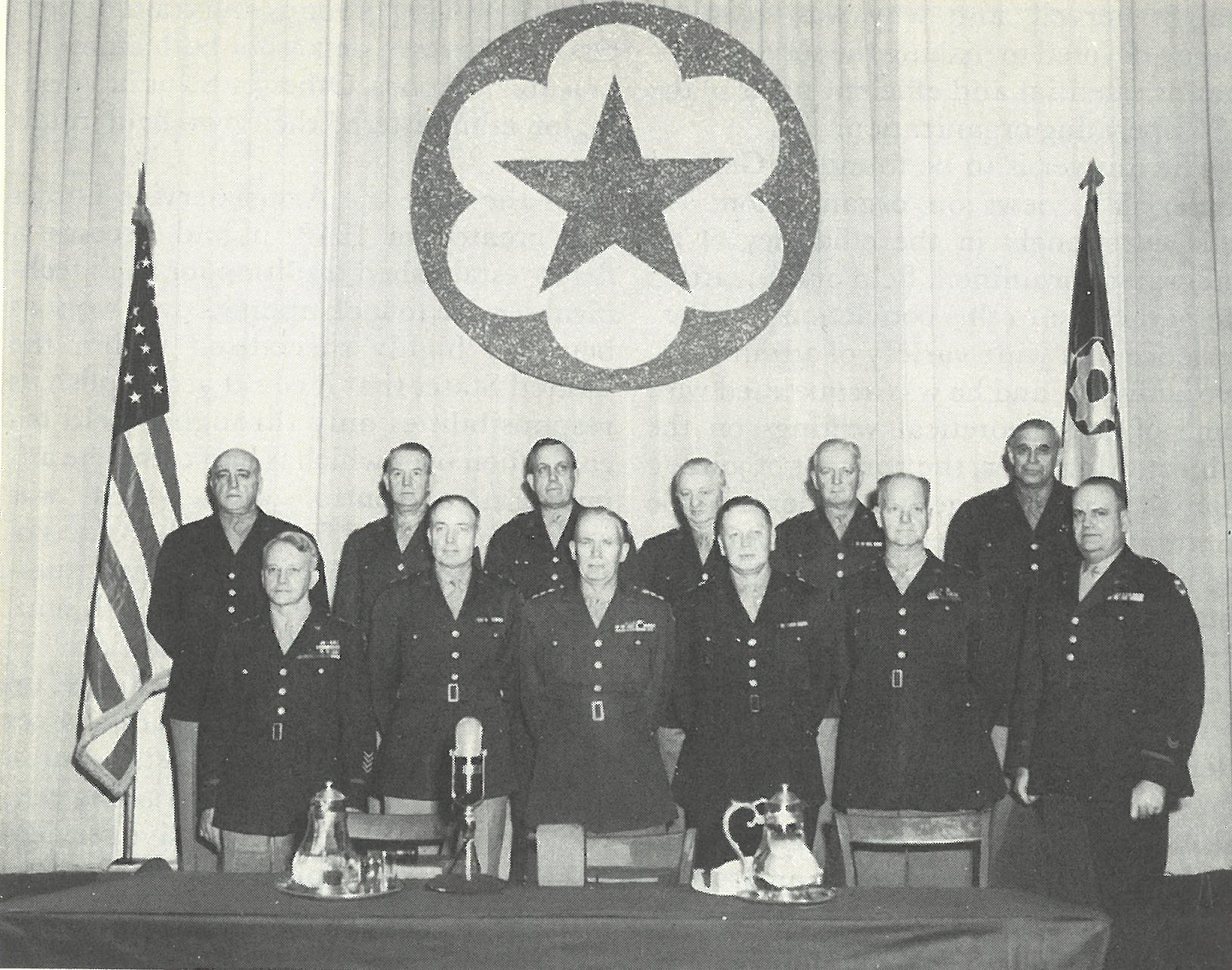
Commanding generals of the service commands and the Military District of Washington

The technical services generally regarded their work as so specialized that it could only be carried out by dedicated field installations over which they had complete control. From the beginning, many procurement and storage installations were exempted from their control, becoming Class IV installations, and Gross successfully argued the case for the staging areas and ports of embarkation to also be exempt. On the other hand, there were many installations that had formerly been centrally controlled that now became Class I installations. These included the named general hospitals. To the ASF staff these were more Army posts with buildings to be maintained, staff and patients to be fed, and utilities to be provided. Sometimes there were even German and Italian prisoners of war to be guarded. The Surgeon General argued that these administrative tasks were incidental to the function of hospitals.

The Army Specialized Training Program and training for the Women's Army Corps were directly controlled by the service commands. Several training installations of the administrative and technical services were designated as Class IV installations. These included the School of Military Government under the Provost Marshal General, the Edgewood Arsenal under the Chief of the Chemical Warfare Service, Camp Lee under The Quartermaster General, the Aberdeen Proving Ground under the Chief of Ordnance, Fort Monmouth and Camp Murphy under the Chief Signal Officer, and Carlisle Barracks under the Surgeon General. However others were classified as Class I installations. These included the Signal Corps training center at Camp Crowder, the Engineer training centers at Fort Leonard Wood and Fort Belvoir, the Quartermaster training center at Fort Warren, and the Transportation Corps training center at Camp Gordon Johnston. But in these cases the commandant or commanding officer was appointed, and training activities were those specified by, the chief of the technical service concerned. The difference between Class I and Class IV installations was never settled.

Service Commands (strengths as at 31 July 1943)
Insignia	Service Command	Commander	Headquarters	Location	Personnel	Reference
	First Service Command	Major General Sherman Miles	Boston, Massachusetts	Connecticut, New Hampshire. Maine, Massachusetts, Rhode Island, Vermont	31,246	
	Second Service Command	Major General Thomas A. Terry	Governors Island, New York	Delaware, New Jersey, New York	50,749	
	Third Service Command	Major General Milton Reckord (until December 1943); Major General Philip Hayes	Baltimore, Maryland	District of Columbia (until August 1942), Maryland, Pennsylvania, Virginia	60,548	
	Fourth Service Command	Major General William Bryden (until 15 January 1944); Major General Frederick Uhl (until 10 June 1945); Major General Edward H. Brooks	Atlanta, Georgia	Alabama, Florida, Georgia, Louisiana, Tennessee, Mississippi, North Carolina, South Carolina	175,166	
	Fifth Service Command	Major General Daniel Van Voorhis (until 2 July 1943); Major General Fred C. Wallace (until 2 December 1943); Major General James L. Collins	Columbus, Ohio	Indiana, Kentucky, Ohio, West Virginia	42,600	
	Sixth Service Command	Major General George Grunert (until September 1942); Major General Henry Aurand (until November 1944); Major General Russell B. Reynolds (until 23 May 1945); Major General David McCoach Jr.	Chicago, Illinois	Illinois, Wisconsin, Michigan	42,050	
	Seventh Service Command	Major General Frederick Uhl (until 10 January 1944); Major General Clarence Danielson	Omaha, Nebraska	Arkansas, Iowa, Kansas, Minnesota, Wyoming, Missouri, Nebraska, North Dakota, South Dakota	76,530	
	Eighth Service Command	Major General Richard Donovan (until 15 June 1945); Lieutenant General Walton H. Walker	Dallas, Texas	Colorado, Texas, New Mexico, Oklahoma	147,952	
	Ninth Service Command	Major General Kenyon Joyce (until 11 October 1943); Major General David McCoach Jr. (until 1 September 1944); Major General William Shedd	Fort Douglas, Utah	Arizona, California, Idaho, Montana, Nevada, Oregon, Utah, Washington	106,991	
	Military District of Washington	Major General John T. Lewis (until 6 September 1944); Major General Charles F. Thompson	Washington, DC	Washington, DC, Arlington County, Virginia	18,079	
	Northwest Service Command	Brigadier General James A. O'Connor (until 20 February 1944); Brigadier General Ludson D. Worsham (until 6 May 1944); Colonel Frederick S. Strong Jr. (until 30 June 1945)	Whitehorse, Yukon Territory	Alaska, British Columbia, Yukon Territory		

== Operations ==
Although he had an Assistant Chief of Staff, G-4, on the WDGS, it was to Somervell and the staff of ASF that Marshall turned to for advice on logistical matters, and it was Somervell who would attend the important wartime conferences. Logistics and strategy were interdependent; no strategic plan could be put into effect without due consideration of the logistical constraints. The ASF identified four major influences of logistics on strategy:

1. The availability of supplies and resources in the United States at the time of the operation;
2. Shipping and transport capacity in the United States;
3. The capacity of the beaches and ports in the theater of operations, and the ability to move supplies from them to the combat areas; and
4. The enemy's ability to interfere with the logistical support.

=== Sledgehammer ===
The most important strategic decision of the war was to concentrate on the war in Europe against Germany rather than the Pacific War against Japan. This made sound logistical sense: the distance across the Atlantic to the United Kingdom was half that across the Pacific to Australia, the largest ports in the United States were on the Atlantic coast, most of the industry was located in the northeast, and the railway network was oriented to the movement of goods there. This meant that forces could be deployed to the UK much faster than to the Pacific. Resources were not adequate to permit simultaneous action in both in 1942, so the Combined Chiefs of Staff decided to build up the forces in the UK. This activity up was codenamed Operation Bolero.

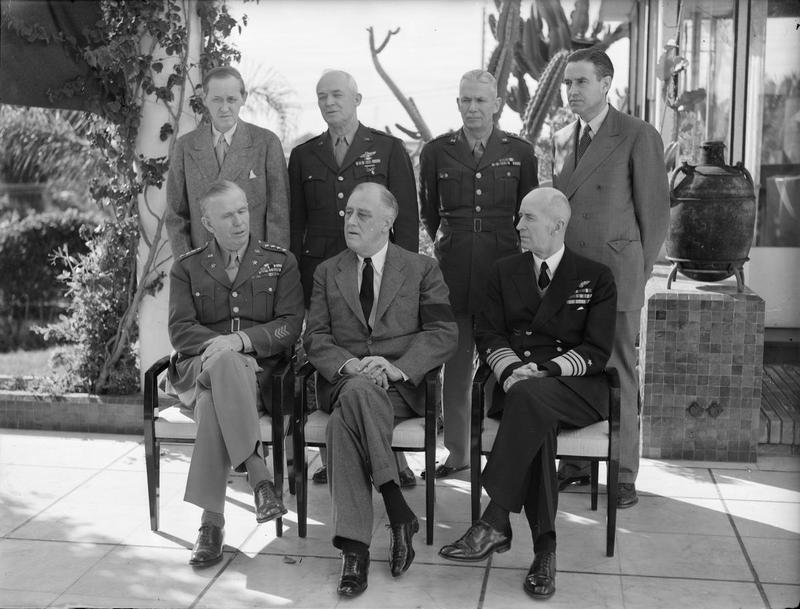
President Franklin D. Roosevelt and his advisors at the Casablanca Conference in January 1943. Standing, left to right: Harry Hopkins, Lieutenant General Henry H. Arnold, Lieutenant General Brehon B. Somervell, W. Averell Harriman. Seated: General George C. Marshall, President Roosevelt, Admiral Ernest King.

Action was desirable to relieve the pressure on Britain and the Soviet Union. Bolero was to be followed by an emergency assault across the English Channel in the event of indications of a sudden German or Soviet collapse in 1942, codenamed Operation Sledgehammer, and a major one in 1943, codenamed Operation Roundup. Roundup required a million American troops to be moved to the UK by the 1 April 1943 target date. The ASF staff determined that the major constraints were the availability of shipping in the United States, and the capacity of British ports to handle the volume of cargo. The War Shipping Administration agreed to provide 70 to 100 sailings in June, July and August 1942 to take advantage of the long Summer daylight hours in the UK.

Somervell also approached Lord Leathers, the British Minister of War Transport, for a loan of fifty British ships. Often the equipment most needed in the UK was not available, but ASF shipped what was. To maximize the usilization of shipping space, ships were loaded "full and down", using up all cargo space and weighing them down to the Plimsoll line. By July, British setbacks in the Middle East caused shipping and supplies to be sent there instead. That month, ASF shipped 38,000 long tons (39,000 t) of equipment to the British forces in Egypt. Sinkings by German U-boats reduced the ships available for Bolero still further, and by the end of August only a fraction of the required cargo had been shipped.

The ability of the United States to conduct Sledgehammer and Roundup was hampered by a shortage of landing craft and crews. In May 1942, the SOS was directed to train Army landing craft crews, and the Engineer Amphibian Command was established for this purpose on 10 June. The Navy agreed to provide the crews for the larger ocean-going landing ships. By July, it was apparent that there would not be sufficient landing craft to conduct Sledgehammer. Sledgehammer had been abandoned in favor of an invasion of French Northwest Africa (Operation Torch), a ship-to-shore operation, and plans for the 1943 cross-Channel invasion operation were scaled back. The Navy then announced that it would take over the operation of all landing craft. Given the additional time, the Navy now believed that it could train all boat crews. Training was restricted to the three engineer special brigades that had already been created, which were sent to the Southwest Pacific Area.

=== Bolero ===
Chaos had resulted during World War I because the organization of the SOS in France was different from that of the War Department, and an important lesson of that war was the need for the theater SOS organization to parallel the one the United States. Marshall and Somervell wanted it led by someone familiar with the SOS organization, and selected Major General John C. H. Lee, who had previously commanded the Pacific Ports of Embarkation in the United States. Each branch head in SOS headquarters was asked to nominate his best two men, one of whom was selected by Somervell and Lee for SOS-ETO headquarters, while the other remained in Washington.

Somervell was disturbed by the proposed troop basis of the European Theater of Operations (ETO), which provided for just 277,000 personnel. This represented about 26 percent of the proposed theater strength, which Somervell felt was insufficient to unload, transport and store the flow of Bolero supplies. He was overruled by the Operations Division (OPD) of the WDGS, which prioritized combat and air units for deployment to the UK. Its 1942 troop basis for the Army as a whole provided for only 11.8 percent of the Army's strength to be service troops. USASOS was unable to raise units without personnel, but by June 1942 every theater commander was calling for more. They then accepted partially trained units with the idea that they could learn on the job, but this did not work out well. In September, OPD slowed the activation of ground units and raised the proportion of service troops to 35 percent.

That month, the War Production Board sent Somervell a report by the economist Simon Kuznets, which concluded that the purchasing agencies had been so preoccupied with placing contracts and expediting production of military goods that in the process they had exceeded the ability of the economy to produce them. The result of the uncontrolled purchasing would be widespread shortages of raw materials. Somervell and Patterson were skeptical, but agreed that setting unrealistic production targets was counterproductive. The matter was referred to the Joint Chiefs of Staff, who cut the military spending by $13 billion to $80 billion (equivalent to cutting by $202 billion to $1,245 billion in 2025). The planned strength of the Army was reduced by 300,000 and there practice of issuing only 50 percent of the equipment allowance of units in training was extended.

=== North Africa ===
The increase in service troops in ETOUSA came too late. The flow of Bolero supplies overwhelmed the service units in the UK, and were stored in depots without proper markings, and without records being kept of what was in each depot. The result was that equipment required for Torch could not be located in time, and on 8 September Lee had to ask for it to be shipped from the United States. USASOS was unable to ship the requested 260,000 measurement tons (290,000 m^{3}) of supplies in time, but with frantic efforts the technical services were able to ship 132,000 measurement tons (150,000 m^{3}); another eight shiploads followed that would join convoys en route from the UK to North Africa. The Western Task Force was loaded in the United States, at Norfolk and Newport News. By 27 September it was clear that the ports of Morocco could not handle the required stores, and the Navy could not provide escorts for multiple convoys. Given a choice between reducing the number of personnel or the number of vehicles, the latter option was chosen.

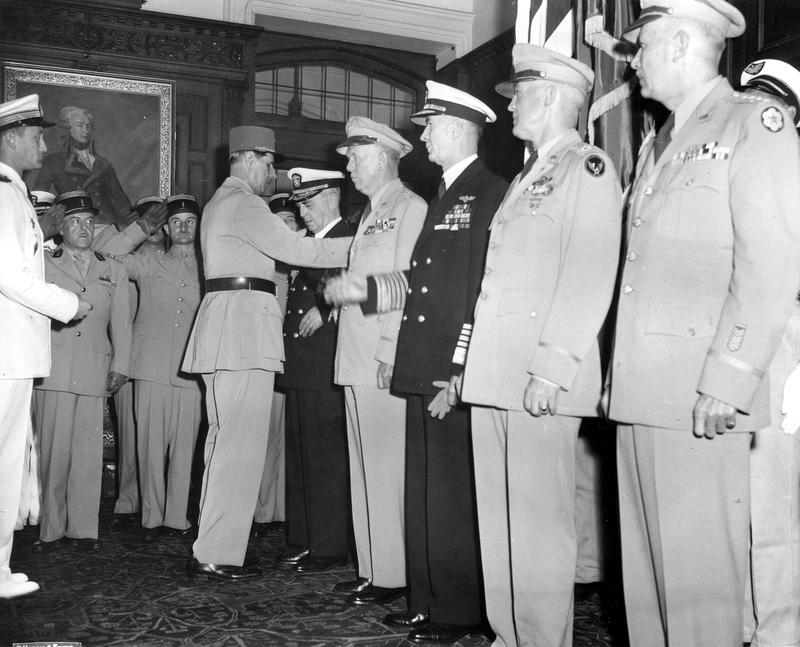
Charles de Gaulle decorates the Joint Chiefs of Staff and Somervell (right)

The Torch landings went reasonably well, and the initial objectives were attained, but poor planning and execution, and stiff German and Italian resistance caused a drawn-out campaign, and the difficulty of shipping supplies mounted. In January 1943, the Supreme Allied Commander, Lieutenant General Dwight D. Eisenhower, asked Somervell if he could provide additional transportation resources. Somervell (in North Africa for the Casablanca Conference) saw this as an opportunity to demonstrate what the USASOS could do. He secured an assurance from the Commander-in-Chief, United States Fleet, Admiral Ernest King, that the Navy would provide escorts for an extra convoy, and ordered Styer to ship 5,400 trucks, 2,000 trailers and 100 locomotives. Rain and snow slowed loading, but these vehicles, totaling 220,000 measurement tons (250,000 m^{3}), were loaded on 23 ships in 21 days. The special convoy, known as UGS 5½, sailed on 15 February and arrived in North Africa on 6 March.

The North African campaign raised new logistical concerns. One was the unanticipated requirement for civilian relief supplies. This was the responsibility of a civilian agency, the Office of Foreign Relief and Rehabilitation Operations, but competition for shipping, port and transportation resources soon arose between military and civil requirements. It became apparent that civilian relief had to be at least a component of military planning. It was agreed that civil affairs would be a military responsibility for the first 90 days of a major operation, and a civilian section was added to ASF headquarters in July 1943. In November responsibility for civilian relief was transferred to the military.

Another important development was the program for re-equipping the French Army. Eisenhower allocated 25,000 long tons (25,000 t) per convoy for this purpose, but the French commander, Général d'Armée Henri Giraud, was not satisfied with this allocation. Eisenhower then asked Marshall if a special convoy cou;ld be provided, and Marshall turned this request over to USASOS. The Navy agreed to provide an escort for a special convoy, UGS 6½, and Somervell asked the War Shipping Administration for twenty-five ships. Nineteen were ultimately provided, and USASOS loaded the convoy, which sailed in March 1943 with 132,000 long tons (134,000 t) of supplies. In July, Somervell met with Giraud to discuss the latter's needs, and it was decided to ship another 200,000 long tons (200,000 t) in July and August. The program ultimately provided eight divisions for the Allied cause that fought in the Italian and southern France campaigns, but the French were unable to provide a full complement of service units.

=== China-Burma-India ===
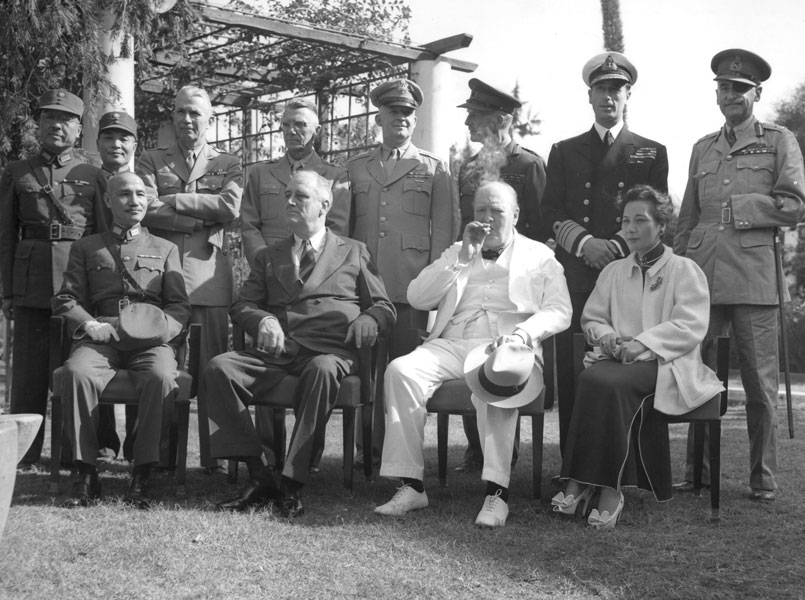
Somervell (with arms crossed) and senior British, American and Chinese leaders

Although the war against Germany had top priority, ASF did not neglect the war against Japan. After the Casablanca Conference, Somervell flew to Karachi in British India, where he met with Lieutenant General Joseph W. Stilwell, the commander of American troops in the China-Burma-India Theater (CBI), and Field Marshal Sir Archibald Wavell, the British Commander-in-Chief, India. Somervell judged that the Assam line of communication (LOC) was inadequate to support the air bases sending supplies to China by air over the Hump, as the route over Himalayan Mountains was called, and the engineers working on the construction of the Ledo Road to link Burma with China by road and pipeline.

Somervell pressed the British for permission for American troops to take over the running of the Bengal and Assam Railway and the barge traffic on the Brahmaputra River. For a time, Marshall considered having Somervell replace Stilwell, with Lieutenant General Jacob L. Devers taking over ASF. While happy for the Americans to take over the river traffic, the British at first balked at handing over control of the railway to the Americans, but agreed in October 1943. Somervell appointed Colonel Paul F. Yount, who had operated the Iranian railway to Tehran, to head it and arranged for additional construction equipment, engineer supplies and service troops to be sent to CBI. By July, the railway had exceeded the 22,000 short tons (20,000 t) per month target set at the Quebec Conference for 1 January 1946. In August, 16,439 cars rolled along it, an average of 530 per day, compared with 327 in March. By September, the it was carrying 6,537 long tons (6,642 t) per day, and there was still ten percent capacity to spare.

=== Shipping crisis ===
Somervell did not directly involve himself in the affairs of the ETO nearly as much, for fear that Eisenhower and Lee would resent it, but in October 1944, a major shipping crisis developed that threatened to derail the global war effort. Inadequate port facilities created congestion at the ports in Europe, with ships left waiting for weeks to discharge. This was exacerbated by a similar crisis in the Southwest Pacific Area, also the result of a lack of port capacity. Lee insisted that the supplies the ships carried were required, and that use of ships as floating warehouses allowed him to meet critical requests from Eisenhower.

By 20 October over 240 vessels were awaiting discharge in Northwest Europe, and Somervell informed Lee that he could expect no more ships carrying rations, vehicles or ammunition until he made headway with reducing the backlogs. Somervell sent Clay to ETO to resolve problems at the port of Cherbourg, and Brigadier General John M. Franklin, the Assistant Chief of Transportation for water transportation, to advise the ETO on improving turnaround time and developing more realistic estimates of port capacity. He arrived in France on 28 October, and was appointed the Assistant Chief of Transportation of COMZ and ETOUSA.

In November, he chairman of the Maritime Commission, Vice Admiral Emory S. Land, noted that 350 ships were being held idle in the theaters awaiting discharge, and 400 more WSA vessels were being retained for various uses by theater commanders. This represented 7,000,000 deadweight tons (7,100,000 deadweight tonnes) of shipping, which was about 30 percent of all Allied-controlled tonnage. As ships failed to return on time, supplies began piling up at the ports, depots and railway sidings in the United States.

Somervell suggested cuts be made to the shipping allocated to the British import program, Lend-Lease shipments to the UK and Soviet Union, and to civilian relief. The WSA and the Maritime Commission opposed this, seeing no reason why civilians should have to tighten their belts due to the inability of American theater commanders to make efficient use of the shipping supplied to them. Somervell cancelled sailings to both ETO and SWPA. The crisis subsided after the opening of the port of Antwerp in November, but Somervell sent Gross to ETO the following month to advise on making better use of the available port capacity.

=== Manhattan Project ===
ASF was also responsible for the Manhattan Project, which developed the first atomic bombs. Syer was designated the Army's representative on nuclear matters. At first he was not allowed to reveal anything about it to Somervell, but in June Marshall gave Styer permission to brief Somervell on the project and to enlist his support. In September 1942, Somervell and Styer decided to strengthen the Army's control of the project, with a single officer placed in charge. The obvious candidate was Styer, but Somervell did not want to lose his chief of staff, so Colonel Leslie R. Groves Jr. (who was promoted to brigadier general) was appointed.

Groves reported to the Military Policy Committee, which consisted of Styer, Rear Admiral William R. Purnell and Vannevar Bush, the head of the Office of Scientific Research and Development (OSRD). At the Quebec Conference in May 1943, it was decided to merge the British Tube Alloys project with the Manhattan Project. Styer then became the chairman of the Combined Policy Committee, which included British and Canadian representatives. He also headed its Technical Subcommittee. The size and scope of activities of the ASF was so great that it was able to hide a project that cost nearly $2 billion (equivalent to $28 billion in 2025), built major industrial complexes, and at its peak employed 80,000 people.

== Abolished ==
On 30 August 1945, Marshall created a board head by Lieutenant General Alexander M. Patch to review the organization of the War Department. The board had no officers from the ASF staff but two came from the technical services. The board submitted its recommendations to the Chief of Staff on 18 October. These were that the technical services be continued, with the Transportation Corps made permanent, and that the Finance Department becoming an eighth technical service. There would be six administrative services: the Adjutant General's Department, the Judge Advocate General's Department, the Corps of Chaplains, the Office of the Provost Marshal General, and the Special Services Division. Their activities would be supervised by a Director of Personnel and Administration in the WDGS. The service commands would be abolished, and their functions transferred to the Armies. The ASF would also be abolished, and its staff sections transferred to the WDGS.

Eisenhower succeeded Marshall as Chief of Staff on 19 November 1945, and Somervell's retirement was announced on 26 December, effective 30 April 1946. He was succeeded as commander of ASF by Lutes on 1 January 1946. On 13 May 1946, President Harry S. Truman issued Executive Order 9722, which amended Executive Order 9082, and gave the Secretary of War thirty days "to reassign to such agencies and officers of the War Department as he may deem appropriate the functions, duties, and powers heretofore assigned to the service of supply command and to the Commanding General, Services of Supply. War Department Circular 138 abolishing ASF was issued the following day implementing the new organization, effective 11 June 1946.

The Army Service Forces was successful in terms of the mission given to it by Marshall when it was created in March 1942: it relieved him of the burden of having large numbers of people reporting to him, and gave him a single person who could handle logistics. Much of the criticism of the ASF involved the personality of Somervell, but it was his energy, drive, and determination to achieve efficiencies that made the ASF the organization that it was. In the new organization, Lutes became the Director of Service, Supply and Procurement on the WDGS. The position was later renamed the Director of Logistics. Procedures developed by the ASF remained in place. On 1 November 1948, the technical services were subordinated to the Director of Logistics, and the administrative services to the Director of Personnel and Administration.
