= Paul F. Yount =

American general (1908–1984)

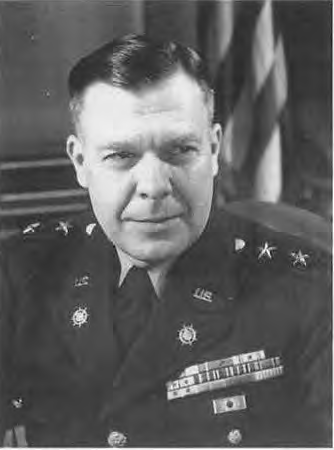
- Official portrait, 1953
- Born: 9 September 1908; Alliance, Ohio, U.S.
- Died: 28 November 1984 (aged 76); Indiana, Pennsylvania, U.S.
- Burial place: West Point Cemetery
- Children: 1
- Military career
- Allegiance: United States
- Branch: United States Army
- Service years: 1930–1958
- Rank: Major General
- Service number: O-18022
- Commands: Transportation Corps; 2nd Logistics Command; 705th Railway Grand Division; 3rd Military Railway Service; 702nd Railway Grand Division
- Conflicts: World War II; Persian Corridor; China-Burma-India Theater; Korean War
- Awards: Army Distinguished Service Medal (3); Legion of Merit (2); Commander of the Order of the British Empire (UK); Order of Homayoun (Iran); Order of Kutuzov Third Class (Union of Soviet Socialist Republics)

Paul Frailey Yount (9 September 1908 – 28 November 1984) was a United States Army general who served in World War II and the Korean War. He was the Chief of Transportation from 1954 to 1958.

Yount graduated from the United States Military Academy at West Point, New York, ranked first in the class of 1930, and obtained a degree from Cornell University. In 1940, he was attached to the Chicago, St. Paul, Minneapolis and Omaha Railway to learn about railway operations. During World War II he was part of the 1941 US Iranian Mission. In March 1942 he went to the China-Burma-India Theater (CBI), where he headed Base Section No. 1 at Karachi. He returned to Iran in November as commander of the 702nd Railway Grand Division, and took over the running of the Iranian State Railway (ISR) from the British, and increased the volume of supplies delivered over the railway fivefold. In April 1944, he went to India, where as commander of the 705th Railway Grand Division, he ran the Bengal and Assam Railway. During the Korean War he commanded the 2nd Logistical Command. Based at Pusan in South Korea, it provided logistical support for the United Nations forces fighting in Korea. He retired in 1958 and became executive vice president of Consolidated Freightways.

== Early life ==
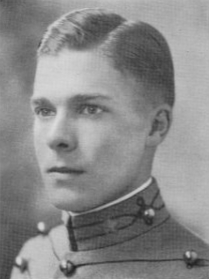
As a West Point cadet

Paul Frailey Yount was born in Alliance, Ohio, on 9 September 1908. He entered the United States Military Academy at West Point, New York, 1 July 1926. He graduated first in the class of 1930 on 12 June 1930, and was commissioned as a second lieutenant in the Corps of Engineers. He was posted to Buffalo, New York, where he carried out river and harbor work. On 19 September 1932 he entered Cornell University to study civil engineering, graduating in 1933. He completed the engineering course at the United States Army Engineer School at Fort Humphreys, Virginia in 1934, and then returned to West Point as an instructor in the civil and military engineering department. He was promoted to first lieutenant on 1 August 1935. On 13 July 1938, Yount was posted to the 3rd Engineer Regiment, which was based at Fort Shafter in the Territory of Hawaii, where he was promoted to captain on 12 June 1940.

== World War II ==
On 28 July 1940, Yount was attached to the Chicago, St. Paul, Minneapolis and Omaha Railway to learn about railway operations. He then became the adjutant of the 711th Railway Operating Battalion, which was formed on 18 June 1941. It was the first unit of its kind in the US Army and, unlike subsequent units, was not sponsored by a railway company. Its first assignment was at Fort Belvoir, Virginia, where it rehabilitated a neglected old railway on the post for use in training. It was then sent to Camp Claiborne, Louisiana, where it was tasked with the construction of a railway link to Camp Polk, Louisiana, also to be used for training. Some 6,000 engineer troops worked on the line, including the African-American 91st, 93rd and 383rd Engineer Battalions, the 98th Engineer Battalion and the 331st Engineer General Service Regiment. The link was completed on 10 July 1942.

Yount went to the Middle East on 1 October 1941 as part of the US Iranian Mission, which was headed by Colonel Raymond A. Wheeler. It was set up to support the British and Soviet Union (USSR) forces in the region, although the United States was not yet a belligerent in World War II, and the USSR did not yet qualify for Lend-Lease aid. The USSR was officially declared eligible to receive Lend-Lease on 7 November, and the United States entered the war after the Japanese attack on Pearl Harbor the following month. Yount was promoted to major on 1 February 1942. He reported on the construction effort required to build an oil pipeline network.

On 11 March he moved to the China-Burma-India Theater (CBI), where he was promoted to lieutenant colonel on 22 March 1942 and colonel on 6 May. Base Section No. 1 was activated under his command in Karachi on 27 May. It was responsible for an area encompassing 360,000 square miles (930,000 km^{2}) and 1,033 U.S. Army personnel, almost half of whom were medical personnel. There were also about 1,500 local civilians, who were employed in various roles under Reverse Lend-Lease arrangements. About 20,000 long tons (20,000 t) of Lend-Lease cargo earmarked for China had been delivered, but it had not been cataloged, sorted or safeguarded against pilferage, and in some case had not even been moved from the wharves. Yount's first task was to acquire 1,000,000 square feet (93,000 m^{2}) of open and 100,000 square feet (9,300 m^{2}) of covered storage, and over the next three months Base Section No. 1 was able to clear, catalog and store 15,000 long tons (15,000 t) Chinese Lend-Lease supplies. Between March and December, Base Section No. 1 unloaded 130,342 long tons (132,434 t) of cargo and forwarded 54,140 long tons (55,010 t) to destination in CBI. He was awarded the Legion of Merit for this service.

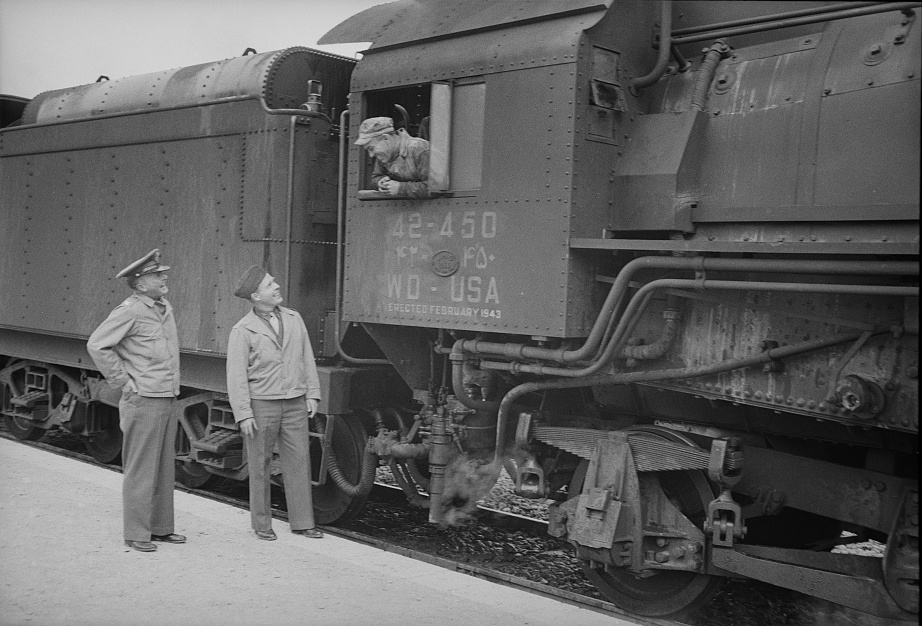
Colonel Bernard A. Johnson and Yount (right) in Iran in March 1943

On 5 October 1942, Yount arrived back in Basra, where, with a small advance party that arrived from the United States, he established the headquarters of the Military Railway Service. This was to take over the running of the Iranian State Railway (ISR) from the British . The ISR ran from Bandar Shahpur, a tidewater port on the Persian Gulf, to Bandar Shah on shores of the Caspian Sea, and before the war carried about 200 long tons (200 t) per day. By October 1942 the British had increased its capacity to 1,500 long tons (1,500 t) per day, which, while a commendable effort, still fell well short of the 6,000 long tons (6,100 t) per day that the Combined Chiefs of Staff wanted for aid to the USSR.

US railway units began arriving at Khorramshahr in December, starting with the 711th Railway Operating Battalion. It was followed by the 730th Railway Operating Battalion and the 754th and 762nd Railway Shop Battalions. A fifth battalion, the 791st Railway Operating battalion, was formed in Iran in May 1943. To control them, the headquarters of the 702nd Railway Grand Division arrived in December 1942, and Yount formally assumed command of both it and the Military Railway Service on 9 February 1943. The Military Railway Service became the 3rd Military Railway Service on 10 April 1944. By this time it controlled 4,000 men in the five battalions, along with 15,000 Iranian ISR employees. This was about the same number of personnel that the British had employed. On 3 July 1943 the 711th Railway Operation Battalion hauled 6,402 long tons (6,505 t), meeting the target set by the Combined Chiefs. Yount was awarded the Army Distinguished Service Medal.

In October 1943, Lieutenant General Brehon B. Somervell, the Commanding General of Army Service Forces, visited India, and offered to have the US Army take over the running of the Bengal and Assam Railway, which supplied the air bases forwarding supplies to China over the Hump, as the aerial route over Himalayan Mountains was called, and the engineers working on the construction of the Ledo Road to link Burma with China by road and pipeline. He summoned Yount from Iran to conduct a survey of the railway, and he reported on 10 November that more efficient operation would provide the required tonnage, obviating the need to rebuild the railway. The British accepted Somervell's offer on 6 November, and ten days later the 705th Railway Grand Division, with the 721st, 725th, 726th, 745th, and 748th Railway Operating Battalions and the 758th Railway Shop Battalion, was ordered to India, where it would come under the command of Colonel John A. Appleton.

The War Department was not satisfied with the progress made by Appleton. He was relieved of his command on 27 April 1944, and sent to the European Theater of Operations. On 17 May, Yount assumed command of the 705th Railway Grand Division, with the rank of brigadier general from 22 June 1944. That month, he accepted all bids for railway tonnage. The following month, the allocations exceeded the 22,000 short tons (20,000 t) per month target set at the Quebec Conference for 1 January 1946. In August, 16,439 wagons rolled along the railway, an average of 530 per day, compared with 327 in March. By September, the railways was carrying 6,537 long tons (6,642 t) per day, and there was still ten percent capacity to spare.

Improvements were made to bring the railways closer to American standards. Flood control measures were instituted that prevented the railway from being closed by the monsoon for the first time in thirty years. New track ballast was laid, kinks in the rails were straightened out, and low points were lifted. Buy the end of 1944, 20 percent of the line was duplicated, but just as important was the construction of passing sidings that permitted two-way traffic, which Yount persuaded the British Government of India to carry out. Rolling stock was largely acquired from the United States under Lend-Lease. By the end of the year, this include 238 locomotives and 6,500 boxcars, which were much larger than those of the railway's pre-war stock.

From 19 May to 4 September 1945, Yount commanded the Advance Section of the Services of Supply in the Burma-India Theater. He was awarded an oak leaf cluster to his Legion of Merit for this service.

== Post-war ==
Yount served as assistant Chief of the Transportation Corps from 15 October 1945 until 31 May 1949. He then became the commanding general of the New York Port of Embarkation. On 25 August 1950, after the outbreak of the Korea War, he assumed command of the 2nd Logistical Command. Based at Pusan in South Korea, it provided logistical support for the United Nations forces fighting in Korea, and was the primary agency for placing requisitions for supplies on the Japan Logistical Command. As such, he was responsible for the Geoje POW camp, where over 130,000 Korean and 20,000 Chinese prisoners were held. After a series of riots in May 1952, in which Brigadier General Francis Dodd was held hostage, Yount established a board of inquiry, which found Dodd and Brigadier General Charles F. Colson, who was sent to replace Dodd, both blameless. General James Van Fleet, commander of the U.S. Eighth Army and United Nations forces in Korea, disagreed; on his recommendation, both officers were reduced in rank to colonel, an issued an administrative reprimand to Yount.

Yount was awarded an oak leaf cluster to his Army Distinguished Service Medal. He returned to the United States, where he became the Deputy Chief of the Transportation Corps. On 1 April 1953, he became the Chief of the Transportation Corps, and was promoted to major general the following year. He served in this role until his retirement on 31 January 1958. For this service he was awarded a second oak leaf cluster to his Army Distinguished Service Medal. Other awards he had received in his career included being made an honorary Commander of the Order of the British Empire. He was awarded the Order of Homayoun by Iran and the Order of Kutuzov Third Class by the Soviet Union. After retiring from the Army, he became the executive vice president of Consolidated Freightways.

== Personal life ==
Yount married Elizabeth Reybold, the daughter of Eugene Reybold, who rose to become a lieutenant general and the Chief of Engineers. Her brother Franklin B. Reybold, graduated from the U.S. Military Academy with the class of 1935. They had a daughter, Margaret. Yount died in Indiana, Pennsylvania, on 28 November 1984, and was buried in West Point Cemetery. Copies of his speeches as Chief of Transportation are held by the US Army War College in Carlisle, Pennsylvania.

== Dates of rank ==
Insignia	Rank	Component	Date	Reference
	Second Lieutenant	Corps of Engineers	12 June 1930	
	First Lieutenant	Corps of Engineers	1 August 1935	
	Captain	Corps of Engineers	12 June 1940	
	Major	Army of the United States	1 February 1942	
	Lieutenant Colonel	Army of the United States	22 March 1942	
	Colonel	Army of the United States	6 May 1942	
	Brigadier General	Army of the United States	22 June 1944	
	Major	Corps of Engineers	12 June 1947	
	Lieutenant Colonel	Corps of Engineers	8 June 1948	
	Colonel	Corps of Engineers	10 June 1948	
	Major General	Army of the United States	1 August 1949	
	Colonel	Transportation Corps	28 July 1950	
	Major General	Transportation Corps	25 January 1954	
	Major General	Retired List	31 January 1958	
