= Russel Burton Reynolds =

United States Army general

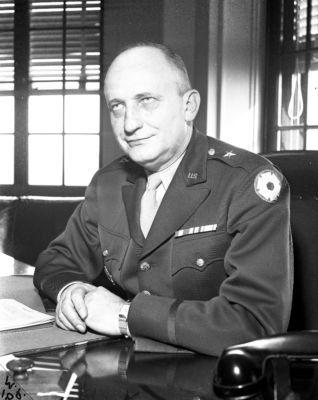
- Born: December 24, 1894; Dundee, Michigan, US
- Died: December 7, 1970 (aged 75)
- Burial place: Arlington National Cemetery
- Military career
- Allegiance: United States of America
- Branch: United States Army
- Service years: 1917–1949
- Rank: Major general
- Service number: 0-8368
- Unit: Chief of Special Service Division
- Conflicts: World War I World War II
- Awards: Distinguished Service Medal (2)

Russel Burton Reynolds (December 24, 1894 – December 7, 1970) was a major general in the United States Army. During World War II, he served as a Director of Military Personnel Division of the Army Service Forces.

== Biography ==
Reynolds was born on December 24, 1894, to Sydney and Nellie Reynolds in Dundee, Michigan. He would attend the University of Wisconsin-Madison. On January 12, 1918, he married Florine Janney. Reynolds died on December 8, 1970, and is buried with Florine at Arlington National Cemetery.

== Military career ==
Reynolds originally joined the Army in 1917 and was commissioned as 2nd Lieutenant. He would serve as Assistant Professor of Military Science and Tactics at the University of Pennsylvania from 1925 to 1929 and at Ripon College from 1936 to 1937. From 1929 to 1933 he served as an instructor at the United States Army Infantry School.

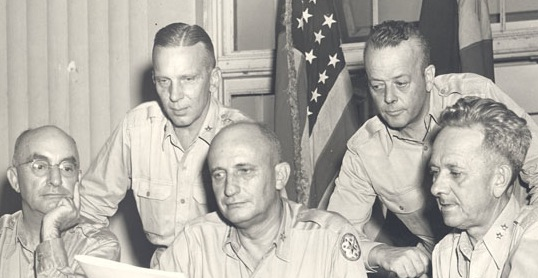
The Yamashita Trial Commission. From left to right: Major General Leo Donovan, Brigadier General Morris C. Harwerk, Major General Russel B. Reynolds, Brigadier General Egbert F. Bullens, and Major General James A. Lester

During World War II he was Director of the Military Personnel Division of the Army Service Forces. Following the war he presided over the commission that tried Tomoyuki Yamashita. Later he would serve as Chief of Special Service of the United States Department of the Army.

== Decorations ==
Awards he received include the Army Distinguished Service Medal with oak leaf cluster, World War I Victory Medal, American Defense Service Medal, American Campaign Medal, Asiatic-Pacific Campaign Medal and World War II Victory Medal.
