= LeRoy Lutes =

United States Army general (1890–1980)

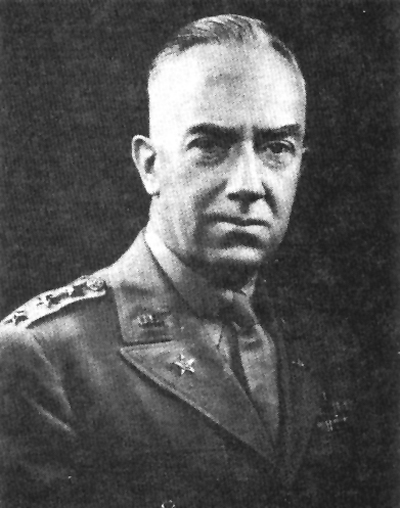
- Born: October 4, 1890; Cairo, Illinois, U.S.
- Died: January 30, 1980 (aged 89)
- Burial place: Arlington National Cemetery
- Military career
- Allegiance: United States of America
- Branch: United States Army
- Service years: 1906–1952
- Rank: Lieutenant general
- Commands: Fourth United States Army
- Conflicts: World War I World War II
- Awards: Distinguished Service Medal (2); Legion of Merit; Bronze Star Medal

Lieutenant general LeRoy Lutes (October 4, 1890 – January 30, 1980) was a decorated American military officer who was in critical staff and supply positions during and after World War II. His last assignment was a commanding general of the Fourth United States Army.

== Early years ==
LeRoy Lutes was born on October 4, 1890, in Cairo, Illinois. Lutes attended the Wentworth Military Academy in Lexington, Missouri, and joined the Illinois National Guard in 1906. Lutes was commissioned a second lieutenant in the Regular Army on March 21, 1917, while serving on the Mexican border.

After the war, Lutes was transferred to the U.S. Army Coast Artillery Corps and also attended the advanced course at Coast Artillery School at Fort Monroe in Hampton, Virginia. Subsequently, Lutes also attended the Command and General Staff College at Fort Leavenworth, Kansas, where he earned more military knowledges.

In July 1935, Lutes was transferred to the National Guard Bureau in Washington, D.C., where he served until the end of June 1939.

== Second World War ==
In January 1940 he became chief of logistic and also assistant chief of staff of the Third Army in Atlanta under the command of Lieutenant General Herbert J. Brees. Lutes participated in the Louisiana Maneuvers in 1940–1941. Brehon Somervell, impressed with Lutes' talents as a staff officer, helped advance his career. Lutes was appointed Director of Operations, Headquarters Services of Supply in 1942. In succession he became acting chief of staff, Headquarters, Army Service Forces; chief of staff and deputy to the commanding general, Army Service Forces; and on January 1, 1946, commanding general, Army Service Forces. On June 11, 1946, he was assigned to Gen. Dwight D. Eisenhower's general staff as director of the Service, Supply and Procurement Division. In 1947 he became director of staff of the Munitions Board, and in 1949 he was made commanding general of the Fourth Army. He retired from the Army in 1952. In 1955 he was appointed to a committee to advise the Office of Defense Mobilization on the availability of commodities related to national defense.

For his services during World War II and its aftermath, Lutes received the Army Distinguished Service Medal with the Bronze Oak Leaf Cluster, Legion of Merit and Bronze Star Medal.

== Family life ==
Lutes married four times; his wives were Martha M. Mulvihill (1893–1953), Charlotte Townsend Lutes (1902–1955), Mildred Speas Lutes (1911–1966, and Helen Kinney Lutes (1912–2011). His son LeRoy Lutes Jr. (1914–1992) graduated from West Point and was a US Army colonel who received the Army Distinguished Service Medal, for service in Vietnam.

Lutes and his family members are buried at Arlington National Cemetery.

== Decorations ==
Here is the ribbon bar of Lieutenant general LeRoy Lutes:

1st Row	Army Distinguished Service Medal with Oak Leaf Cluster		Legion of Merit	Bronze Star Medal	
2nd Row	Army Commendation Medal	Mexican Border Service Medal		World War I Victory Medal	American Defense Service Medal with Clasp
3rd Row	American Campaign Medal	Asiatic-Pacific Campaign Medal with four Service Stars		European-African-Middle Eastern Campaign Medal with three Service Stars	World War II Victory Medal
4th Row	Army of Occupation Medal	National Defense Service Medal		Antarctica Service Medal	Honorary Commander of the Order of the British Empire
