= Dwight Johns =

United States Army general

Dwight Frederick Johns
- Brigadier General Dwight F. Johns
- Born: 16 May 1894; Rockford, Illinois
- Died: 8 November 1977 (aged 83)
- Military career
- Allegiance: United States
- Branch: United States Army
- Service years: 1916–1949
- Rank: Brigadier General
- Commands: Pacific Engineer Division; Engineer School; Advance Base, New Guinea; COSC; 21st Engineers; St Paul Engineer District; 8th Engineers
- Conflicts: Pancho Villa Expedition; World War I; World War II Dutch East Indies campaign Kokoda Track campaign Battle of Buna-Gona Salamaua-Lae campaign Huon Peninsula campaign
- Awards: Distinguished Service Medal; Legion of Merit

Brigadier General Dwight Frederick Johns (16 May 1894 – 8 November 1977) was an American soldier and general in the first half of the 20th century. He is best known for his service in the South West Pacific Area during World War II, where he headed the Advance Base and the Combined Operations Service Command during the Kokoda Track campaign and the Battle of Buna-Gona. He later commanded the Advance Base at Lae and Finschhafen, and the Engineer School at Fort Belvoir. After the war he headed the Pacific Engineer Division, where he was responsible for a number of important flood control and irrigation projects.

== Education and early life ==
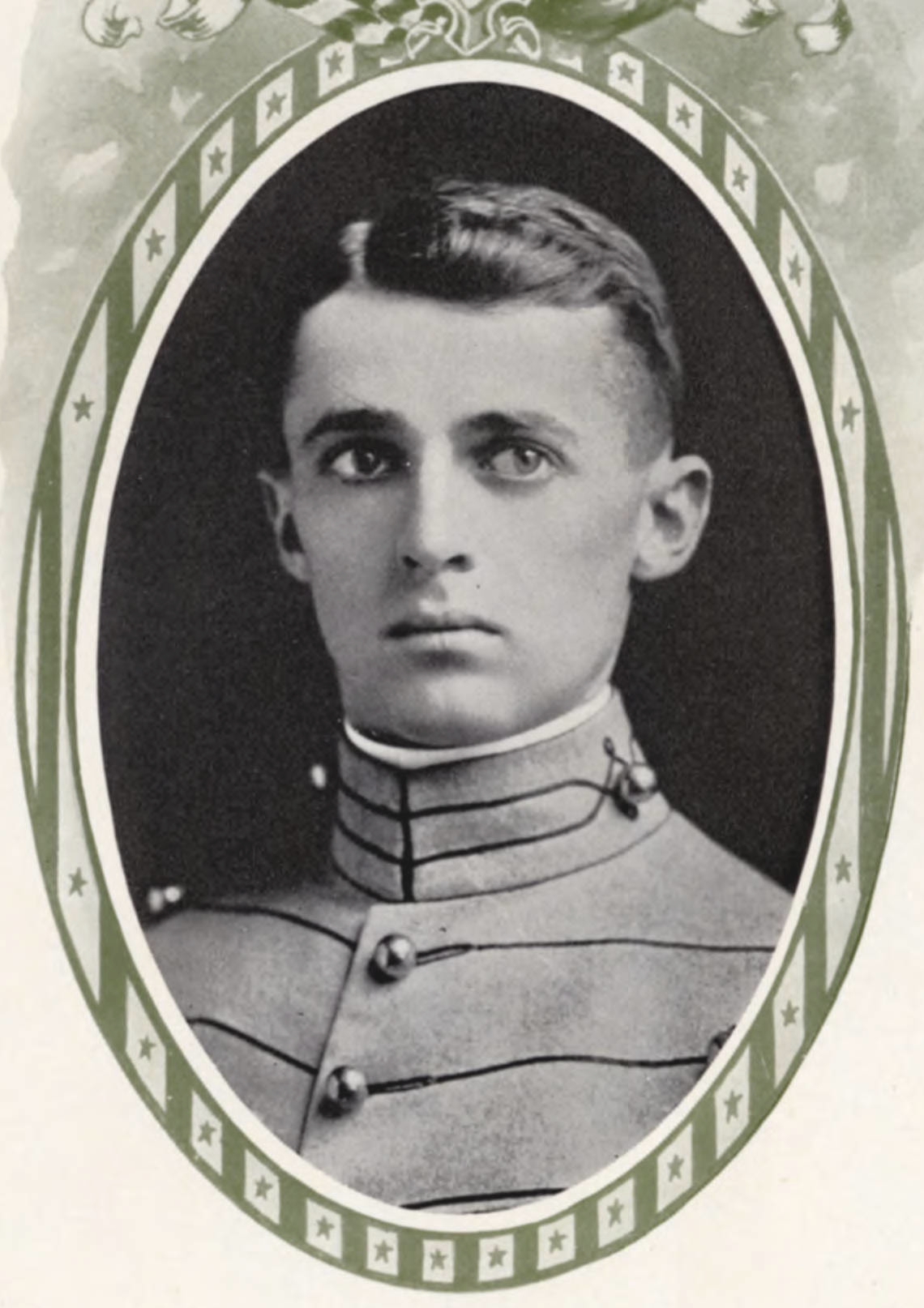
At West Point in 1916

Dwight Frederick Johns was born in Rockford, Illinois on 16 May 1894. He entered the United States Military Academy at West Point, New York as an appointee from Illinois in 1912 and graduated sixth of 125 in the class of 1916. He was commissioned as a second lieutenant in the United States Army Corps of Engineers in June 1916.

== World War I ==
Johns initially served at the United States Military Academy as an instructor in the Department of Tactics but in July 1916 he was posted to the 1st Battalion of Mounted Engineers on the Mexican Border. He served with the Pancho Villa Expedition from November 1916 to February 1917, when the 8th Engineers returned to El Paso, Texas. Johns was promoted to captain in May 1917 and major in May 1918. He commanded the 8th Engineers from April to August 1918. Returning to the United States Military Academy in August 1918, he became an instructor in drawing from August to December 1918, and in Tactics from November to December 1918. From December 1918 to mid-1919 he was an instructor in mathematics.

== Between the wars ==
Like most officers in the aftermath of World War I, Johns was reduced in rank to his substantive rank of captain in August 1919, but was promoted to major again in February 1921. In June 1921 he entered the Massachusetts Institute of Technology, from which he graduated in June 1922 with a Bachelor of Science degree, majoring in civil engineering. He then became Assistant District Engineer of the Detroit River and Harbour District. In 1924 he was posted to the 11th Engineers, based in the Panama Canal Zone. He returned to the United States in 1927 to take up an appointment in the Office of the Chief of Engineers. From 1931 to 1933 he was a student at the Command and General Staff College at Fort Leavenworth. After graduating, he became District Engineer at St Paul, Minnesota. On 1 July 1937, he was promoted to lieutenant colonel. He attended the U.S. Army War College from 1937 to 1938, then became at instructor at the Command and General Staff College.

== World War II ==
In 1940 Johns became commanding officer of the 21st Engineers. The 21st Engineers were assigned the task of investigating techniques for the rapid construction of air bases. As such, Johns was involved in the development of a number of new construction techniques, most notably the use of Marston Mat.

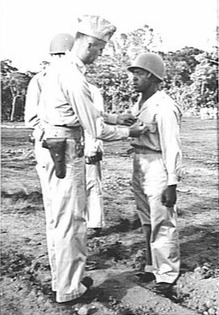
Brigadier General Dwight F. Johns (left) decorates Private 1st Class Julius Franklin, who dived into a river and swam through burning petrol and exploding ammunition to rescue a fighter pilot whose plane had crashed into a river in New Guinea.

His expertise in airbase construction led to Johns being sent to the South West Pacific as Chief Engineer, American Forces in Java. Departing Washington, D.C. by air on 14 January 1942, Johns arrived in Surabaya nine days later. His first mission was to provide airfield facilities on Java for 2,000 aircraft. Tapping into the vast resources of labour available in one of the world's most densely populated regions, Johns set about readying the required airfields. However, Java was captured by the Japanese before the aircraft arrived.

Johns reached Australia on 28 February 1942 and became Chief Engineer, United States Army Forces in Australia (USAFIA), with the rank of brigadier general. As such, Johns represented the US Army on the Allied Works Council, the body controlling and coordinating all construction activities in Australia. With the arrival in Australia of General Douglas MacArthur, Brigadier General Hugh John Casey, who had accompanied MacArthur from the Philippines, became Chief Engineer at General Headquarters (GHQ), South West Pacific Area (SWPA). Johns, who was in an earlier class at West Point than Casey, remained Chief of Engineers, USAFIA until 25 May 1942, when he became Chief of Staff of US Army Services of Supply (USASOS).

When the Kokoda Track campaign became mired in logistical difficulties, MacArthur and General Sir Thomas Blamey agreed to establish a Combined Operations Service Command (COSC) under New Guinea Force to co-ordinate logistical activities in Papua-New Guinea. Johns was designated commander of both COSC and the Advance Base, New Guinea on 8 October 1942. He was given an Australian deputy, Brigadier Victor Secombe, a Royal Australian Engineers officer. All Australian and American logistical units were placed under COSC but Johns chose to exercise command of the Australian units through Secombe. They built an organization that "was a radical departure from that which the Australian Army considered normal administrative procedure, but was adequately to meet the novel demands of a campaign in a country lacking roads and railways, in which all transport had to be by sea or air, and in which often the administrative or base areas coincided with the operational areas." Johns later wrote that:

[COSC] had the responsibility – and the authority – to get the maximum utilization out of what means were available. The commander of COSC had the authority, with the approval of GOC New Guinea Force, to call on the local commanders of the Allied Ground Forces, Air Forces, Naval Forces or United States Army Services of Supply for such means as were available to assist in meeting any service problem. GHQ directive provided that such local commander, when called upon, "will furnish". Therein lay the authority of COSC.

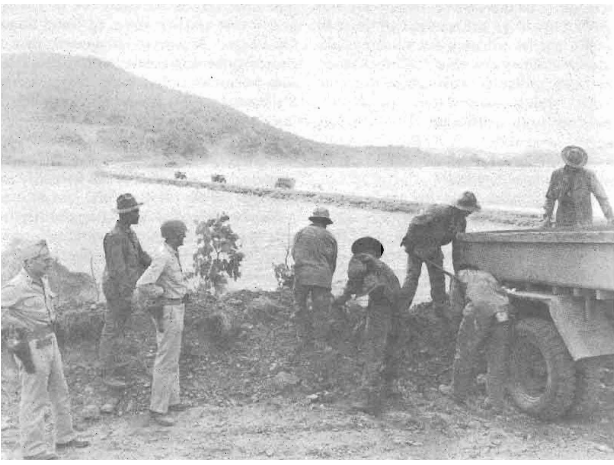
The Tatana Island Causeway, looking towards Tatana Island. Brigadier General Dwight F. Johns is third from the left.

Johns impressed Australian officers with his sensitive handling of inter-Allied issues, his co-operative nature, and his ability to get the job done. Lieutenant General Edmund Herring, who came to regard Johns as a close friend, later described Johns and Secombe as "born co-operators." One of Johns' most important decisions involved the construction of a new deep-water berth for Liberty ships at Tatana Island. This involved building a causeway out to the island. The project would double the capacity of the port of Port Moresby, but to build it Johns had to divert the African-American 96th Engineers from work on the airfields around Port Moresby, raising fears from airmen like Brigadier General Ennis Whitehead that the airfields would not be ready for all-weather operations by the time that the rainy season arrived. Rains in late October did indeed close three airfields but the causeway opened on 30 October and the wharf accepted its first ship on 3 November.

Johns relinquished his roles in Papua and resumed his former post at USASOS in March 1943, being replaced by Brigadier General Hanford MacNider. In turn, he replaced MacNider as GHQ Coordinator, Milne Bay in October 1943. As such, he was responsible for all logistical activities at what was now the major US base in Papua-New Guinea. On 15 December 1943, he became Coordinator, Finschhafen. Finschhafen was destined to become the new hub of US activity in Papua-New Guinea; but an enormous amount of work was required to get the base ready for action. For his service in New Guinea, Johns was awarded the Distinguished Service Medal.

In 1944, Johns became commandant of the Engineer School at Fort Belvoir. The wartime Engineer School was responsible for the training of officers. Some were engineers in civilian life who were trained as officers; other were officers transferred from other arms who were given training in engineering subjects. The Officer Candidate School (OCS) prepared enlisted men for commissioning as officers. There had been strong criticism of the content of training courses from SWPA, where it was the norm for machinery to be operated around the clock and for engineer officers to supervise all manner of construction tasks. The commanders there felt that the training courses taught by the Engineer School were concentrating too much on leadership in combat, and not enough on technical matters, such the operation and maintenance of construction equipment. Johns reformed the curriculum, but by this time it was too late for the changes to have much effect in the overseas theaters of operations. For his work at Fort Belvoir, Johns was awarded the Legion of Merit.

== Later life ==
Johns was Assistant Chief of Engineers for Military Operations from June 1945 to March 1947. He reverted to his permanent rank of colonel in March 1946. In June 1947 Johns became commander of the Pacific Engineer Division, based in San Francisco, responsible for the southern half of the Pacific coast. As such he was involved with a number of important construction projects, including the Sacramento Deep Water Ship Channel, the Folsom Dam, the Isabella Dam, the Pine Flat Lake, and the Merced River projects. Johns retired from the army as a brigadier general on 31 December 1949. In retirement, Johns was awarded the Gold Medal from the Society of American Military Engineers in 1950, and served as its president in 1953. Johns maintained the wartime friendships he had made, and with his wife Laura he entertained Australian general Sir Edmund Herring in their home in Piedmont, California in 1967. Johns died on 8 November 1977.
