= List of engineers educated at the United States Military Academy =

Logo of the US Army Corps of Engineers

The United States Military Academy (USMA) is an undergraduate college in West Point, New York that educates and commissions officers for the United States Army. This list is drawn from alumni of the Military Academy who are engineers. Most of the U.S. Army's Chiefs of Engineers were Academy alumni; beginning with Joseph Gardner Swift (class of 1802) and most recently the current Chief of Engineers, Robert L. Van Antwerp, Jr. (class of 1972). Other notable engineers include Orlando Metcalfe Poe (class of 1856), a lighthouse engineer, and George Washington Goethals (class of 1880), chief engineer of the Panama Canal.

== Engineers ==
Note: "Class year" refers to the class year of each alumnus, which usually is the same year the person graduated. However, in times of war, classes often graduate early.

| Name | Class year | Notability | References |
|---|---|---|---|
| Joseph Gardner Swift | 1802 | Brigadier general; first graduate of the Academy; War of 1812; Superintendent of the Academy (1812–1814); Chief of Engineers (1812–1818) | |
| Walker Keith Armistead | 1803 | Brigadier general; War of 1812; Chief of Engineers (1818–1821) | |
| Joseph Gilbert Totten | 1805 | Major general; War of 1812, Mexican–American War, American Civil War; military and lighthouse engineer; Chief of Engineers (1838–1864) | |
| Charles Gratiot | 1806 | Brigadier general; War of 1812; Chief of Engineers (1828–1838) | |
| Richard Delafield | 1818 | Major general; 7th, 11th, and 13th Superintendent of the Academy (1838–1845), (1856–1861), (1861); American Civil War; Chief of Engineers (1864–1866) | |
| George Washington Whistler | 1819 | Major (United States); Chief Engineer that constructed the railroad between St. Petersburg and Moscow, Russia (1842); Received the Order of St. Anne from the Czar Nicholas (1847); father of the painter James Abbott McNeill Whistler (1834) | |
| Isaac R. Trimble | 1822 | Major General CSA; civil and railroad engineer; wounded and captured at the Battle of Gettysburg | |
| George S. Greene | 1823 | Brigadier general; second cousin of General Nathanael Greene of the American Revolutionary War; railroad and aqueduct engineer, founder of American Society of Civil Engineers and Architects; defender of Culp's Hill during the Battle of Gettysburg | |
| Washington Hood | 1827 | Captain; topographical engineer; worked with Robert E. Lee to survey the border between Ohio and Michigan in 1835 | |
| Andrew A. Humphreys | 1831 | Major general; American Civil War; topographical and hydrological surveyor of the Mississippi River Delta; Chief of Engineers (1866–1875); an incorporator of the United States National Academy of Sciences | |
| Herman Haupt | 1835 | Brigadier general; railroad engineer and head of the United States Military Railroad during the American Civil War | |
| John Williams Gunnison | 1837 | Captain; topographical engineer; supervised one of the Pacific Railroad surveys in 1853; Gunnison, Colorado and Gunnison, Utah are named in his honor | |
| Horatio Wright | 1841 | Major general; American Civil War; Chief of Engineers (1879–1884) | |
| John Newton | 1842 | Brigadier general; American Civil War; coastal fortifications engineer; Chief of Engineers (1884–1886) | |
| John Pope | 1842 | Major general; topographic engineer and surveyor; Dakota War of 1862, Apache Wars; defeated at the Second Battle of Bull Run, commander of Army of the Mississippi and Army of Virginia | |
| William F. Raynolds | 1843 | Colonel; topographic engineer; Mexican–American War; American Civil War; lighthouse construction, led 1859–1860 Raynolds Expedition in Yellowstone region. | |
| James Chatham Duane | 1848 | Brigadier general; leader of engineers in the Utah War of 1858; American Civil War; coastal fortifications and pontoon engineer; Chief of Engineers (1886–1888) | |
| Robert S. Williamson | 1848 | Lieutenant colonel; American Civil War; topographical engineer; participated in the Pacific Railroad Surveys | |
| John Parke | 1849 | Major general; American Civil War; participated in the Pacific Railroad surveys in 1853; chief surveyor who delineated the boundary between northwestern United States and British North America; Superintendent of the Academy (1887–1889) | |
| Rufus Saxton | 1849 | Brigadier general; recipient of the Medal of Honor for his defense at the Battle of Harpers Ferry; participated in the Pacific Railroad surveys in 1853; early abolitionist | |
| Gouverneur K. Warren | 1850 | Major general; commended at the battle of Little Round Top, Chief of Engineers of the Army of the Potomac during the American Civil War; participated in topographical and railroad explorations of the Mississippi River and trans-Mississippi West | |
| Thomas Lincoln Casey | 1852 | Brigadier general; American Civil War; fortifications engineer; construction engineer of the Washington Monument and Old Executive Office Building; Chief of Engineers (1888–1895) | |
| William Price Craighill | 1853 | Brigadier general; American Civil War; fortifications, river, harbor, and coastal engineer; author; Chief of Engineers (1895–1897) | |
| Orlando Metcalfe Poe | 1856 | Brigadier general; American Civil War; lighthouse, harbor, and river engineer; responsible for much of the early lighthouse construction on the Great Lakes; built the Poe Lock of the Soo Locks in Sault Ste. Marie, Michigan; Poe Reef Light in Lake Huron is named in his honor | |
| Henry Martyn Robert | 1857 | Brigadier general; Pig War; American Civil War; fortifications, river, and harbor engineer; wrote Robert's Rules of Order; Chief of Engineers (1901) | |
| John Moulder Wilson | 1860 | Brigadier general; recipient of the Medal of Honor for his actions at the Battle of Malvern Hill despite acute illness; Superintendent of the Academy (1889–1893); Chief of Engineers (1897–1901) | |
| John W. Barlow | 1861 | Brigadier general; American Civil War; participated in topographical explorations of the headwaters of the Missouri River and Yellowstone River; Chief of Engineers (1901) | |
| George Lewis Gillespie, Jr. | 1862 | Brigadier general; recipient of the Medal of Honor for carrying dispatches under withering fire at the Battle of Cold Harbor; fortification and pontoon engineer; Chief of Engineers (1901–1904) | |
| David Porter Heap | 1864 | Brigadier general; engineer and author; harbor and lighthouse engineer | |
| Alexander Mackenzie | 1864 | Major general; American Civil War; torpedo, river, and harbor engineer; Chief of Engineers (1904–1908) | |
| William Louis Marshall | 1868 | Brigadier general; topographic and river engineer; Chief of Engineers (1908–1910) | |
| William Herbert Bixby | 1873 | Brigadier general; coastal and river engineer; Chief of Engineers (1910–1913) | |
| William Trent Rossell | 1873 | Brigadier general; fortification, harbor and river engineer; Chief of Engineers (1913) | |
| Dan Christie Kingman | 1875 | Brigadier general; fortification, harbor and river engineer; Chief of Engineers (1913–1916) | |
| William Murray Black | 1877 | Major general; Spanish–American War; civil engineer; Chief of Engineers (1917–1919) | |
| George Washington Goethals | 1880 | Major general; chief engineer of the Panama Canal; Governor of the Panama Canal Zone (1914–1917) | |
| Lansing Hoskins Beach | 1882 | Major general; river, harbor, and coastal engineer; Chief of Engineers (1920–1924) | |
| Harry Taylor | 1884 | Major general; World War I; fortification, river, and harbor engineer; Chief of Engineers (1924–1926) | |
| Edgar Jadwin | 1890 | Major general; Spanish–American War; World War I; river, bridge, and road engineer; Chief of Engineers (1926–1929) | |
| Lytle Brown | 1898 | Major general; Spanish–American War; Pancho Villa Expedition; World War I; civil engineer; Chief of Engineers (1929–1933) | |
| Edward Murphy Markham | 1899 | Major general; World War I; topographic and civil engineer; Chief of Engineers (1933–1937) | |
| Julian Larcombe Schley | 1903 | Major general; World War I; topographic and civil engineer; Governor of the Panama Canal Zone (1932–1926); Chief of Engineers (1937–1941) | |
| Raymond Albert Wheeler | 1911 | Lieutenant general; World War II; railroad and highway engineer; Chief of Engineers (1945–1949); directed the clearing of the Suez Canal following the 1956 Suez Crisis | |
| Lunsford E. Oliver | 1913 | Major general; initiated the research that led to the development of the steel treadway bridge; Commander of 5th Armored Division during World War II | |
| Hugh John Casey | 1918 | Major general; instructor and engineer company commander during World War I; Chief Engineer for General of the Army Douglas MacArthur for the South West Pacific theatre of World War II; initial designer of The Pentagon; father of Major Hugh Boyd Casey; father-in-law of Major General Frank Butner Clay | |
| Samuel D. Sturgis III | 1918 | Lieutenant general; World War II; railroad and highway engineer; Chief of Engineers (1953–1956) | |
| Emerson C. Itschner | 1924 | Lieutenant general; World War II; Korean War; civil engineer; Chief of Engineers (1956–1961) | |
| Walter K. Wilson, Jr. | 1929 | Lieutenant general; World War II; Chief of Engineers (1961–1965) | |
| William F. Cassidy | 1931 | Lieutenant general; World War II; airfield engineer and engineer logistician; Chief of Engineers (1965–1969) | |
| Frederick J. Clarke | 1937 | Lieutenant general; World War II; airfield engineer, engineer logistician, and early developer of the Red Ball Express; worked on the Manhattan Project; Chief of Engineers (1969–1973) | |
| William C. Gribble, Jr. | 1941 | Lieutenant general; World War II; civil and nuclear engineer; worked on the Alaska Highway; Chief of Engineers (1973–1976) | |
| John W. Morris | 1943 | Lieutenant general; World War II, Korean War, Vietnam War; airfield and river engineer; Chief of Engineers (1976–1980) | |
| Joseph K. Bratton | 1948 | Lieutenant general; Korean War, Vietnam War; Chief of Engineers (1980–1984) | |
| Fidel V. Ramos | 1950 | General; Korean War, Vietnam War; master's degree in civil engineering at the University of Illinois (1951); Chief of Staff of the United Nations engineering contingent during the Vietnam War | |
| Elvin R. Heiberg III | 1953 | Lieutenant general; Vietnam War; held three Master's degrees; Chief of Engineers (1984–1988) | |
| Henry J. Hatch | 1957 | Lieutenant general; Vietnam War; Paratrooper and Army Ranger; Chief of Engineers (1988–1992) | |
| Robert L. Van Antwerp, Jr. | 1972 | Lieutenant general; Gulf War; Paratrooper and Army ranger; Chief of Engineers (2007–present) | |

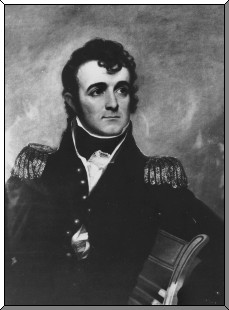
Joseph Gardner Swift

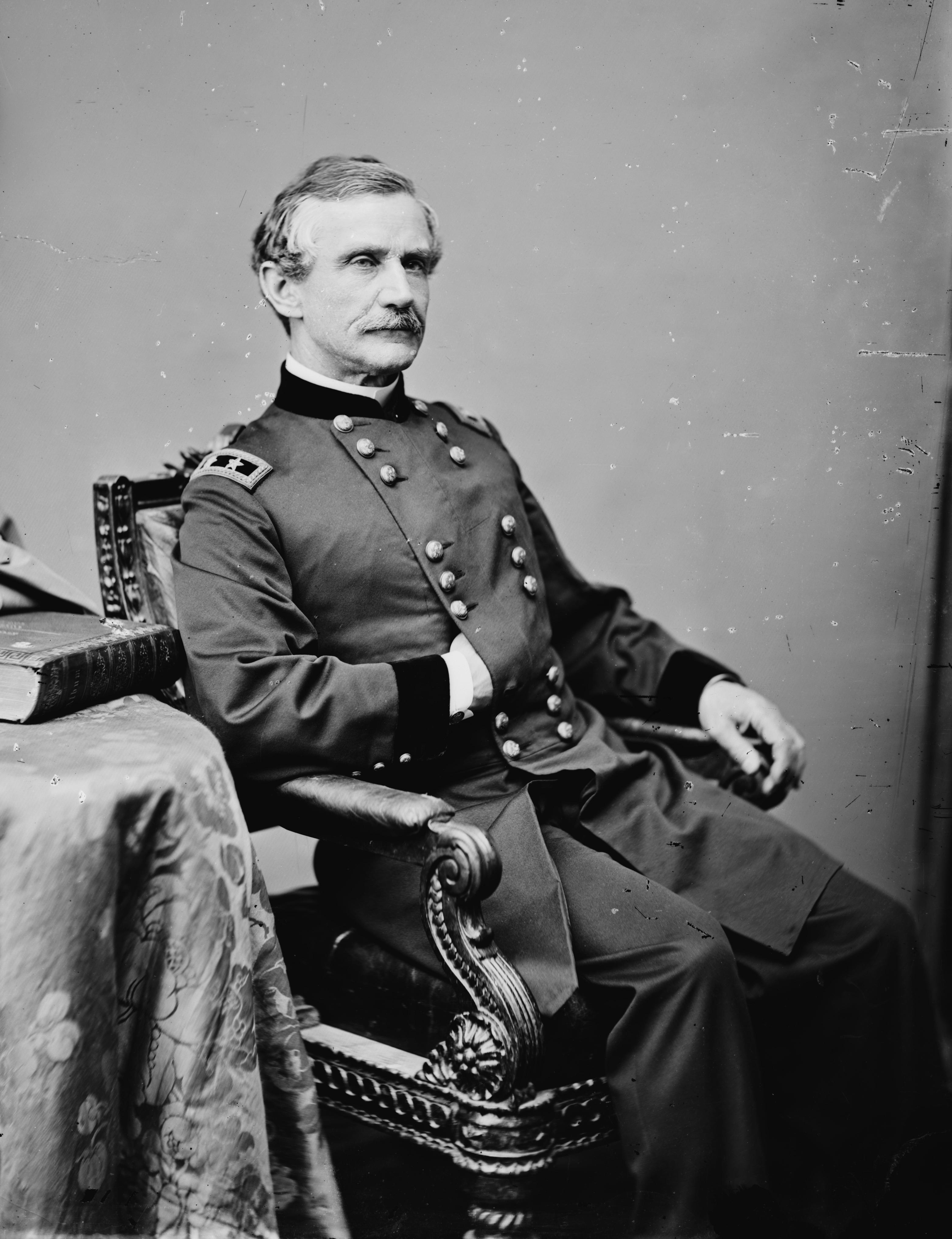
Andrew Humphreys

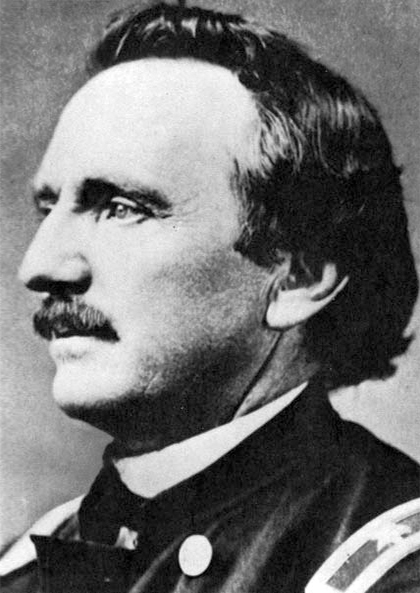
William F. Raynolds

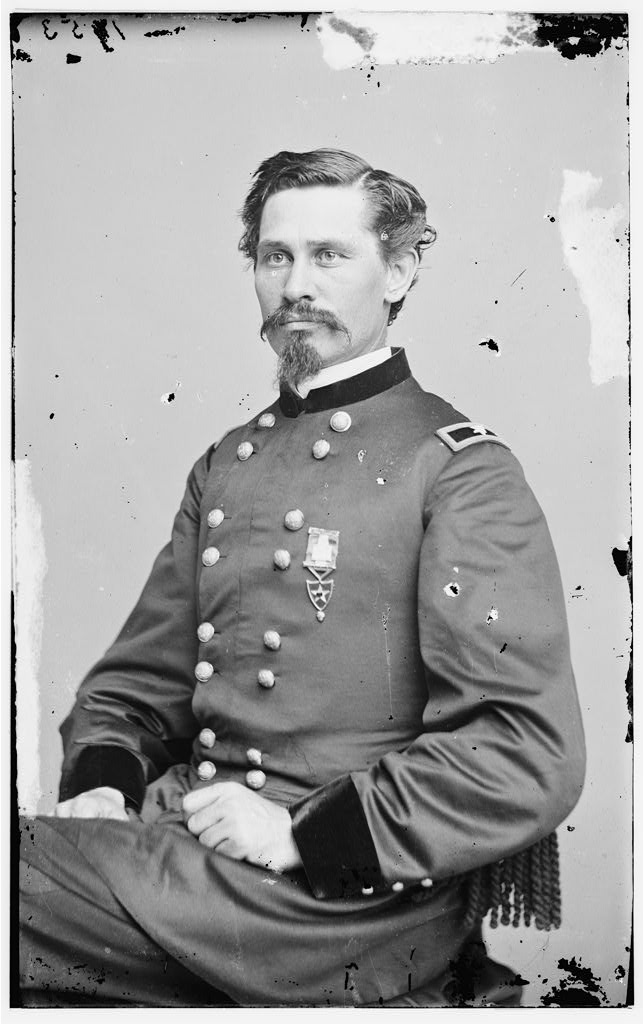
Orlando Metcalfe Poe

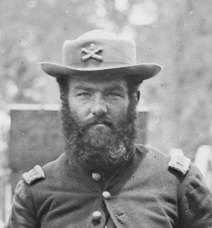
John Moulder Wilson

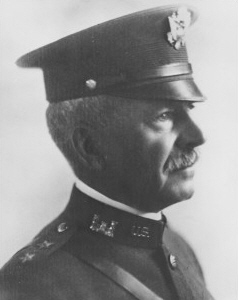
Lansing Hoskins Beach

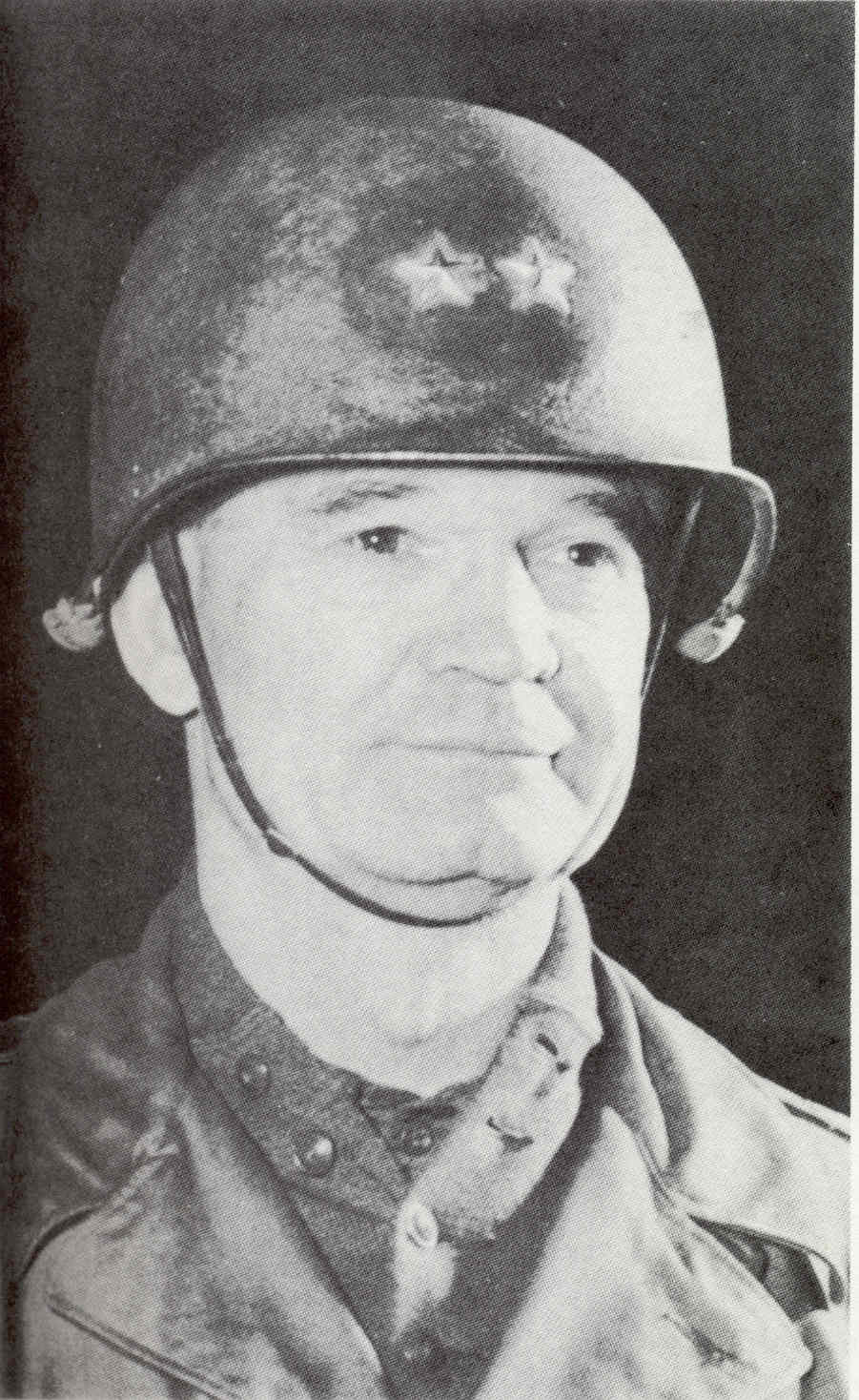
Lunsford E. Oliver

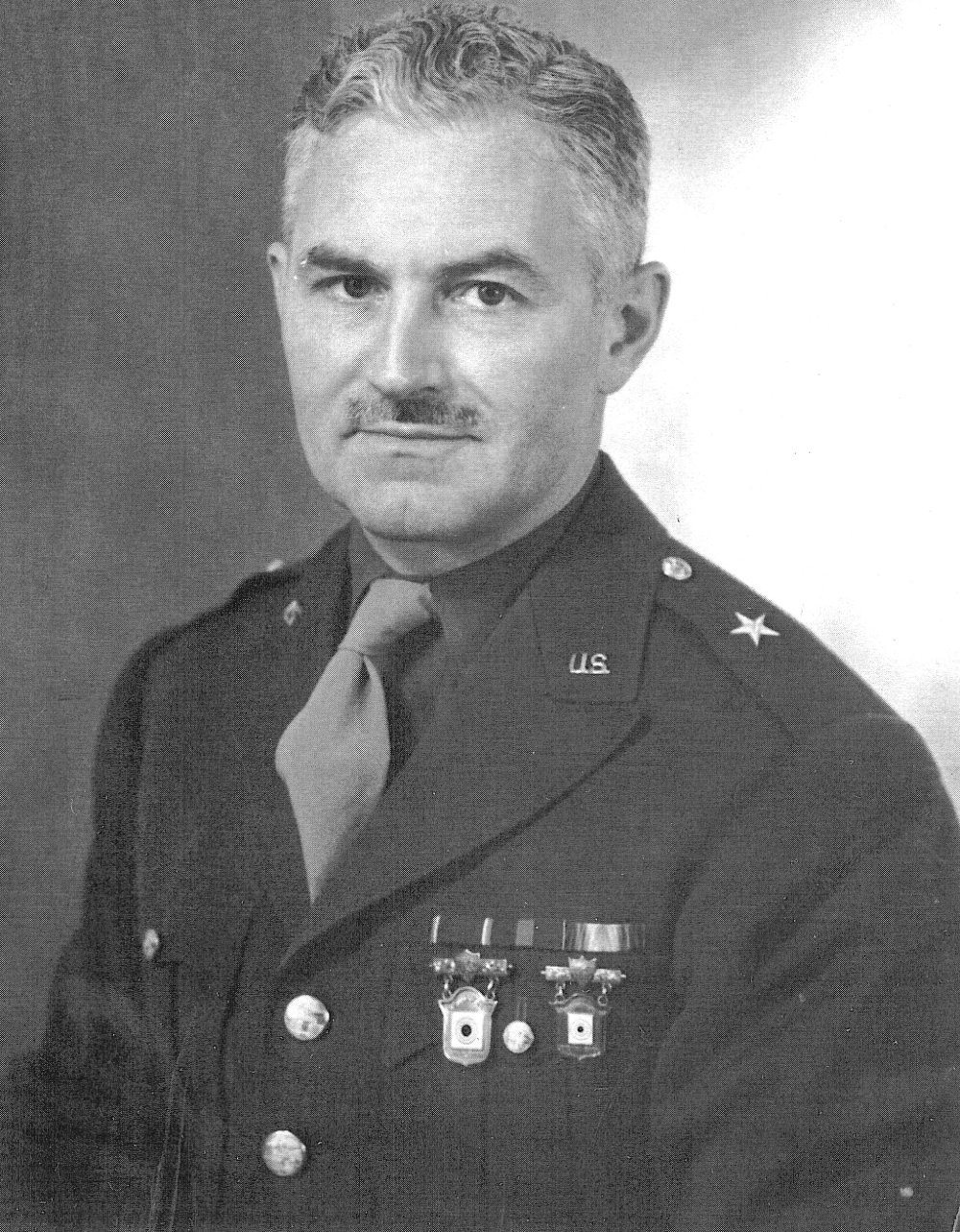
Hugh John Casey

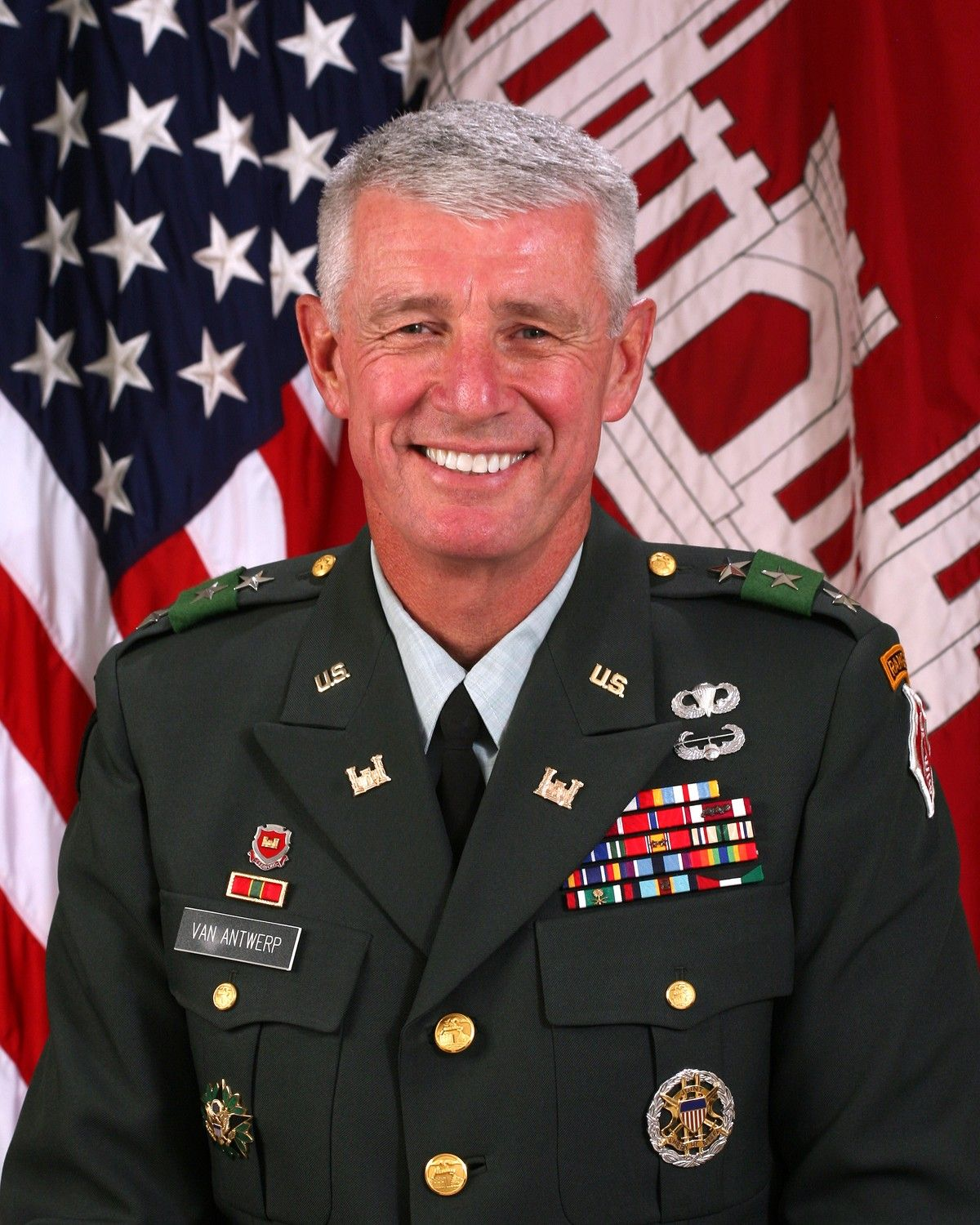
Robert Van Antwerp
