= Golden Gate Canyon =

Canyon in Yellowstone National Park

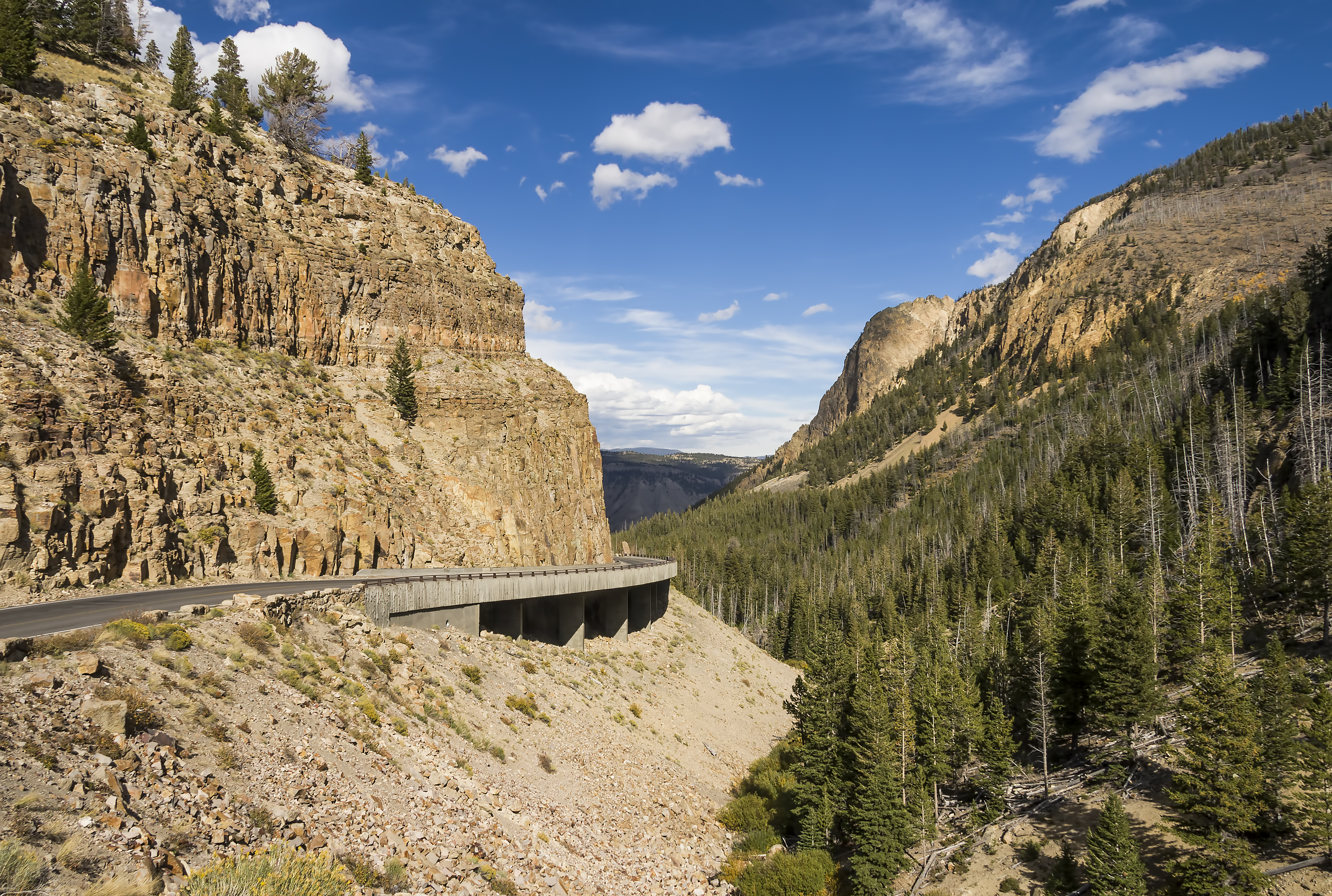
- Looking north into Golden Gate Canyon
- Floor elevation: 6,496 feet (1,980 m)

Geography
- Location: Yellowstone National Park, Park County, Wyoming
- Coordinates: 44°56′12″N 110°43′21″W
- Interactive map of Golden Gate Canyon

Golden Gate Canyon is in the northwestern region of Yellowstone National Park in the U.S. state of Wyoming. Glen Creek flows north through the canyon en route to the Gardner River descending from 7,400 feet (2,300 m) at Kingman Pass to just under 6,000 feet (1,800 m) in less than 3 miles (4.8 km). The northern portion of the Grand Loop Road traverses the canyon, connecting Mammoth Hot Springs with park features to the south.

A road was first built through the Golden Gate in 1884–85, replacing a steep, difficult road over Snow Pass. The construction was directed by U.S. Army Lieutenant Dan Christie Kingman. The canyon's name Golden Gate was first documented by Kingman in his reports to the Departments of the Army and Interior as what visitors to the park called the canyon and pass because of the yellow hue of the rocks in the area. The work included a wooden trestle where a cliff face precluded grading. In 1900 the viaduct was rebuilt as a concrete structure under the supervision of Captain Hiram M. Chittenden. Chittenden's viaduct was replaced in turn in 1930–34, the outcome of a program to widen the road. The widened viaduct was itself replaced in 1977.

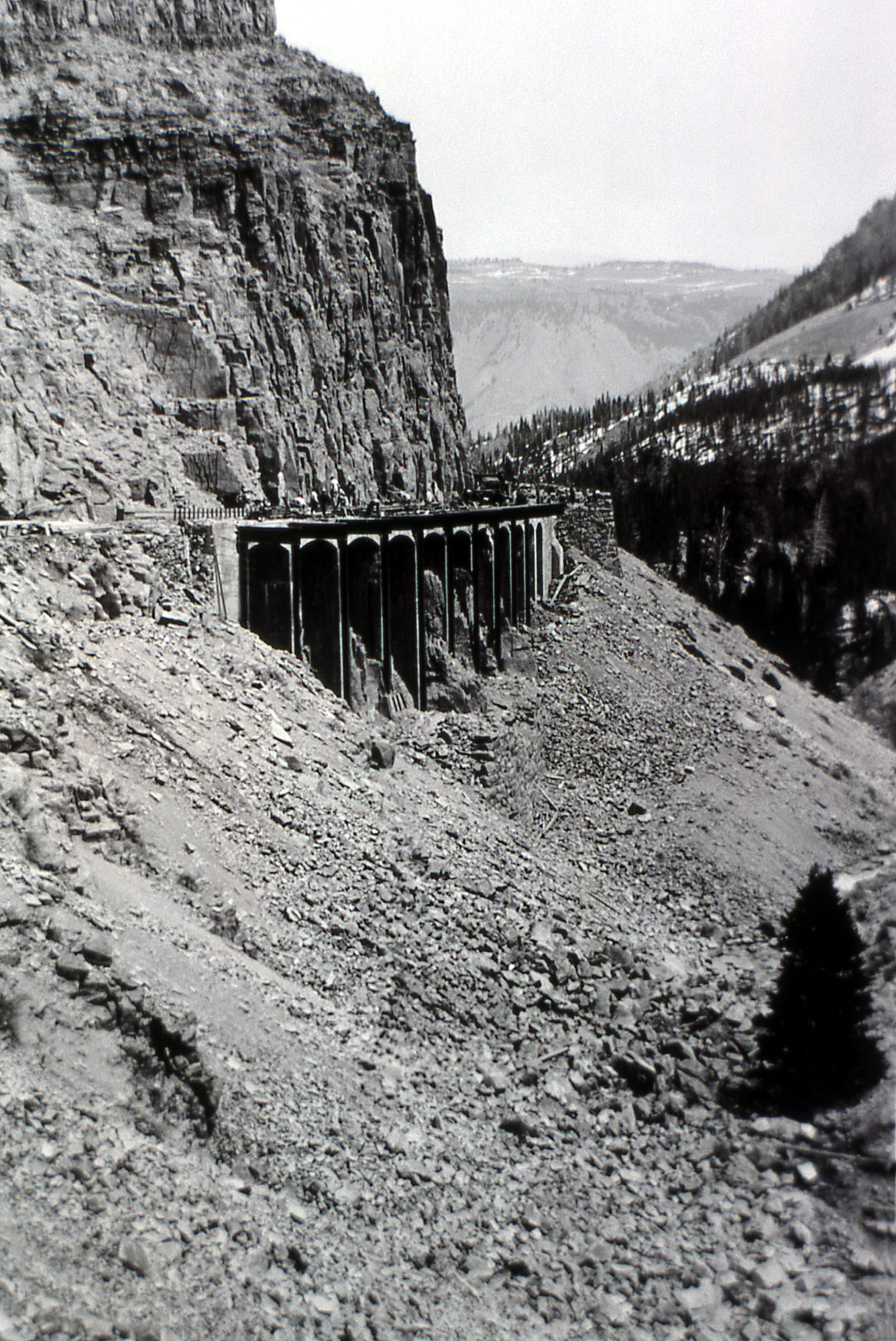
Widening of the Chittenden viaduct, 1933

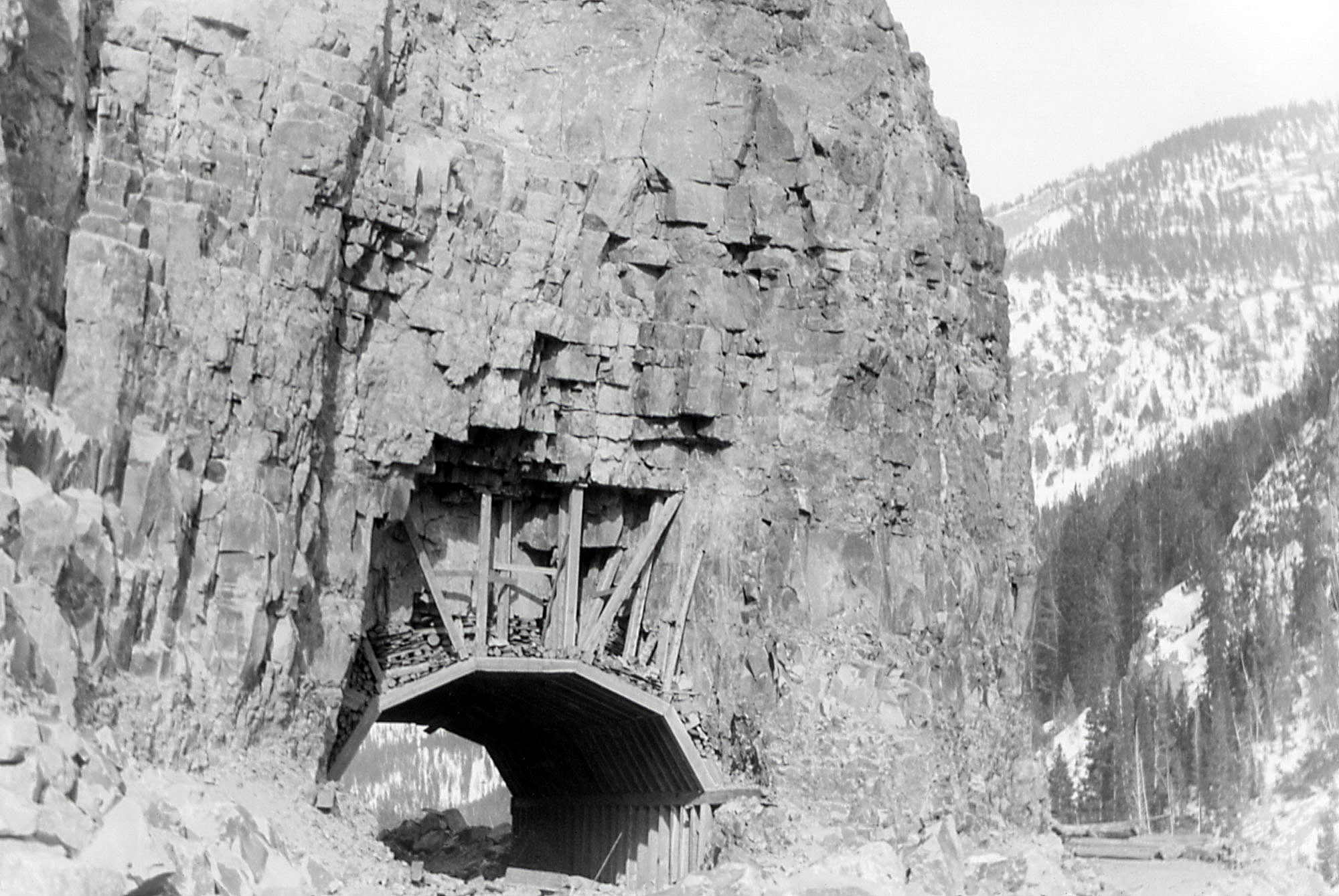
Golden Gate Tunnel, now collapsed and abandoned, in 1933
