= Bunsen Peak =

Mountain in Wyoming, United States

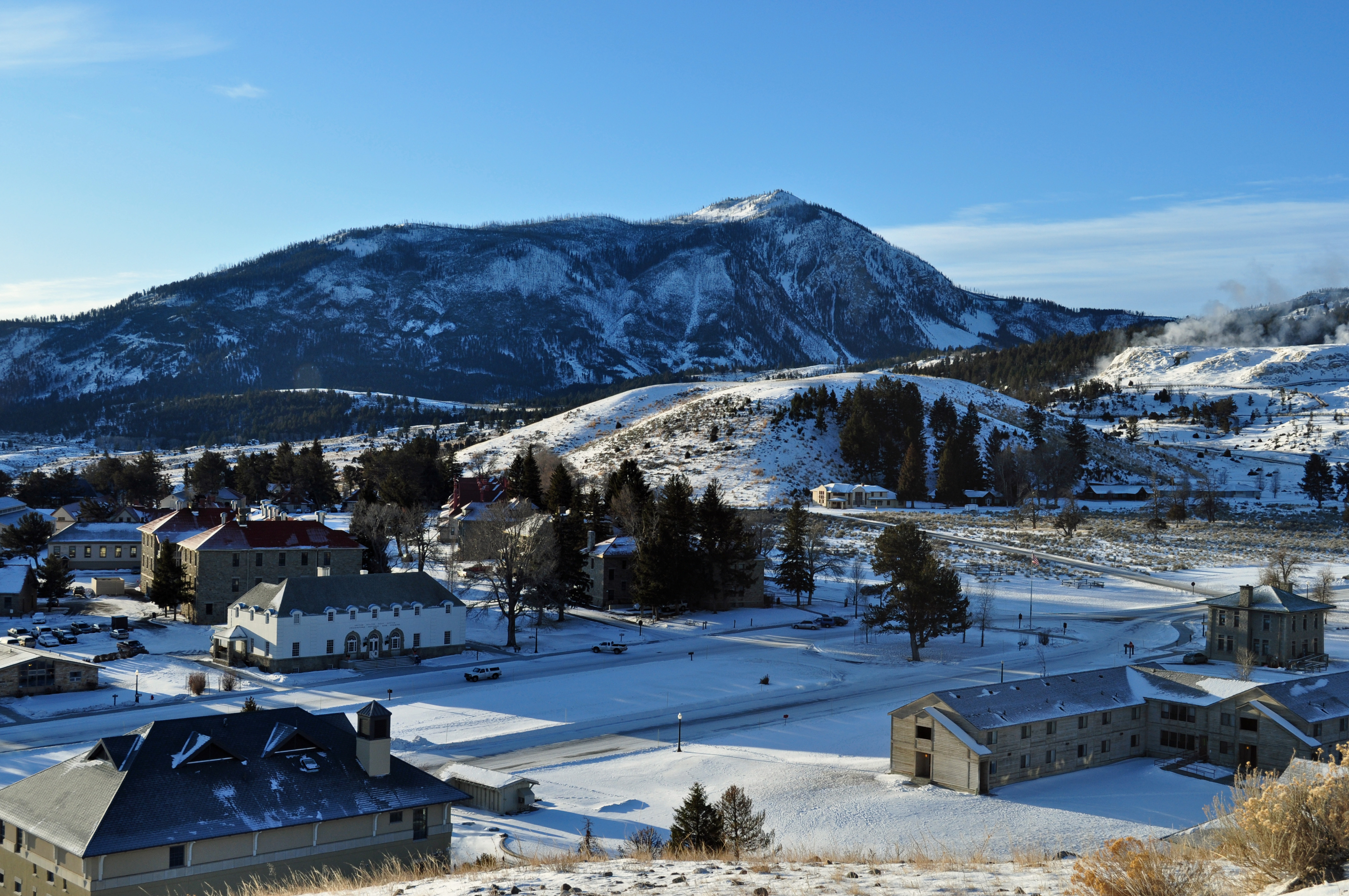
- Bunsen Peak from Mammoth, 2009

Highest point
- Elevation: 8,564 ft (2,610 m)
- Coordinates: 44°55′54″N 110°42′25″W

Geography
- Location within Wyoming
- Location: Yellowstone National Park, Park County, Wyoming, U.S.
- Parent range: Gallatin Range
- Topo map: Mammoth

Geology
- Mountain type: Cinder cone

Bunsen Peak el. 8,564 feet (2,610 m) is a prominent peak due south of Mammoth Hot Springs in Yellowstone National Park, Wyoming. The peak lies on the east flank of Kingman Pass on the Mammoth to Norris section of the Grand Loop Road. The peak was first ascended by Ferdinand V. Hayden and Captain John W. Barlow in 1871, Bunsen Peak was not named until 1872 during the second Hayden Geologic Survey. E. S. Topping named the peak Observation Mountain in 1872 as well, but that name did not stick. The Bunsen Peak Trail with its trailhead just south of Mammoth is a steep 2.1 miles (3.4 km) to the summit. Bunsen Peak was named for the German chemist Robert Bunsen, the inventor of the Bunsen Burner and responsible for early work on volcanic geyser theories.

Images of Bunsen Peak
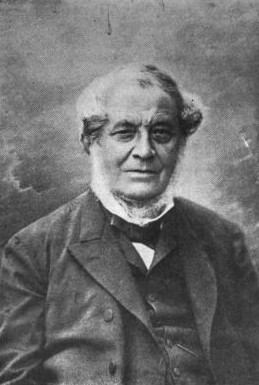
Bunsen Peak namesake, Robert Bunsen

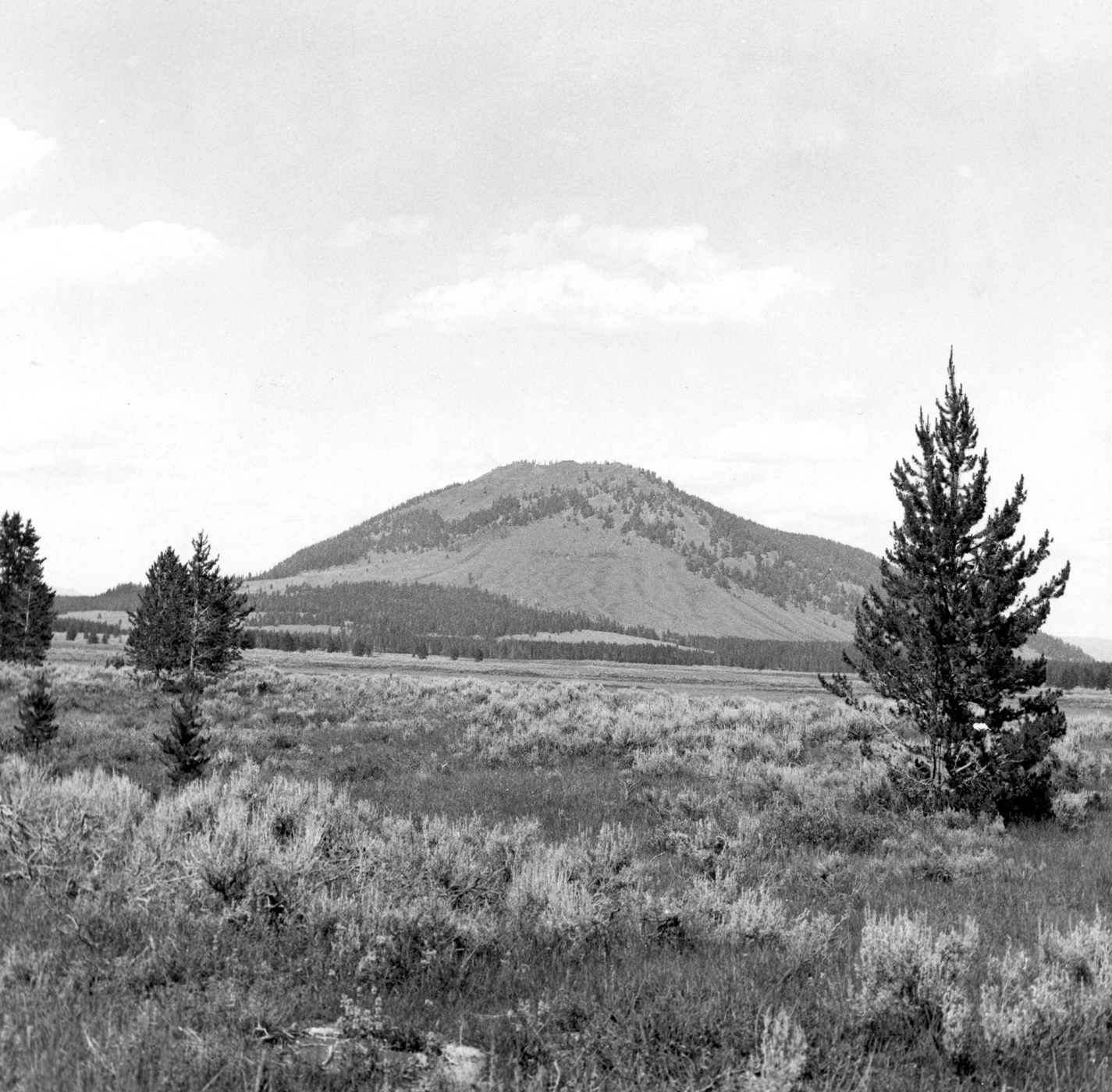
Bunsen Peak from Swan Lake Flats, 1922

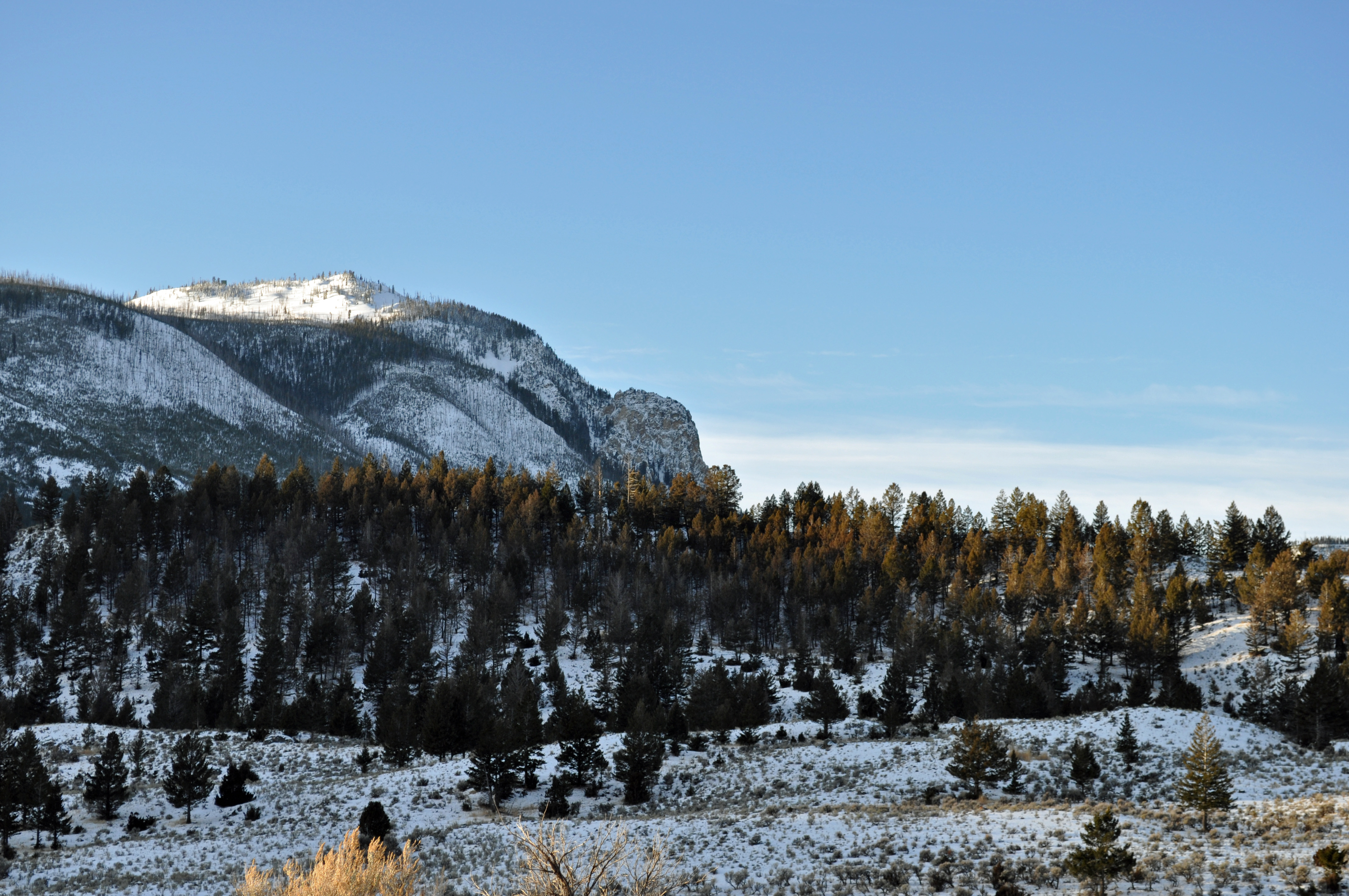
Bunsen Peak from Mammoth Tower Road, 2009

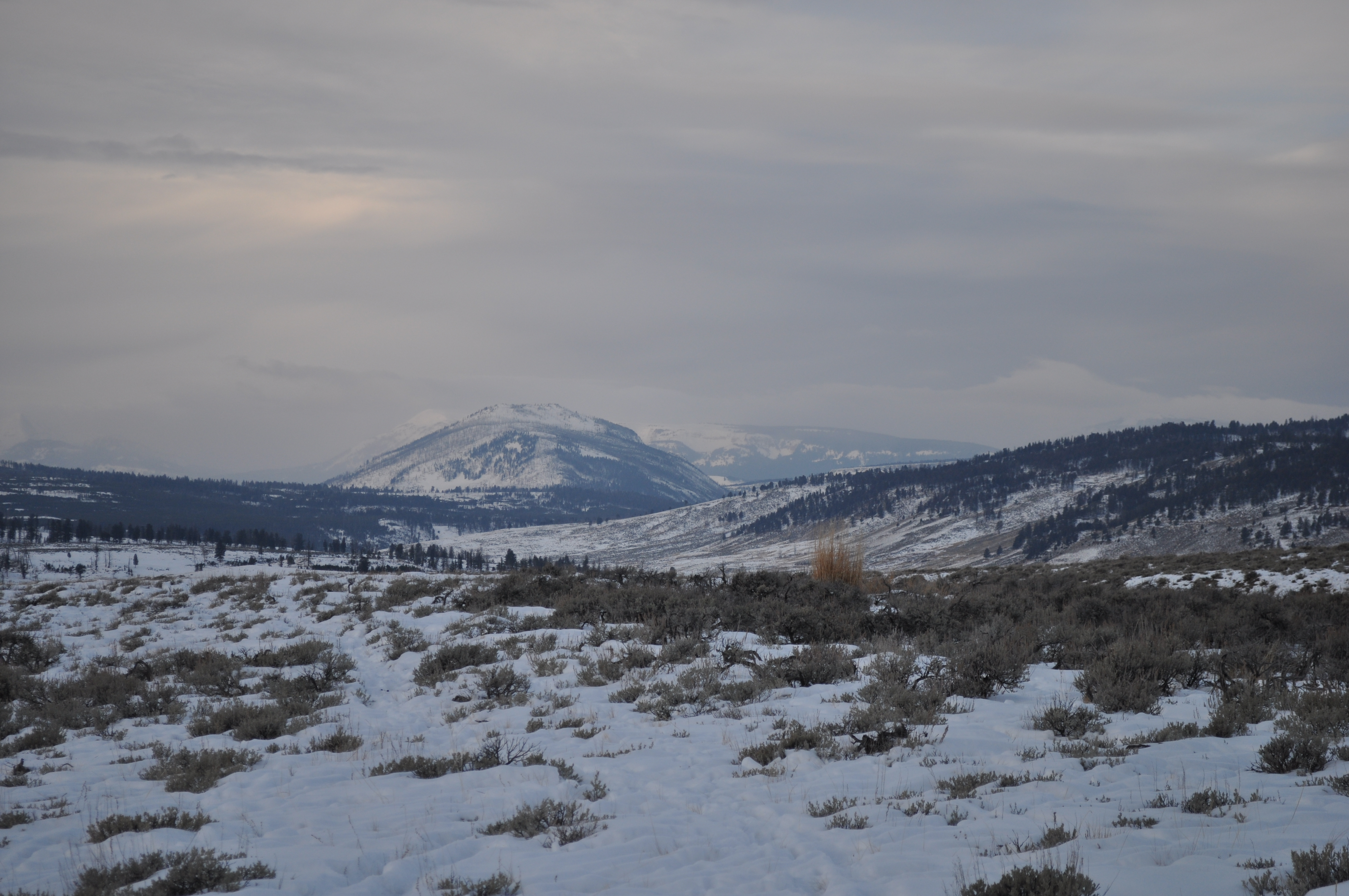
Bunsen Peak from Blacktail Deer Plateau, 2009

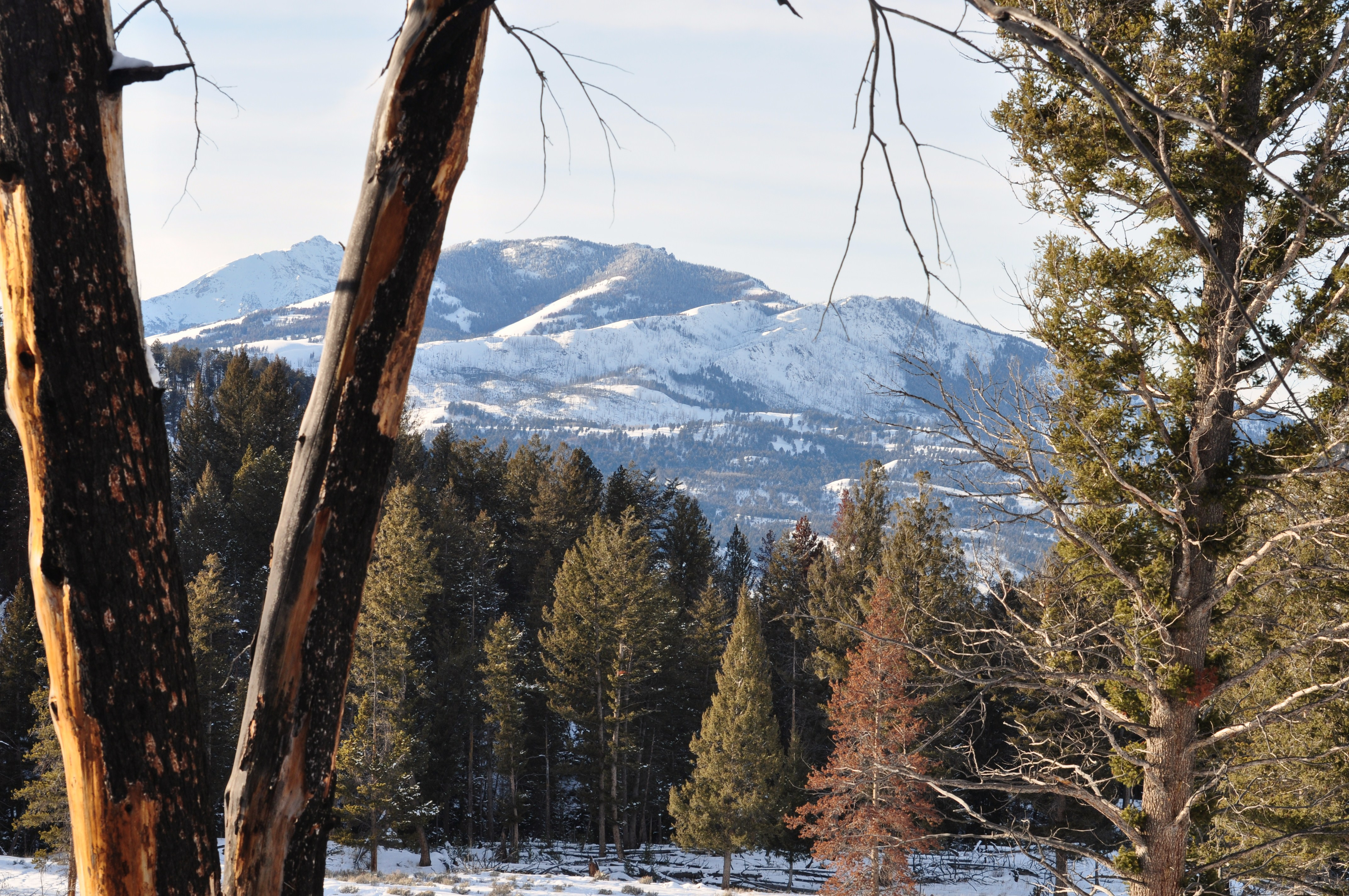
From Wraith Falls trail, 2010

== See also ==
- Mountains and mountain ranges of Yellowstone National Park
