= General Gillespie =

General Gillespie may refer to:

- George Lewis Gillespie Jr. (1841–1913), Union Army major general
- Ken Gillespie (born 1952), Australian Army lieutenant general
- Robert Rollo Gillespie (1766–1814), British Army major general
