= William Bixby =

William Bixby may refer to:

- William Herbert Bixby (1849–1928), U.S. Army general and engineer
- William K. Bixby (1857–1931), American art collector

== See also ==
- Bill Bixby (Wilfred Bailey Everett Bixby III, 1934–1993), American actor
