= Battery Kingman =

Battery Way
- Part of Fort Hancock, New Jersey
- Sandy Hook, New Jersey, United States
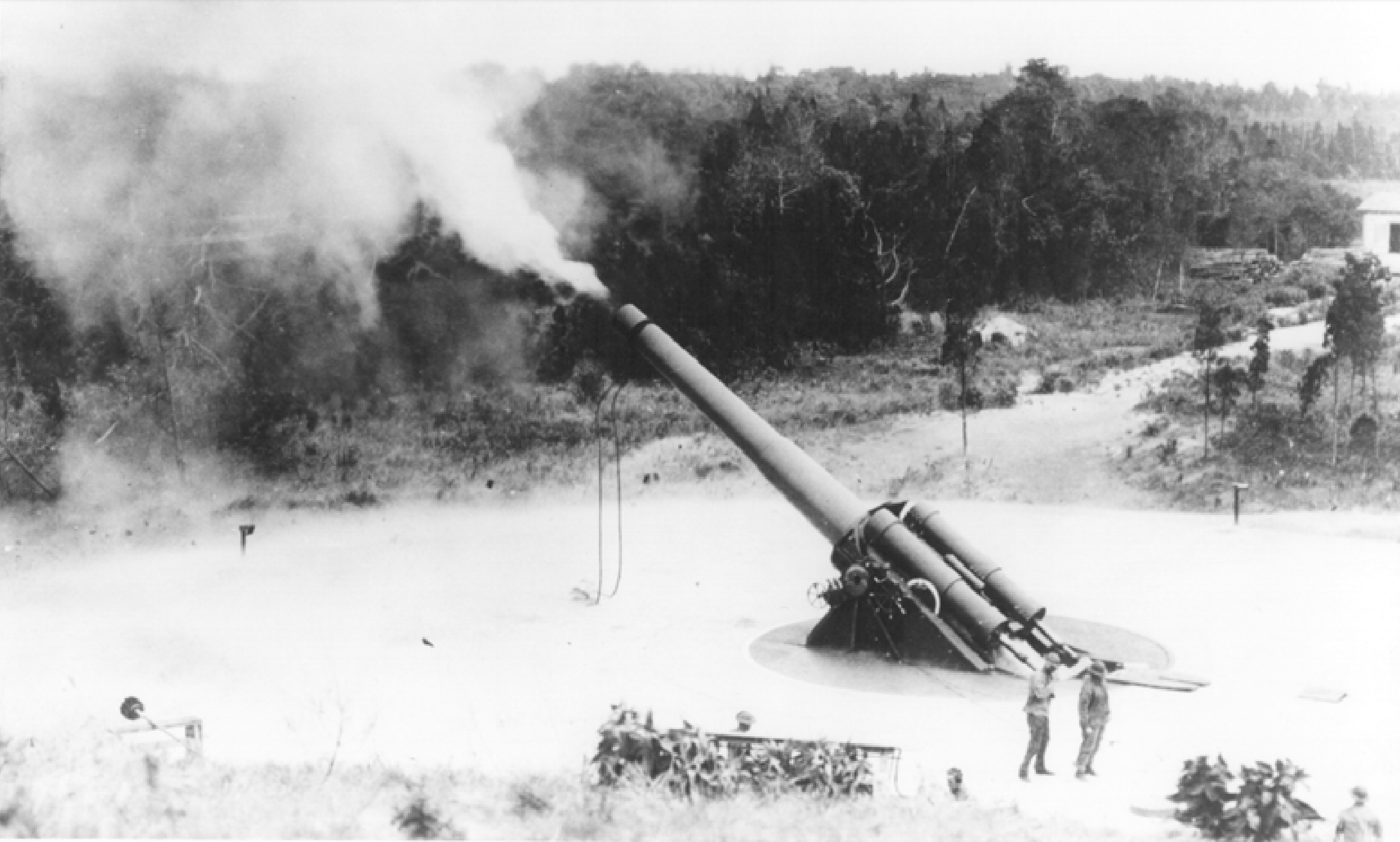
- Battery Kingman firing, 1919

Location
- Coordinates: 40°26′16.8″N 73°59′31.1″W

Site history
- Built: 1917-1921
- Built by: United States Army

Battery Kingman is an artillery emplacement at Fort Hancock, New Jersey. The Battery was named after Dan Christie Kingman (March 6, 1852 – November 14, 1916) an officer in the United States Army who served as Chief of Engineers from 1913 to 1916.

== History ==
=== WWI ===
In the start of the 20th century changing technology meant that battleships out-ranged land based gun batteries. Brigadier General Dan C. Kingman saw this threat and had ordered the United States Army Corps of Engineers to design a new barbette carriage. To out-range battleships, the Model 1917 Barbette carriage, was introduced. He died, in 1916, during the design process so one of the Fort Hancock Batteries was named in his honor. The BCLR M1917 carriage allowed for a maximum elevation of 35 degrees, which added about 9,100 metres (10,000 yd) to its range compared to the normal disappearing carriage.

This new carriage system allowed 12-inch (305 mm) M1895 batteries to fire at a high angle over 32 kilometres (20 mi) in any direction. In 1917 construction began on two 12-inch gun M1895 at Fort Hancock with two guns each on long-range barbette carriages; these were completed in 1921 and named Battery Kingman and Battery Mills.

=== WWII ===
The rise of air power meant static ground defences like Battery Kingman were vulnerable to air attack. Batteries Kingman and Mills were modernized to meet this threat and their guns were protected from aerial bombing by the addition of thick concrete walls and roofs making it a casemate or fortified gun emplacement or armored structure from which guns are fired. In addition, several anti-aircraft gun batteries were installed in Fort Hancock.

== Bibliography ==
Notes

References

- McGovern, Terrance & Bolling Smith (2012). American Coastal Defenses 1885–1950. Bloomsbury Publishing. ISBN 9781849080439. - Total pages: 64
- National Park Service (May 17, 2018). "What's in a name? Fort Hancock's batteries". National Park Service.
- National Park Service (2019). "The Defenses of Sandy Hook" (PDF). United States Department of the Interior. Archived from the original (PDF) on June 8, 2015.
