= Barlow Peak =

Mountain in Wyoming, United States

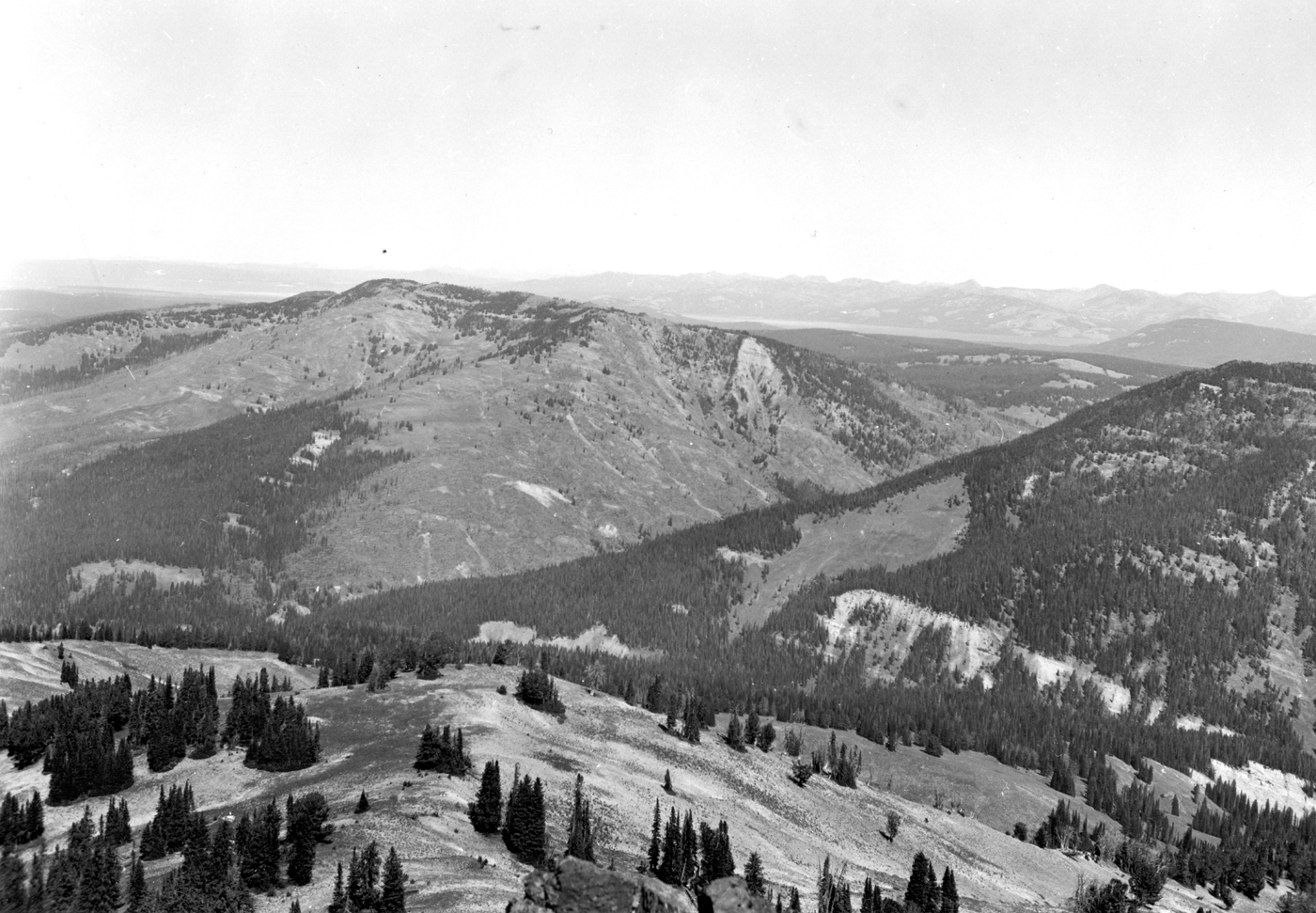
- From Mount Hancock, 1967

Highest point
- Elevation: 9,609 ft (2,929 m)
- Coordinates: 44°10′58″N 110°22′38″W

Geography
- Location: Yellowstone National Park, Teton County, Wyoming
- Parent range: Big Game Ridge
- Topo map: Mount Hancock

Barlow Peak, elevation 9,609 feet (2,929 m), is an isolated mountain peak in the Big Game Ridge section of southwest Yellowstone National Park, south of the Continental Divide, in the U.S. state of Wyoming. Barlow Peak was named by geologist Arnold Hague in 1885 for Captain John W. Barlow, an early topographical engineer who helped to map the park.

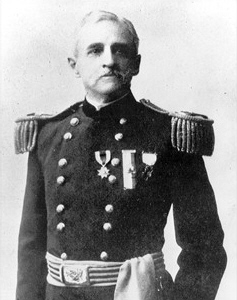
Barlow Peak's namesake, John W. Barlow

== See also ==
- Mountains and mountain ranges of Yellowstone National Park
