= Dan Christie Kingman =

United States Army general (1852–1916)

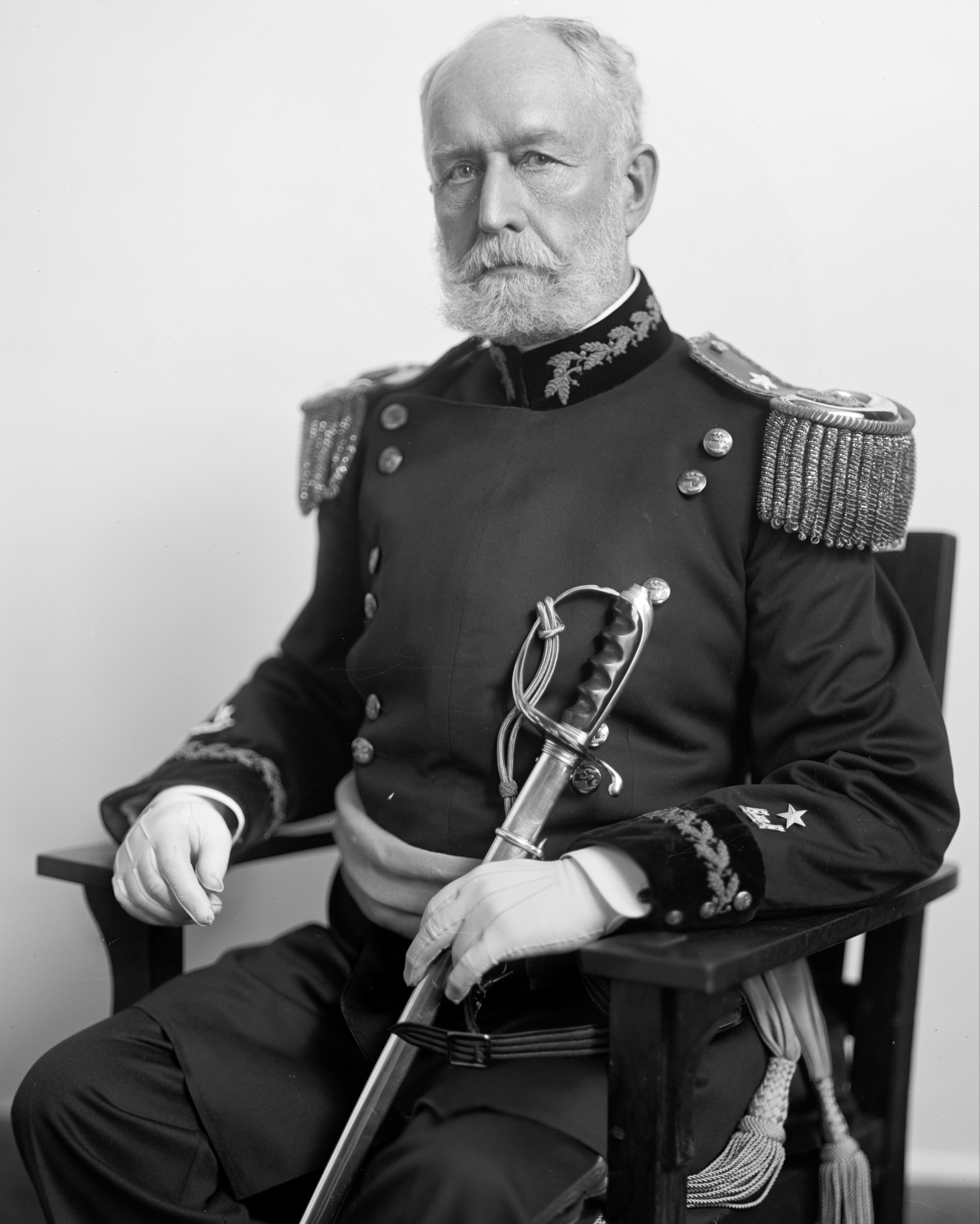
- Kingman between 1905 and 1916
- Born: March 6, 1852; Dover, New Hampshire
- Died: November 14, 1916 (aged 64); Atlantic City, New Jersey
- Burial place: Arlington National Cemetery
- Military career
- Allegiance: United States
- Branch: United States Army
- Service years: 1875–1916
- Rank: Brigadier General
- Commands: Chief of Engineers

Dan Christie Kingman (March 6, 1852 – November 14, 1916) was an officer in the United States Army who served as Chief of Engineers from 1913 to 1916.

== Early life ==
Kingman was born in Dover, New Hampshire on March 6, 1852. His father was John William Kingman (1821–1903), and his mother was Mary Spaulding Christie (1825- 1866). His 7th great-grandparents were Mayflower passengers John Howland and Elizabeth Tilley, and his 5th great-grandfather was Mayflower passenger Resolved White. He was married to Eugenia Jennings (1852- 1930), with whom he had four sons: Dan Christie Kingman Jr. (1879–1918), Colonel Ralph Willcox Kingman (1880–1950), Brigadier General John Jennings Kingman (1882–1948), and Lieutenant Frederick Eustis Kingman (1888–1915).

== Military career ==
Entering the United States Military Academy, Kingman graduated second in the class of 1875 and was commissioned in the Corps of Engineers. He served as an instructor at the Military Academy and as the engineer officer of the Army's Department of the Platte based at Fort Omaha. In 1883, he began the construction of roads and bridges in the new Yellowstone National Park. Kingman Pass on the Grand Loop Road between Mammoth Hot Springs and Norris is named for him.

Kingman directed improvements along the lower Mississippi River in 1886-90 and received the thanks of the Louisiana legislature for "splendid service rendered" during the 1890 flood. He oversaw harbor and fortification work on Lake Ontario in 1891-95 and improvements on the Tennessee River in the last half of that decade. In the latter assignment he initiated planning for federal cost-sharing with private hydroelectric-power investors for a lock and dam built below Chattanooga. Kingman oversaw substantial harbor improvements at Cleveland in 1901-05 and headed the Corps' Savannah District and Southeast Division in 1906–13. The Panama Canal was completed while he was Chief of Engineers. He retired from the army on March 6, 1916.

== Later life ==
Kingman died November 14, 1916, in Atlantic City, New Jersey. He was buried with high military honors in Arlington National Cemetery. Among the pallbearers were Chief of Staff General Hugh L. Scott and two former Chiefs of Engineers, Generals Mackenzie and Bixby.

== See also ==
- Kingman Pass
- North Entrance Road Historic District
- Kingman Island
- Kingman Park
- Kingman Lake
- Battery Kingman

== Notes ==
This article contains public domain text from "Brigadier General Dan Christie Kingman". Portraits and Profiles of Chief Engineers. Archived from the original on March 6, 2005.

Military offices
Preceded by William Trent Rossell	Chief of Engineers; 1913–1916	Succeeded by William Murray Black
