= William Trent Rossell =

United States Army general

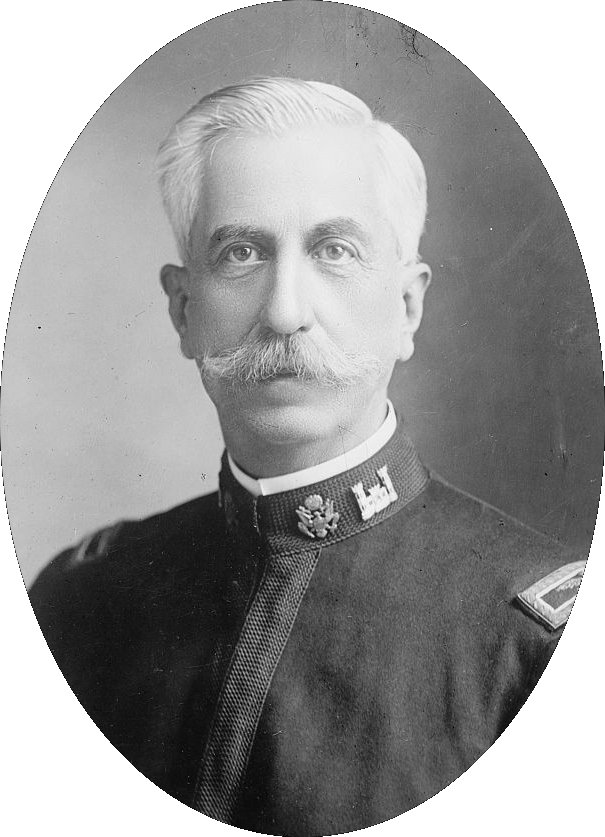
- Brigadier General William T. Rossell, Chief of Engineers 1913
- Born: October 11, 1849; Mount Vernon, Alabama
- Died: October 11, 1919 (aged 70); New Brighton, New York
- Burial place: Congressional Cemetery
- Military career
- Allegiance: United States of America
- Branch: United States Army
- Service years: 1873–1913, 1917–1918
- Rank: Brigadier General
- Commands: Chief of Engineers

Engineer Commissioner of the District of Columbia
- In office October 15, 1891 – May 8, 1893
- Preceded by: Henry Martyn Robert
- Succeeded by: Charles Frances Powell

William Trent Rossell (1849–1919) was the Engineer Commissioner of the District of Columbia.

== Biography ==
He was born in Mount Vernon, Alabama on October 11, 1849, the son and grandson of Army officers, and he graduated third in the United States Military Academy class of 1873. Commissioned in the Corps of Engineers, he served until 1880 at Willets Point and as Assistant Professor of Engineering at the Military Academy. He then engaged in river, harbor, and fortification work in regions around Portland, Maine; Jacksonville, Florida; and Vicksburg, Mississippi. Rossell served in 1891-93 as the Engineer Commissioner on the three-member governing board of the District of Columbia. After briefly commanding the Battalion of Engineers, he led Mobile District for six years. He then supervised lighthouse construction and repair in the New York area and, later, Ohio River improvements. He was a member of the Mississippi River Commission from 1906 to 1913, as well as Central Division Engineer in 1908-09 and Eastern Division Engineer in 1909–13. He retired October 11, 1913, but was recalled to active service in 1917. He led the Third New York and Puerto Rico districts and was Northeast Division Engineer. He again retired in 1918. He died October 11, 1919, in New Brighton, New York.

Military offices
Preceded by William Herbert Bixby	Chief of Engineers; 1913	Succeeded by Dan Christie Kingman
