= George Lewis Gillespie Jr. =

United States Army general (1841–1913)

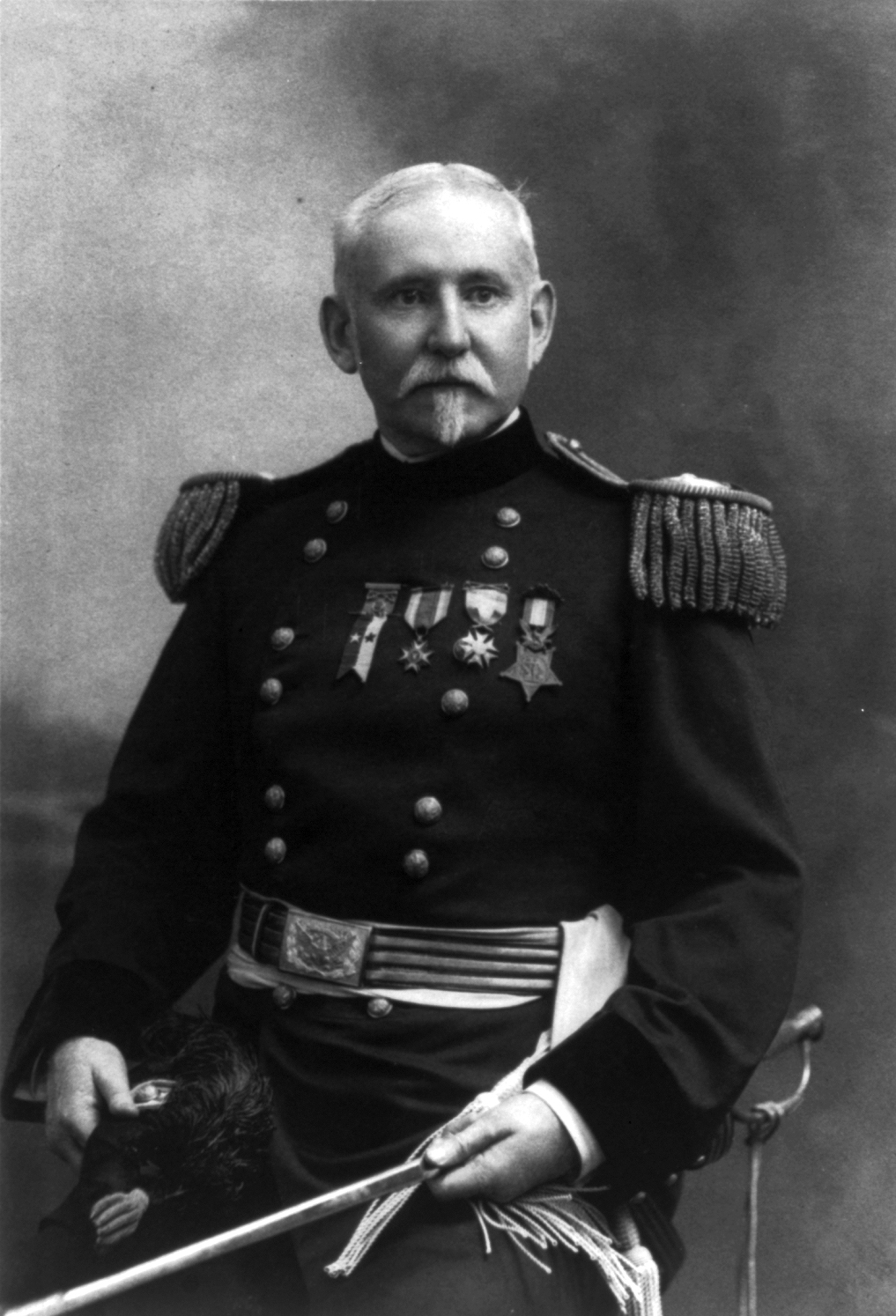
- Gillespie in 1898
- Born: October 7, 1841; Kingston, Tennessee, US
- Died: September 27, 1913 (aged 71); Saratoga Springs, New York, US
- Burial place: West Point Cemetery
- Military career
- Allegiance: United States
- Branch: United States Army (Union Army)
- Service years: 1862–1905
- Rank: Major general
- Unit: U.S. Army Corps of Engineers
- Commands: Department of the East; Chief of Engineers
- Conflicts: American Civil War
- Awards: Medal of Honor

George Lewis Gillespie Jr. (October 7, 1841 – September 27, 1913) was an American soldier who received the United States' highest military decoration, the Medal of Honor, for his actions during the American Civil War.

== Biography ==
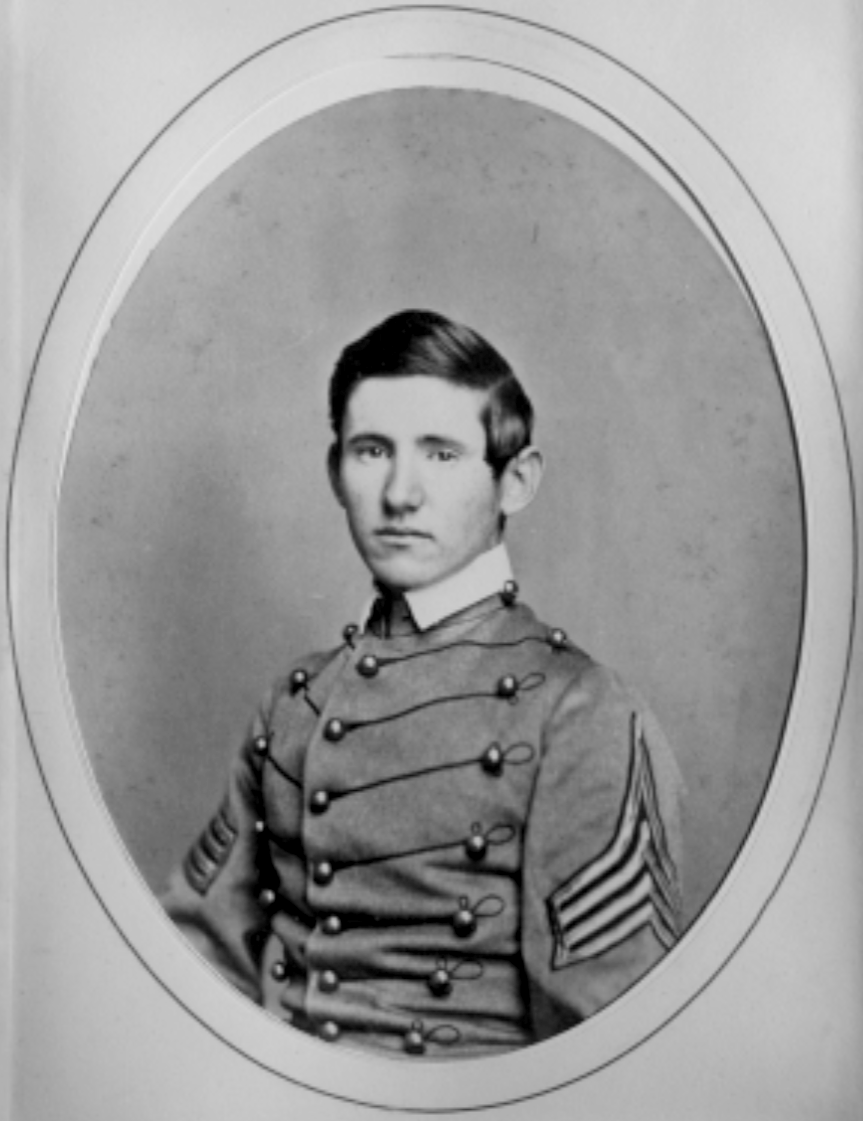
At West Point in 1862

George Lewis Gillespie Jr. was born October 7, 1841, in Kingston, Tennessee. He graduated second in the Class of 1862 at the United States Military Academy and was commissioned a 2nd lieutenant in the Corps of Engineers on June 17, 1862.

A Southerner who remained loyal to the Union, Gillespie joined the Army of the Potomac in September 1862. He commanded two companies of the engineer battalion which built fortifications and pontoon bridges throughout the Virginia campaigns until General Robert E. Lee's surrender at Appomattox in April 1865.

On October 27, 1897, Gillespie received the Medal of Honor for carrying dispatches through enemy lines under withering fire to Major General Philip Sheridan at the Battle of Cold Harbor, Virginia, on May 31, 1864. He was later Sheridan's chief engineer in the Army of the Shenandoah and the Military Division of the Gulf.

At the end of the war, Gillespie held the Regular Army rank of captain and a brevet (temporary promotion) to the rank of lieutenant colonel.

After the Civil War, Gillespie successively supervised the improvement of harbors at Cleveland, Ohio, Chicago, Boston, and New York City. He initiated construction of the canal at the Cascades of the Columbia River and built the famous Tillamook Rock Lighthouse off the Oregon coast. Gillespie also served on the Board of Engineers and for six years as president of the Mississippi River Commission.

He was promoted to major on September 5, 1871, lieutenant colonel on October 12, 1886, and colonel on October 2, 1895.

With the outbreak of the Spanish–American War, Gillespie was promoted to brigadier general of Volunteers on May 27, 1898. He commanded the Army's Department of the East until October 31, 1898, when he was discharged from the Volunteers and reverted to his Regular Army rank of colonel.

Gillespie was appointed as Chief of Engineers on May 3, 1901, and promoted to brigadier general the same day. He was acting U.S. Secretary of War in August 1901. He had charge of ceremonies at President William McKinley's funeral and at the laying of the cornerstone of the Army War College building in 1903.

About 1904, he redesigned the United States Army's version of the Medal of Honor. The new design replaced the original design dating from 1862 which was often erroneously mistaken for the membership badge of the Grand Army of the Republic—an organization for Union veterans of the American Civil War. General Gillespie's design entirely changed the planchet to feature the head of Minerva in the center of a star surrounded by a wreath. The ribbon was changed from red, white and blue stripes to a light blue ribbon with thirteen white stars.

Gillespie's final assignment was as Assistant Chief of Staff of the United States Army from 1904 to 1905 with the rank of major general.

Gillespie was a companion of the District of Columbia Commandery of the Military Order of the Loyal Legion of the United States (MOLLUS) and was assigned MOLLUS insignia number 4061. He was also a member of the Society of the Army of the Potomac.

Major General Gillespie retired from the Army on June 15, 1905, having reached the mandatory retirement age of 64. He died on September 27, 1913, in Saratoga Springs, New York. He was buried at West Point Cemetery.

== Family ==
General Gillespie married Rhobie Frances McMaster (1844–1921). By her he had two sons - Robert McMaster Gillespie (1871–1947) and Laurence Lewis Gillespie (1876–1940).

== Medal of Honor citation ==
Rank and organization: First Lieutenant, Corps of Engineers, U.S. Army. Place and date: Near Bethesda Church, Va., 31 May 1864. Entered service at: Chattanooga, Tenn. Birth: Kingston, Tenn. Date of issue: 27 October 1897.

Citation:

Exposed himself to great danger by voluntarily making his way through the enemy's lines to communicate with Gen. Sheridan. While rendering this service he was captured, but escaped; again came in contact with the enemy, was again ordered to surrender, but escaped by dashing away under fire.

== See also ==
- List of American Civil War Medal of Honor recipients: G–L
- List of United States Military Academy alumni (Medal of Honor)
- List of major generals in the United States Regular Army before July 1, 1920
- List of United States Military Academy alumni (engineers)
- List of United States Military Academy alumni (Union Army)

Military offices
Preceded by John W. Barlow	Chief of Engineers; 1901–1904	Succeeded by Alexander Mackenzie
