= William Louis Marshall =

United States Army general (1846–1920)

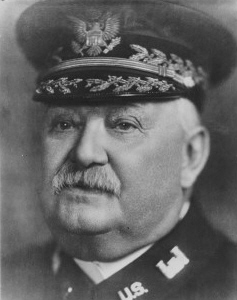
- William Louis Marshall, Chief of Engineers 1908–1910
- Born: June 11, 1846; Washington, Kentucky
- Died: July 2, 1920 (aged 74); Washington, D.C.
- Burial place: Arlington National Cemetery
- Military career
- Allegiance: United States of America
- Branch: United States Army
- Service years: 1862–1863,1868–1910
- Rank: Brigadier general
- Commands: Chief of Engineers
- Conflicts: American Civil War

William Louis Marshall (June 11, 1846, in Washington, Kentucky – July 2, 1920) was an influential figure in the US Corps of Engineers.

At age 16 Marshall enlisted in the 10th Kentucky Cavalry, Union Army. He graduated from the United States Military Academy in 1868 and was commissioned in the Corps of Engineers. Accompanying Lieutenant George Wheeler's Wheeler Survey expedition (1872–76), Marshall covered thousands of miles on foot and horseback and discovered Marshall Pass in central Colorado. He oversaw improvements on the Lower Mississippi River near Vicksburg and on the Fox–Wisconsin Waterway canal system in Wisconsin. As Chicago District Engineer from 1888 to 1899, he planned and began to build the Illinois and Mississippi Canal. Marshall made innovative use of concrete masonry and developed original and cost-saving methods of canal lock construction. Stationed at New York (1900–08), he directed the Ambrose Channel project and the standardizing of fortification construction methods. He retired June 11, 1910—the final Chief of Engineers to have served in the Civil War—but his engineering reputation earned a special appointment from President William Howard Taft as consulting engineer to the Secretary of the Interior on hydroelectric power projects. General Marshall died July 2, 1920, in Washington, D.C.

Military offices
| Preceded by Alexander Mackenzie | Chief of Engineers; 1908–1910 | Succeeded by William Herbert Bixby |
