= Kingman Pass =

- Kingman Pass, 2012
- Interactive map of Kingman Pass
- Elevation: 7,119 ft (2,170 m)
- Traversed by: U.S. Route 89

Third Approach
- Location: Park County, Wyoming, United States
- Coordinates: 44°56′06″N 110°43′24″W

Kingman Pass el. 7,119 feet (2,170 m) is a mountain pass between Terrance Mountain and Bunsen Peak on the Grand Loop Road (U.S. Route 89), just south of Mammoth Hot Springs in Yellowstone National Park. The pass is named for Lieutenant Dan Christie Kingman of the U.S. Army Corps of Engineers. Kingman rebuilt this difficult portion of the Grand Loop Road in the area known as The Golden Gate in 1883.

Images of Kingman Pass and Trestle
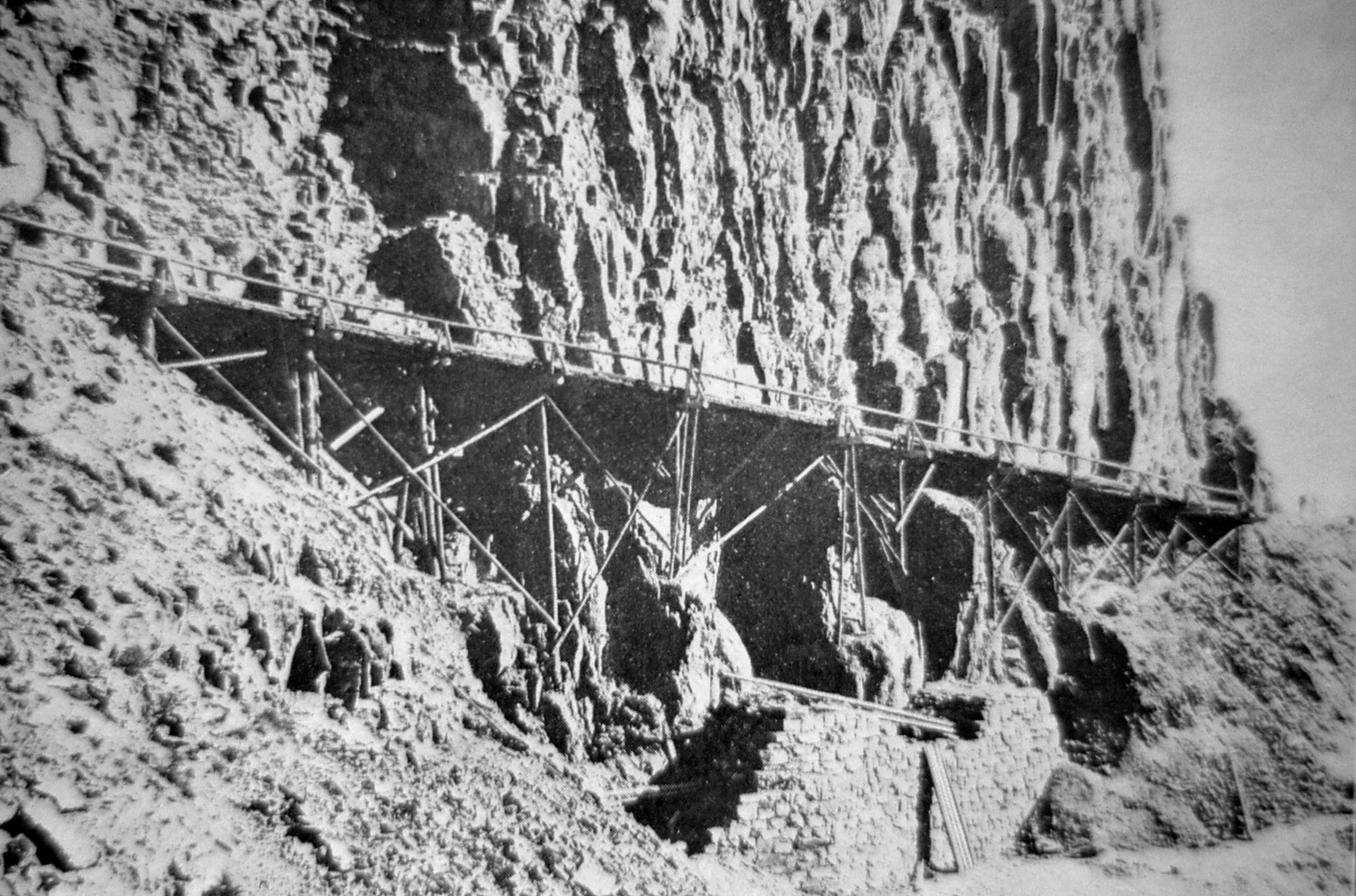
Original Kingman Trestle, 1885

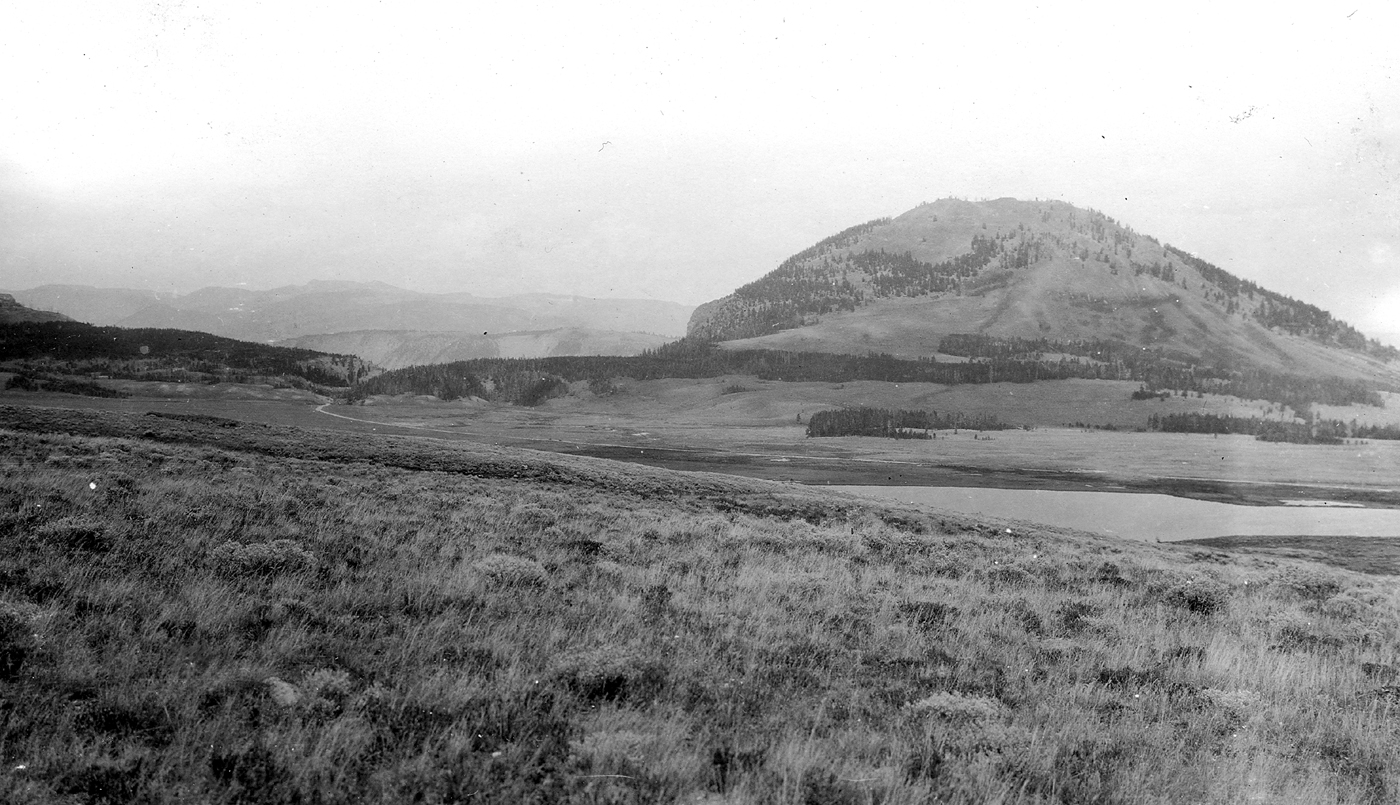
Kingman Pass from Swan Lake, 1922

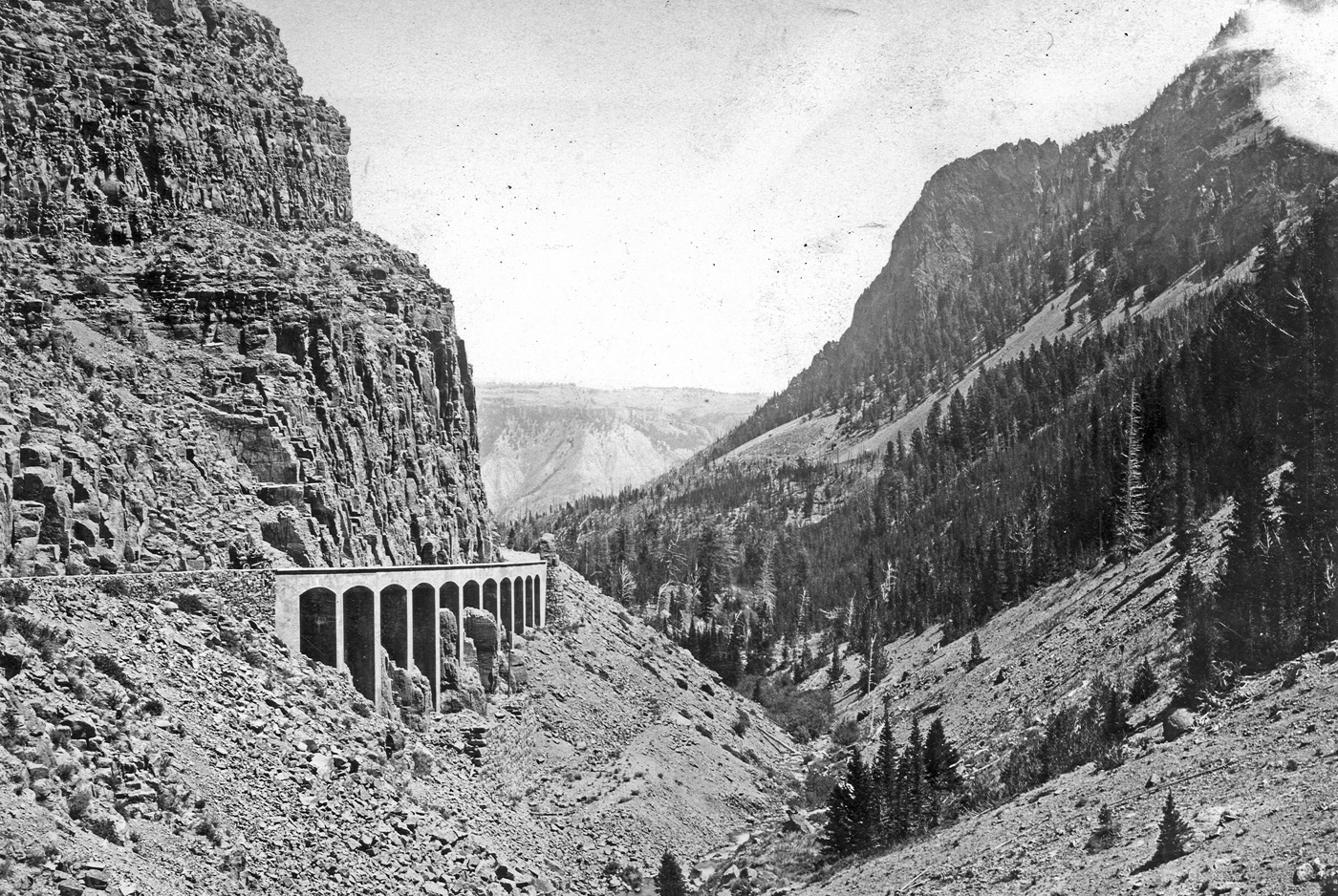
Kingman Pass, 1921
