= John W. Barlow =

United States Army Civil War general

John Whitney Barlow
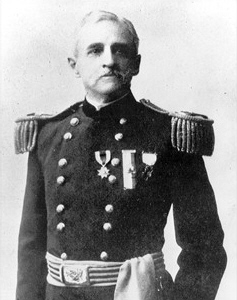
- Brigadier General John W. Barlow, Chief of Engineers May 2–May 3, 1901
- Born: June 26, 1838; Perry, New York, U.S.
- Died: February 27, 1914 (aged 75); Jerusalem
- Burial place: Arlington National Cemetery
- Military career
- Allegiance: United States of America; Union
- Branch: United States Army; Union Army
- Service years: 1861–1901
- Rank: Brigadier General
- Commands: Chief of Engineers
- Conflicts: American Civil War: Battle of Gettysburg; Atlanta campaign; Indian Wars

John Whitney Barlow (June 26, 1838 – February 27, 1914) was a career officer in the United States Army. During and after the American Civil War, he was noted for his engineering talents.

== Biography ==
Barlow was born at Perry, Wyoming County, New York to Nehemiah and Orinda Barlow, who later moved their family to Wisconsin. He was appointed to the United States Military Academy and graduated in May 1861. Barlow was first commissioned into the artillery and served with the famed U.S. Horse Artillery Brigade during the Peninsula Campaign, but transferred to the Topographical Engineers in July 1862. He served with the Battalion of Engineers at Gettysburg and as engineer of an army corps in the siege of Atlanta. He supervised the defenses of Nashville and was brevetted as a lieutenant colonel for his gallant service there in December 1864.

Between Civil War campaigns, Barlow was detailed to the Military Academy as an assistant professor. He taught mathematics from September 1862 to March 1863, geography, history and ethics from March to June 1863 and mathematics again from February to June 1864.

From 1870 until 1874 he was General Sheridan's Chief Engineer in the Military Division of the Missouri. During this period he made scientific explorations of the headwaters of the Missouri and Yellowstone rivers. In 1872, his expedition party was attacked by about 1000 warriors led by Sitting Bull, but they were defeated by the 400 cavalry troopers assigned to guard the explorers. His detailed reports became guides for settlers. Barlow improved the harbors and defenses of Long Island Sound from 1875 to 1883, executed harbor improvements in northern Wisconsin and Michigan, and worked on the construction of a canal around Muscle Shoals on the Tennessee River.

He was the senior American member of the international commission that re-marked the disputed boundary with Mexico in 1892–96. He was subsequently Northwest Division Engineer for four years. On May 2, 1901, he was commissioned as a brigadier general and appointed Chief of Engineers. The next day, May 3, 1901, he retired from the Army after 40 years of service.

== Personal ==
Barlow married Hessie McNaughten Birnie (December 15, 1843 – December 8, 1898) on December 26, 1861, in Washington, D.C. They had two daughters and a son. While he was serving as Northwest Division Engineer based in New York City, his wife died of bronchial pneumonia at their residence in The Albany, Broadway and 51st Street, Manhattan.

After retirement, he moved to New London, Connecticut where he married Alice Stanton Turner (1849 – 1936) on September 17, 1902.

Barlow died on February 27, 1914, in Jerusalem, Palestine, at the age of 75. He had been on a package tour of the Holy Land with his second wife. His body was shipped back to the United States and was interred at Arlington National Cemetery beside his first wife.

== Legacy ==
Battery Barlow–Saxton at Fort MacArthur was named in his honor.

Barlow Peak in Yellowstone National Park is named for John W. Barlow.

== See also ==
Military offices
Preceded by Henry Martyn Robert	Chief of Engineers; 1901	Succeeded by George Lewis Gillespie, Jr.
