= Alexander Mackenzie (engineer) =

American Chief of Engineers (1844–1921)

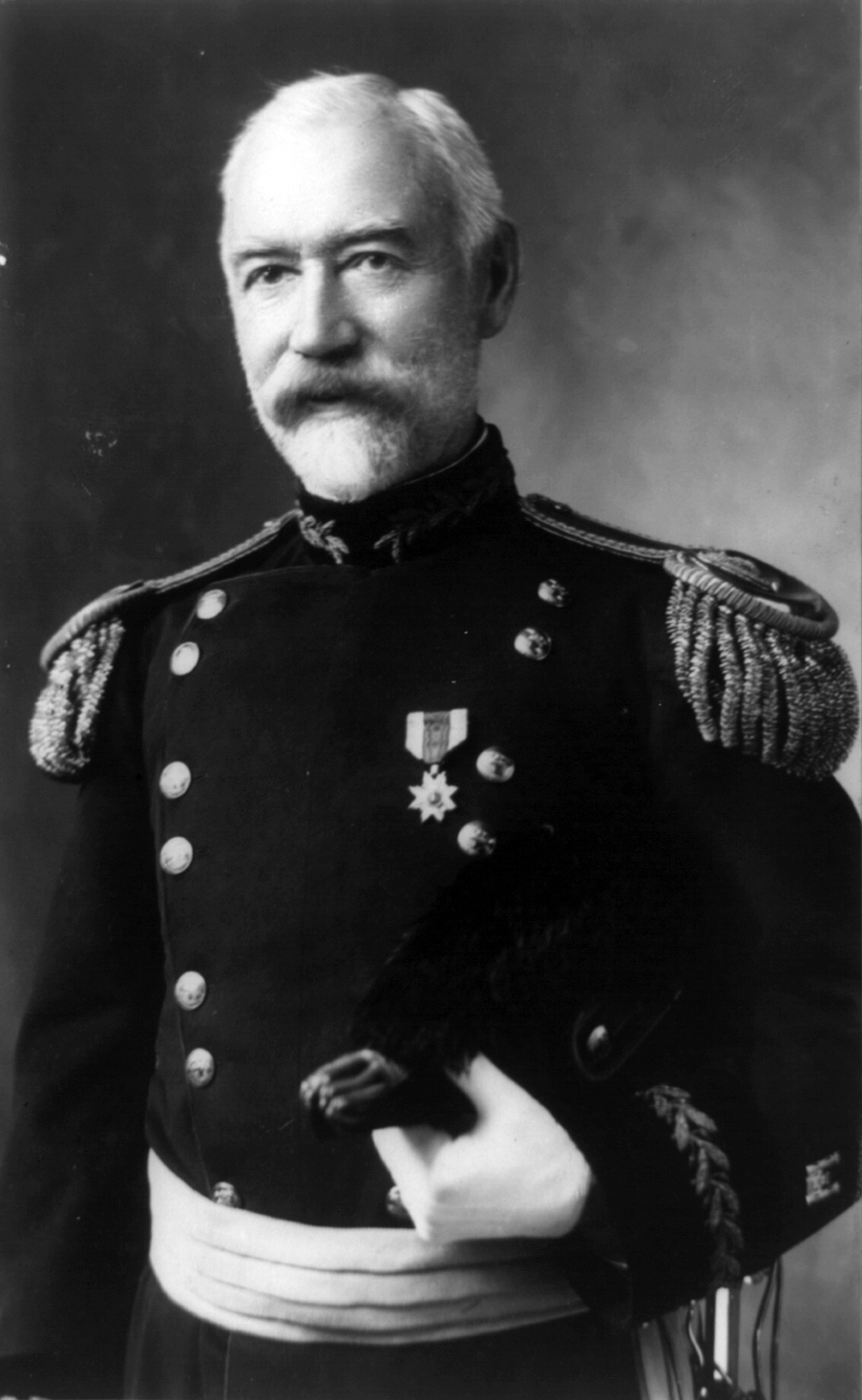
- Brigadier General Alexander Mackenzie
- Born: May 25, 1844; Potosi, Territory of Wisconsin
- Died: February 23, 1921 (aged 76); Washington, D.C.
- Military career
- Allegiance: United States of America
- Branch: United States Army
- Service years: 1864–1908, 1917
- Rank: Major General
- Commands: Chief of Engineers
- Conflicts: American Civil War

Alexander Mackenzie (May 25, 1844 – February 23, 1921) was an American engineer.

Mackenzie was born May 25, 1844, in Potosi, Wisconsin and graduated from the United States Military Academy in 1864. Commissioned in the United States Army Corps of Engineers, he served with the Union Army in Arkansas in 1864–65. Mackenzie spent six years commanding a company of engineer troops at Willets Point, New York, that experimented in the use of torpedoes (a.k.a. mines) in coastal defense. In 1879 he began a 16-year stint as Rock Island District Engineer. He built 100 miles of wing dams on the upper Mississippi River and produced a 40-foot channel between St. Paul and the mouth of the Missouri River. Called to Washington in 1895, he became Assistant to the Chief of Engineers in charge of all matters relating to river and harbor improvements. He was the first senior member of the Board of Engineers for Rivers and Harbors, which reviewed improvements submitted by Corps of Engineer officers. He was a member of the general staff corps and War College Board when appointed Chief of Engineers on January 23, 1904. In that capacity Mackenzie reported on the federal statutes relating to water power for the Inland Waterways Commission, which was established by President Theodore Roosevelt in 1907 and presented in its preliminary report transmitted to Congress on February 26, 1908.

Mackenzie retired May 25, 1908, as a major general, he was recalled to active duty in 1917 at age 73 as Northwest Division Engineer serving again in Rock Island, Illinois.

General Mackenzie died of a stroke on February 23, 1921, at a bank in Washington, D.C. He was buried in Milwaukee.

== See also ==
- Fort Sherman

Military offices
Preceded by George Lewis Gillespie Jr.	Chief of Engineers; 1904–1908	Succeeded by William Louis Marshall
