= William Herbert Bixby =

United States Army general

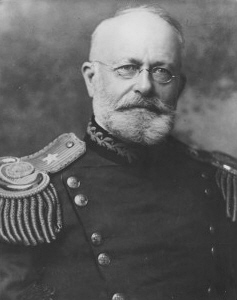
- Brigadier General William Herbert Bixby, Chief of Engineers 1910–1913
- Born: December 27, 1849; Charlestown, Massachusetts
- Died: September 29, 1928 (aged 78); Washington, D.C.
- Burial place: Arlington National Cemetery
- Military career
- Allegiance: United States of America
- Branch: United States Army
- Service years: 1873–1913
- Rank: Brigadier General
- Commands: Chief of Engineers

William Herbert Bixby (December 27, 1849 – September 29, 1928) was a brigadier general in the U.S. Army. He graduated first in the United States Military Academy class of 1873 and was commissioned in the Corps of Engineers.

== Early life ==
Bixby was born in 1849 in Charleston, Massachusetts. His parents were Elizabeth Clark and Clark Smith Bixby. He attended schools in Cambridge and Brookline, Massachusetts. He went to MIT from 1867 to 1868. He attended the United States Military Academy at Westpoint, class of 1873 and was commissioned in the Corps of Engineers.

== Career ==
After serving with the engineer battalion at Willets Point and as assistant professor of engineering at the Military Academy, Bixby graduated with honors from the French Ecole des ponts et chaussées from 1879 to 1881. He received the Order, Legion of Honor, for assisting French Army maneuvers. Bixby headed the Wilmington, North Carolina District from 1884 to 1891.

He oversaw improvements on the Cape Fear River, modernized the area's coastal forts, and responded to the earthquake that hit Charleston, South Carolina, in 1886. Bixby served next as District Engineer in Newport, Rhode Island. From 1897 to 1902 he oversaw improvements on the Ohio River and its tributaries from Pittsburgh to Cincinnati.

After two years in charge of the Detroit District, he became Chicago District Engineer and Northwest Division Engineer. Bixby was president of the Mississippi River Commission in 1908-10 and 1917–18. As Chief of Engineers, he oversaw the raising of the battleship USS Maine. He retired August 11, 1913, but was recalled to service in 1917 as Western Division Engineer.

== Personal life ==
He married Lidy Hamilton Rogers of Philadelphia on December 27, 1893. They lived in Washington, D.C. He was a member of the Army and Navy Club, the Cosmos Club, and the University Club of New York. He died September 29, 1928, in Washington, D.C., aged 78.

Military offices
Preceded by William Louis Marshall	Chief of Engineers; 1910–1913	Succeeded by William Trent Rossell
