= John T. Thompson =

United States Army general (1860–1940)

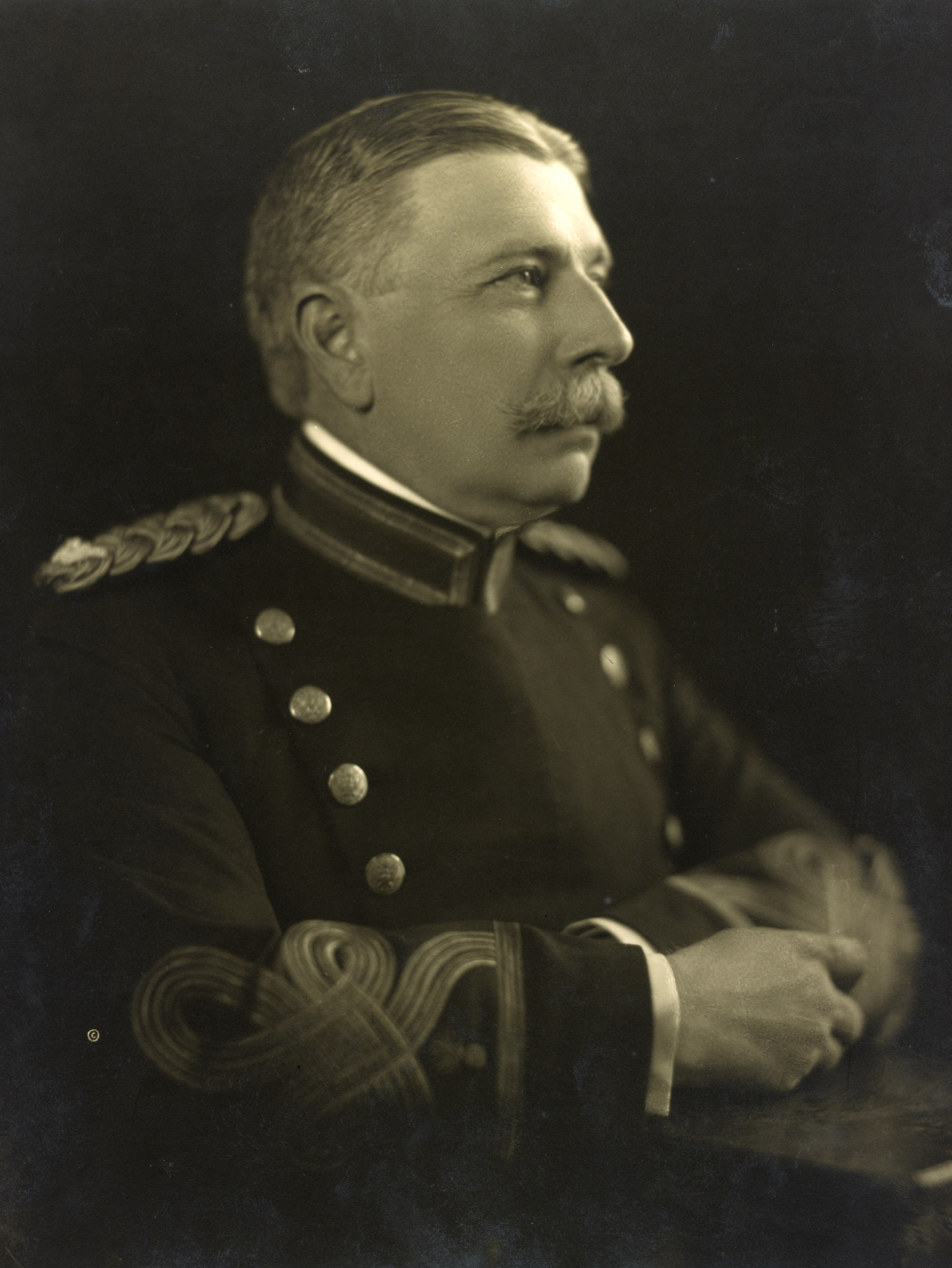
- Thompson in 1915
- Born: John Taliaferro Thompson; December 31, 1860; Newport, Kentucky, U.S.
- Died: June 21, 1940 (aged 79); Great Neck, New York, U.S.
- Burial place: West Point Cemetery
- Military career
- Allegiance: United States
- Branch: United States Army
- Service years: 1882–1914, 1917–1918
- Rank: Brigadier General
- Known for: Founded and named the Thompson submachine gun.
- Awards: Distinguished Service Medal
- Other work: Auto-Ordnance Corporation founder

John Taliaferro (Note: Italian pronunciation: [taljaˈfɛrro]; anglicized to "Tolliver") Thompson (December 31, 1860 – June 21, 1940) was a United States Army officer known for being the inventor of the Thompson submachine gun, widely known as the "Tommy gun."

== Early life ==
Born on December 31, 1860, in Newport, Kentucky, Thompson grew up on a succession of Army posts and had decided on the military as a career by the age of sixteen. His father was Lieutenant Colonel James Thompson, his mother was Maria Taliaferro. He attended Indiana University Bloomington and was a member of the Beta Theta Pi fraternity. After a year of class, in 1877, he gained an appointment to the United States Military Academy (USMA) at West Point, New York, from where he graduated in June 1882. Among his classmates there at the academy were several men who would, like Thompson himself (who graduated 11th in a class of 37), eventually attain the rank of brigadier general or higher during their military careers, such as Edward Burr, Lansing H. Beach, Adelbert Cronkhite, Charles Treat, Edward A. Millar, Richard W. Young, Benjamin Alvord Jr., George W. McIver, Henry T. Allen, William H. Sage, Thomas B. Dugan, and William H. Allaire.

His first duty station was at Newport Barracks (near in his birthplace of Newport, Kentucky), where he was assigned to the 2nd Artillery as a second lieutenant. He then attended engineering and artillery schools and was finally assigned to the Army's Ordnance Department in 1890, where he spent the rest of his military career. During this period he began his specialization in small arms.

== Spanish–American War ==
With the beginning of the Spanish–American War, Thompson was promoted to lieutenant colonel and sent to Tampa, Florida as Chief Ordnance Officer for the commander of the Cuban campaign, General William R. Shafter. While the rest of the Army was plagued with logistical problems, Thompson managed ordnance supply operations to Cuba efficiently. More than 18,000 tons of munitions were transferred to the battlefield from his Tampa command without any accidents. Thompson was promoted to colonel, the youngest such in the Army at the time.

It was also this war that offered Thompson his first exposure to automatic weapons. At the request of Lieutenant John H. Parker, Thompson arranged for the informal formation of a Gatling gun unit, with fifteen weapons and a generous supply of ammunition, all shipped to Cuba on Thompson's sole authority. This unit later played a significant role in the Battle of San Juan Hill.

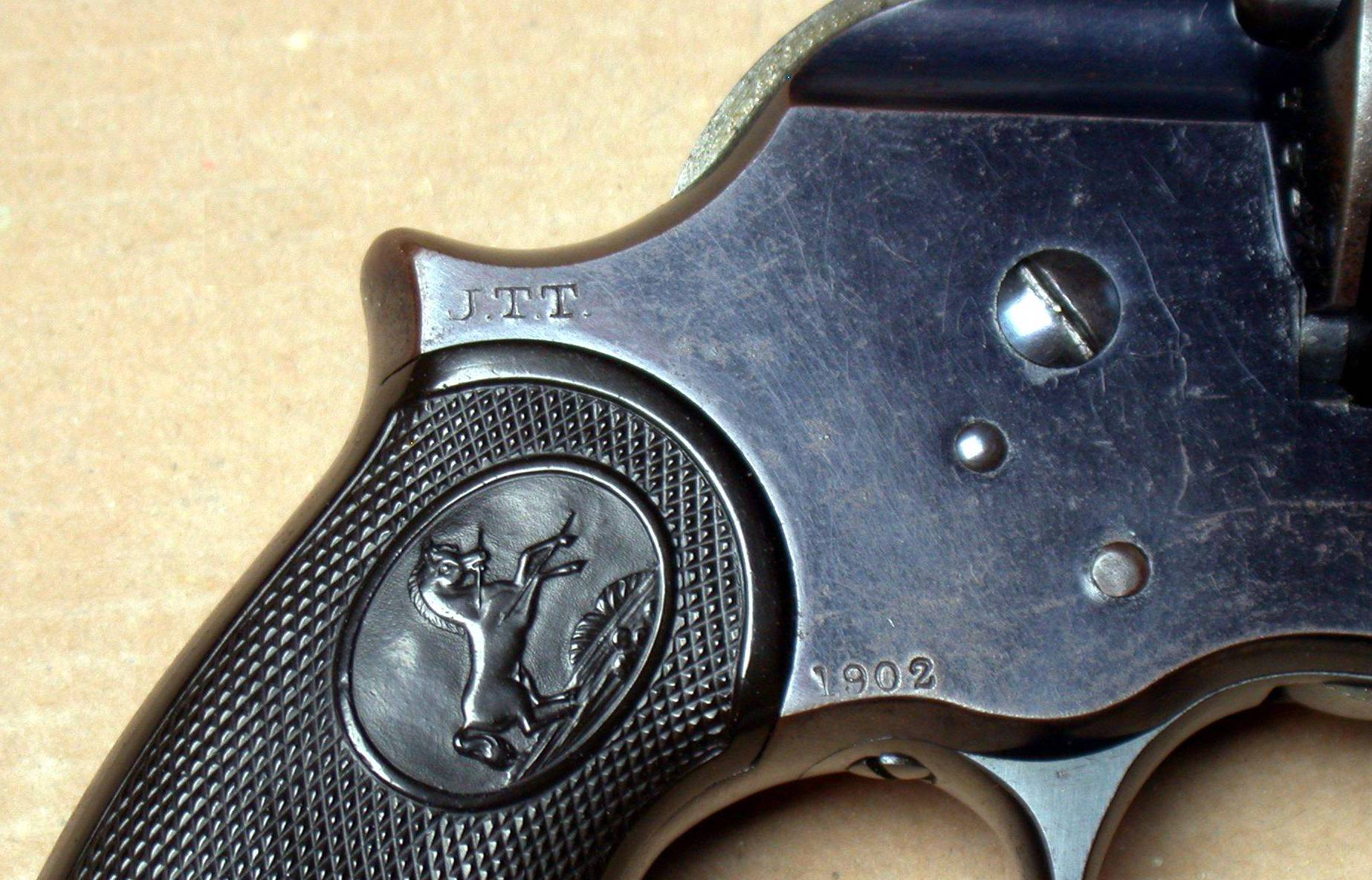
Thompson's J.T.T inspector mark on a Colt Philippine Model of 1902 DA Revolver

After the war, Thompson was appointed the chief of the Small Arms Division for the Ordnance Department. While in this position he supervised the development of the M1903 Springfield rifle and chaired the ordnance board that approved the M1911 pistol. For the latter, he devised unusual tests involving firing the weapon at donated human cadavers and live cattle to assess ammunition effectiveness.

== World War I ==
World War I began in Europe in 1914, and Thompson was sympathetic to the Allied cause. Since the U.S. did not immediately enter the war, and because he recognized a significant need for small arms in Europe (as well as an opportunity to make a substantial profit), Thompson retired from the Army in November of that year and took a job as Chief Engineer of the Remington Arms Company. While with the company he supervised the construction of the Eddystone Arsenal in Chester, Pennsylvania, at that time the largest small arms plant in the world. It manufactured Pattern 1914 Enfield rifles for British forces, and Mosin–Nagant rifles for Russia.

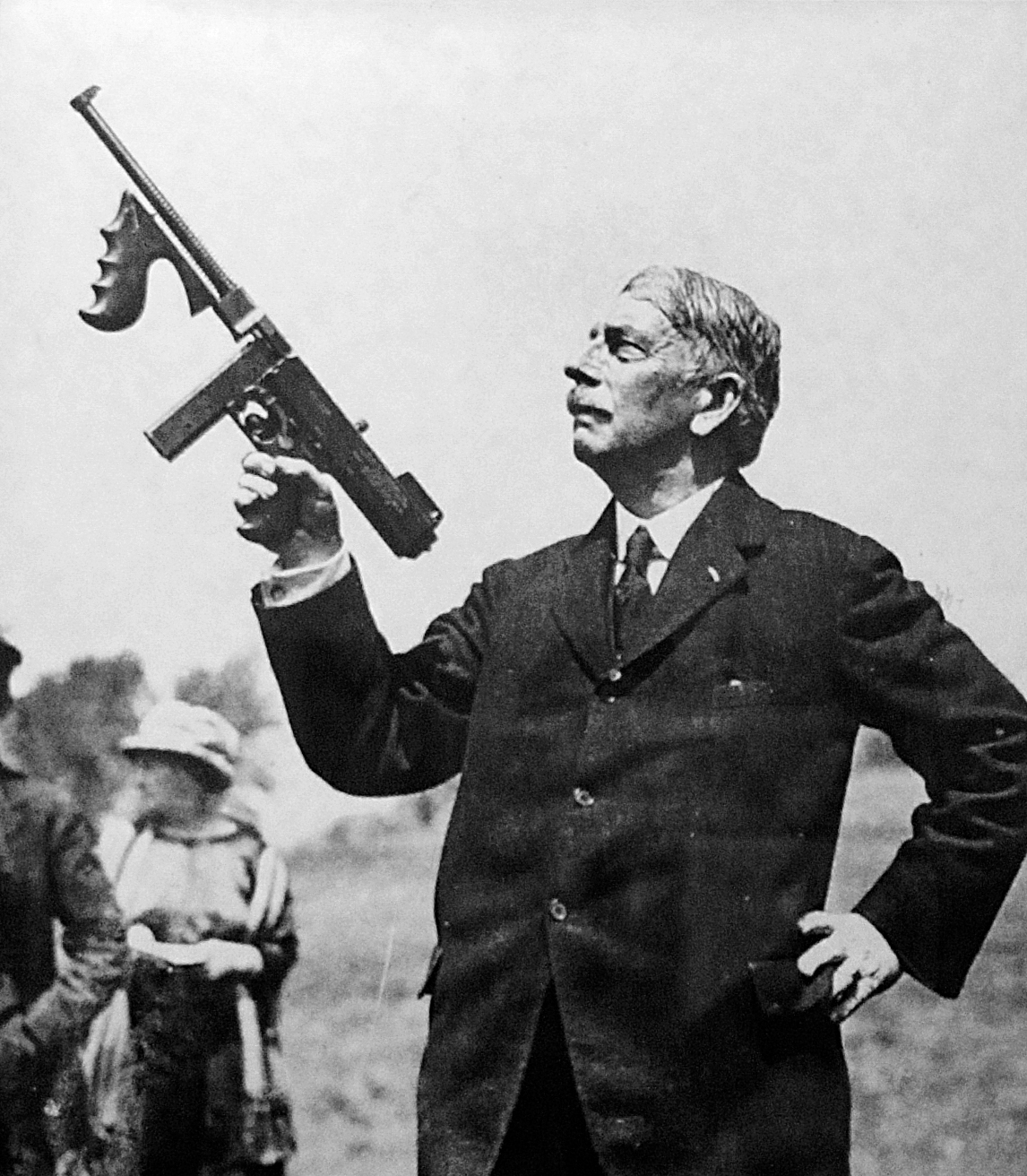
General John T. Thompson holding an M1921

The introduction of trench warfare in the war changed tactics substantially, and by 1916 Thompson was experimenting again with automatic small arms, this time attempting to design a weapon that troops could use to clear an enemy trench—what he called a "trench broom". Thompson studied several designs and was impressed with a delayed-blowback breech system designed by John Blish, a commander in the United States Navy. With Blish as a partner, Thompson obtained the necessary venture capital to form the Auto-Ordnance Company, and began working on the design of what eventually became the Thompson submachine gun.

When the United States finally entered the war in April 1917, Thompson returned to the Army and was promoted to the rank of brigadier general. He served as Director of Arsenals throughout the remainder of the war, in which capacity he supervised all small-arms production for the Army. For this service he was awarded the Army Distinguished Service Medal, the citation for which reads:

The President of the United States of America, authorized by Act of Congress, July 9, 1918, takes pleasure in presenting the Army Distinguished Service Medal to Colonel (Ordnance Corps) John Taliaferro Thompson, United States Army, for exceptionally meritorious and distinguished services to the Government of the United States, in a duty of great responsibility during World War I, as Chief of the Small Arms Division of the Office of the Chief of Ordnance, in which capacity he was charged with the design and production of all small arms and ammunition thereby supplied to the United States Army, which results he achieved with such signal success that serviceable rifles and ample ammunition therefore were at all times available for all troops ready to receive and use them.

He retired again after the war, in December 1918, and resumed work perfecting the "Tommy Gun".

Thompson originally pursued the Autorifle concept: a rifle utilizing the Blish principle delayed-blowback action to avoid the complexity of recoil-operated and gas-operated actions. Testing found that the military issue .30-06 cartridge was too powerful to work satisfactorily using the Blish system.

Thompson eventually decided to use the same .45 caliber ammunition in the Thompson submachine gun that he had vetted for use in the M1911 while in the Army. The weapon was patented in 1920, but the major source for contracts had ended with the armistice. Thompson, therefore, marketed the weapon to civilian law enforcement agencies, who bought it in respectable quantities. However, by 1928, low sales had led the company to the financial crisis, and Thompson was replaced as head of the Auto-Ordnance Company.

== Personal life ==
Thompson married Juliet Estelle Hagans. Their son Marcellus Hagans Thompson was a 1906 West Point graduate who retired from the Army in 1919 as a captain to join his father's automatic weapons business.

== Death ==
Thompson died at the age of 79 on June 21, 1940, and is buried on the grounds of the United States Military Academy in West Point, New York. Shortly after his death, the looming entry of the U.S. into World War II prompted the Army to order the Thompson submachine gun in large quantities, and it was used extensively during that conflict in both original and modified versions.
