= William Herbert Allaire Jr. =

United States Army general

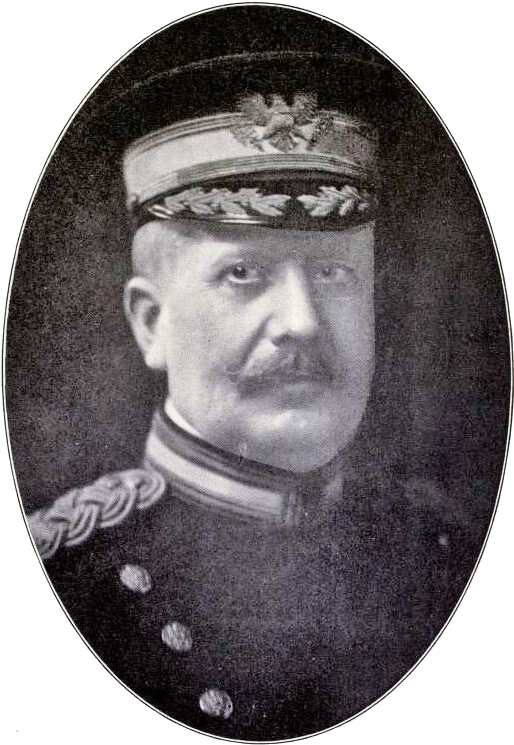
- Born: January 1, 1858; Pocahontas, Arkansas, U.S.
- Died: May 1, 1933 (aged 75); Santa Monica, California, U.S.
- Burial place: United States Military Academy Post Cemetery, West Point, Orange County, New York, United States
- Spouse: Florence Benton Whitehead
- Military career
- Allegiance: United States
- Branch: United States Army
- Service years: 1882–1921
- Rank: Brigadier General
- Unit: Infantry Branch
- Commands: 23rd Division (Adjutant General of the District of Columbia National Guard); Battalion, 4th Infantry Regiment; 16th Infantry Regiment; 166th Infantry Brigade
- Conflicts: World War I Mexican Punitive Expedition
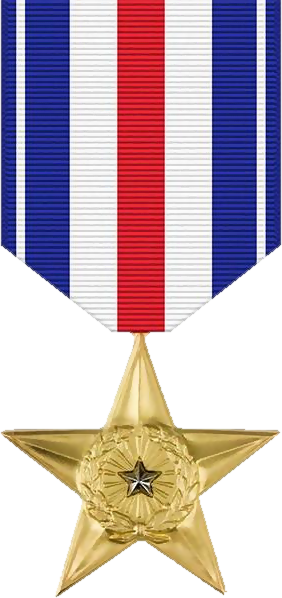
- Awards: Silver Star

William Herbert Allaire Jr. (January 1, 1858 – May 1, 1933) was an Army officer and later an American Brigadier general active during World War I.

== Early life ==
Allaire was born in Pocahontas, Arkansas. In June 1882, he graduated number thirty-three in a class of thirty-seven from the United States Military Academy (USMA) at West Point, New York. Among his classmates there at the academy were several men who would, like Allaire himself, eventually attain the rank of brigadier general or higher during their military careers, such as Edward Burr, Lansing H. Beach, Adelbert Cronkhite, John T. Thompson, Charles Treat, Edward A. Millar, Richard W. Young, Benjamin Alvord Jr., George W. McIver, Henry T. Allen, William H. Sage, and Thomas B. Dugan.

== Career ==
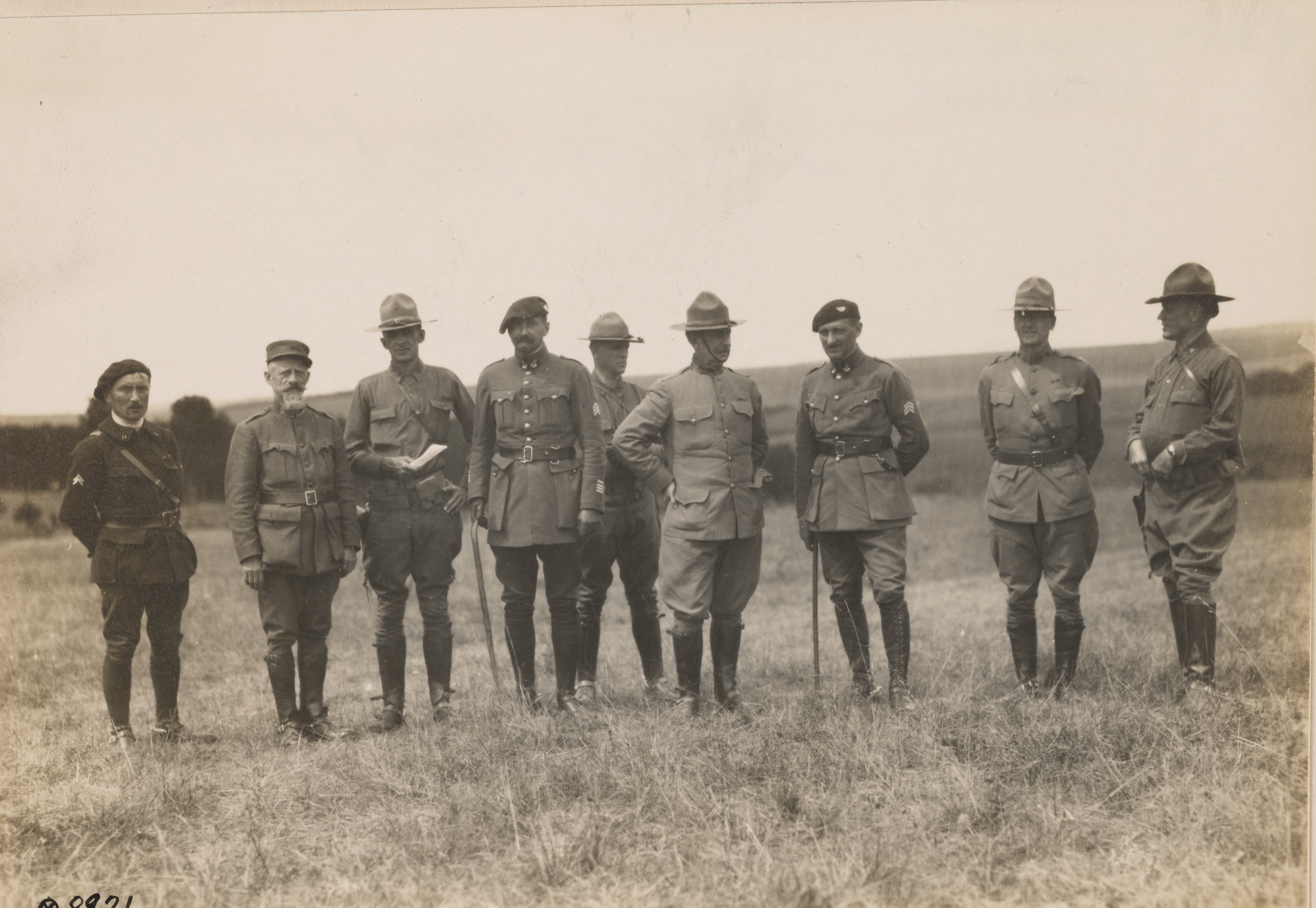
Officers of the 16th Infantry Regiment with French interpreters from the 47th Division, August 1917. Standing seventh from the left is Colonel William H. Allaire.

Allaire was commissioned in the 23rd Infantry and his first two years were spent on the southwestern frontier. He was at Fort Wayne and then transferred to Texas from 1890 to 1893. From 1893-1897 he was an instructor at the United States Military Academy, after which he was appointed Adjutant-General of the District of Columbia National Guard. In February 1899 to July 1901, Allaire was sent the Philippines where he commanded a company. While there, he earned a Silver Star commendation.

After arriving back in the United States, he served at Fort McPherson in Georgia and Plattsburg Barracks until April 1903 when he returned to his regiment in the Philippines, where he stayed until December 1904.

After coming back to the United States a second time, Allaire performed recruiting duty until 1908 when he became military attaché at the American Embassy in Vienna. Upon his return in 1911, he served in the office of the Chief of Staff in Washington for a short time before joining the Fourth Infantry at Fort Crook in Nebraska.

From 1912-1915, Allaire was again in the Philippines. In October 1915, he commanded the 16th Infantry, taking over from Omar Bundy, and took part in the Mexican Punitive Expedition, he also took this unit to France in June 1917. On August 5, 1917, Allaire became a brigadier general and provost-marshal general of the American Expeditionary Forces, and in June 1918, he was promoted to commanding general of the district of Paris. One month later he was sent on special duty with Field Marshal Sir Douglas Haig at the headquarters of the British Expeditionary Force. From August to November 1918, he commanded the 166th Infantry Brigade, then was put on special duty in Paris until June 1919 after which he was sent back to the United States. He was put on special duty at Governor's Island in New York until his retirement as a colonel on December 15, 1921.

== Awards ==
In addition to receiving the Silver Star in the Philippines, he was decorated by the Austrian government and received the Legion of Honor from France. His rank of brigadier general was restored by an act of Congress in June 1930.

== Death and legacy ==
William Herbert Allaire Jr. died at the age of seventy-five on May 1, 1933, in Santa Monica, California. Allaire and his wife Florence Benton (Whitehead) Allaire were buried at the West Point Cemetery.

== Bibliography ==
- Davis, Henry Blaine Jr. Generals in Khaki. Raleigh, NC: Pentland Press, 1998. ISBN 1571970886 OCLC 231779136
- Marquis Who's Who, Inc. Who Was Who in American History, the Military. Chicago: Marquis Who's Who, 1975. ISBN 0837932017 OCLC 657162692
