= George W. McIver =

United States Army general

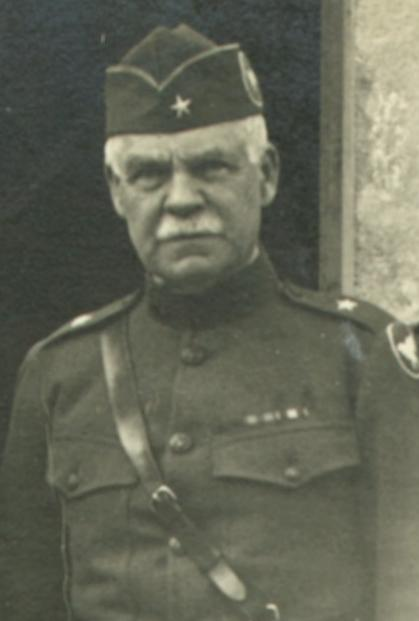
- Born: February 22, 1858; Carthage, North Carolina, U.S.
- Died: May 9, 1947 (aged 89); Washington, D.C., U.S.
- Burial place: Arlington National Cemetery, Virginia, United States
- Military career
- Allegiance: United States
- Branch: United States Army
- Service years: 1882–1922
- Rank: Brigadier General
- Service number: 0-113
- Unit: Infantry Branch
- Commands: School of Musketry; Militia Bureau; 161st Brigade
- Conflicts: American Indian Wars; Spanish–American War; World War I
- Awards: Silver Star; Purple Heart; Croix de Guerre (France)

Brigadier General George Willcox McIver (February 22, 1858 – May 9, 1947) was a United States Army officer who served as acting Chief of the Militia Bureau and commanded the 81st Division's 161st Brigade in World War I.

== Early life ==
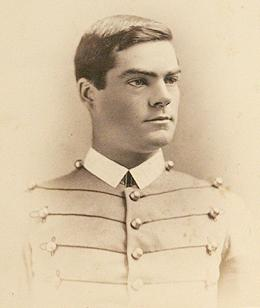
George W. McIver as a cadet at the United States Military Academy, 1882.

George Willcox (sometimes spelled Wilcox) McIver was born in Carthage, North Carolina, on February 22, 1858. He attended the University of North Carolina at Chapel Hill from 1869 to 1870 while his father was a professor there, graduated from the United States Military Academy (USMA) at West Point, New York, in June 1882 and received his commission as a second lieutenant of infantry. Among his classmates there were several men who would, like McIver himself, eventually attain the rank of general officer, such as Adelbert Cronkhite, Henry Tureman Allen, Richard W. Young, Edward Alexander Millar, Charles Treat, Lansing Hoskins Beach, William H. Sage, Edward Burr, Thomas Buchanan Dugan, Benjamin Alvord Jr., William Herbert Allaire Jr. and John T. Thompson

Initially assigned to the 17th Infantry Regiment, McIver served throughout the western United States during the American Indian Wars, including postings to Forts Pembina, Fred Steele, Laramie, Logan, and Bridger. In 1885 he was part of a force sent to Rock Springs, Wyoming, to intervene during unrest between Chinese and white miners (the Rock Springs Massacre). McIver participated in the Sioux Campaign of 1890–1891. He served as a tactical officer at the USMA from 1891 to 1893, and was assigned to Camp Pilot Butte (also known as Camp Rock Springs), Wyoming, from 1893 to 1894, after which he was posted as the Regular Army officer advising the California National Guard.

== Spanish–American War ==
In 1898, he returned to the 7th Infantry for service in Cuba during the Spanish–American War, and took part in the battles of El Caney and San Juan Hill.

== Post Spanish–American War ==
From 1898 to 1900, McIver was stationed at Fort Brady, Michigan, and at Leech Lake Indian Agency in Walker, Minnesota. From 1900 to 1901, he was stationed at Forts Davis and St. Michael, Alaska. McIver was on recruiting duty in Portland, Oregon, from 1901 to 1903.

He was assigned to the Philippines from 1903 until 1905.

From 1905 to 1907 McIver was commandant of the U.S. Military prison on Alcatraz Island in San Francisco Bay. He supervised the construction of buildings erected in Golden Gate Park to provide temporary housing for people whose homes were destroyed in the 1906 San Francisco earthquake.

In 1907, he became the commandant of the School of Musketry in Monterey, California, and he was also responsible for the publication of the Army Small Arms Firing Manual. He served again in the Philippines from 1912 to 1914. In 1915, McIver was assigned as executive officer of the National Guard Bureau. From September to October, 1916, he served as acting Chief of the Militia Bureau during the interregnum between the death of Albert L. Mills and the arrival of Mills' replacement, William A. Mann.

== World War I ==
In 1917, the same year of the American entry into World War I, McIver was, on August 5, 1917, promoted to brigadier general and took command of the 161st Brigade of the 81st (Wildcat) Division. The 81st Division was made up largely of recruits from North and South Carolina, and trained in South Carolina at Camp Sevier (near Greenville) and Camp Jackson (near Wildcat Creek, which gave the division its nickname).

McIver led the brigade during combat on the Western Front in France, including participation in the Meuse-Argonne Offensive. While serving as brigade commander, he also served on three occasions as interim commander of the 81st Division between December, 1917 and July, 1918. McIver had a mixed record on the issue of race, but was regarded as more progressive than his peers. Though he worked to have Puerto Rican soldiers transferred from the 161st Brigade, he successfully integrated Lumbees and other Native Americans from North Carolina. In addition, based on his Indian Wars experience, he expressed the view that African Americans made good soldiers and should be allowed to serve, though he also believed that they could do so successfully only if led by white officers.

At the end of World War I, McIver was recommended for the Army Distinguished Service Medal, but it does not appear to have been approved.

== Post World War I ==
Following the war, McIver returned to his permanent rank of colonel. From 1919 until his retirement in 1922, he commanded first the Demobilization Group at Fort Pike, near Little Rock, Arkansas (now Camp Joseph T. Robinson) and then the recruit depot at Fort Slocum, New York.

== Death and burial ==
In retirement, McIver resided in Washington, D.C. In 1930, due to an act of Congress, which enabled general officers who had served in World War I to retire at the highest rank they had held during the war, he was promoted to brigadier general on the retired list. He died in Washington, D.C., on May 9, 1947. He is buried in Arlington National Cemetery, Section 6, Site 5680A.

== Family ==
In 1893, McIver married Helen Howard Smedberg (1869–1953). They were the parents of two daughters and three sons:

- Frances (1896–1968), the wife of Navy officer Paul Mefford Runyon
- George Jr. (1897–1962), a graduate of the United States Naval Academy, business executive, Navy officer, and Army officer during World War I
- Renwick (1901–1987), also a graduate of the United States Naval Academy and Navy officer
- Alexander (1907–1956), a graduate of the Virginia Military Institute and Army officer
- Cora (1912–1971), the wife of government policy specialist and conservationist Harold H. Leich

Helen McIver was the daughter of William R. Smedberg (1839–1911), a veteran of the Union Army who remained in the military after the American Civil War and retired as a lieutenant colonel. Her brother William R. Smedberg Jr. was a career Army officer who attained the rank of brigadier general during World War I. Her nephew William R. Smedberg III (1902–1994), was a Navy vice admiral who served as Superintendent of the Naval Academy. Her grandnephew William R. Smedberg IV (1929–2008) was also a career Navy officer, and he attained the rank of rear admiral.

== Legacy ==
The George Willcox McIver Papers are part of the East Carolina University's Joyner Library collections.

McIver's autobiography, A Life of Duty: The Autobiography of George Willcox McIver, 1858–1948, was edited by Jonathan Dembo and published in 2006.

== Bibliography ==
- Davis, Henry Blaine Jr. (1998). Generals in Khaki. Raleigh, North Carolina: Pentland Press. ISBN 1571970886. OCLC 40298151.

Military offices
Preceded by Albert L. Mills	Chief of the National Guard Bureau; 1916	Succeeded by William A. Mann
