= Lansing Hoskins Beach =

United States Army general (1860–1945)

Lansing Beach
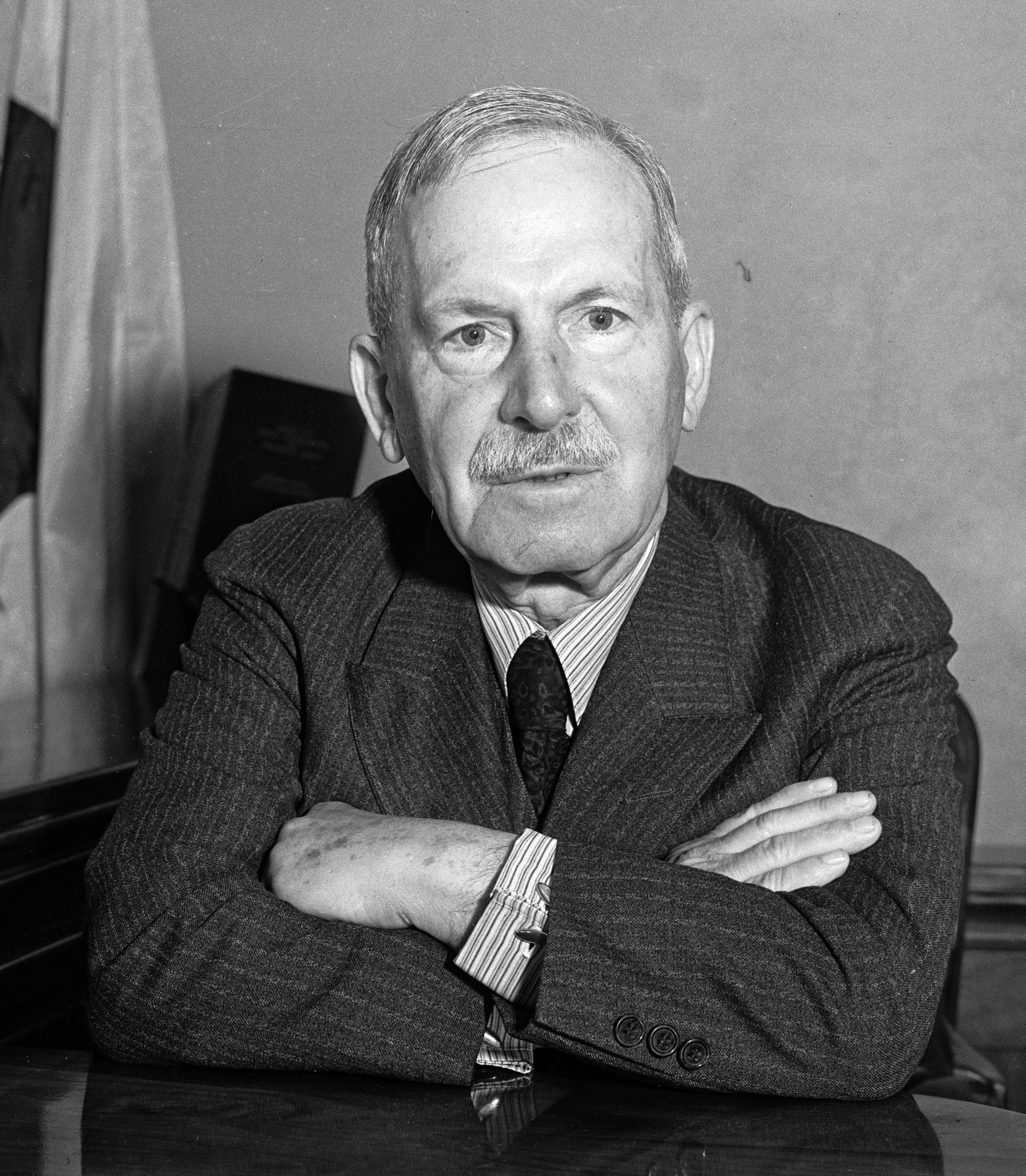
- Beach in 1935
- Born: June 18, 1860; Dubuque, Iowa, US
- Died: April 2, 1945 (aged 84); Pasadena, California, US
- Military career
- Branch: United States Army
- Service years: 1882–1924
- Rank: Major General
- Commands: Chief of Engineers

Engineer Commissioner of the District of Columbia
- In office May 26, 1898 – October 31, 1901
- Preceded by: William Murray Black
- Succeeded by: John Biddle

Lansing Beach (June 18, 1860 – April 2, 1945) was a U.S. Army officer who served for a time as Chief of Engineers.

== Early life ==
Born in Dubuque, Iowa, Beach graduated third in a class of thirty-seven in the United States Military Academy (USMA) class of 1882 and was commissioned in the Corps of Engineers of the United States Army. Among his classmates there at the academy were several men who would, like Beach himself, eventually attain the rank of brigadier general or higher during their military careers, such as Edward Burr, Adelbert Cronkhite, John T. Thompson, Charles Treat, Edward A. Millar, Richard W. Young, Benjamin Alvord Jr., George W. McIver, Henry T. Allen, William H. Sage, and Thomas B. Dugan, and William H. Allaire.

== Military career ==
Beach developed plans for the reconstruction of the Muskingum River locks and dams soon after Ohio ceded the state-built improvements to the federal government in 1887. From 1894 to 1901 he worked on public improvements in the District of Columbia, serving as Engineer Commissioner there in 1898–1901. As Detroit District Engineer in 1901–05, he oversaw harbor improvements as far west as Duluth. Beach supervised improvements along the Louisiana Gulf Coast in 1908–12 and in Baltimore in 1912–15. He also oversaw the entire Gulf Division in six of those seven years and the Central Division in 1915–20. In the latter capacity and as Chief of Engineers, he oversaw construction of the huge Wilson Locks and Dam on the Tennessee River. Beach also served on the Mississippi River Commission and the Board of Engineers for Rivers and Harbors. After his four-year tour as Chief of Engineers, he retired on June 18, 1924. After retirement, General Beach served as consulting engineer for various business interests in the United States and Mexico. He was President of the American Society of Military Engineers, and a member of the International Water Commission from 1924 to 1930.

Beach died in Pasadena, California on April 2, 1945. He was interred at Arlington National Cemetery beside his wife Anna May (Dillon) Beach (1861–1934) on January 29, 1946.

Military offices
Preceded by William Murray Black	Chief of Engineers; 1920–1924	Succeeded by Harry Taylor
