= Henry Tureman Allen =

United States Army general

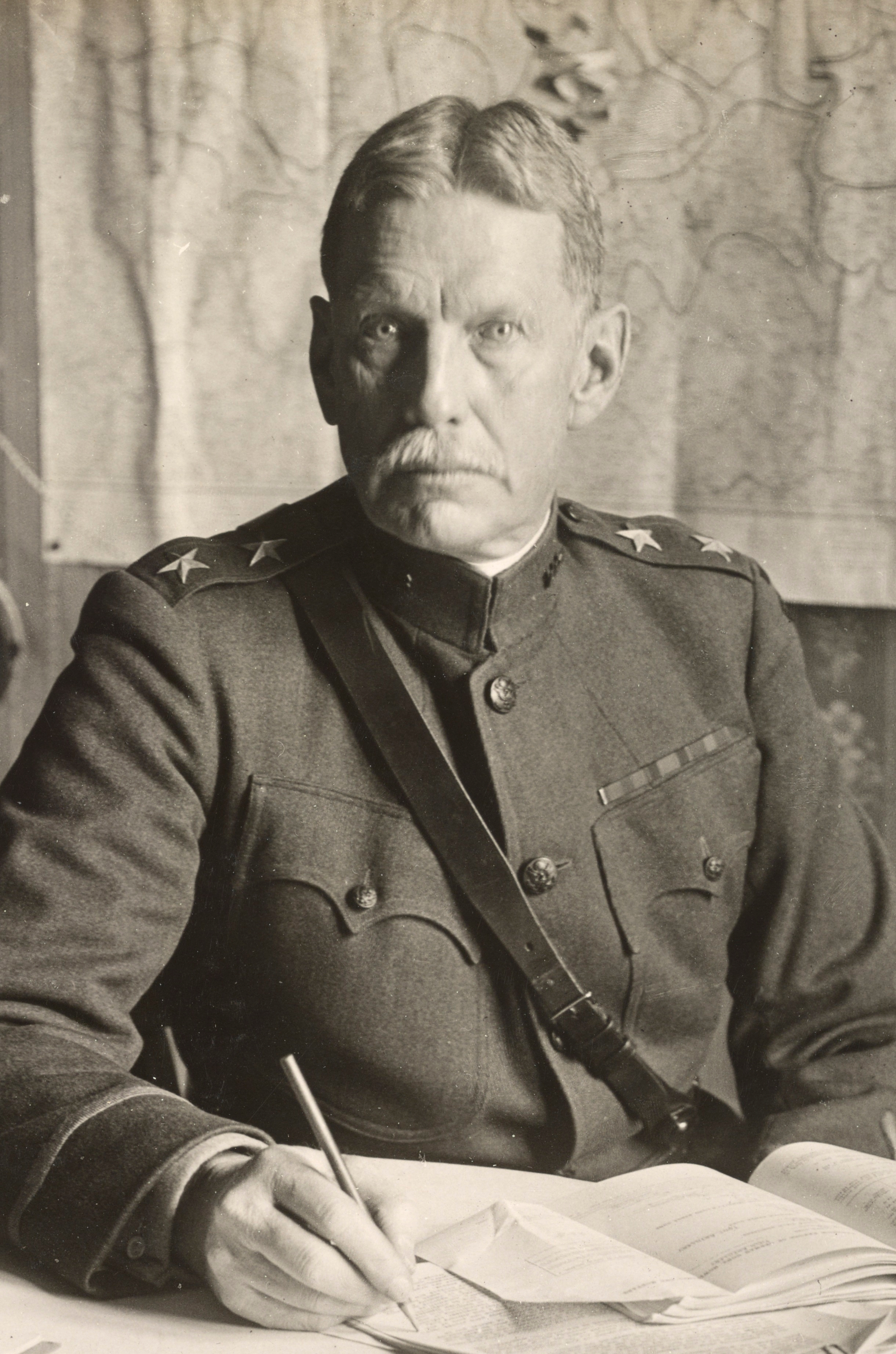
- Allen in uniform, 1919
- Born: April 13, 1859; Sharpsburg, Kentucky, U.S.
- Died: August 29, 1930 (aged 71); Buena Vista, Pennsylvania, U.S.
- Burial place: Arlington National Cemetery
- Children: 3 (including Henry Jr.)
- Relatives: Frank M. Andrews (son-in-law)
- Military career
- Branch: United States Army
- Service years: 1882–1923
- Rank: Major General
- Nickname: "Iron Commandante"
- Service number: O-27
- Commands: 2d Cavalry; 8th Cavalry; 90th Division
- Conflicts: American Indian Wars; Spanish–American War; Philippine–American War; Border War; World War I
- Awards: Distinguished Service Medal

Major General Henry Tureman Allen (April 13, 1859 – August 29, 1930) was a senior United States Army officer known for exploring the Copper River in Alaska in 1885 along with the Tanana and Koyukuk rivers by transversing 1,500 miles (2,400 km) of wilderness, an accomplishment which Nelson A. Miles compared to that of Lewis and Clark.

Born in Sharpsburg, Kentucky, Allen graduated from West Point in 1882, and was commissioned as a second lieutenant of cavalry. He served on the staff of General Nelson A. Miles. He later served as a military attaché to Russia (1890–1895) and Germany (1897–1898). Allen also served in the Spanish–American War in the Battle of El Caney. He was then stationed to the Philippines to serve as military governor of Leyte in 1901. Eventually he organized and commanded the Philippine Constabulary, before going on in 1904 as an observer with the Japanese Army in Korea.

During World War I, Allen was promoted to brigadier general and given command of the 90th Division, a National Army (present-day United States Army Reserve) division based in Texas. His instructions were to bring them to full strength and convey them to the Western Front in June 1918. He succeeded Pierrepont Noyes as U.S. Commissioner in the Inter-Allied Rhineland High Commission.

== Early life and education ==
Allen was born on April 13, 1859, in Sharpsburg, Kentucky. His parents were Susan (Shumate) and Sanford Allen and he was the thirteenth of fourteen children. After attending Peeks Mill Military Academy, Allen attended Georgetown College and graduated in 1878. Then, intent on a military career, he transferred to the United States Military Academy (USMA) at West Point, New York. Once he graduated from the academy in June 1882, he accepted a commission in the cavalry. Among his classmates there at the academy were several men who would, like Allen himself (who graduated 20th in a class of 37), eventually attain the rank of brigadier general or higher during their military careers, such as Edward Burr, Lansing H. Beach, Adelbert Cronkhite, John T. Thompson, Charles Treat, Edward A. Millar, Richard W. Young, Benjamin Alvord Jr., George W. McIver, William H. Sage, Thomas B. Dugan, and William H. Allaire.

From 1888 until 1890, Allen worked as an instructor at West Point. He then served on duty in the American Old West at Fort Keogh, Montana Territory and guarded the Northern Pacific Railroad while it was under construction and then served as a military attache to Russia (1890–1895) and Germany (1897–1898).

== Early military career ==
Allen was very satisfied when he was first assigned to serve in Alaska in 1884. He wrote to his fiancée that, "I am willing to forgo almost any benefit that I might receive by going East for an attempt at exploration in Alaska." At the time Allen was ranked as a lieutenant and served as General Nelson A. Miles's aide-de-camp. He supervised Lieutenant William R. Abercrombie's shipments from Sitka to Nuchek. Allen was later sent by Miles to search for Abercrombie, whom Miles had sent to explore the Copper River. Eventually, Allen discovered Abercrombie close to the mouth of the river. Due to the moving glaciers and rough terrain, Abercrombie did not succeed in going more than 60 miles (97 km) up the river.

Following the expeditions of Frederick Schwatka, which covered a lot of Alaskan land but did not contribute much to a map of the area, and Abercrombie, who had failed to make it through the lower canyons of the Copper, Allen devised a plan to explore both the Tanana and Copper rivers, which were two of the biggest uncharted rivers in Alaska. Miles gave permission for Allen to go ahead with his plan, however Miles had wanted at minimum four to ten men and one medical officer to be included on the trip. Allen insisted on only three men including himself and General Philip Sheridan finally approved of Allen's original trio plan. With Sgt. Cady Robertson and Pvt. Fred Fickett and $2,000, in the spring of 1885, Allen arrived at the Copper River Delta. Allen's plan of action was to reach the headwaters of the Copper River on ice. Though he had little proper food, faced freezing rain, and difficult terrain, Allen continued to move ahead north along the river. John Bremner joined the expedition when Allen came to Taral, an Indian village. Although Allen's supplies were dwindling, he was able to explore the Chitina River, the Copper River's major tributary. During the expedition, Allen learned how to build and navigate skin boats like the Indians in the region. With these boats they moved upriver, losing more and more provisions along the way. On one occasion they had to eat "rotten, wormy meat."

After the detachment took up new guides, Allen and his men decided to leave the Copper River and cross into the Alaska Range through a portal that Allen named Miles Pass. They became the first men to cross into interior Alaska through the Alaska Range and first men to chart the rugged river and one of the highest mountain ranges in North America. When one of the enlisted men and Bremner received scurvy from their poor diets, Allen refrained from exploring the Tanana to its headwaters and decided to head to a trading post at its mouth. The post was more than 560 miles (900 km) away and they were to pass through land supposedly belonging to hostile Indians. Briefly after arriving at the Tanana, Allen met the reportedly hostile natives and learned relieving that they were only interested in the pills Allen had with him.

In total, Allen had explored through roughly 1,500 miles (2,400 km) in unexplored wilderness in only five months time. General Miles stated that Allen's expedition, "exceeded all explorations on the American continent since Lewis and Clark."

== Spanish-American War and Philippines ==
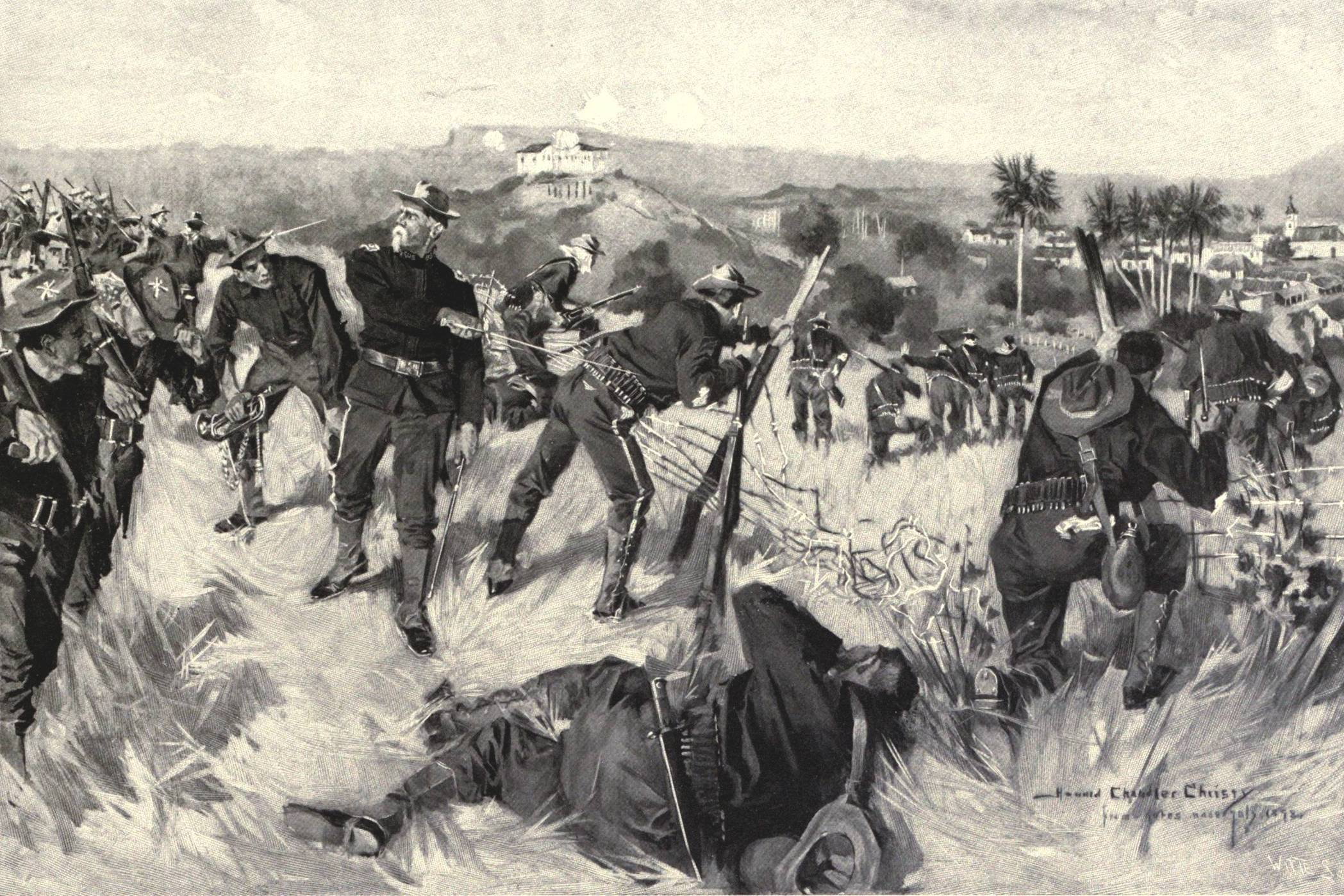
The Capture of El Caney (1899)

After the Spanish–American War began in April 1898, Allen left from his position in Germany and by June 1898 was placed in command of Troop D of the 2d Cavalry. He then became a major of volunteers and was ordered off to Cuba. He and the volunteers served as scouts and on escort duty during the Santiago Land Campaign. They also fought on July 1, 1898, in the Battle of El Caney. On July 10, Allen took control of the town and its camp containing over 20,000 refugees. Though there was not adequate food nor medicine, a disaster was averted when Santiago de Cuba surrendered only six days later, allowing the refugees to return to their homes. Allen then developed a case of malaria or yellow fever and had to go back to the United States to recover. His service in the war made him highly regarded by Theodore Roosevelt. Roosevelt would later try to make Allen part of a planned division of volunteers during World War I, but the division was never formed.

Allen was promoted to the rank of captain in the regular army in the autumn of 1898 and went back to Berlin, Germany as an attaché. Wanting to see battle again in 1899, he transferred to the 43d Volunteer Infantry as a major. He was placed in command of the 3rd Battalion on the island of Samar. During this period, he managed to successfully recruit members for the Philippine Scouts and fight against insurgents. After peace was achieved on Samar, Allen commanded one of the three sections of Leyte. He gave fair treatment to the local civilians and even worked on several projects to improve Leyte. Allen wanted strict observance of the laws of war and led patrols to enforce them. He became known as "Iron Commandante" to the locals due to his strict, but humane style of governing.

Once Allen felt that the war had ended in his district he volunteered to serve in China to suppress the Boxer Rebellion, but was denied because his service in the Philippines was considered more important. For a short while, Allen served as the governor of Leyte between April and June 1901. After this, he was chosen to found the Philippine Constabulary because of his success in the recruitment of members for the Philippine Scouts, his ability to speak Spanish, and his record on Leyte. The intention of the constabulary was to fill the gap between the American forces and the Filipino police on the Philippine Islands. It was made up of both Filipino constables and American officers and helped to the islands stabilized. The constabulary aided in the suppression of the rebellion, guarded prisons, provided intelligence, and returned law and order to the islands. He stayed in command of the group up until 1907 and rose to the temporary rank of brigadier general with the command of over 10,000 men.

Allen went back to the United States in the spring of 1907 and returned to his permanent rank as a major. Next he would join the General Staff in 1910 as a cavalry expert. In August 1912, he was appointed to the rank of lieutenant colonel and then in July 1916, became a colonel. He assumed command of the 8th Cavalry and led them during the Punitive Expedition, in which Brigadier General John J. Pershing attempted to capture Pancho Villa.

== World War I ==
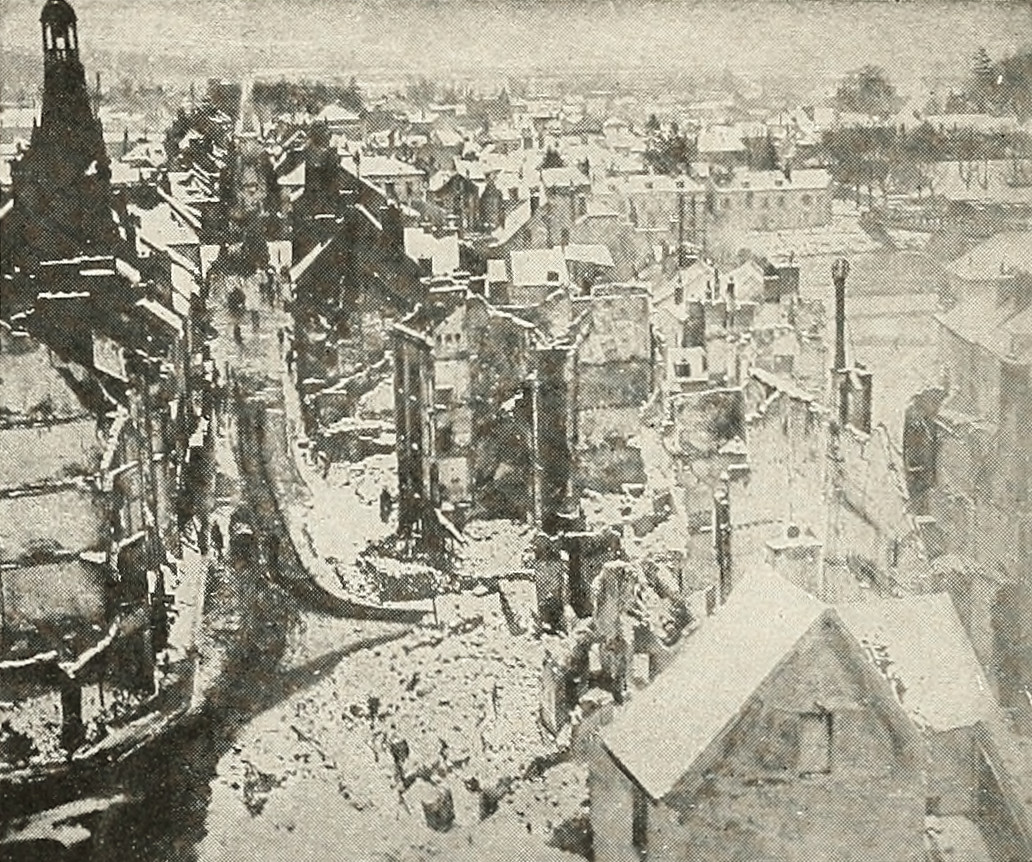
The destruction seen in Argonne Forest, France from the Meuse–Argonne offensive.

After the United States had entered World War I in April 1917, Allen was now promoted to brigadier general in May. He was made a temporary major general not long afterwards and given command of the newly activated 90th Division at Camp Travis, Texas. The unit consisted mostly of draftees from the states of Texas and Oklahoma−hence the division's T.O. insignia on its badge, together with its nickname of "Tough Ombres"−and, in its first few weeks, had many shortages including rifles, housing, artillery, uniforms, and even soldiers. By the spring of 1918, the division was short by more than 10,000 men. Despite these problems, Allen kept his men in a training program. Once he learned that the division would be joining the American Expeditionary Forces (AEF) on the Western Front in May of that year, large numbers of troops began pouring into the division. Allen added onto his training schedule and made his men run for fifteen hours a day, seven days a week. Sometime in the third week of June, the division was then shipped off to France.

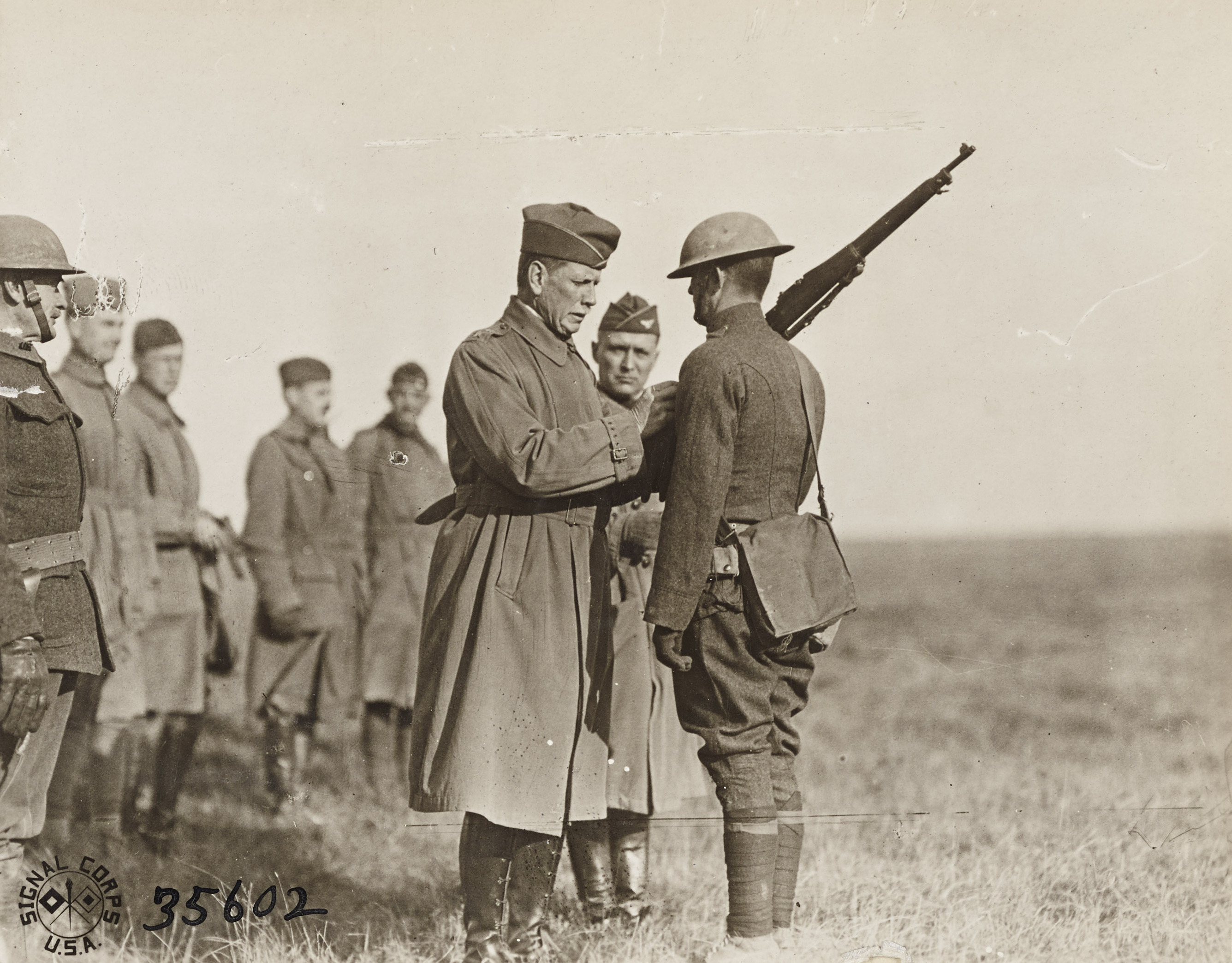
Sergeant John H. Cochrane of Company A, 357th Infantry, 90th Division, receives the Distinguished Service Cross from Allen in the Valley of the Meuse, just south of Stenay, Meuse, France, November 16, 1918.

Following even more training in northeastern Dijon, on August 24, the 90th Infantry Division entered a sector of the front on the eastern side of the St. Mihiel salient. At the time Pershing, now a full general and commander-in-chief (C-in-C) of the AEF on the Western Front (while also commanding the newly created U.S. First Army), was getting ready for his first major offensive–closing off the salient (see Battle of Saint-Mihiel). Allen's 90th Division was to form the right pivot in the offensive. It started early on September 12 when the offensive began. After a rolling barrage, the division kept moving ahead. Over the next nine hours, Allen's men captured their objectives and by September 16, the Americans had reduced the salient. After the salient was eliminated, Pershing planned for the American forces to attack west at Meuse-Argonne. In the beginning, Allen's unit stayed close to St. Mihiel, covered sectors already left vacant by the troops who went west, and grouped together their positions. Once the Meuse–Argonne battle had become more intense, Allen and his men entered the lines close to Bantheville. The 90th advanced slowly and Allen relieved officers who he found to be incompetent or weak. The division was able to get through the Meuse River near Stenay only several days before the signing of the Armistice of November 11, 1918, which ended hostilities.

Once the war had concluded, Allen was appointed commander of the American Forces in Germany by Pershing in July 1919, after conflicts with the previous commanders, Joseph T. Dickman and Hunter Liggett. He was aided in this endeavor by his chief of staff, Brigadier General William Wright Harts. For his services during the war and in the months afterward, he was awarded the Army Distinguished Service Medal, the citation for which reads:

The President of the United States of America, authorized by Act of Congress, July 9, 1918, takes pleasure in presenting the Army Distinguished Service Medal to Major General Henry Tureman Allen, United States Army, for exceptionally meritorious and distinguished services to the Government of the United States, in a duty of great responsibility during World War I. In command of the 90th Division, General Allen had the important position of conducting the right flank at the St. Mihiel Salient. The brilliant successes there gained and later repeated in the Argonne-Meuse offensive showed him to be an officer of splendid judgment, high attainment, and excellent leadership. Later he commanded the Eighth Army Corps with skill and judgment.

== Later life and death ==
From 1919 to 1923, Allen acted as a military governor of the American zone of occupation around Coblenz. He was also a member of the Inter-Allied Rhineland and High Commission. While he attempted to represent the interests of the United States, he was not provided with any specific guidance or instructions from the War and State departments. Increasingly, he acted in restraining the ambitions of the French in the region.

Allen was promoted once again to the permanent rank of major general in 1923 and retired that same year. Following retirement, he lived in Washington D.C. Over the next seven years of his life, Allen wrote two books about his time in the Rhineland, My Rhineland Journal (1923) and The Rhineland Occupation (1927). He also spoke on international politics and got involved in the Democratic Party.

Shortly after leaving his last post as U.S. military governor in Germany, Allen committed to an emergency campaign for humanitarian aid to Germany. In 1923, he launched and chaired the American Committee for Relief of German Children. It aimed to provide supplementary meals to starving children, pregnant and nursing mothers. The campaign was especially successful winning donations from the German-American community, but it worked closely with the Federal Council of Churches. Allen's campaign, which continued until mid-1924, raised $4.3 million, and at its height, it distributed meals to one million German children.

Allen served as the executive officer and vice-president of the American Olympic Committee during the 1924 Summer Olympics. In 1928, despite being nearly seventy-years-old, Allen was considered as a vice-presidential running mate for Democrat Al Smith, and received 21 votes in the balloting that resulted in the nomination of Joseph T. Robinson. On August 29, 1930, he died in Buena Vista, Pennsylvania. It was reported in The New York Times that heart disease was his cause of death during a visit to the town. Allen was buried in Arlington National Cemetery under a monument designed by the sculptor Albert Jaegers. Pershing was one of the pallbearers at the burial.

== Personal life ==
Henry Tureman Allen married his wife, Dora Johnston (1860–1932), on July 12, 1887. There were three children: Jeanette (1888–1962), Henry Jr. (1889–1971) and Daria (Dasha) (1892–1977). Jeanette was married to Lieutenant General Frank M. Andrews, after whom Andrews Air Force Base is named. Allen was also a known polo enthusiast.

== Selected works ==
- My Rhineland Journal (1923)
- The Rhineland Occupation (1927)

== Honors ==
Camp Allen, the original home of the Philippine Military Academy (which began as the officers school of the Philippine Constabulary), is named after him. In 1941, an attack transport formerly known as the Wenatchee and the President Jefferson was taken over by the U.S. navy and renamed Henry T. Allen. The Alaskan geologist, Alfred Hulse Brooks, once wrote that, "No man through his own individual explorations has added more to our knowledge of Alaska than Lieutenant Allen.". Mount Allen in Alaska is named after him. Allen, Northern Samar town in the Philippines is named in his honor.

== Popular culture ==
Eowyn Ivey's 2016 book To the Bright Edge of the World was inspired by the official reports of Allen's 1885 exploration of Alaska and the diaries of his expedition members.

== Bibliography ==
- Allen, Henry Tureman (1924). My Rhineland Journal. Hutchinson. OCLC 372950.
- Allen, Henry Tureman (1927). The Rhineland Occupation. Bobbs-Merrill. OCLC 1139246.
- Bullard, Robert Lee (2013). Fighting Generals: Illustrated Biographical Sketches of Seven Major Generals in World War I. Literary Licensing. ISBN 978-1-258-86119-3.
- Pawley, Margaret (2007). The Watch on the Rhine: The Military Occupation of the Rhineland, 1918–1930. I.B.Tauris. ISBN 978-1-84511-457-2.
- Thacker, Jack W. (1992). "Allen, Henry Tureman". In John E. Kleber (ed.). The Kentucky Encyclopedia. Associate editors: Thomas D. Clark, Lowell H. Harrison, and James C. Klotter. Lexington, Kentucky: The University Press of Kentucky. ISBN 0-8131-1772-0. Archived from the original on June 1, 2019.
- Cooke, James J. (1997). Pershing and his Generals: Command and Staff in the AEF. Praeger Publishers. ISBN 0-275-95363-7.
- Davis, Henry Blaine Jr. (1998). Generals in Khaki. Raleigh, North Carolina: Pentland Press. ISBN 1-57197-088-6. OCLC 40298151.
- Twichell, Heath (1974). Allen: the Biography of an Army Officer, 1859-1930. Rutgers University Press. ISBN 978-0-8135-0778-1.

Military offices
New division	Commanding General of the 90th Division; 1917–1918	Succeeded by Major General Charles Martin
