= General Black =

General Black may refer to:

- General Black (Kamen Rider), fictional character
- Scott C. Black (born 1952), U.S. Army lieutenant general
- William Murray Black (1855–1933), U.S. Army major general
- USS General W. M. Black, a World War II-era U.S. Navy transport ship named after William Murray Black
- Wilsone Black (1837–1909), British Army major general
- Władysław Franciszek Jabłonowski (1769–1802), Polish general of African descent

== See also ==
- Attorney General Black (disambiguation)
