= General Dugan =

General Dugan may refer to:

- Michael Dugan (general) (born 1937), U.S. Air Force four-star general
- Thomas Buchanan Dugan (1858–1940), U.S. Army brigadier general
- Winston Dugan, 1st Baron Dugan of Victoria (1876–1951), British Army major general
