= General Burr =

General Burr may refer to:

- Edward Burr (1859–1952), U.S. Army brigadier general
- George Washington Burr (1865–1923), U.S. Army major general
- Rick Burr (born 1964), Australian Army lieutenant general
