= Attorney General Black =

Attorney General Black may refer to:

- Arthur Black (Unionist politician) (1888–1968), Attorney General for Northern Ireland
- Jeremiah S. Black (1810–1883), Attorney General of the United States

== See also ==
- General Black (disambiguation)
