= Mount Allen (Alaska) =

Mountain in Alaska, United States

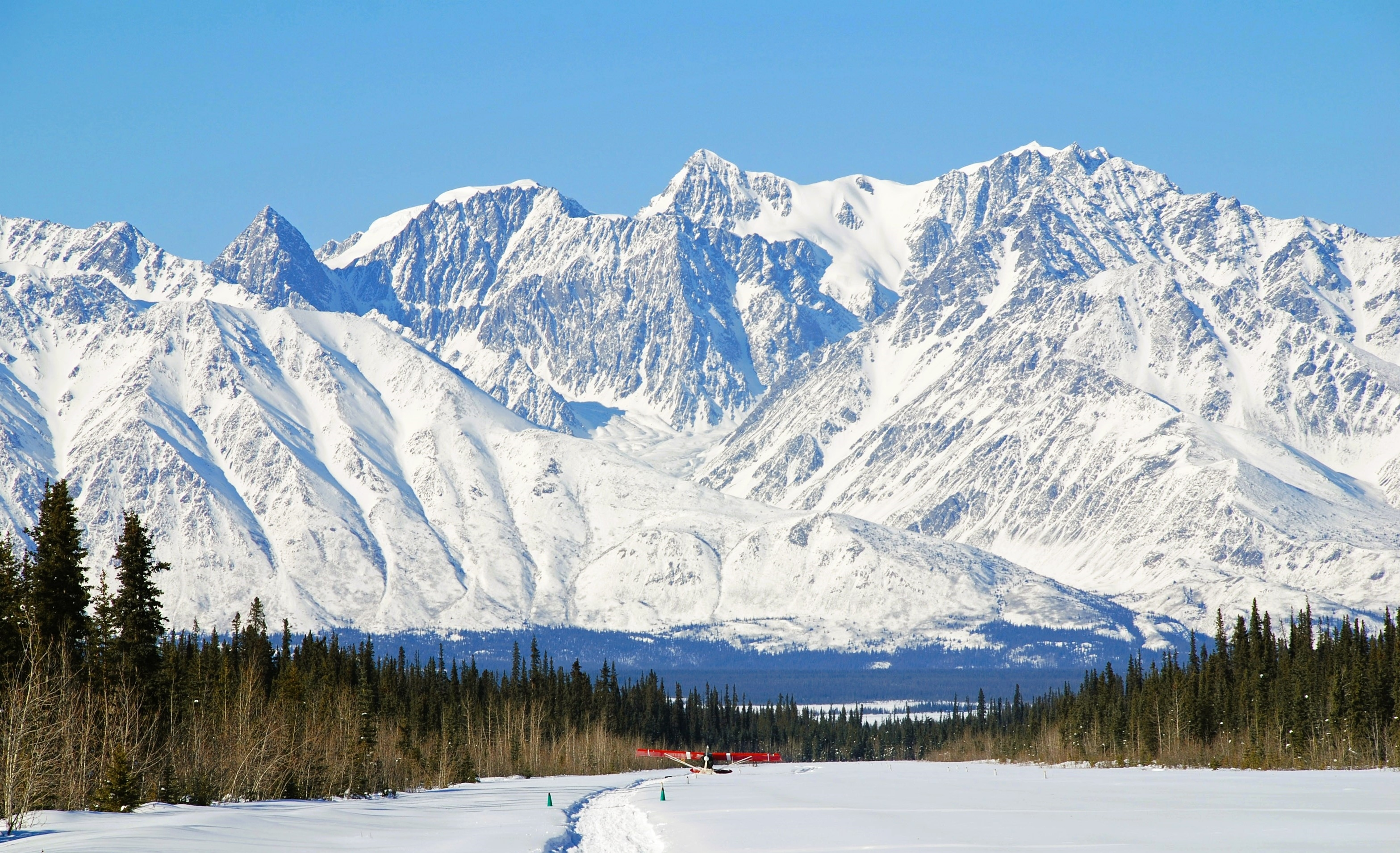
- South aspect

Highest point
- Elevation: 9,512 ft (2,899 m)
- Prominence: 4,412 ft (1,345 m)
- Parent peak: Peak 9750
- Isolation: 12.26 mi (19.73 km)
- Coordinates: 62°14′37″N 142°14′04″W

Naming
- Etymology: Henry Tureman Allen

Geography
- Location within Alaska
- Interactive map of Mount Allen
- Country: United States
- State: Alaska
- Census Area: Copper River Census Area
- Protected area: Wrangell–St. Elias National Park and Preserve
- Parent range: Wrangell Mountains
- Topo map: USGS Nabesna A-3

Mount Allen is a 9,512-foot-elevation (2,899-meter) mountain summit in Alaska, United States.

== Description ==
Mount Allen is a prominent glaciated mountain set in the Wrangell Mountains. The remote peak is located 13.5 miles (21.7 km) north-northwest of Chisana, Alaska, in Wrangell–St. Elias National Park and Preserve. Precipitation runoff from the mountain drains into tributaries of the Chisana River which is a tributary of the Tanana River. Topographic relief is significant as the summit rises 6,400 feet (1,950 m) above the Chisana River in five miles (8 km).

== Etymology ==
The mountain is named for Henry Tureman Allen (1859–1930), who explored and mapped the Copper River region in 1885. He named and measured the elevations of the region's giants such as Mount Blackburn, Mount Sanford, and Mount Drum. The mountain's toponym has been officially adopted by the U.S. Board on Geographic Names. The Upper Tanana name for this mountain is "Ch 'ank än' Choh."

== Climate ==
Based on the Köppen climate classification, Mount Allen is located in a subarctic climate zone with long, cold, snowy winters, and cool summers. Winter temperatures can drop below −20 °F with wind chill factors below −30 °F. This climate supports unnamed glaciers surrounding this peak. The months May through June offer the most favorable weather for climbing or viewing.

== See also ==
- List of mountain peaks of Alaska
- Geology of Alaska
