= Henry Allen (equestrian) =

American equestrian

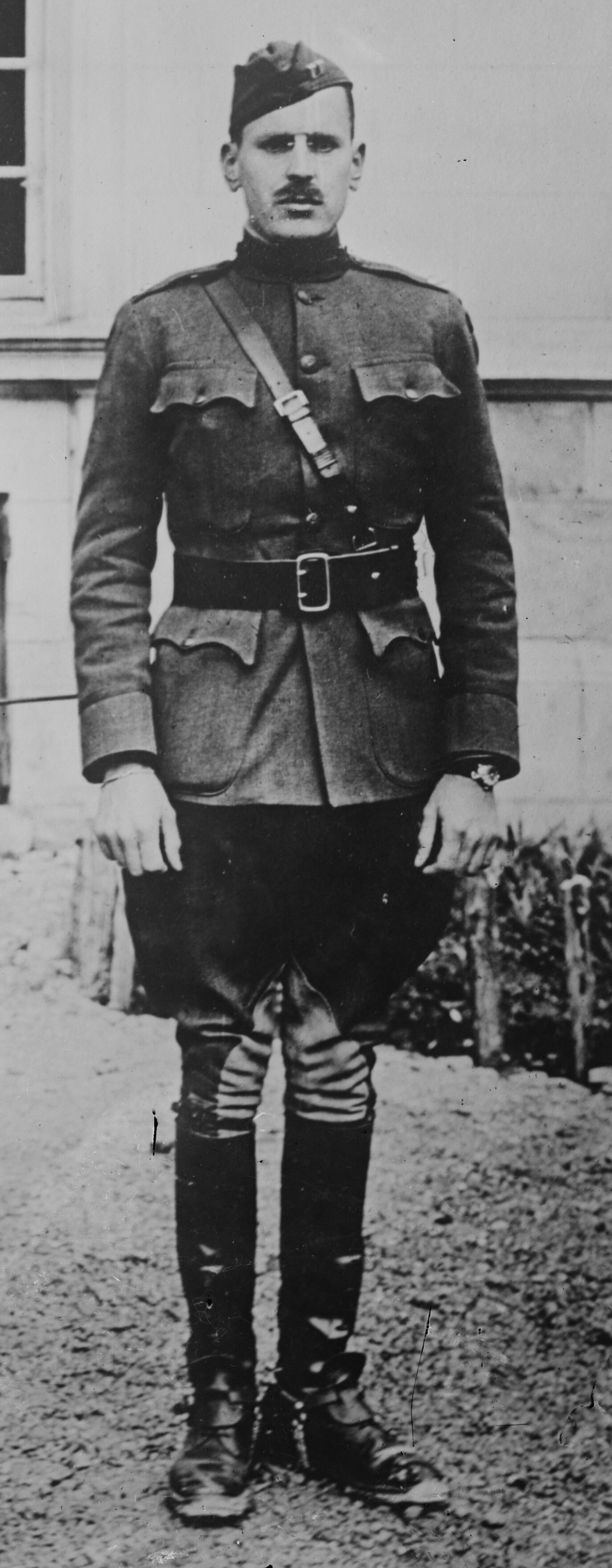

Personal information
- Full name: Henry Tureman Allen Jr.
- Born: August 11, 1889 West Point, New York, U.S.
- Died: December 21, 1971 (aged 82) Washington, District of Columbia, U.S.

Sport
- Sport: Equestrian

Henry Tureman Allen Jr. (August 11, 1889 – December 21, 1971) was an American equestrian. He competed in the individual jumping event at the 1920 Summer Olympics. He graduated from the United States Military Academy and Harvard University.
