= William Murray Black =

United States Army general

William Black
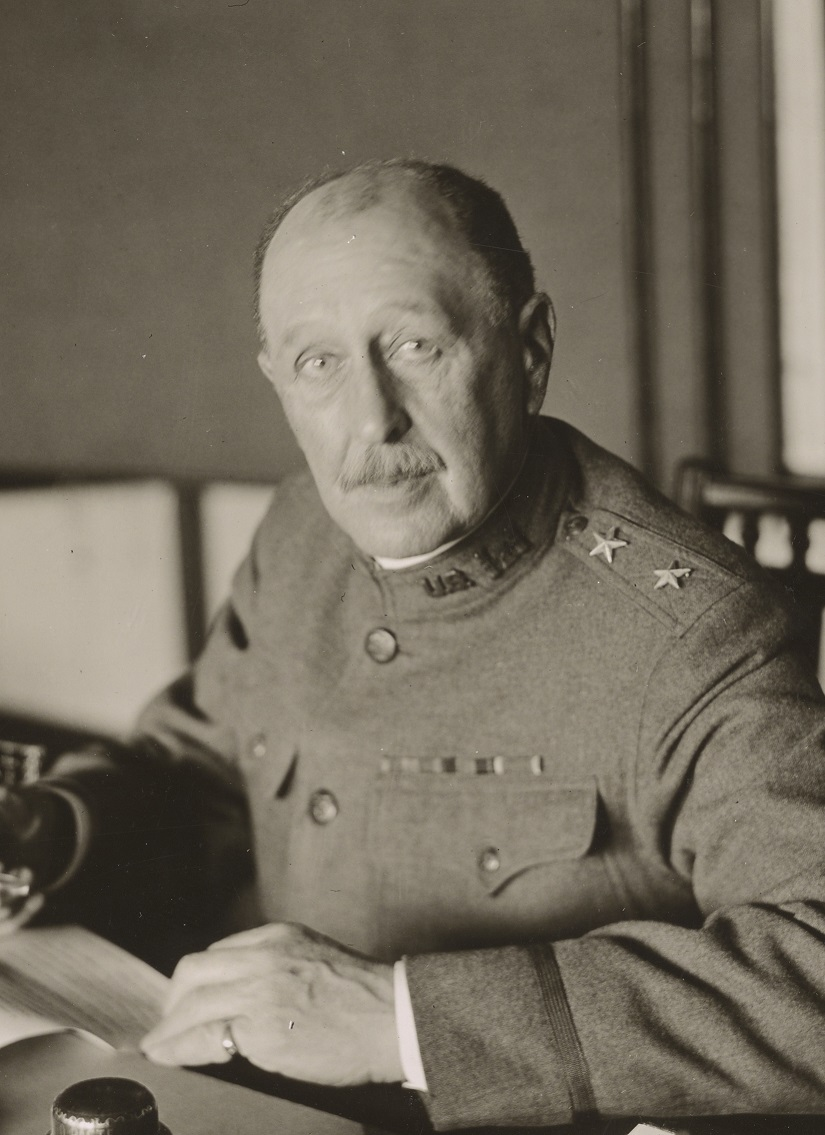
- Black in April 1918
- Born: December 8, 1855; Lancaster, Pennsylvania, U.S.
- Died: September 24, 1933 (aged 77); Washington, D.C., U.S.
- Burial place: West Point Cemetery, West Point, New York, U.S.
- Military career
- Allegiance: United States
- Branch: United States Army
- Service years: 1877–1919
- Rank: Major General
- Service number: 0-12992
- Commands: Corps of Engineers
- Awards: Distinguished Service Medal

Engineer Commissioner of the District of Columbia
- In office March 2, 1897 – May 26, 1898
- Preceded by: Charles Frances Powell
- Succeeded by: Lansing Hoskins Beach

William Murray Black (December 8, 1855 – September 24, 1933) was a career officer in the United States Army, noted for his ability to organize and train young engineers.

== Biography ==
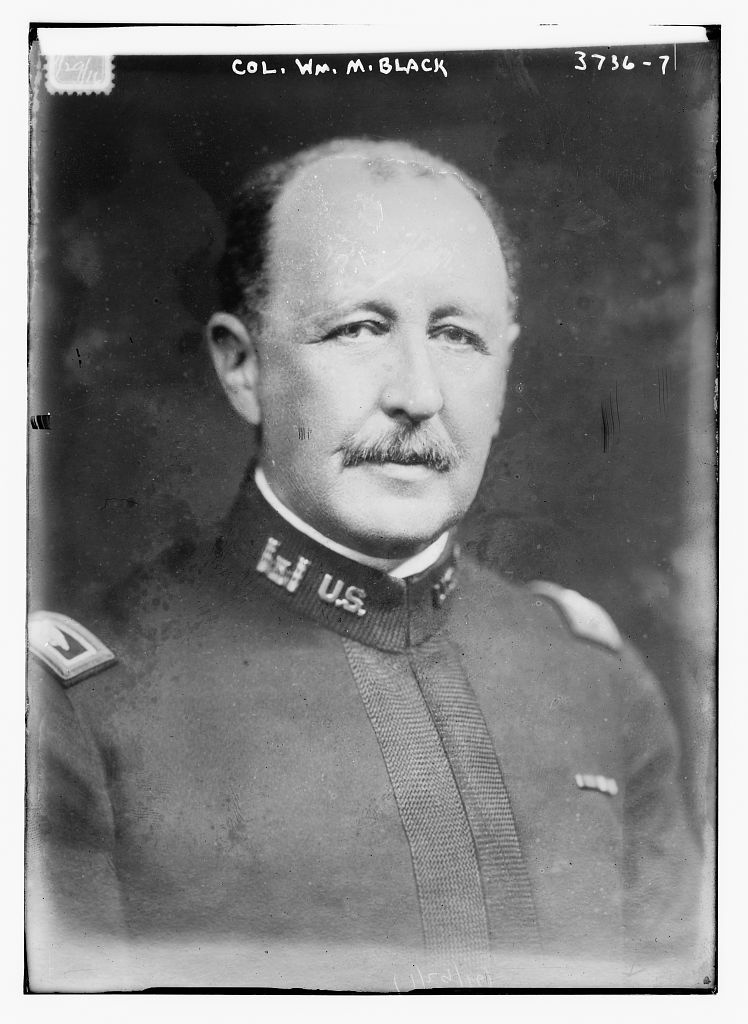
Official portrait, c. 1915

Black, born in Lancaster, Pennsylvania, graduated first in the United States Military Academy class of 1877 and was commissioned in the Corps of Engineers. From 1886 to 1891 Black headed the Jacksonville District, and in 1897-98 he was the Engineer Commissioner on the governing board of the District of Columbia. In the Spanish–American War, he was Chief Engineer, 3d and 5th Army Corps. As Chief Engineer under Generals William Ludlow and Leonard Wood (1899–1901), and six years later as advisor to the Cuban Department of Public Works, he modernized Havana's sanitary system. As commandant of the Army Engineer School (1901–03), Black moved it from the Fort at Willets Point, New York to Washington Barracks, D.C. After his return from Cuba in 1909, he was Northeast Division Engineer and chairman of a board to raise the battleship USS Maine.

Devoted to training young engineer officers in the art of war, General Black's greatest responsibility came as Chief of Engineers during World War I in mobilizing and training some 300,000 engineer troops for a wide range of military engineering tasks. For this work he was awarded the Army Distinguished Service Medal, the citation for which reads:

The President of the United States of America, authorized by Act of Congress, July 9, 1918, takes pleasure in presenting the Army Distinguished Service Medal to Major General William Murray Black, United States Army, for exceptionally meritorious and distinguished services to the Government of the United States, in a duty of great responsibility as Chief of Engineers, in planning and administering the engineer and military railway services during World War I.

He retired October 31, 1919, and died in Washington, D.C., on September 24, 1933. He is buried at West Point Cemetery.

== Honors ==
The USS General W. M. Black (AP-135), launched July 1943, was named in his honor as was the dustpan dredge William M. Black.

== Notes ==
This article contains public domain text from "Major General William Murray Black". Portraits and Profiles of Chief Engineers. Archived from the original on March 6, 2005.

== Bibliography ==
- Davis, Henry Blaine Jr. (1998). Generals in Khaki. Raleigh, North Carolina: Pentland Press, Inc. pp. 38–39. ISBN 1-57197-088-6.

Military offices
Preceded by Dan Christie Kingman	Chief of Engineers; 1916–1919	Succeeded by Lansing Hoskins Beach
