= USS General W. M. Black =

Transport ship

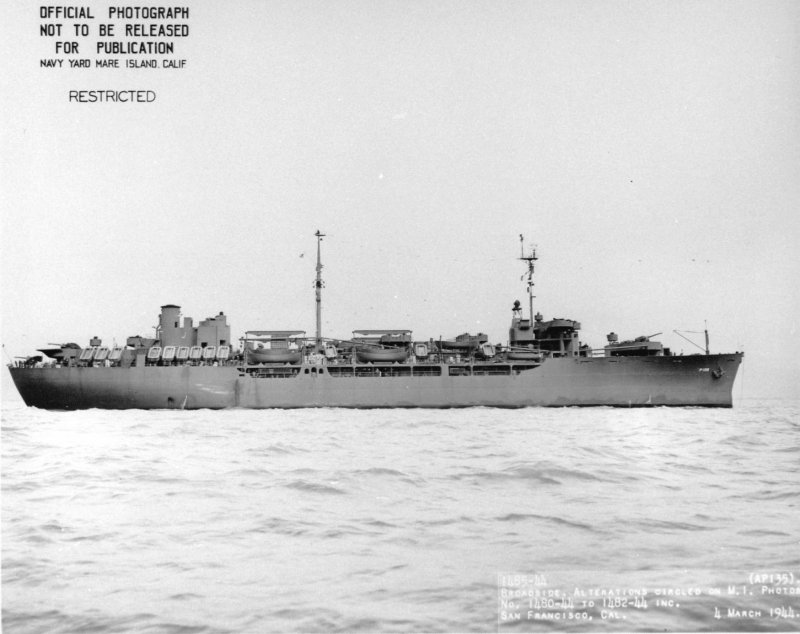
- USS General W. M. Black (AP-134)

History

United States
- Name: General W. M. Black
- Namesake: William Murray Black
- Builder: Kaiser Co., Inc.; Richmond, California
- Laid down: 26 November 1942
- Launched: 23 July 1943
- Acquired: 26 January 1944
- Commissioned: 24 February 1944
- Decommissioned: 28 February 1946
- In service: after 28 February 1946 (Army); 1 March 1950 (MSTS)
- Out of service: 1 March 1950 (Army); 26 August 1955 (MSTS)
- Renamed: SS Green Forest
- Reclassified: T-AP-135, 1 March 1950
- Identification: IMO number: 6801171
- Fate: Scrapped 1980

General characteristics
- Class & type: General G. O. Squier-class transport ship
- Displacement: 9,950 tons (light), 17,250 tons (full)
- Length: 522 ft 10 in (159.36 m)
- Beam: 71 ft 6 in (21.79 m)
- Draft: 26 ft 6 in (8.08 m)
- Propulsion: single-screw steam turbine with 9,900 shp (7,400 kW)
- Speed: 17 knots (31 km/h)
- Capacity: 3,823 troops
- Complement: 512 (officers and enlisted)
- Armament: 4 × 5"/38 caliber guns; 8 × 1.1"/75 AA guns; 16 × 20 mm Oerlikon AA guns

USS General W. M. Black (AP-135) was a General G. O. Squier-class transport ship for the U.S. Navy in World War II. The ship was crewed by the U.S. Coast Guard until decommissioning. She was named in honor of U.S. Army general William Murray Black. She was transferred to the U.S. Army as USAT General W. M. Black in 1946. On 1 March 1950 she was transferred to the Military Sea Transportation Service (MSTS) as USNS General W. M. Black (T-AP-135). She was later sold for commercial operation under the name SS Green Forest, before being scrapped in 1980.

== Operational history ==
General W. M. Black (AP-135) was laid down under a Maritime Commission contract (MC #658) 26 November 1942 by Kaiser Co., Inc., Yard 3, Richmond, California; launched 23 July 1943; sponsored by Mrs. Decatur S. Higgins; acquired by the Navy 26 January 1944; converted to a transport by Matson Navigation Co., San Francisco; and commissioned 24 February 1944.

One of the most active ships of her type, General W. M. Black plied the world's oceans and touched many distant ports in completing her varied missions as a troopship. On her first voyage she embarked 3,500 Army troops and sailed from San Francisco 26 March 1944, delivering them at Pearl Harbor before returning to San Francisco 9 April with nearly 500 veterans. Underway again 22 April, General W. M. Black carried 3,500 troops from San Francisco to New Caledonia and Guadalcanal. She departed Guadalcanal 14 May, embarked 2,700 at Balboa, Canal Zone, and reached New Orleans 8 June. The transport subsequently steamed to Kingston, Jamaica, where she embarked 2,400 passengers and sailed to Norfolk, arriving 26 June.

General W. M. Black began the first of 13 transatlantic, round-trip voyages when she departed Norfolk 28 July with 2,700 fighting men bound for Naples, and returned to New York 31 August with 3,000 homeward-bound troops and casualties. From 12 September to 19 August 1945 the busy transport made 10 similar round-trip troop-carrying voyages (5 from New York, 3 from Boston, and 2 from Norfolk) to the United Kingdom (Plymouth, Liverpool, Southampton); France (Cherbourg, Le Havre, Marseilles); North Africa (Oran); and Germany (Bremerhaven). In addition to carrying German prisoners of war to the United States, she rotated tens of thousands of troops and patients to and from the European theater in this period of nearly a year. Departing Boston 31 August 1945, General W. M. Black sailed for India via the Suez Canal. A unit of the "Magic-Carpet" fleet, she returned to Boston in October with 3,000 veterans of the South Pacific fighting. After making a similar voyage during November and December, she moored at New York 5 January 1946. She decommissioned there 28 February 1946 and was returned to service as an Army transport.

On 16 February 1948, General W. M. Black arrived first in Puerto Cabello, Venezuela, carrying 1,500 Italians, Hungarians, Croats, etc. and after, in Peru, on 24 February 1948, carrying 626 Croats from a refugee camp in Italy, Camp Fermo. On 2 March 1948, General W. M. Black left Bremerhaven, with 860 displaced persons from Europe and arrived in Melbourne, on 27 April 1948. This voyage was one of almost 150 voyages by some 40 ships bringing refugees of World War II to Australia. General W. M. Black made three more such trips herself. On 30 September 1948, she arrived in Ilha das Flores, Rio de Janeiro, Brazil, with Eastern European refugees, many of whom had been in (Villach/St. Maarten) Austrian DP camps (Ukrainians, Polish, etc.) On 21 October 1948 she set sail from Bremerhaven, Germany and arrived in New York on 30 October 1948. sailing out of Bremerhaven, sometime in September. There are records of the USS General W. M. Black arriving in Buenos Aires, Argentina from Genoa, Italy on Jan 24th, 1949, with displaced persons and refugees (Austrian DP camps (Ukrainians, Polish, etc.) The USS General W. M. Black departed Bremerhaven Germany with several hundred Displaced Persons aboard, arriving in Halifax, Nova Scotia Canada on 16 March 1949....her 9th voyage. She departed Naples, on 29 May 1949, arriving 25 June 1949, in Melbourne. with 826 more displaced persons. The USS General W. M. Black made 3 voyages from Bremerhaven to Pier 21 in Halifax Canada, transporting Displaced persons (Jewish Poles) 700 persons arriving on 15 June 1948, an unknown number arriving on 16 March 1949 and 822 persons arriving on 12 August 1949 (Reference Pier 21 ship arrival records https://pier21.ca/research/immigration-records)

On 16 November 1949, she again departed Naples, with 1,314 refugees, this time arriving in Sydney, on 13 December 1949. General W. M. Black made a fourth run to Australia, arriving in Melbourne, again, with 1,316 refugees on 13 April 1950. On 25 April 1950, General W. M. Black picked up repatriating Dutch soldiers from Java, arriving in Rotterdam on 18 May 1950.

General W. M. Black was reacquired by the Navy 1 March 1950, and assigned to MSTS. Crewed by civilians, she operated out of New York in the Atlantic until 1 September, when she shifted her homeport to San Francisco. Between 1950 and 1953, she steamed to the Far East and transported more than 65,000 troops and their combat equipment in support of the Korean War. After the Korean armistice, she continued transpacific voyages, deploying troops to Japan, Korea, and Alaska and returning veterans of the Korean fighting to the United States. In June 1955, she carried troops and cargo to the Bering Sea during Operation "Mona Lisa". Following her return to San Francisco, she was placed out of service 26 August, and was transferred back to the Maritime Administration. She was then berthed in the National Defense Reserve Fleet at Suisun Bay, California.

There she remained until 1967, (some sources say 1965) when she was purchased by Central Gulf Steamship Co. of New Orleans. She was renamed Green Forest, USCG ON 508061, IMO 6801171, after being rebuilt as a 10,577-ton cargo ship. Green Forest was scrapped at Taiwan in 1980.

General W. M. Black received six battle stars for Korean War service.

== Sources ==
- Williams, Greg H. (2013). World War II U.S. Navy Vessels in Private Hands. McFarland Books. ISBN 978-0-7864-6645-0.
