= Edward Alexander Millar =

United States Army general

Edward Millar
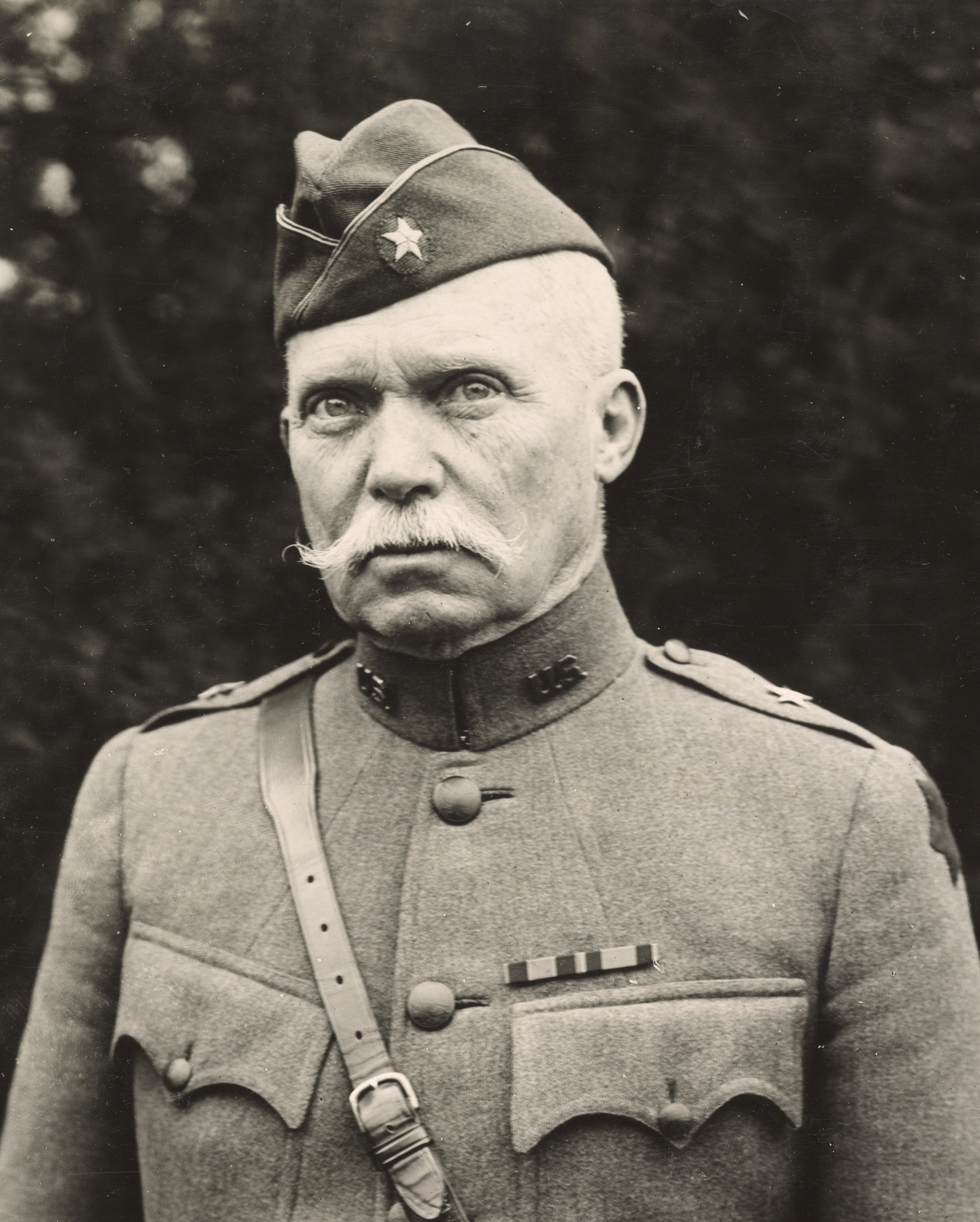
- Brig. Gen. Edward Millar in January 1919 in France
- Born: June 25, 1860; Louisville, Kentucky, US
- Died: January 31, 1934 (aged 73); Coronado, California, US
- Burial place: Greenwood Memorial Park, San Diego, California
- Military career
- Allegiance: United States
- Branch: United States Army
- Service years: 1882–1920
- Rank: Brigadier general
- Service number: 0-13433
- Commands: 6th Field Artillery Brigade 58th Field Artillery Brigade
- Conflicts: Spanish–American War; World War I • Meuse-Argonne Offensive

Edward Alexander Millar (June 25, 1860 – January 31, 1934) was a United States Army officer whose career included service in the Spanish–American War and World War I. He attained the rank of brigadier general, and was notable for his World War I command of the 5th and 58th Field Artillery Brigades.

== Early life ==
Edward Alexander Millar was born in Louisville, Kentucky on June 25, 1860. In 1882, Millar graduated number fourteen of thirty-seven at the USMA. Notable classmates were Adelbert Cronkhite and Henry T. Allen. After graduating, he was commissioned in the 3rd Artillery Regiment and in 1886 he graduated from the Artillery School.

== Military career ==
Millar was an assistant instructor in engineering and artillery at the Artillery School at Fort Monroe, Virginia from 1891 to 1896. In 1909, he graduated from the Army War College. He was an aid to General Edward B. Williston then served during the Philippine Insurrection in the Spanish–American War. Millar was promoted to colonel of Field Artillery on December 1, 1911. On June 13, 1913, Millar transferred to the 6th Field Artillery. Millar became a brigadier general of the National Army on December 17, 1917. As a brigadier general, Millar commanded 5th Field Artillery Brigade, 5th Division. In the Meuse-Argonne Offensive he temporarily commanded the 58th Field Artillery Brigade.

In 1920, Millar retired due to physical disabilities, holding the rank of colonel in the Army and brigadier general in the National Army. In 1930, Congress passed a law allowing the general officers of World War I to retire at the highest rank they had held, and he was promoted to brigadier general on the retired list.

== Personal life ==
On January 31, 1934, Millar died in Coronado, California. He was buried at Greenwood Memorial Park in San Diego.
