= Edward Burr =

United States Army general

Brigadier General Edward Burr
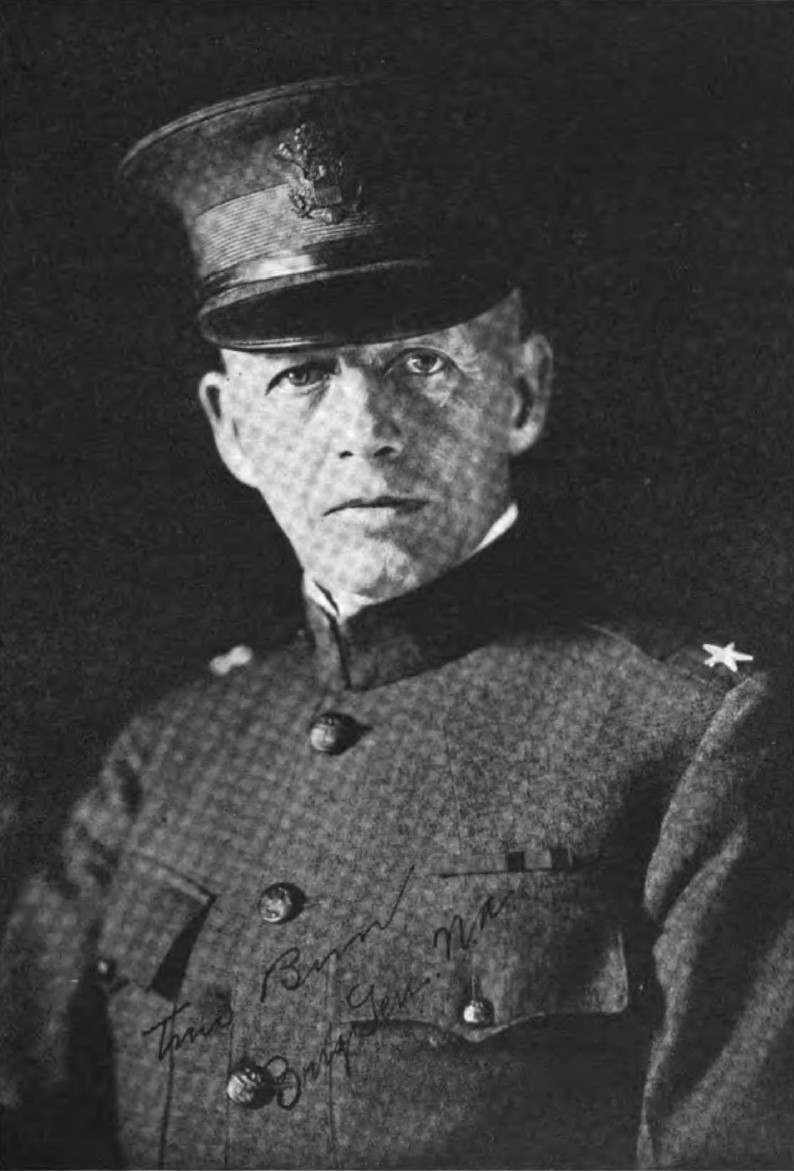
- Born: May 19, 1859; Booneville, Missouri, US
- Died: April 15, 1952 (aged 92); Washington, D.C., US
- Burial place: Arlington National Cemetery
- Military career
- Branch: United States Army
- Service years: 1882–1923
- Rank: Brigadier General
- Commands: 62nd Field Artillery Brigade; 166th Field Artillery Brigade; 4th Regiment of Engineers; 2nd Battalion of Engineers; 3rd Battalion of Engineers; U.S. Army Engineer School; Battalion of Engineers, Fifth Army Corps; E Company, Battalion of Engineers
- Conflicts: Spanish–American War; World War I

Edward Burr (May 19, 1859 - April 15, 1952) was an American general and engineer in the United States Army who served in the Spanish–American War and World War I. He is best known for his service to the Army Corps of Engineers.

== Early life ==
Burr was born on May 19, 1859, to William E. Burr and Harriet Brand Burr in Booneville, Missouri. His family moved to St. Louis when he was one year old so that his father could become president of the Bank of St. Louis. Burr attended primary school in the suburb of Kirkwood, and in September 1874 enrolled in Washington University, where he studied mining engineering. Burr left the university in December 1877 and after receiving approval from Missouri Congressman Nathan Cole, enrolled in the United States Military Academy on July 1, 1878. He graduated at the top of the class of 1882, alongside Adelbert Cronkhite and Henry Tureman Allen. Written above his portrait in the class yearbook was the name of Aaron Burr, third vice-president of the United States and his third cousin, three times removed.

== Military career ==
After graduating from the academy, Burr was commissioned as a second lieutenant in the United States Army Corps of Engineers. He was assigned to the engineer battalion at Willets Point, New York from September 1882 to October 1884, receiving a promotion to first lieutenant in April 1883. In June 1884, Burr married Katherine Green, the daughter of a prominent Portland, Oregon industrialist. Two months later he was transferred to Portland, where he remained until 1891. During his time in Portland, Burr supervised the construction of the Cascade Locks and had two sons, William Edward and John Green. Both went on to graduate from the USMA class of 1914. In 1891, Burr returned to the east for a new assignment at Norfolk, Virginia, where he worked on improvements to the Albemarle and Chesapeake Canal. He was promoted to captain in September 1894, and was transferred to Washington, D.C. two months later. Burr was Assistant to the Engineer Commissioner of the District of Columbia for four years, during which time he made improvements to the capitol's water system, organized the planting of trees, and supervised construction of the Georgetown Reservoir.

After the outbreak of the Spanish–American War, Burr was appointed a lieutenant colonel in the U.S. Volunteers and given command of the Fifth Army Corps Battalion of Engineers. He was in charge of the beaches during the American landing at Daiquiri, and participated in the campaign against Santiago de Cuba. After the war ended, Burr was mustered out of his unit and reverted to his regular rank of captain. He went on to serve several different assignments with the Corps of Engineers in New York, Pennsylvania, Georgia, Missouri, and Washington, D.C., and was promoted to major in January 1903. From April 1903 to June 1906, Burr served as commandant of the Army Engineer School.

From 1910 to 1914, Burr was Assistant Chief of Engineers in Washington, and received a promotion to colonel on March 2, 1912. Soon after, he transferred to the Philippines to become Department Engineer of the Philippine Department, a position that made him responsible for the construction of fortifications throughout the country.

Burr was promoted to brigadier general in August 1917 and given command of the newly organized 91st Division's 166th Field Artillery Brigade. He traveled to France with the brigade in June 1917 and was stationed at the Clermont Ferrand Puy de Dome Artillery Training Center until August 21, 1918, when he was relieved of command and transferred to the 37th Division's 62nd Field Artillery Brigade. He led the brigade during the Meuse–Argonne offensive and was relieved of command on January 29, 1919. Burr reverted to his regular rank of colonel after the war was over, and returned to the United States in February 1919. He served in New York for a short time, and retired from military service on May 19, 1923, having reached the mandatory retirement age of 64.

== Death and legacy ==
After his military retirement, Burr was a consulting engineer in New York until November 1928, during which time he constructed an anti-erosion jetty at Long Island's Rockaway Beach and supervised the construction of the Pilgrim Monument at Provincetown, Massachusetts. In 1928, Burr moved to Washington, D.C., where he lived until his death at Walter Reed Hospital on April 15, 1952. He had been advanced to brigadier general on the Army retired list in June 1930. Burr was buried in Arlington National Cemetery.

== Bibliography ==
- Davis, Henry Blaine Jr. (1998). Generals in Khaki. Raleigh, North Carolina: Pentland Press, Inc. p. 60. ISBN 1-57197-088-6.
