= Richard W. Young =

US Army general (1858-1919)

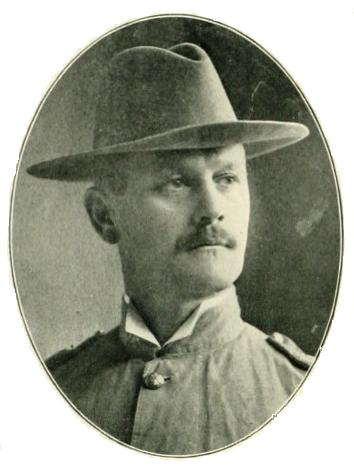
- Major Richard W. Young; Utah Light Artillery
- Born: April 19, 1858; Salt Lake City, Utah, US
- Died: December 27, 1919 (aged 61); Salt Lake City, Utah, US
- Burial place: Salt Lake City Cemetery
- Relatives: Brigham Young (grandfather)
- Military career
- Allegiance: United States
- Branch: United States Army; Utah National Guard
- Service years: 1882–1889, 1898–1899, 1917–1919 (Army); 1895–1896 (National Guard)
- Rank: Brigadier General
- Commands: 65th Field Artillery Brigade
- Conflicts: Philippine–American War; World War I
- Other work: attorney

Richard Whitehead Young (April 19, 1858 – December 27, 1919) was a U.S. Army brigadier general and an associate justice of the Supreme Court of the Philippines during the time that the Philippines was a U.S. Territory.

== Early life ==
Young was born in Salt Lake City in 1858, to Joseph A. Young and his second (plural) wife, Margaret Whitehead. Joseph Young was the son of Brigham Young and his wife, Mary Ann Angell.

Young was raised for the first few years of his life in Salt Lake City: in the Beehive House, the adjoining Lion House, and in a house his parents owned on what is now the site of the Joseph Smith Memorial Building. As a teenager he studied at the University of Deseret. He was then a teacher and principal in Manti, Utah and worked for the office of the architect of the Church of Jesus Christ of Latter-day Saints (LDS Church). As a youth, Young was very good friends with Heber J. Grant who praised him as the most honest man he had ever known.

For a time as a youth Young hoped to get his grandfather, Brigham Young, to fund his study of architecture at a university in the eastern United States. As a member of the LDS Church, he hoped in this way to be instrumental in building many of the church's temples.

== Military and legal career ==
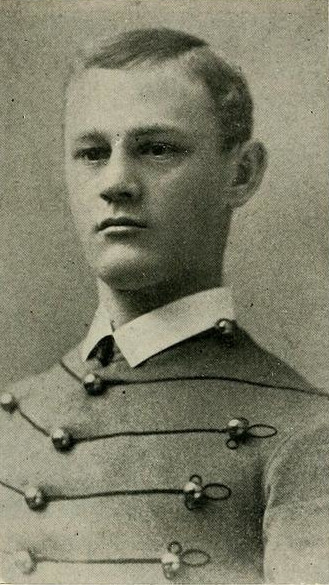
Cadet Young at West Point

Young entered West Point in 1878, graduated 15th in the Class of 1882 and was commissioned in the field artillery as a 2nd lieutenant. He briefly returned to Utah where his marriage to Minerva Richards was performed by Joseph F. Smith. They then went to New York City where Young was stationed at Fort Columbus on Governor's Island.

While at Fort Columbus, Young was able to attend Columbia Law School, graduating with honors in 1884. He was promoted to the rank of captain and named to the staff of General Winfield Scott Hancock, working as a military attorney for the next few years. In 1888, Young was able to exchange places with another officer detailed to Fort Douglas, near Salt Lake City, in order to be closer to home. He then started his own private law practice and officially resigned his army commission in 1889.

Young briefly served in the Utah National Guard from 1895 to 1896, and reentered the Army during the Spanish–American War, leading the Utah Light Artillery Battalion in the Philippines. When the war ended, he was appointed as an associate justice of the U.S. Territory of the Philippines Supreme Court. He returned to private legal practice in 1901, acting as attorney for the Idaho Sugar Company (later becoming the Utah-Idaho Sugar Company).

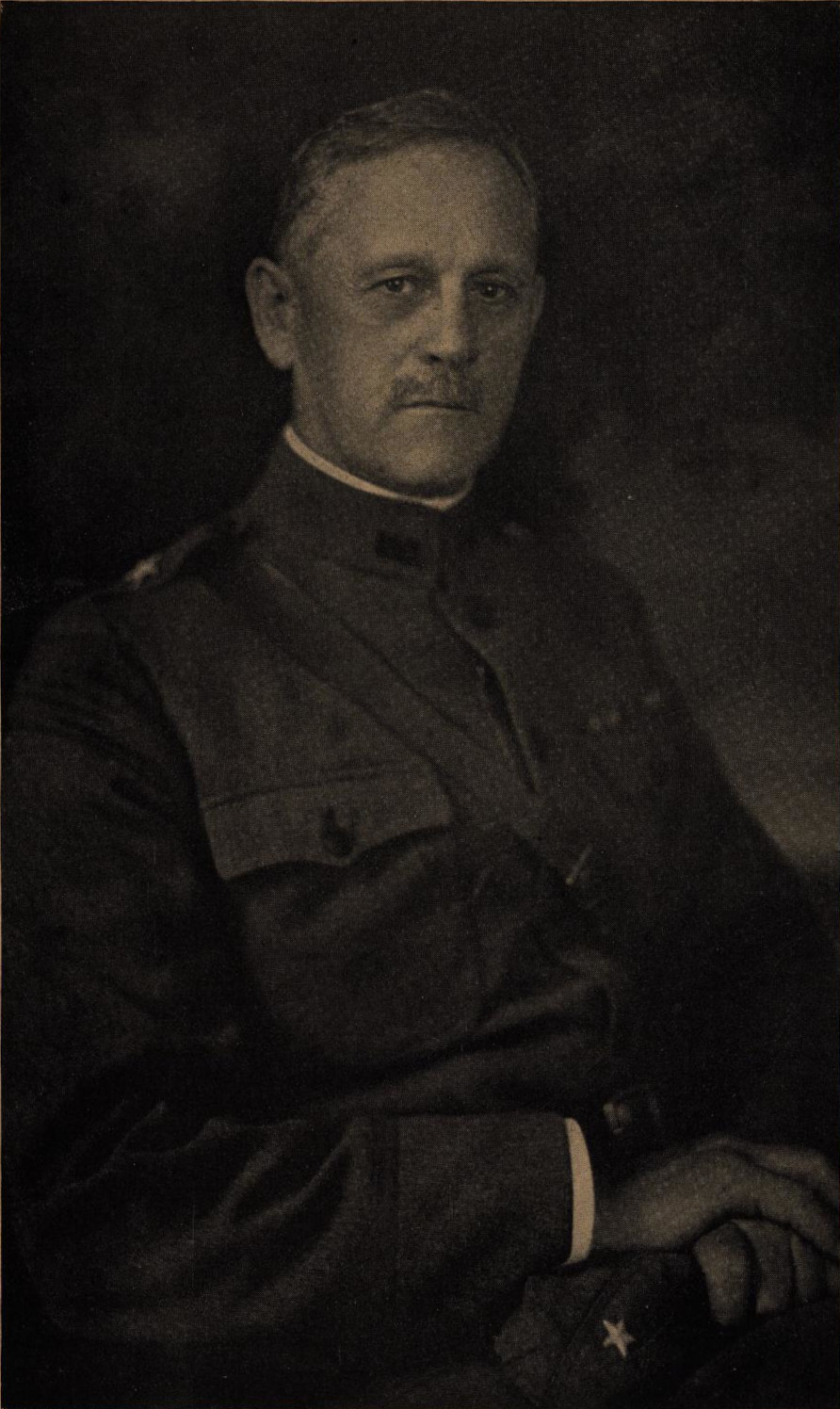
Young in his brigadier-general uniform

In 1917, Young was commissioned as colonel and commanded the 145th Field Artillery Regiment. He was promoted to brigadier general in 1918, and commanded the 65th Field Artillery Brigade, 40th Division, France. He died of appendicitis in 1919, and was buried at Salt Lake City Cemetery.

== Family ==
Young married Minerva Richards, the daughter of Henry Phinehas Richards and Margaret Minerva Amanda Empey. Henry Richards was a son of Phinehas Richards and his wife, Wealthy Dewey, and thus a brother of Franklin D. Richards. Richard and Minerva were third cousins, since they both descended from Phineas Howe and Susannah Goddard.

Young's daughter Minerva was the wife of Adam S. Bennion.
