= Benjamin Alvord Jr. =

United States Army general (1860–1927)

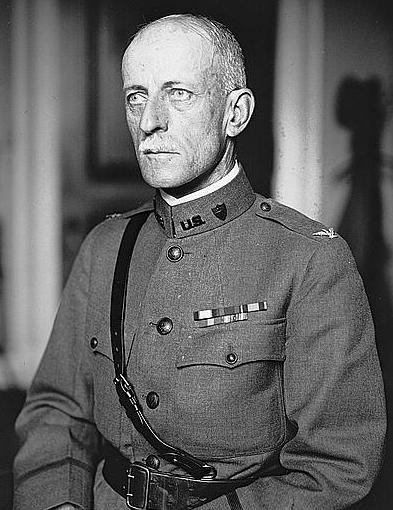
- Alvord in 1922
- Born: May 15, 1860; Vancouver, Washington, US
- Died: April 13, 1927 (aged 66); Washington, D.C., US
- Burial place: Arlington National Cemetery
- Relatives: Benjamin Alvord (father)
- Military career
- Allegiance: United States
- Branch: United States Army
- Service years: 1882–1924
- Rank: Brigadier General
- Conflicts: World War I
- Awards: Army Distinguished Service Medal; Silver Citation Star

Benjamin Alvord Jr. (May 15, 1860 – April 13, 1927) was an American officer. He was the son of Benjamin Alvord, who was a scientist and an officer.

== Early life and career ==
Alvord was born in Vancouver, Washington, and graduated number seventeen of thirty-seven from the United States Military Academy in 1882. He was assigned to the 20th Infantry Regiment. He attended the Infantry and Cavalry School at Fort Leavenworth.

Alvord was an instructor at West Point and at the Infantry and Cavalry School. He served in the Philippines as a major in ordnance and as an adjutant. He served as adjutant general of the Department of Luzon. He was awarded the Silver Citation Star for his service.

Alvord was promoted to brigadier general and in May 1917 was the adjutant general of the American Expeditionary Forces during World War I. He was awarded the Distinguished Service Medal for his service during the war. He left Europe in 1918 due to illness. He subsequently was named Assistant Adjutant General of the Army in 1922. He served in this post until his retirement in 1924.

== Death and legacy ==
Alvord died on April 13, 1927. He was buried at Arlington National Cemetery, in Arlington, Virginia.

== Family ==
Alvord was married to Margaret McCleery, the daughter of Army chaplain J. B. McCleery. Margaret's sister Kate was the wife of Major General John Frank Morrison.

== Awards ==
- Distinguished Service Medal
- Silver Citation Star
