= Thomas Buchanan Dugan =

United States Army general

Thomas Dugan
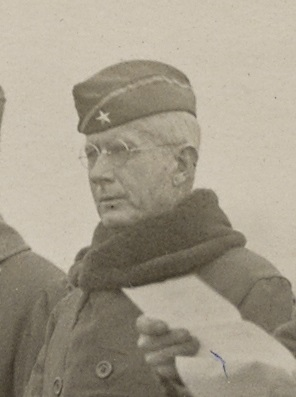
- Brigadier General Thomas Dugan near Dagonville 1918
- Born: July 27, 1858; Baltimore, Maryland
- Died: April 27, 1940 (aged 81); Washington, D.C.
- Spouse: Geraldine Wessels
- Children: 3
- Military career
- Allegiance: United States
- Branch: United States Army
- Service years: 1882–1922
- Rank: Brigadier general
- Service number: 0-130
- Conflicts: Spanish–American War; World War I • Meuse-Argonne Offensive
- Awards: Silver Star; Distinguished Service Medal

Thomas Buchanan Dugan (July 27, 1858 – April 27, 1940) was a United States Army officer in the late 19th and early 20th centuries.

== Biography ==
Dugan was born in Baltimore on July 27, 1858. He graduated from the United States Military Academy in 1882 and was commissioned in the Tenth Cavalry.

Dugan served on the American frontier from 1882 to 1890, and he commanded a company of Apache Indian scouts from 1884 to 1885. Until 1898, Dugan served at several locations, including in Arizona, New Mexico, Texas, Oklahoma, and Missouri. He served in the Spanish–American War, taking part in the Siege of Santiago and the Battle of San Juan Hill, and he received a Silver Star for his role in the former battle. Dugan also served in the Sanitary Corps for a short time. Afterward, he took two tours of service to the Philippines, in 1905 and 1916.

Dugan was promoted to the rank of brigadier general in the National Army on August 5, 1917, and between December 1917 and May 1918, he managed a brigade and field officers' school. During World War I, he served in Europe from July 1918 to July 1919, and he commanded brigades in the 86th, 85th, 53rd, and 5th infantry divisions. Dugan commanded the 35th Infantry Division from November 25 to December 1918, and again from December 27, 1918, to the division's deactivation in April 1919. Dugan participated in the Meuse-Argonne Offensive, and he received the Distinguished Service Medal for his role in the offensive. He retired on July 27, 1922, at the rank of colonel.

Congress restored Dugan's brigadier general rank on February 28, 1927. He died on April 27, 1940, in Washington, D.C.

== Personal life ==
On November 24, 1897, Dugan married Geraldine Wessels, the daughter of Henry W. Wessells. They had three children. Dugan was a Roman Catholic.

== Bibliography ==
- Davis, Henry Blaine Jr. (1998). Generals in Khaki. Raleigh, North Carolina: Pentland Press. ISBN 1571970886. OCLC 40298151.
- Marquis Who's Who (1975). Who Was Who In American History – The Military. Chicago, Illinois: Marquis Who's Who. ISBN 0837932017.
- Rudd, Herbert Finley (2017). The Official History of the Fifth Division, U. S. A.: During the Period of Its Organization and of Its Operations in the European World War, 1917-1919. The Red Diamond (Meuse) Division. Forgotten Books. ISBN 978-1331115298.
