= Adelbert Cronkhite =

United States Army officer (1861–1937)

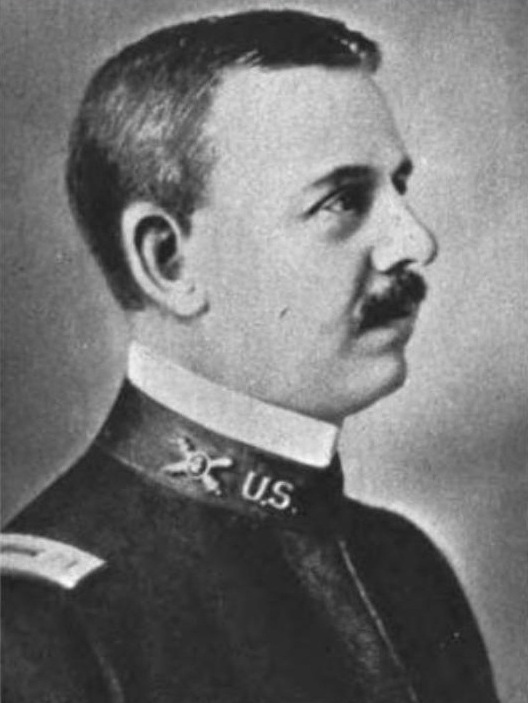
- Cronkhite as depicted in the October 1918 edition of Munsey's Magazine.
- Born: January 6, 1861; Litchfield, New York
- Died: June 15, 1937 (aged 76); St. Petersburg, Florida
- Burial place: West Point Cemetery
- Relatives: Alexander Cummings McWhorter Pennington Jr. (father in law)
- Military career
- Allegiance: United States
- Branch: United States Army
- Service years: 1882–1923
- Rank: Major General
- Unit: United States Army Coast Artillery Corps
- Commands: 22nd Field Artillery Battery; Fort Totten, New York; Panama Coast Artillery District; 80th Division; IX Corps; VI Corps; Newport News Port of Debarkation; Coast Artillery Training Center; Third Corps Area
- Conflicts: Sioux Wars; Spanish–American War; World War I
- Awards: Distinguished Service Medal; French Croix de Guerre; French Legion of Honor; British Order of St Michael and St George; Virginia Distinguished Service Medal

Adelbert Cronkhite (January 6, 1861 – June 15, 1937) was a career officer in the United States Army. He was notable for his command of the 80th Division during World War I. He also served as interim commander of IX Corps and commander of VI Corps after the war. In addition, his later command assignments included the Newport News Port of Debarkation, the Coast Artillery Training Center, and Third Corps Area.

Cronkhite was the subject of national attention in the early 1920s when he advocated publicly for the investigation into the death of his son to be reopened; Alexander P. Cronkhite was an Army major stationed at Camp Lewis, Washington, in 1918 when he died as the result of a gunshot. An investigation determined that the wound was accidental and self-inflicted; Cronkhite's public campaign led to the indictment of two soldiers who had been with Alexander Cronkhite at the time of his death. The 1924 trial of one ended in an acquittal, and charges against the second were dropped. Cronkhite's public campaign to renew the investigation brought him into disfavor with senior Army leadership, and he was retired against his wishes in 1923.

After his retirement, Cronkhite lived in the Pittsburgh, Pennsylvania area and became active in veterans' groups. He was also a frequent speaker at military reunions and other public events.

Cronkhite died in Florida in 1937 and was buried at West Point Cemetery.

== Early life ==
Adelbert Cronkhite was born in Litchfield, New York, on January 6, 1861. His father was a surgeon in the Army, and Cronkhite was raised at military posts throughout the United States. He was appointed from Arizona to the United States Military Academy (USMA) at West Point, New York, in 1878; he graduated in 1882 ranked 10th in his class, and was assigned to the Field Artillery Branch.

== Start of career ==
Cronkhite was commissioned as a second lieutenant in the 4th Artillery Regiment and assigned to the garrison at Fort Warren, Massachusetts. He then attended the Artillery School at Fort Monroe, Virginia; after graduating, he remained on the faculty until 1888.

In July 1888, Cronkhite was assigned to the garrison at Fort Trumbull, Connecticut. From May to October 1889 he served at Fort McPherson, Georgia, and he was assigned to Fort Barrancas, Florida, until July 1890. Cronkhite was promoted to first lieutenant in the 4th Artillery in January 1889.

From 1890 to 1891 Cronkhite served at Fort Riley, Kansas. From January to August 1891, he served in South Dakota during operations against Native Americans at the end of the Sioux Wars. He was Professor of Military Science at the Michigan Military Academy from 1891 to 1892. Cronkhite then returned to Fort McPherson, where he performed garrison duty until May 1893. He served at Fort McHenry, Maryland, from 1893 to 1896, and then returned to Fort Riley, where he served until 1898.

== Spanish–American War ==
During the Spanish–American War, Cronkhite organized and trained units intended for combat overseas, serving at Jackson Barracks, Louisiana; Camp Thomas, Georgia; and Tampa, Florida. He served in Puerto Rico with the 4th Artillery during the second half of 1898, and took part in the Battle of Coamo. He returned to the United States for demobilization in Savannah, Georgia, before traveling to his regiment's home base at Fort Riley. Cronkhite was promoted to captain in March 1899.

== Post-Spanish–American War ==
After taking an extended post-war leave, Cronkhite performed garrison duty at Fort Terry, New York. From June 1899 to September 1901 he was assigned as adjutant of the School of Submarine Defense at Fort Totten, New York. (The School of Submarine Defense taught the use of torpedoes and naval mines for protecting harbors.) When the Artillery Corps was divided into Field Artillery and Coast Artillery, Cronkhite opted to serve with the Coast Artillery.

From September 1901 to May 1904, Cronkhite was assigned to Fort Douglas, Utah, as commander of the 22nd Field Artillery Battery. He then performed temporary duty as a quartermaster until July 1906. In November 1905, he received promotion to major.

Cronkhite performed extended duty on the staff of the Army's Department of the East from 1906 to 1911, including inspector general, artillery officer, and coast defense officer. He was promoted to lieutenant colonel in January 1909, and colonel in August 1911.

From September 1911 to October 1914, Cronkhite commanded the garrison at Fort Totten. He was then assigned to command the Panama Coast Artillery District—the coastal defenses of Panama and the Panama Canal Zone.

== World War I ==
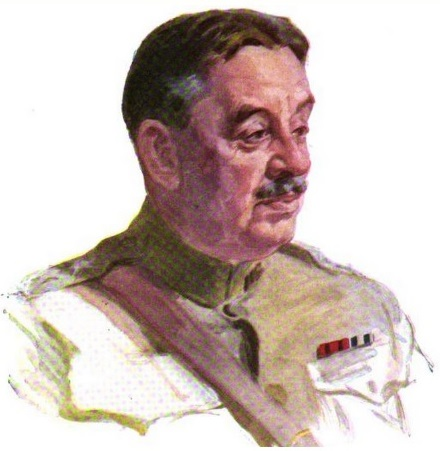
Cronkhite as commander of the 80th Division in World War I.

Cronkhite was promoted to brigadier general in May 1917, a month after the American entry into World War I, and temporary major general in August, and he remained in Panama until September.

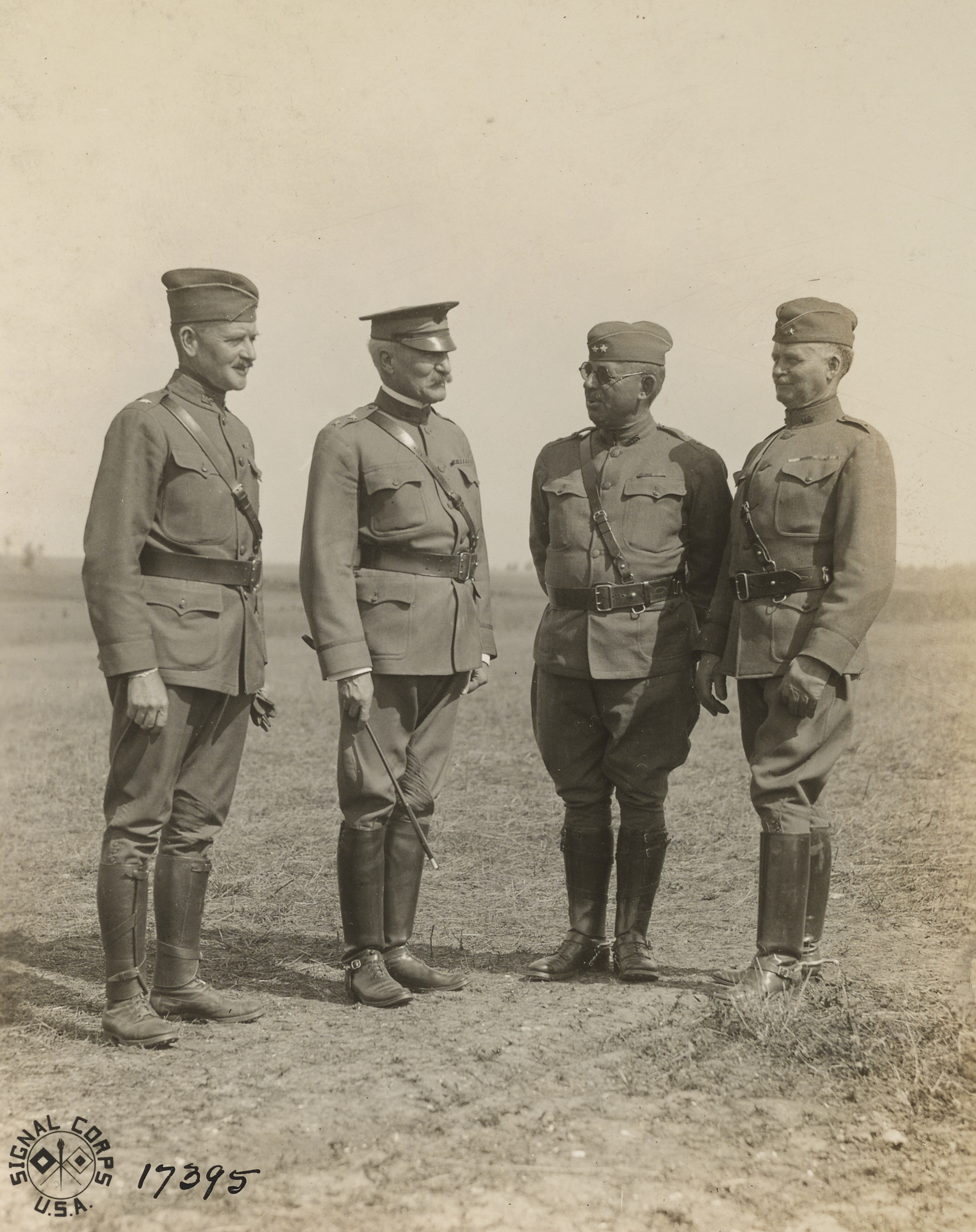
Officers at 80th Division Headquarters at Boque Maison, France, July 20, 1918. From left to right: Brigadier General George H. Jamerson, commander of the 159th Brigade, Major General George W. Read, commander of II Corps, Major General Adelbert Cronkhite, commanding the 80th Division, and Brigadier General Lloyd M. Brett, commanding the 160th Brigade.

The army expanded after U.S. entry into the war, increasing from 128,000 regular army troops and 164,000 members of the Army National Guard in April 1917 to nearly 3.9 million soldiers by November 1918. Cronkhite was appointed to command the 80th Division, an organization created with draftees from Virginia, West Virginia, Pennsylvania, Maryland, Delaware, and New Jersey. Like the other U.S. divisions fielded for World War I, the 80th was organized as a square division of two infantry brigades, the 159th and 160th. Each Infantry brigade was composed of two infantry regiments and a machine gun battalion. The division task organization also included an Artillery brigade and support units including Signal and Engineer battalions, a separate machine gun battalion, and a logistics trains. At approximately 28,000 soldiers, U.S. divisions were roughly twice the size of the divisions fielded by the other Allies.

Cronkhite organized and trained his new command at Camp Lee, Virginia, and led it to the Western Front in late May/early June 1918, where it formed part of the American Expeditionary Forces (AEF), commanded by General John J. Pershing. He remained in command during the division's 1918 combat operations, including the Second Battle of the Somme, the Battle of Saint-Mihiel, and finally in the Meuse–Argonne offensive, the largest battle in the history of the United States Army, where the 80th saw a significant amount of action.

The Armistice with Germany on November 11, 1918, brought hostilities to an end. Soon afterwards, Cronkhite took command of IX Corps, holding this command from November 1918 to January 1919, before commanding VI Corps from January to April 1919. He returned to command of the 80th Division in May so that he could lead it home to the United States for demobilization.

== Post-World War I ==
Cronkhite returned to the United States in May 1919, and commanded the Newport News Port of Debarkation until September. His temporary major general's commission ended on 15 September 1919, and his other post-war assignments included chief of officer classification for the Coast Artillery Corps, commander of the Coast Artillery Training Center at Fort Monroe and the coastal defenses of the Chesapeake Bay, and member of the Army's General Selection Board that determined which officers would be retained in the Army after the post-World War I demobilization was complete. In July 1920, he received a recess appointment as a major general. His recess appointment expired on 4 March 1921, but it was confirmed three days later.

In September 1920, Cronkhite was assigned to command Third Corps Area with headquarters at Fort Howard. From November 1920 to January 1921 Cronkhite served temporarily as military aide to Secretary of State Bainbridge Colby during Colby's extended mission in South America.

== Investigation into son's death ==
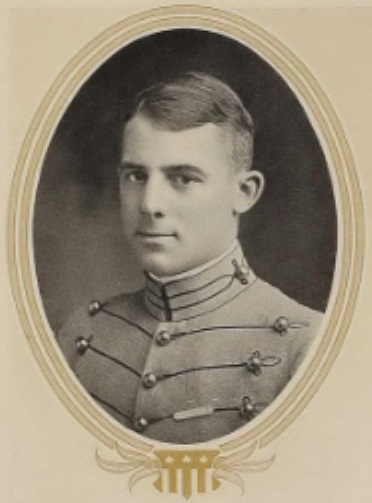
Alexander P. Cronkhite as a West Point senior in 1915.

Adelbert Cronkhite's son Alexander Pennington Cronkhite, nicknamed "Buddy", was a 1915 graduate of West Point. In October 1918, he was serving as a major commanding a battalion in a Camp Lewis, Washington engineer regiment. Major Cronkhite died of a gunshot wound while at a Camp Lewis training area; subsequent investigation determined that the wound was self-inflicted, and that it was accidental.

Some members of Alexander Cronkhite's regiment talked among themselves and raised the possibility of suicide. Others suggested that a sergeant who was with Cronkhite at the time of his death might have been the shooter.

Adelbert Cronkhite and his wife refused to accept the finding that the shooting was accidental. After hiring private detectives to re-interview witnesses and having a second autopsy performed, they were convinced that their son had been murdered. In Adelbert Cronkhite's view, the sergeant who was with his son on the day of the shooting (Roland Pothier) and the captain in temporary command of Alexander Cronkhite's troops at the time of the shooting (Robert Rosenbluth) were responsible. (Alexander Cronkhite was not in command on the day of his death because he was recovering after having been hospitalized with influenza.)

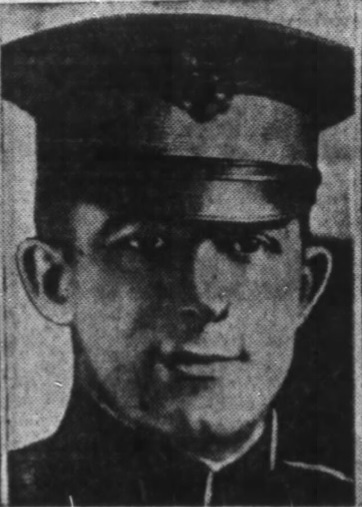
1918 photo of Alexander Cronkhite by Underwood & Underwood. Reproduced in Chicago Tribune, February 15, 1923.

For two years, Adelbert Cronkhite attempted to have the War Department re-open the investigation. When this did not happen, he tried to convince the Justice Department to pursue the investigation and prosecute the two soldiers he believed to be guilty. The Justice Department eventually took up the investigation, and law enforcement agents were able to obtain multiple confessions from the sergeant who had been with Alexander Cronkhite at the time of the shooting; the sergeant implicated the captain who had been in temporary command. With no motive immediately obvious, Adelbert Cronkhite suggested that the killing of his son was part of a plot to ruin his, Adelbert's, reputation. Because the captain who was implicated was Jewish, members of the right wing press, led by Henry Ford's newspaper The Dearborn Independent, claimed that the shooting was murder, and that the captain had forced the sergeant to carry it out in the captain's supposed role as a "'German Jew Spy' and also a Bolshevik agent".

The sergeant eventually repudiated his confessions, claiming they had been coerced. The agents who obtained them admitted to harsh interrogation techniques, so the confessions were excluded at the sergeant's trial in October 1924. With the prosecution case largely consisting of the argument that it was impossible for Alexander Cronkhite to have shot himself by accident, given the angle of the shot and the distance of the gun from his body when it was fired, their central claim collapsed when the captain's counsel and Alexander Cronkhite's friend, Eugene M. Caffey, and a second officer each demonstrated in court that an accidental shooting that fit the circumstances was not only possible, but that it was simple to recreate a plausible series of events which could have resulted in Alexander Cronkhite pulling the trigger by mistake. The sergeant was quickly acquitted; charges against the captain were soon dropped.

Adelbert Cronkhite had refused to accept assignment as commander of the Panama Canal Zone so that he could continue to pursue the investigation into his son's death. This refusal, coupled with his public denunciation of the Attorney General for not pursuing the case rapidly enough, brought him into disfavor with the Secretary of War John W. Weeks and John J. Pershing, the Army Chief of Staff. As a result, Cronkhite was retired against his will "for the convenience of the government" in 1923.

== Awards ==
Cronkhite received the Distinguished Service Medal for his World War I service. In addition, he was a recipient of the French Croix de Guerre with Palm and Legion of Honor (Commander), and the British Order of St Michael and St George (Knight Commander).

In addition to his United States Army and international military awards, Cronkhite was also a recipient of the Virginia Distinguished Service Medal, which the governor and adjutant general presented to several individuals who commanded Virginia soldiers during World War I, including Philippe Pétain and John J. Pershing.

=== Distinguished Service Medal citation ===
General Orders: War Department, General Orders No. 12 (1919) Action Date: World War I Service: Army Rank: Major General Company: Commanding General Division: 80th Division, American Expeditionary Forces

The President of the United States of America, authorized by Act of Congress, July 9, 1918, takes pleasure in presenting the Army Distinguished Service Medal to Major General Adelbert Cronkhite, United States Army, for exceptionally meritorious and distinguished services to the Government of the United States, in a duty of great responsibility during World War I. General Cronkhite commanded the 80th Division during the Argonne-Meuse offensive, where he demonstrated great ability as a leader and proved himself a commander of initiative and courage.

== Later life ==
After retiring, Cronkhite lived in the Pittsburgh, Pennsylvania area, was active in several veterans' organizations, and was a sought after speaker for reunions, Independence Day commemorations, and other ceremonies. Until the end of his life he argued that his son had not died accidentally, and that the murderers had gone unpunished.

== Death and burial ==
Cronkhite died in St. Petersburg, Florida on June 15, 1937. He was buried at West Point Cemetery, Section K, Site 26.

== Family ==
Adelbert Cronkhite's father was Henry M. Cronkhite, a physician and Union Army veteran of the American Civil War who remained in the Army until retiring as a lieutenant colonel in 1895. His mother was Eleanor (Nellis) Cronkhite (1837–1892).

He was the husband of Annie Estelle Pennington (1865–1932), the daughter of Army Brigadier General Alexander Cummings McWhorter Pennington Jr. Her other family members included grandfather Alexander C. M. Pennington Sr., a member of Congress from New Jersey, as well as other members of the Pennington family who served in offices including Governor of New Jersey and Speaker of the United States House of Representatives.

In addition to their son Alexander, Adelbert and Annie Cronkhite were the parents of a daughter, Dorothy (1890–1954).

Following the death of his first wife, in 1933 Cronkhite married Gertrude E. Horne of Pittsburgh. Gertrude Horne Cronkhite was active in veterans' organizations, and died in Pittsburgh on February 3, 1954.

== Published works ==
In 1893, Cronkhite authored Gunnery for Non-commissioned Officers. This work was a compilation of information on cannons, ammunition, fuses, and other details necessary to master the use of artillery in combat.

== Legacy ==
The Army honored Cronkhite by naming a Marin County, California Coast Artillery post as Fort Cronkhite in the late 1930s. The fort was abandoned after World War II. The site, which is now part of the Golden Gate National Recreation Area, includes the Marine Mammal Center. The remains of the military post also include a disarmed but intact 16-inch gun battery.

== Sources ==
=== Books ===
- 318th Infantry Regiment (1920). History of the 318th Infantry Regiment of the 80th Division. Richmond, VA: William Byrd Press. p. 58. ISBN 9785871963302.
- American Battle Monuments Commission (1944). 80th Division, Summary of Operations in the World War. Washington, DC: U.S. Government Printing Office. pp. 1, 4 – via Google Books.
- Association of Graduates (1938). Annual Report of the Association of Graduates of the United States Military Academy at West Point. Newburgh, NY: Moore Printing Company. pp. 318–319.
- Case, Nelson (1901). History of Labette County, Kansas, and Representative Citizens. Chicago, IL: Biographical Publishing Company. pp. 620–621.
- Cronkhite, Adelbert (1893). Gunnery for Non-commissioned Officers. New York, NY: John Wiley & Sons. p. title page.
- Davis, Henry Blaine Jr. (1998). Generals in Khaki. Raleigh, NC: Pentland Press. pp. 88–89. ISBN 978-1-57197-088-6.
- Hart, Albert Bushnell (1920). Harper's Pictorial Library of the World War. Vol. 5. New York, NY: Harper & Brothers. p. 364.
- Kettleborough, Charles, Director, Legislative Reference Bureau (1919). Yearbook of the State of Indiana for the Year 1918. Indianapolis, IN: Wm. P. Burford, state printer. p. 620.
- National Cyclopedia of American Biography. Vol. XVII. New York, NY: James T. White & Company. 1920. p. 176.
- Thompson, Erwin N. (1979). Historic Resource Study, Forts Baker, Barry, Cronkhite of Golden Gate National Recreation Area, California. Denver, CO: Denver Service Center, U.S. Department of the Interior. p. 115.
- United States Secretary of War (1904). Annual Reports of the War Department. Vol. IV. Washington, DC: US Government Printing Office. p. 108.
- Venzon, Anne Cipriano (2012). The United States in the First World War: An Encyclopedia. New York, NY: Routledge. p. 674. ISBN 978-0-8153-3353-1.
- State of Virginia (1933). Annual Reports of Officers, Boards and Institutions of the Commonwealth of Virginia. Richmond, VA: Superintendent of Public Printing. pp. 6, 17. "...during the ceremony in honor of ex-Governor Harry Flood Byrd at Hampton, Va., on October 4, 1932, at which time he was presented the Distinguished Service Medal by The Adjutant General ...In addition, the Military Board has directed that the same honor be extended to the following War Commanders under whom Virginia troops served in action: Maréchal Henri Pétain, General John J. Pershing, Major General Chas. G. Morton, Commander 29th Division, Major General Adelbert Cronkhite, Commander 80th Division"

=== Newspapers ===
- "Her Wedding a Surprise" (PDF). The New York Times. New York, NY. August 19, 1911. p. 7.
- "Cronkhite Speaks to Veterans' Post". Pittsburgh Post-Gazette. Pittsburgh, PA. November 10, 1932. p. 12 – via Newspapers.com.
- "Moving Day Taxes Skill of General Who Led Army". Pittsburgh Press. Pittsburgh, PA. April 3, 1933. p. 1 – via Newspapers.com.
- "Noted War Leader Dies in South: Gen. Cronkhite was Honored by Three Nations". Pittsburgh Post-Gazette. Pittsburgh, PA. June 16, 1937. p. 4 – via Newspapers.com.
- "Gen. A. Cronkhite, led 80th Division". The New York Times. New York, NY. June 16, 2020. p. 23 – via TimesMachine.
- "War Leader's Widow Dies". Pittsburgh Press. Pittsburgh, PA. February 4, 1954. p. 39 – via Newspapers.com.

=== Internet ===
- Thayer, Bill. "Adelbert Cronkhite: Transcription of Entries in Biographical Register of the Officers and Graduates of the United States Military Academy at West Point". penelope.uchicago.edu. Bill Thayer.
- "Burial Record, Adelbert Cronkhite". Nationwide Gravesite Locator. United States Department of Veterans Affairs, National Cemetery Administration. Archived from the original on June 1, 2019.
- Denfeld, Duane Colt (March 17, 2011). "Major Alexander P. Cronkhite is shot and killed during training exercise at Fort Lewis on October 25, 1918". History Link.org. Seattle WA: History Ink.
- "Virginia Death Records, 1912–2014, entry for Dorothy C. Roberson". Ancestry.com. Provo, UT: Ancestry.com, LLC. January 21, 1954.
- "Distinguished Service Medal Citation, Adelbert Cronkhite". Hall of Valor. Springfield, VA: Army Times.
- "Basic Fighting Unit of the AEF: The Square Division". Doughboy Center: The Story of the American Expeditionary Forces. MIchael E. Hanlon.

=== Magazines ===
- Keene, Jennifer (January 2002). "A Comparative Study of White and Black American Soldiers during the First World War: Selecting Men for the Army". Annales de démographie historique. Paris, France: Editions Belin. p. 72.
