= Frederic B. Butler =

United States Army general (1896–1987)

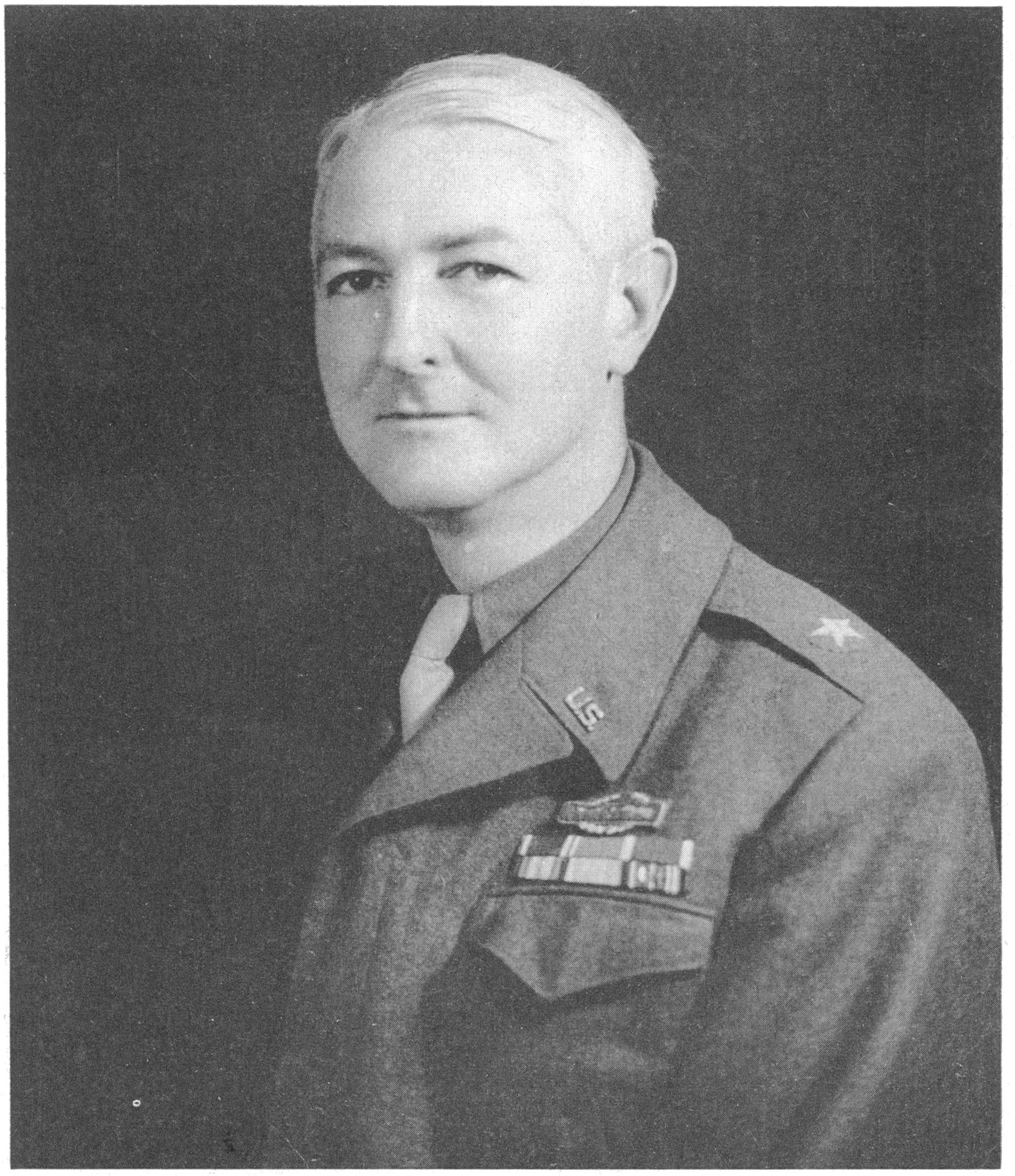
- Born: 5 October 1896; San Francisco, California, U.S.
- Died: 20 June 1987 (aged 90); San Francisco, California, U.S.
- Spouse: Philippi Harriette Harding (m. 1924; died 1984)
- Children: 3
- Military career
- Allegiance: United States
- Branch: Corps of Engineers
- Service years: 1918–1953
- Rank: Brigadier General
- Commands: Camp McCoy; 7th Engineer Brigade; 168th Infantry Regiment; 1st Engineer Battalion
- Conflicts: World War I; World War II; North African campaign; Tunisian campaign; Italian campaign; Southern France campaign
- Awards: Distinguished Service Cross; Legion of Merit (2); Bronze Star Medal; Purple Heart; Croix de Guerre 1939–1945 with palm (France); Officer of the Legion of Honor (France); War Cross of Military Valor (Italy); Knight of the Sovereign Military Order of Malta (Vatican)

Brigadier General Frederic Bates Butler (5 October 1896 – 20 June 1987) was the U.S. Army officer who led the American Task Force in the encirclement action of Operation Dragoon at the Battle of Montelimar, France, in World War II. A 1918 graduate of the United States Military Academy at West Point, New York, he served with Roy Chapman Andrews's expedition to Mongolia in 1925 and worked on Treasure Island for the 1939–1940 Golden Gate International Exposition. During World War II he was awarded the Distinguished Service Cross for his leadership of the 168th Infantry in the Italian campaign.

== Early life ==
Frederic Bates Butler was born in San Francisco, California on 5 October 1896. He was educated at St. Ignatius College Preparatory, a Jesuit school in San Francisco, where he graduated from in 1913. He was a cadet at the United States Military Academy at West Point, New York, from 15 June 1916 to 1 November 1918. On graduation, ranked eighth in his class, he was commissioned as a second lieutenant in the United States Army Corps of Engineers. He was at Camp A. A. Humphreys, Virginia, as a student officer at the United States Army Engineer School there from 2 December 1918 until June 1919, when he was sent to France with American Expeditionary Forces on a tour of observation of the World War I battlefields. He returned to Camp A. A. Humphreys in September. He was promoted to first lieutenant on 7 May 1919, and graduated in June 1921.

== Between the wars ==
Butler commanded the Headquarters and Service Company of the 13th Engineers from June 1921 until September 1922, when became a student officer at the Field Artillery School at Fort Sill, Oklahoma. In January 1923, He became aide-de-camp to Commanding General, U.S. Army Forces in China, Brigadier General William D. Connor. On 12 November 1924, he married Philippi Harriette Harding in St Louis Church, Tientsin, China. She had worked as a secretary for Lou Henry Hoover while she was a senior at Stanford University and continued in this role until she left to marry him in China. The couple had two daughters, Patricia M. Butler and Phillipa "Popsy" Butler, and a son, Bill Butler.

In 1925, Butler joined the Third Asiatic Expedition of the American Museum of Natural History, led by naturalist Roy Chapman Andrews. The expedition left for Mongolia on 11 April 1925. As a cartographer, Butler was part of the three-member topographic team headed by Major L. B. Roberts, who traveled a couple of days in advance of the main party to record the route and map places of scientific interest. Butler returned to Tientsin in August 1925. He wrote reports and gave lectures on his experiences.

Butler was an instructor of tactics at West Point from June 1926 to August 1927, when he was assigned to the U.S. Engineer's office in San Francisco. Philippi resumed her work for Lou Hoover there. After Lou's husband Herbert Hoover became President of the United States in 1929, she became Lou's secretary at the White House, and was in charge of responding to pleas for assistance during the Great Depression. Butler was reassigned to Washington, D.C., in April 1930 as the assistant director of Public Buildings and Grounds. This included the White House, which, although not the largest public building in terms of floor size or volume, consumed the majority of his time.

Hoover left office in 1933, and one of the first things the new president, Franklin D. Roosevelt, did was transfer responsibility for public buildings and grounds from the War Department to the Department of the Interior. Butler returned to West Point on 15 March 1933, and once again became aide-de-camp to Connor, who was now the superintendent. After more than fifteen years as a first lieutenant, Butler was promoted to captain in the Corps of Engineers on 1 November 1934. He was the Assistant District Engineer in Los Angeles from 18 November 1935 to 5 January 1936, and in San Francisco from 6 January 1936 to 3 September 1939. He worked on Treasure Island for the 1939–1940 Golden Gate International Exposition and supervised roadwork on nearby Yerba Buena Island. After the fair ended, Treasure Island was sold to the U.S. Navy and became a base of operations in the Pacific War.

== World War II ==
From 6 September 1939 to 2 February 1940, Butler was a student officer at the United States Army Command and General Staff College and Fort Leavenworth, Kansas. He then was posted to Fort Belvoir for service with the 5th Engineers. He was promoted to major on 1 July 1940, and in November he assumed command of the 1st Engineer Battalion, which was part of the 1st Infantry Division. He was promoted to lieutenant Colonel on 15 September 1941 and colonel on 1 February 1942. In June 1942, after the United States entered World War II, he joined the staff of the 1st Infantry Division. The division moved to Northern Ireland, and then participated in Operation Torch, the Allied invasion of French North Africa in November 1942.

In December 1942, Butler became the G-3 (operations officer) at the headquarters of II Corps at the Hotel de France in Gafsa, Tunisia. For this service he was awarded the Legion of Merit. On 23 February 1943, he assumed command of the 168th Infantry Regiment, whose commander (and many of his men) had been captured in the Battle of Sidi Bou Zid. He led the regiment, part of the 34th Infantry Division, for the rest of the Tunisian campaign and then in the Italian campaign. He was awarded the Distinguished Service Cross and the Purple Heart for his leadership in October 1943. He was subsequently awarded an oak leaf cluster to his Legion of Merit. He was promoted to brigadier general on 17 January 1944 and became the deputy division commander of the 34th Infantry Division.

Butler became the deputy commander of the VI Corps in March 1944. On 1 August, in preparation for Operation Dragoon, the Allied invasion of Southern France, the VI Corps commander, Major General Lucian K. Truscott placed Butler in change of an ad hoc armored force known as Task Force Butler. (Note: His commander, General Lucian Truscott, erroneously referred to "Frederick W Butler" in his memoirs, but later quotes one of Butler's letters to him signed "FBB" which reveals his error. The mistaken middle initial is repeated in some other histories.) In Southern France, he led Task Force Butler in the Battle of Montelimar. Truscott described Butler as "one of the most fearless men I ever met."

From September 1944 to January 1945, Butler was the deputy commander of the 45th Infantry Division. He then returned to the United States, where he commanded the 1st Infantry Replacement Training Center at Camp Fannin and Camp Howze, Texas from February to September 1945.

== Later life ==
After the war, Butler went to Australia as head of the Foreign Liquidation Commission there until January 1947. He then went to South Korea as Chief Engineer of the XXIV Corps until December, and back to San Francisco, where he was Chief Engineer of the Sixth Army until 14 April 1948, and commanded the Central Military District of the Sixth Army. From 1 December 1949 to 24 May 1950, he was the commanding general of the 7th Engineer Brigade. He then commanded the Granite City Engineer Department. His final assignment was as commander of Camp McCoy from 24 May 1951 to 6 February 1952 during the Korean War. He retired from the Army in April 1953.

After retiring from the Army, Butler served as manager of the San Francisco International Airport from 1954 to 1960, and he was a commissioner for the San Francisco Fire Department. Pope John XXIII made him a Knight of the Sovereign Military Order of Malta in 1962. He died in San Francisco on 20 June 1987.

== Awards and decorations ==
- Distinguished Service Cross
- Legion of Merit with the Oak Leaf Cluster
- Bronze Star
- Purple Heart
- Croix de Guerre 1939–1945 with palm (France)
- Officer of the Legion of Honor (France)
- War Cross of Military Valor (Italy)
- Knight of the Sovereign Military Order of Malta

== Dates of rank ==
Insignia	Rank	Component	Date	Reference
	Second Lieutenant	Corps of Engineers	1 November 1918	
	First Lieutenant	Corps of Engineers	7 May 1919	
	Captain	Corps of Engineers	1 November 1934	
	Major	Corps of Engineers	1 July 1940	
	Lieutenant Colonel	Army of the United States	15 September 1941	
	Colonel	Army of the United States	1 February 1942	
	Brigadier General	Army of the United States	17 January 1944	

== Works cited ==
- Ancell, R. Manning; Miller, Christine (1996). The Biographical Dictionary of World War II Generals and Flag Officers: The US Armed Forces. Westport, Connecticut: Greenwood Press. ISBN 0-313-29546-8.
- Cullum, George W. (1920). Biographical Register of the Officers and Graduates of the US Military Academy at West Point New York since its Establishment in 1802: Supplement Volume VI 1910–1920. Chicago, Illinois: R. R. Donnelly and Sons, The Lakeside Press.
- Cullum, George W. (1930). Biographical Register of the Officers and Graduates of the US Military Academy at West Point New York since its Establishment in 1802: Supplement Volume VII 1920–1930. Chicago, Illinois: R. R. Donnelly and Sons, The Lakeside Press.
- Cullum, George W. (1940). Biographical Register of the Officers and Graduates of the US Military Academy at West Point New York since its Establishment in 1802: Supplement Volume VIII 1930–1940. Chicago, Illinois: R. R. Donnelly and Sons, The Lakeside Press.
- Cullum, George W. (1950). Biographical Register of the Officers and Graduates of the US Military Academy at West Point New York since its Establishment in 1802: Supplement Volume IX 1940–1950. Chicago, Illinois: R. R. Donnelly and Sons, The Lakeside Press.
- Devers, Jacob L. (Summer 1946). "Operation Dragoon: The Invasion of Southern France". Military Affairs. 10 (2): 2–41. doi:10.2307/1983451. JSTOR 1983451.
- Howe, George F. (1957). Northwest Africa: Seizing the Initiative in the West (PDF). United States Army in World War II – The Mediterranean Theater of Operations. Washington, DC: Office of the Chief of Military History, Department of the Army. OCLC 833964. Archived from the original (PDF) on 27 September 2012.
- Truscott, Lucian King Jr. (1954). Command Missions, A Personal Story. New York: E. P. Dutton And Company – via Internet Archive.
