= 130th Engineer Brigade =

Engineer brigade of US army

- U.S. 130th Engineer Brigade insignia
- Active: 5 May 1943 – 31 January 1946; 25 September 1955 – 25 June 1956; 16 June 1969 – 4 May 2007; 23 October 2008 – present
- Country: United States of America
- Branch: United States Army
- Type: Engineer Brigade
- Role: Combat Engineering; Construction Engineering
- Size: Brigade
- Part of: 8th Theater Sustainment Command
- Garrison/HQ: Schofield Barracks, Hawaii
- Motto: SAPPERS IN!
- Engagements: Operation Joint Endeavour; Operation Iraqi Freedom; Operation Enduring Freedom

Commanders
- Current commander: COL James “Jim” A. Beaulieu (since 21 June 2024)
- Command Sergeant Major: CSM Christipher R. Shetland
- Notable commanders: LTG Todd T. Semonite; MG Diana M. Holland

Insignia
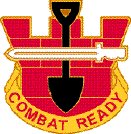
- Distinctive Unit Insignia

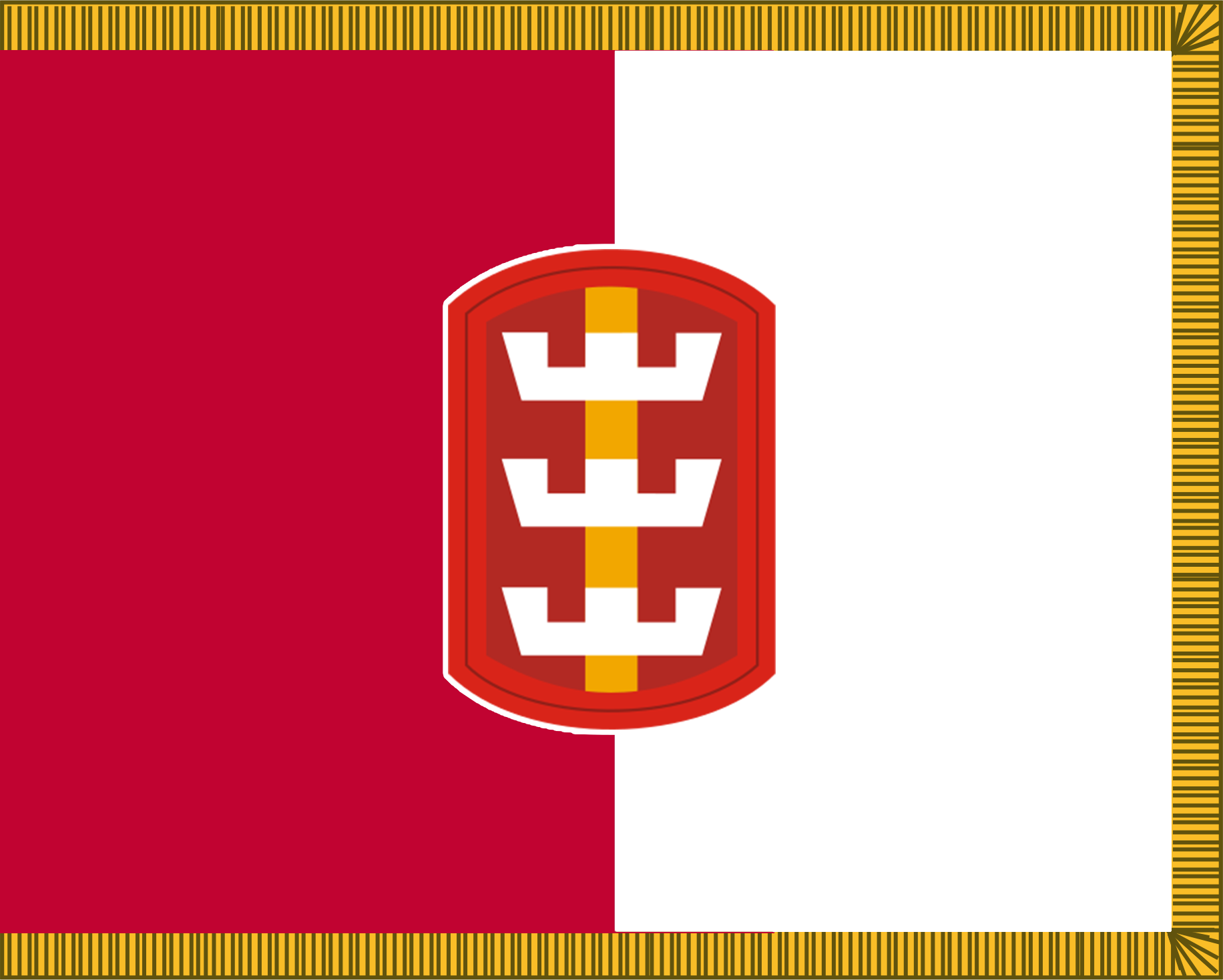
- 130th Engineer Brigade Flag

The 130th Engineer Brigade is an engineer brigade of the United States Army headquartered in Schofield Barracks, Hawaii that provides engineering support to the United States Army Pacific. The brigade specializes in combat engineering, construction, and bridging operations.

The brigade traces its lineage back to an engineering regiment active during World War II, but the brigade itself did not see real-world action until the mid-1990s. As a part of the V Corps for most of the Cold War, the brigade was stationed in western Europe as a deterrent to a possible Soviet aggression and/or invasion. It finally saw action in 1991 when the Brigades 317th Engineer Battalion was deployed for Operation Desert Shield/Storm. The 317th provided support for the 1st Infantry Division during the ground war and its Delta Company received a Presidential unit citation. The brigade was also deployed in Operation Joint Endeavor, providing bridging assistance for the international force in the Bosnia region. Several years later, the brigade was the primary engineering component during the invasion of Iraq in 2003. With numerous difficulties, the brigade was forced to take on several unexpected missions during its year in Iraq. It saw a second tour in 2005 and a third in 2009 in which it once again was the primary engineering component in the country. The brigade deployed to Afghanistan as the Theater Engineer Brigade in support of Operation Enduring Freedom from 2013 to 2014.

The brigade had a long history of supporting V Corps of United States Army Europe from 1969 until 2007, during which it was based at Warner Barracks in the Bavarian town of Bamberg, Germany. That ended when the brigade was relocated to Hawaii to support United States Army Pacific as part of a major restructuring plan of the United States Army. Reactivated in 2008, the brigade is currently based out of Schofield Barracks in Hawaii.

== Organization ==
The 130th Engineer Brigade is a subordinate unit of the 8th Theater Sustainment Command which is operationally controlled by United States Army Pacific. It provides engineering assistance to United States forces stationed throughout the Indo-Pacific region.

The Brigade's Headquarters and Headquarters Company is stationed at Schofield Barracks and permanently commands two subordinate battalions. The 11th Engineer Battalion located at Camp Humphreys, Korea, and the 84th Engineer Battalion located at Schofield Barracks. The total force of the brigade is approximately 1,600 personnel. As the brigade is modular in nature, it is able to take command and control of more units when deployed.

== History ==
=== Origins ===
The 130th Engineer Brigade traces its lineage to the 1303rd Engineer General Service Regiment which saw action in World War II. The regiment was activated on 15 July 1943 at Camp Ellis, Illinois. It was deployed to the European Theatre where it participated in the Battle of Normandy and subsequent invasion of Germany before being transferred to the Pacific after V-E Day. The 1303rd received campaign streamers for Normandy, Northern France, Rhineland, Ardennes-Alsace, Central Europe, and the Asian-Pacific theatre. It was deactivated in Japan on 31 January 1946.

The regiment was re-designated as Headquarters and Headquarters Company, 130th Engineer Aviation Brigade in Japan on 8 July 1955 before being activated in September of that year. Only a few months later, this brigade was inactivated on 25 June 1956 without having seen any deployment.

On 16 June 1969, Headquarters and Headquarters Company, 130th Engineer Aviation Brigade was re-designated as Headquarters and Headquarters Company, 130th Engineer Brigade and activated in Pioneer Kaserne, Hanau, Germany. The 130th Engineer Brigade was a consolidation of V Corps' 37th and 11th Engineer Groups into a single unit that would provide more efficient command and control. It was subsequently put under the command of V Corps, as part of United States Army Europe. The brigade received its shoulder sleeve insignia on 23 September 1969, and its distinctive unit insignia on 3 November 1969. Brigade members specially designed these with images alluding to the 1303rd Regiment's battle honors in World War II using scarlet and white, colors signifying US Army engineer units.

The brigade remained in Germany in support of V Corps for almost 25 years, on the Cold War frontline against the Warsaw Pact and Soviet 8th Guards Army. It underwent a shuffling of units as several of its battalions were reassigned elsewhere following the end of the Cold War in 1990, and it gained new battalions from units deactivating elsewhere. Though three of the brigade's subordinate battalions deployed to support Operation Desert Shield and Operation Desert Storm, the brigade headquarters itself remained in Germany along with the rest of V Corps. The operations were conducted by VII Corps and XVIII Airborne Corps, which had significant engineer assets of their own. Throughout the early 1990s, the brigade would continue to see units come and go from its command as they were transferred from the restructuring 18th Engineer Brigade and the deactivating 7th Engineer Brigade (United States).

=== Operation Joint Endeavour ===
From December 1995 to January 1996, all units in the brigade, except the 320th Engineer Company (Topographic), deployed to Croatia or Bosnia and Herzegovina in support of Operation Joint Endeavor. The 320th Engineer Company deployed their topographic surveying platoon the following year. The 130th Engineer Brigade was tasked with building an assault bridge over the Sava River. Despite severe flooding conditions around the river and international pressure against such a structure, the brigade sent its units to begin work on the bridge. In December 1995, the 502nd Engineer Company deployed to Zupanja, Croatia and placed the historic ribbon bridge over the river. This bridge, at 2,239 feet (682 m) was the longest assault floating bridge in military history. The company operated 24-hours a day for three months crossing critical traffic in support of Task Force Eagle and NATO's Implementation Force. The company also assisted in the construction of a second bridge over the Sava River in Brčko-Gunja. The 502nd Engineer Company redeployed in May 1996, with a rafting section remaining at Slavonski Brod to support the force restructuring of Task Force Eagle. The 130th Engineer Brigade would go on to construct seven fixed bridges in support of the operation. During the deployment, the brigade was also tasked with creating and maintaining maps and overlays of the area of operations. It would produce over 300,000 such maps. The 130th Engineer Brigade was also tasked with repairing and maintaining much of the Task Force's infrastructure.

The brigade returned to Germany after the operation was complete. Throughout 1998–2002 it would train with German engineers, including German units from Lahnstein and Speyer, as well as the German Engineering School. The brigade also set up marksman competitions with German units, to give US soldiers the chance to earn the German Armed Forces Badge of Marksmanship, the German Sports Badge, and other badges. Over 2,500 of these badges would be earned by soldiers of the 130th over the years that it served in Germany. It also trained extensively in bridging operations at rivers throughout Germany. In summer of 2000, the brigade participated in a joint engineering exercise in Moldova with US Navy Seabees and the 505th Engineer Brigade of the North Carolina Army National Guard. The exercise was the first ever conducted in Moldova and featured numerous training scenarios as well as the construction of a medical clinic. Several other such exercises were conducted in nations throughout Europe including Albania, Romania, Georgia, Latvia, Bulgaria and Macedonia. They also performed annual humanitarian missions to Poland, working on community projects around the country with the assistance of Polish Armed Forces every September, as a training exercise.

=== Operation Iraqi Freedom ===
The 130th Engineer Brigade mobilized for the 2003 invasion of Iraq. It was commanded by Colonel Gregg F. Martin. As preparations were being made for Operation Iraqi Freedom, the 130th Engineer Brigade was placed in charge of the largest engineering force in the theater. This included seven different engineering battalions as well as several separate group and company-sized elements. Units of the brigade were then deployed to Kuwait in early 2003, along with much of V Corps' staff. They would provide command and assistance for the 3rd Infantry Division, 82nd Airborne Division and 101st Airborne Division as they crossed the border to Iraq and attacked to the capitol region of Baghdad from the south. Coupled with the landings of the 173rd Airborne Brigade Combat Team to the north, the operation would see the US Forces surround and destroy Iraqi forces in and around the capitol.

The first obstacle facing the brigade was "the berm", a 10-kilometer-deep defensive obstacle complex that spanned Iraq's border with Kuwait. The berm consisted of large tank ditches, berms of dirt, electrified fencing, and razor wire. It was decided that the 3rd Infantry Division's Brigade Combat Teams would breach this berm in eight locations and move through. The 130th Engineer brigade analyzed the berms and provided a layout of them to coalition forces. The 130th Engineer Brigade then conducted the actual breaches in late March, using CEV, armored combat earthmovers to build roads for tracked vehicles, while armored vehicle-launched bridges set up for wheeled vehicles. The 130th worked with Kuwaiti engineers to breach the berm in 12 places, and the 3rd Infantry Division's Brigade Combat Teams moved through, starting the Iraq War. After combat forces moved through, the brigade and the Kuwaitis then sealed off ten of these breaches to prevent Iraqi forces from using then, leaving two open for US forces that followed from the 82nd and 101st.

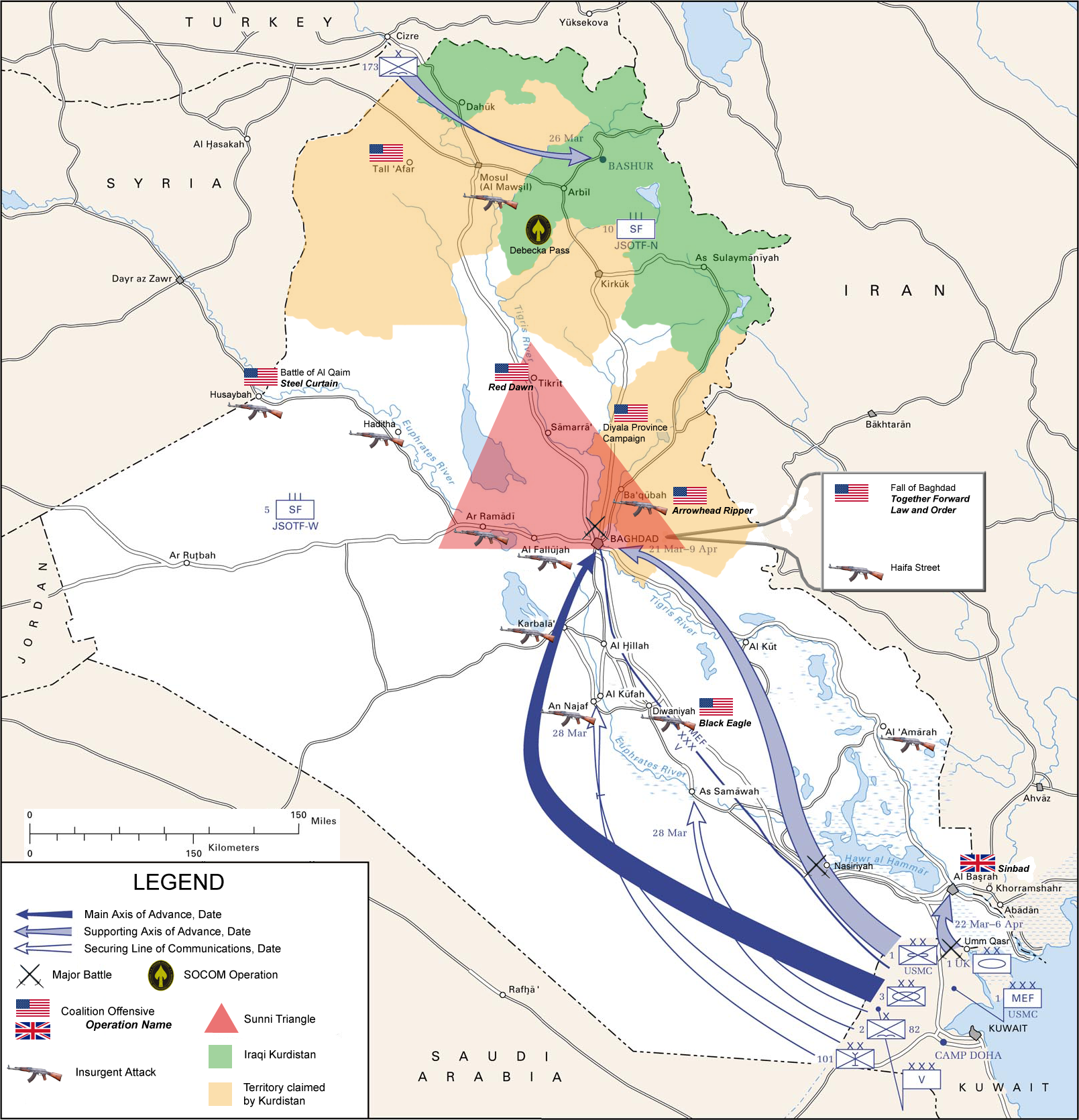
Battle plan for the Iraq War, with V Corps attacking the country from Kuwait to the southeast.

After the breach, the 130th moved into Iraq. They provided support for the divisions as they advanced along the path to Baghdad. When a large sandstorm grounded aviation and large dust clouds became a problem, the brigade repurposed oil for use in dust abatement around airfields, allowing the 101st's fleet of AH-64 Apaches to take off and engage Iraqi ground forces on 24 March. Retreating Iraqi units detonated many bridges to slow the 3rd Infantry Division's advance. The 130th Engineers conducted rapid repairs to allow the brigades to continue to move through. The brigade supported combat elements moving through An Najaf, clearing roads and pathways of debris and obstacles to allow rapid movement through the city. The 565th Engineer Battalion built the "birthday bridge" – the longest float bridge constructed in a combat theatre with a span of 580 meters – over the Tigris River in Tikrit on Saddam Hussein's birthday, 28 April 2003.

After the invasion was over, the brigade was supposed to support the operation with bridging and infrastructure support. During the planning for the invasion, the engineers of the brigade were told that reconstruction in Iraq would be conducted by Department of Defense contractors and Iraqi civilians. They were not originally prepared to conduct major reconstruction efforts. When V Corps became the commanding element for the task force to rebuild Iraq, much of the invasion force, including the 130th Engineer Brigade, was sent to do jobs they had not been originally planned for, as basic utilities and sanitation conditions in Iraq were far below what was expected. Throughout the rest of 2003 and 2004, the engineers engaged in a large number of initial reconstruction projects on basic utilities, including schools, water treatment plants, waste removal, and the nation's power grid. It was determined that the scale of these projects was much greater than what the US had expected or what had been encountered in previous contingencies. It was also decided that reconstruction was essential to the coalition since it would help win over the Iraqi people. By May 2003, the brigade had been completely repurposed. Though originally tasked with demolishing obstacles, building fortifications, and bridging operations, the brigade was tasked entirely with construction projects. This conversion was a difficult process, as the brigade did not have the equipment and specialist units designed to handle reconstruction on a national scale. As more US military reconstruction units arrived in Iraq, the brigade grew to eight battalions and three groups.

The 130th Engineer Brigade focused on bridging projects as was its specialty, but it ultimately found itself undertaking numerous different projects throughout the country for much of 2003 and into 2004. Not all of its units were confined entirely to construction, though. The 502nd Engineer Company also conducted river patrol operations in Baghdad and Tikrit. This new mission for the company was essential for force protection, troop transportation, search and cordon operations, and to protect against sabotage on fixed bridges. In September 2003, with the inactivation of the 38th Engineer Company (Medium Girder Bridge), the 502nd Engineer Company became a multi-role bridge company with both float and fixed bridging capabilities and the only active bridge company in USAREUR.

The 130th was headquartered at Logistical Support Area Anaconda for the majority of the deployment. Throughout Operation Iraqi Freedom, the headquarters commanded up to 15,000 engineers at one time, conducting missions including bridging, humanitarian assistance, topographic missions, dive missions, firefighting, base construction, river patrols, mine detection, missile removal and many more. Brigade units redeployed to Hanau in late 2003 and early 2004. Most of the brigade's soldiers returned to Hanau on 5 February 2004 after numerous logistical delays. Most of the 130th Engineer Brigade's subordinate units would receive Meritorious Unit Commendation for their roles in the invasion of Iraq, though the Brigade's headquarters did not.

=== Second tour in Iraq ===
The 502nd Engineer Company became the first V Corps company-sized unit to return for a second tour in Iraq when it deployed in September 2004. The company returned to Hanau in September 2005. In December 2004, the 130th Engineer Brigade's headquarters was informed that it would be deployed back to Iraq the next year. The brigade mobilized and began this new deployment in September 2005; it began operating in the country the next month. The 54th Engineer Battalion followed in October. The brigade eventually replaced the 130th, 194th, and 20th Engineer Brigades, becoming the only engineer brigade operating in the country. By December 2006, the brigade commanded all engineering formations in Multi-National Corps - Iraq, including engineers from other branches of the US Military, for a total of 3,300 soldiers. During the tour they were supported by the 412th Engineer Command.

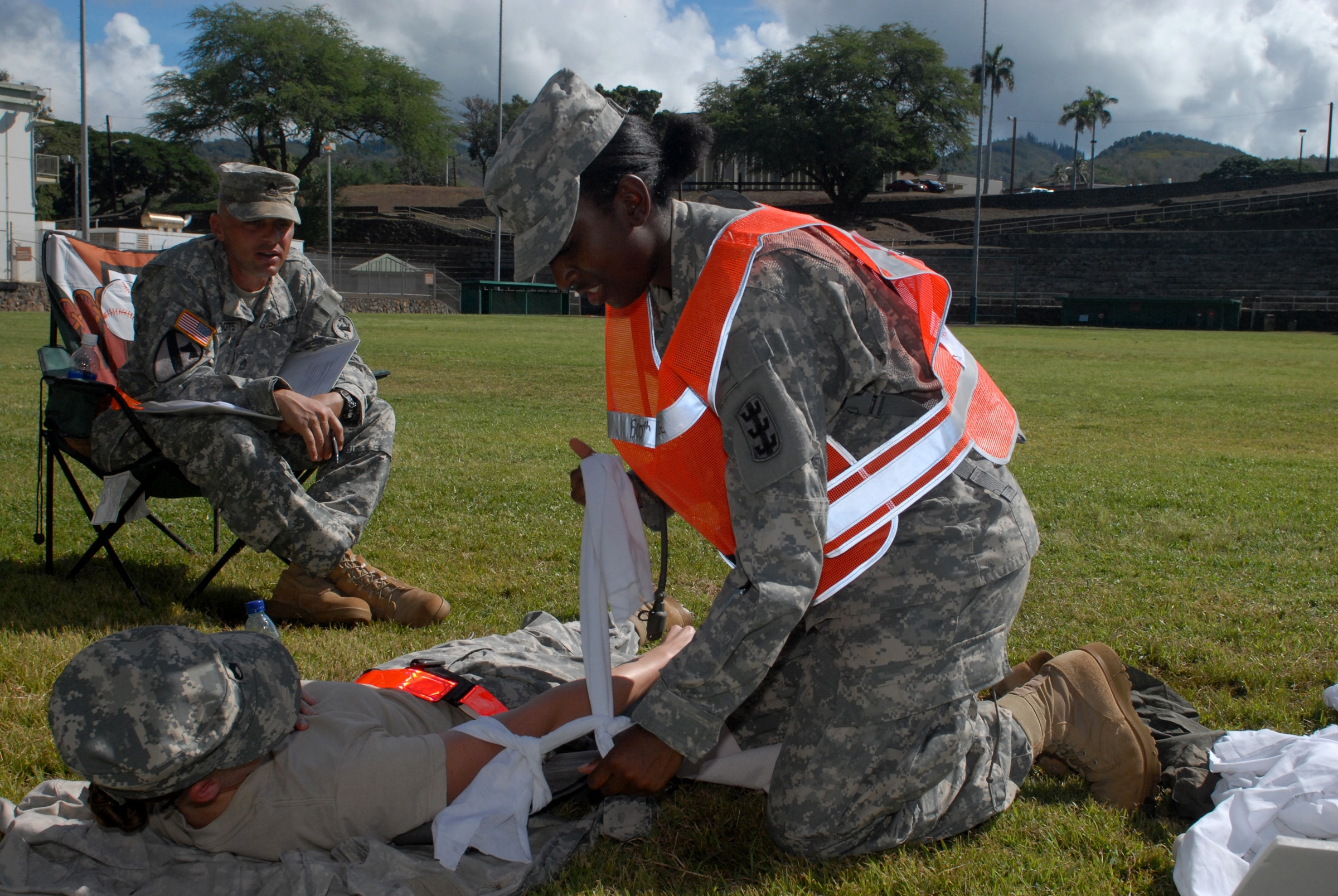
A Brigade soldier performing simulated first aid during an exercise

The 130th Engineers had a variety of reconstruction tasks during their second tour in Iraq. The top priority of the brigade was to "maintain and upgrade lines of communications" to "insure uninterrupted ground movement through the area of operations." This duty also included detection and removal of Improvised Explosive Devices. The brigade undertook numerous construction projects, primarily in building coalition forward operating bases, but they were tasked with construction projects for the Iraqi army and civilians as well. Many of the units of the brigade were integrated with military from other branches for projects. US Navy and US Marine Corps engineers operated side by side with 130th Engineer Brigade soldiers, and though commanders reported a "culture clash" between different branches of service, the soldiers, sailors, and Marines were able to adapt to the situation quickly.

The brigade's Headquarters Company managed the engineer battalions but it also undertook its own missions, including humanitarian missions and public affairs assignments. It was supported by the brigade's Special Troops Battalion which provided a wide range of duties for the Headquarters. The task of detecting and removing IEDs proved particularly difficult for the brigade, as IEDs were a serious issue for coalition forces and the leading cause of casualties at the time. The 54th Engineer Battalion under the 130th was specially tasked with counter-IED operations on the over 300 kilometers of roads that the brigade was responsible for. The 249th Engineer Battalion was charged with maintaining the power grid throughout Iraq. They were required to assess 200 power stations throughout the country and make repairs to each one individually. The 84th Engineer Battalion was tasked with most construction projects in the Forward Operating Bases. These projects involved expansion of many of the larger FOBs as smaller ones were shut down and consolidated. One of the main focuses of the Battalion was the expansion of living quarters at Al Asad Air Base. The 565th Engineer Battalion was responsible for maintaining the supply yards housing building materials for the rest of the Brigade's battalions, and to ensure that the materials were dispersed and used as efficiently as possible. The brigade's mechanical and vehicle maintenance duties were provided by civilian contractors. These contractors also handled transportation of construction vehicles and vehicle parts to the theater.

During the year of its deployment in Iraq, the brigade reported progress in numerous areas. Brigade commander Colonel Thomas Kula reported that "greater than 50 percent" of IEDs found on roads used by the Corps were recognized and disarmed before they could be used against coalition forces. The brigade also cleared 700 kilometers of road from trash and debris and filled more than 600 potholes caused by explosions. It also completed 1,800 mapping projects in the theater. The brigade also finished numerous building projects around Iraq. Soldiers of the 130th Engineer Brigade completed 345 construction projects during the year in the country, including emplacing four bridges and maintaining eight more, well digging projects throughout western Iraq, maintaining the power grid to 25 coalition bases, repairing and expanding services at FOBs throughout the region, and construction of outposts and checkpoints throughout the country's roadways with the assistance of Iraqi engineers. During the deployment, a total of 15 soldiers from the brigade were killed in action. The 130th Engineer Brigade returned to Hanau from its second tour in Iraq in October 2006.

=== Reactivation in Hawaii ===
With Army forces in Europe experiencing draw-downs and re-deployments, it was announced that V Corps would be eliminated, and the 130th Engineer Brigade would be moved elsewhere. The brigade formally left Hanau with a Casing of the Colors ceremony at Pioneer Kaserne on 4 May 2007. Casing the unit's colors was a tradition formally signifying its inactivation and, for all official purposes, the brigade had ceased to be an active Army unit. The brigade headquarters became part of U.S. Army Pacific on 16 June 2007.

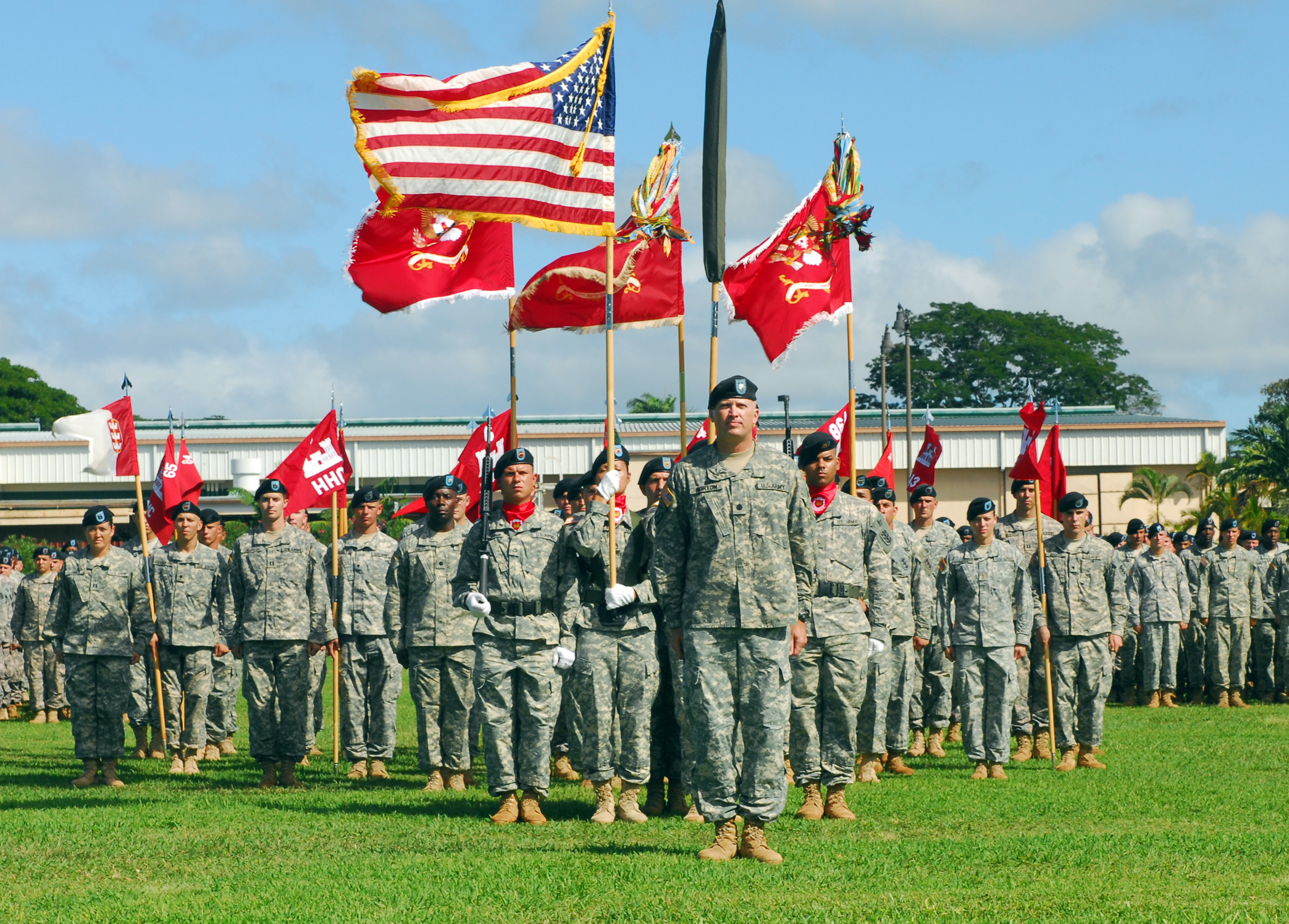
Officers of the brigade uncase its unit colors in Hawaii

The brigade had originally been slated to relocate to Fort Lewis, Washington to replace the 555th Engineer Brigade, which was scheduled to be inactivated. But with the announcement of the Grow the Army plan in early 2007, it was decided that no engineer brigades would be inactivated permanently, and the 130th Engineer Brigade would be moved to Hawaii instead. Both the 130th and 555th Engineer Brigades remained on active duty.

The brigade was inactive for a year while it was reconstructed in Hawaii. As a part of the transformation of the US Army, the brigade was reorganized into a modular force with new and updated equipment and new personnel. The Brigade stood up provisionally on 27 June 2008 as it neared ready status. On 23 October, the brigade's colors were formally uncased at Schofield Barracks, Hawaii. This signified the end of the brigade's relocation to Hawaii as well as its completion and readiness to take on new missions.

The brigade took command of the 6th, 65th and 84th Engineer battalions.

=== Third tour in Iraq ===
The brigade was alerted for another deployment to Operation Iraqi Freedom in summer 2009. There, its missions will once again include construction, route clearance, and training of Iraqi engineers. Since being alerted for deployment, the brigade began conducting vigorous Mission Rehearsal Exercise (MRE) training at Schofield Barracks. Among this training has been updated strategies for detection and clearance of Improvised Explosive Devices. The brigade began its deployment on 17 July 2009, uncasing its colors in Mosul and taking command of construction projects in the area from the 18th Engineer Brigade.

The 130th Engineer Brigade returned to Schofield Barracks Hawaii from Iraq on 4 June 2010.

=== Theater Security Cooperation Program Exercises ===
Upon the 130th Engineer Brigade's return from Iraq in 2010, the 130th Engineer Brigade served as the Theater Engineer Brigade in the PACOM AOR. In this capacity, the brigade provided combat engineering, construction engineering and dive operations support to joint and combined partners at more than 30 Theater Security Cooperation Program (TSCP) exercises and multiple company sized deployments to Operations New Dawn and Enduring Freedom.

The 130th Engineer Brigade served as the Combined Joint Civil Military Operations Task Force (CJMOTF) for Balikatan 2011 in the Philippines. For over two months, the brigade headquarters along with platoons from the 84th Engineer Battalion built schools and all-purpose facilities. Meanwhile, the brigade's subordinate joint partners conducted veterinarian and medical events to help improve the lives of the Filipino people. This event sharpened the brigade's skills at responding to humanitarian aid and disaster response (HADR) events throughout the region. Upon completion of BK11, the brigade shifted its training focus from stability operations to major combat operations. Specifically, the brigade initiated a 9-month train-up plan for its MCTP graded war-fighter with the 2nd Infantry Division in Korea. Through a series of individual and collective training events the brigade honed, sharpened and in some cases re-learned the skills necessary to achieve victory in a high-intensity conflict. Through UFG12, 2ID's War-Path II Exercise, and finally the Full Spectrum Exercise in November 2011, the 130th Engineer Brigade earned some of the highest marks and accolades ever given to a brigade by the MCTP during a certification war-fighter exercise. Through these series of exercises, the 130th Engineer Brigade helped USFK, 8th Army, and 2ID refine and improve their most significant OPLANs by updating TPFDDs, task organizations, engineer concepts of operations, and combined arms gap-crossing plans. The 130th Engineer Brigade, along with 8th Army and 2ID remain ready to "Fight Tonight" if called upon.

=== Operation Enduring Freedom ===
The 130th Engineer Brigade Headquarters and Headquarters Company (HHC), and one of their subordinate battalions, the 65th Engineer Battalion (Combat Effects), deployed in support of Operation Enduring Freedom in September and October 2013. This marked the brigade headquarters' first deployment to Afghanistan. After a two-week handover period, the 130th Engineer Brigade officially took over on 2 October 2013 from the 555th Engineer Brigade (from Joint Base Lewis-McChord, WA), Joint Task Force Triple Nickel, thus becoming Joint Task Force Sapper, overseeing U.S. Army, Navy, and Air Force engineer units across Afghanistan. A direct subordinate element of ISAF Joint Command and U.S. Forces-Afghanistan, JTF Sapper constituted the fourth largest command in theater, behind only regional commands. The 130th Engineer Brigade became the core of a provisional multi-role brigade headquarters for engineer operations in Afghanistan with seven subordinate battalions, one Naval Mobile Construction Battalion, and one Engineer Prime Beef Squadron consisting of over 4,200 Soldiers, Sailors and Airmen operating in each Regional Command.

From September to December 2013, Joint Task Force Sapper's mission in theater was "The Theater Engineer Brigade trains, certifies and advises the ANA Engineers on construction, facility management, and assured mobility capabilities while supporting the retrograde of Coalition Forces through expeditionary construction and assured mobility across the CJOA-A."

From January to May 2014, Joint Task Force Sapper's mission in theater was "Joint Task Force Sapper partners with ANA engineers to enable their independent operations and support the redeployment and retrograde of Coalition Forces through expeditionary construction and deconstruction across the CJOA-A in order to set the conditions for the resolute support mission."

The 130th Engineer Brigade turned over responsibility as Operation Enduring Freedom's Theater Engineer Brigade to the 2nd Engineer Brigade (from Joint Base Elmedorf-Richardson, AK), Joint Task Force Trailblazer, on 29 May 2014. The 130th Engineer Brigade returned to Schofield Barracks, Hawaii from Afghanistan on 4 June 2014.

== Honors ==
=== Unit decorations ===
Ribbon	Award	Year	Notes
Meritorious Unit Commendation ribbon	Meritorious Unit Commendation	2003–2004	For Service in Operation Iraqi Freedom
Meritorious Unit Commendation ribbon	Meritorious Unit Commendation	2005–2006	For Service in Operation Iraqi Freedom
Meritorious Unit Commendation ribbon	Meritorious Unit Commendation	2009–2010	For Service in Operation Iraqi Freedom
Meritorious Unit Commendation ribbon	Meritorious Unit Commendation	2013–2014	For Service in Operation Enduring Freedom
	Superior Unit Award	1995–1996	For Service in Operation Joint Endeavour
	Superior Unit Award	1996–1997	For Service in Operation Joint Endeavour

=== Campaign streamers ===
Conflict	Streamer	Year(s)
World War II	Normandy	1944
World War II	Northern France	1944
World War II	Rhineland	1944–1945
World War II	Ardennes-Alsace	1944–1945
World War II	Central Europe	1945
World War II	Asiatic-Pacific Theater	1945
Iraq War	Operation Iraqi Freedom I	2003–2004
Iraq War	Operation Iraqi Freedom III	2005–2006
Iraq War	Operation Iraqi Freedom	2009–2010
GWOT	Operation Enduring Freedom	2013–2014
