= John W. Morris =

United States Army general

John Woodland Morris II
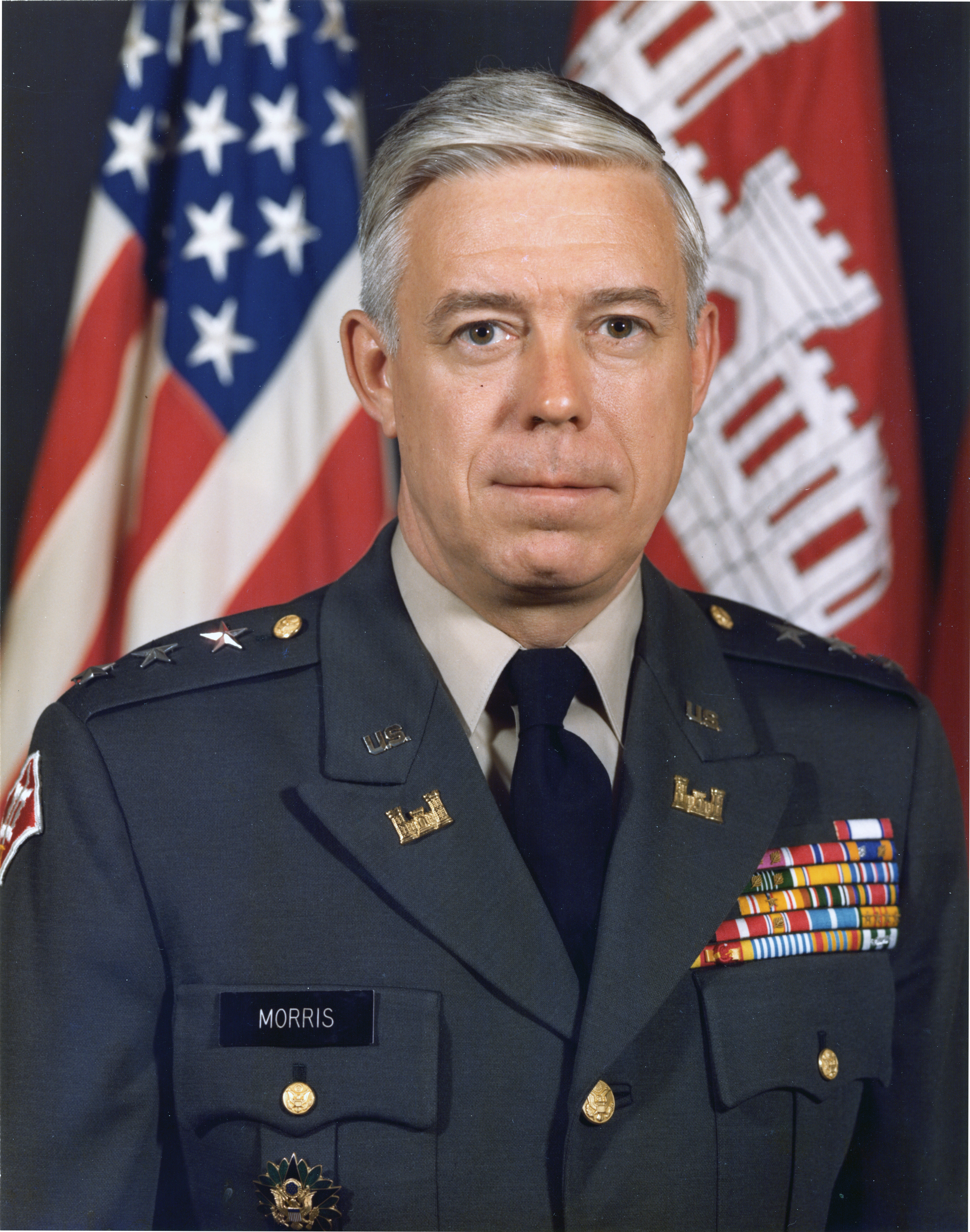
- Born: September 10, 1921; Princess Anne, Maryland
- Died: August 20, 2013 (aged 91); Wilmington, North Carolina
- Military career
- Allegiance: United States
- Branch: United States Army
- Service years: 1943–1980
- Rank: Lieutenant General
- Commands: Chief of Engineers
- Awards: Distinguished Service Medal; Legion of Merit (3 OLC); Silver Star; Defense Meritorious Service Medal

John Woodland Morris (September 10, 1921 – August 20, 2013) was an American lieutenant general who became Chief of Engineers.

Morris was born in Princess Anne, Maryland. He graduated from the United States Military Academy in June 1943 and was commissioned in the Corps of Engineers. During World War II he commanded an airfield construction company in the Western Pacific. After the war he served in the Philippines and Japan, in the Corps' Savannah District, and as area engineer at Goose Bay, Labrador.

In 1960–62 he commanded the divisional 8th Engineer Battalion in Korea. Morris headed the Corps' Tulsa District in 1962–65 as it improved navigation on the Arkansas River. During the peak years of the Vietnam War, he was the Army's Deputy Chief of Legislative Liaison (1967–69), and he commanded the 18th Engineer Brigade in Vietnam (1969–70). He was then Missouri River Division Engineer for two years, the Corps' Director of Civil Works for three years, and Deputy Chief of Engineers in 1975–76. As Chief of Engineers, Morris convinced the Army to include the Corps of Engineers among its major commands. Morris obtained a master's degree in civil engineering from the University of Iowa. He died in 2013, aged 91.

== Awards and decorations ==
His military awards included the Distinguished Service Medal, the Legion of Merit with three Oak Leaf Clusters, the Bronze Star and the Defense Meritorious Service Medal. General Morris was selected Construction's Man of the Year for 1977 by the Engineering News-Record for his work to oversee $17 billion in construction in Saudi Arabia. In 1996, he received the Carroll H. Dunn Award of Excellence from the Construction Industry Institute.

- Army Distinguished Service Medal
- Legion of Merit with three oak leaf clusters
- Bronze Star
- Defense Meritorious Service Medal

Military offices
Preceded by William C. Gribble, Jr.	Chief of Engineers; 1976—1980	Succeeded by Joseph K. Bratton
