= 18th Engineer Brigade =

- 18th Engineer Brigade shoulder sleeve insignia
- Active: 29 July 1921 – 1 June 1946; 15 June 1947 – 16 March 1949; 25 October 1954 – 26 March 1963; 16 July 1965 – 20 September 1971; 21 October 1977 – 15 October 1992; 6 June 2004 – 16 May 2014
- Branch: United States Army
- Type: Combat Engineer Brigade
- Role: Combat Engineers
- Size: Brigade
- Part of: 21st Sustainment Command (Theater)
- Motto: ESSAYONS ET EDIFIONS
- Engagements: World War II; Vietnam War; Operation Desert Storm; Operation Enduring Freedom

Commanders
- Commander: COL Scott A. Petersen
- Command Sergeant Major: CSM Lauro F. Obeada
- Notable commanders: John W. Morris; Walter K. Wilson Jr.; Joe N. Ballard

Insignia
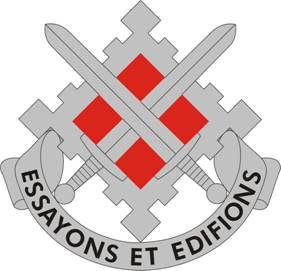
- Distinctive Unit Insignia

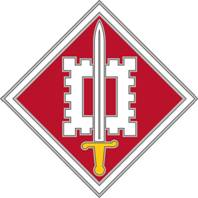
- Combat Service Identification Badge

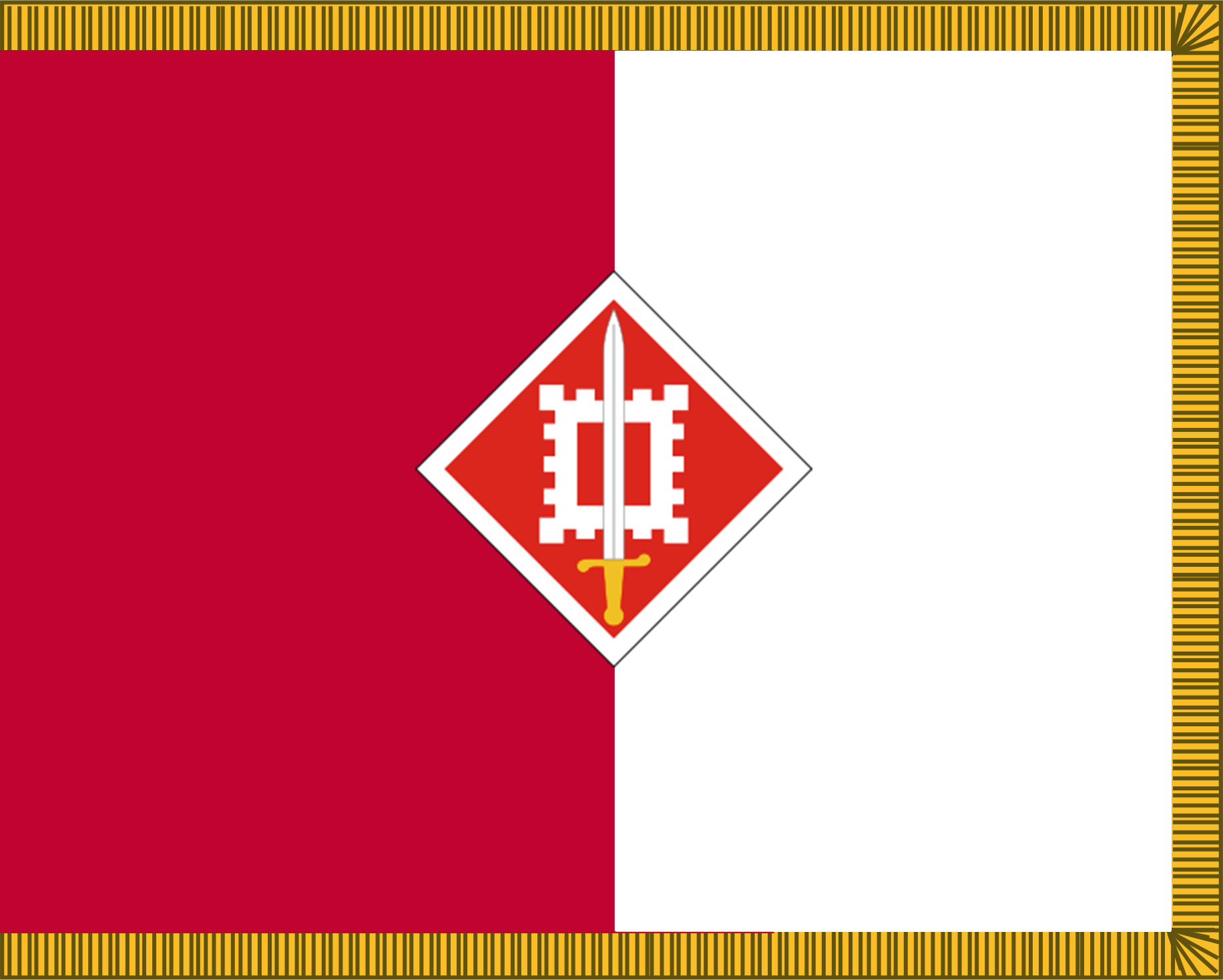
- 18th Engineer Brigade Flag

The 18th Engineer Brigade (Theater Army) was an engineer brigade of the United States Army. It was a subordinate unit of 21st Sustainment Command (Theater) and was last headquartered at Conn Barracks in Schweinfurt, Germany. Soldiers of the 18th Engineer Brigade provided various supportive duties to other Army units, including construction, engineering, and mechanical work on other Army projects. On 16 May 2014, the 18th Engineer Brigade was inactivated in Schweinfurt, Germany.

The brigade served in Europe during World War II, a fact which was included on its Distinctive Unit Insignia when the 20th Engineer Brigade received one on 10 February 1966. The four corners of the crenelated square allude to their four campaigns in World War II, Normandy, Northern France, Rhineland and Central Europe.

The 18th Engineer Brigade later deployed to South Vietnam, during the Vietnam War, where its battalions saw six years of combat service and supported fourteen campaigns, building infrastructure for both military and civilian projects. The brigade participated in a massive number of road construction projects and airfield constructions, supporting numerous infantry units and operating all over Vietnam. After serving in Vietnam, the brigade became attached to Seventh United States Army. It has since undertaken and completed numerous projects in support of US Army, Europe, and participated in Operation Desert Storm, Operation Enduring Freedom, and Operation Iraqi Freedom.

== Organization ==
The US Army's 18th Engineer Brigade is a subordinate unit of 21st Sustainment Command (Theater). The brigade has been assigned to Europe since February 2007. The brigade is headquartered at Conn Barracks in Schweinfurt, Germany. The brigade's current commander is Colonel Scott A. Petersen, while its Command Sergeant Major is Lauro F. Obeada.

In addition to the brigade's Headquarters and Headquarters Company and the 243rd Engineer Detachment (Construction Management), which is located in Grafenwhoer, Germany, two subordinate engineer battalions are permanently attached: the 15th Engineer Battalion headquartered at Grafenwöhr, Germany, and the 54th Engineer Battalion headquartered at Bamberg, Germany.

== History ==
=== World Wars ===
The lineage of the 18th Engineer Brigade can be traced to 29 July 1921, when its predecessor, the 347th Engineers (General Service), was constituted as an Organized Reserves unit. The 347th Engineers would not be activated for almost twenty years, until the military buildup after the United States entered World War II. The unit was ordered into active military service on 6 May 1942 at Camp Claiborne, Louisiana.

On 1 August 1942, the unit was reorganized and re-designated as the 347th Engineer General Services Regiment. The Regiment deployed to England in February 1944. It entered combat in France on 29 June 1944 and participated in the Normandy, Northern France, Rhineland and Central Europe campaigns of World War II, earning its first Meritorious Unit Commendation. After V-E Day, the regiment remained on occupation duty in Germany until its inactivation on 1 June 1946.

On 15 June 1947, the regiment was reactivated in the organized reserves headquartered in Salt Lake, Utah, and remained there until it was again inactivated on 16 March 1949. On 25 October 1954, the 347th Engineer General Services Regiment was re-designated the 18th Engineer Brigade for the first time and activated as a Regular Army unit at Fort Leonard Wood, Missouri, where it remained until inactivation on 26 March 1963.

=== Vietnam War ===
The 18th Engineer Brigade was reactivated on 16 July 1965 at Fort Bragg, N.C. and prepared for deployment to South Vietnam. The 18th Engineer Brigade entered South Vietnam in September 1965 with the responsibility for overseeing all Army engineering operations in Vietnam until the establishment of the U.S. Army Engineer Command, Vietnam, in late 1966.

Under the command of Colonel C. Craig Cannon, the Brigade prepared for deployment to Vietnam. The advance party of the 18th Engineer Brigade arrived at Saigon's Tan Son Nhut Air Base on 3 September 1965. Three days later, Brigadier general Robert R. Ploger assumed command of the Brigade. Within two weeks, the Brigade Headquarters at Tan Son Nhut was fully operational. It had been preceded by the 35th Engineer Group, which built Cam Ranh Bay on a peninsula of sand and in a hostile environment. The brigade assumed responsibility for I Corps and II Corps in the northern part of South Vietnam. The 937th Engineer Group (Combat) at Qui Nhơn was assigned to the Brigade in June 1966.

Its initial activities centered around rapid development of the port facilities, ammunition dumps, base camps and airfields necessary to support the build-up of US combat forces deploying to Vietnam. During the initial construction phases its combat engineer battalions also provided support for search and destroy missions and defensive operations with the 101st Airborne Division near Ninh Hoa and the 4th Infantry Division at Pleiku.

On 18 January 1969, an ammunition storage area was completed at Cam Ranh Bay. It had taken two years to build this complex, which covered over 191,700 square feet (17,810 m^{2}). Landing Zone English was completed on 21 March 1969 near Qui Nhơn. The runway was 3,600 feet (1,100 m) long, 60 feet (18 m) wide, and included a 150—foot by 150—foot turn around area.

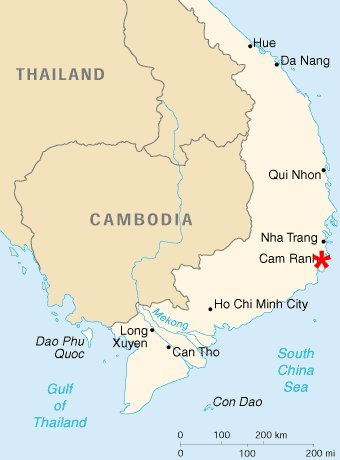
Cam Ranh Bay

On 3 May 1969, Brigadier general John W. Morris assumed command of the Brigade. Soon afterwards, Brigade engineers finished construction of a cold storage warehouse at the Qui Nhơn Support Command, the first of its kind in Vietnam. Construction of the Tandem Switch Building at Vung Chau Mountain was also completed about this time. This 4,000-square-foot (370 m^{2}) building housed almost US$1 million of communications equipment. During the summer months of 1969, Brigade engineers completed the 200,000-barrel (32,000 m^{3}) capacity Air Force tank farm at Cam Ranh Bay, after laying over 12,000 feet (3,700 m) of pipe to complete the project.

The beginning of 1970 saw the initiation of the Brigade's Operation Last Chance, a program of command emphasis and organization for motivation and success of that year's engineer operations. The goals of the program were to maintain primary missions of the combat support as well as insure the completion of the many projects planned for the 1970 construction operations.

February 1970 saw the completion of a project begun in the summer of the previous year at Qui Nhơn that replaced a temporary floating steel dock with a more permanent structure which could accommodate six ammo barges at once. The port of Qui Nhơn became one of the few supply points where ammunition for the First and Second Military Regions could be handled in bulk quantities simultaneously. Prior to the completion of this new facility, the handling of ammunition there had to take place in other areas, near public housing and fuel storage depots.

On 3 May 1970, Brigadier general Henry C. Schrader assumed command of the Brigade. Shortly after this, the most difficult stretch of the roadway that the Brigade had ever undertaken—the 27-kilometer stretch of National Highway QL-11 South in the Central Highlands region known as Tây Nguyên, commonly referred to as the "Good View Pass", was completed. This road had been carved out from a dangerous mountain pass to a national road in less than one year.

The Lines of Communication Program, which represented the most significant contribution that the 18th Engineer Brigade had made to the economic growth of Vietnam, consisted of about 1,500 kilometers of road upgrade from 1967 to 1972. After a slow start in the beginning of this work, the Brigade finished some 560 kilometers of highway reconstruction, and improvement in 1970 and another 450 kilometers were scheduled for completion in 1971 by Brigade units.

In conjunction with the Brigade efforts on the Lines of Communication Program, Brigade engineers were involved in a program of affiliation with Army of the Republic of Vietnam (ARVN) engineers. In addition to continuous training programs which the Brigade established to train ARVN equipment operators, the engineers provided technical assistance and logistical support to several projects undertaken by the ARVN, most notably in the construction of the 3,600-foot (1,100 m) bridge at Tuy Hòa. Upon its completion and opening on 13 February 1971, this bridge became the longest overpass of its type ever constructed in South Vietnam. It would be one of 77 such bridges that the Brigade would construct in the country.

In support of the XXIV Corps, the 18th Brigade mounted what was described as the "most ambitious engineering effort in Vietnam" at the end of January 1971. Brigade engineers pushed a roadway across the rugged terrain of the northern Quảng Trị Province to the Laotian border and constructed a 3,200-foot (980 m) by 60-foot (18 m) airfield in little more than a month at Khe Sanh Combat Base. This construction effort was part of Operation Dewey Canyon II.

On 20 September 1971 the Brigade was inactivated. Over the six years that it served in Vietnam, the 18th Engineer Brigade was involved in 14 of 17 campaigns, earning four Meritorious Unit Commendations.

=== Post Vietnam ===
On 21 October 1977 the 18th Engineer Brigade was reactivated at Karlsruhe, Germany. For 15 years, the Brigade served as the principal construction brigade for the United States Army, Europe and 7th Army. During this period, the Brigade performed numerous construction, rehabilitation and renovation missions in military communities and training areas of the 7th Army. These included an extensive range upgrade of the Grafenwohr Major Training Area in the early 1980s and the construction of the Range 23 complex at the Wildflecken Major Training Area in 1989 and 1990. Additionally, the Brigade was responsible for providing topographic support to the European Theater.

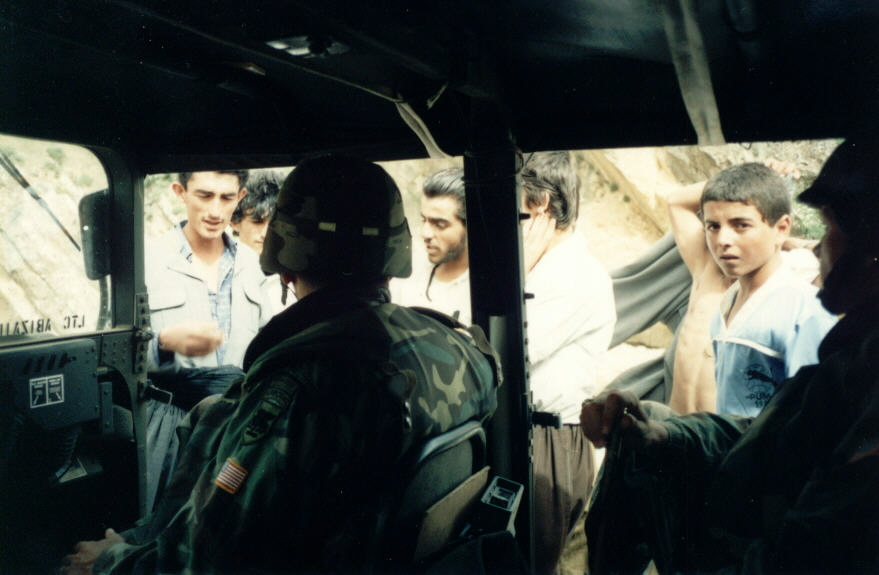
A soldier speaks to civilians during Operation Provide Comfort. The Brigade undertook missions similar to this one.

In 1990 and 1991, during Operation Desert Shield and Operation Desert Storm, the 18th Engineer Brigade provided rail and sea deployment support to the VII Corps and, in addition, deployed a Combat Heavy Battalion and Topographic Company to support VII Corps operations in Southwest Asia. In April 1991, the Brigade Headquarters, along with elements of the 94th Engineer Battalion (Combat) (Heavy), deployed to Zakho, Iraq in support of Operation Provide Comfort. While there, the Brigade coordinated all engineer efforts of a Joint and Combined engineer force providing construction and relief support to the Kurdish refugees. The 18th Engineer Brigade was awarded the Joint Meritorious Unit Award for its action during Operation Provide Comfort. As part of the reduction of forces in Europe, the Brigade was inactivated on 15 October 1992.

=== Present day ===
On 18 October 2002 the Vice Chief of Staff of the Army approved the USAREUR and 7th Army Concept Plan to activate the Theater Army Engineer Brigade (TAEB). Today, the 18th Engineer Brigade (Theater Army) marks the return to service of the only active duty TAEB. The unit was officially reactivated on 6 June 2004.

==== Operation Enduring Freedom ====
The 18th Engineer Brigade was deployed to Afghanistan in support of Operation Enduring Freedom in April 2005. Its primary areas of operation were in and around Bagram, Kandahar, and Sharana, among other locations.

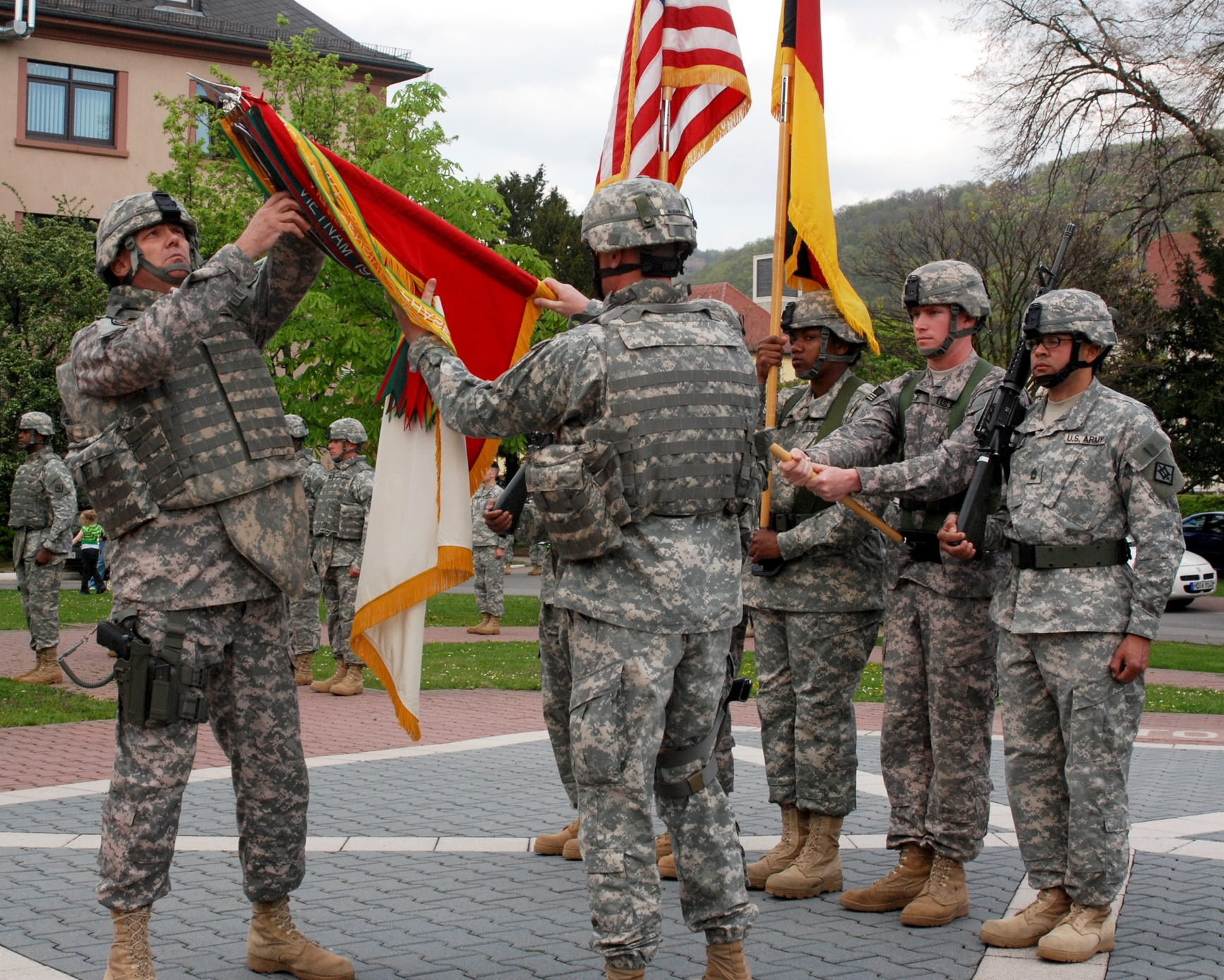
The unit cases its colors in preparation for deployment to Iraq, 29 April 2008.

In 2007, the 18th Engineer Brigade was reassigned to V Corps, taking the place of the 130th Engineer Brigade, which returned to the United States. Some of the 130th's units either merged or were reassigned to the 18th Brigade. During this time, the unit participated in road work, construction of Forward Operating Bases, and other activities that enhanced training readiness in and around Campbell Barracks.

==== Operation Iraqi Freedom 08–10 ====
In 2008, the unit was notified of another upcoming deployment to Iraq in support of Operation Iraqi Freedom. It commands three to five engineer battalions in Multinational Division – North. The battalions support individual Brigade Combat Teams of other units in "Task Force Iron", a combat group led by the 1st Armored Division. They are working to rebuild Iraqi infrastructure, with the cooperation of Iraqi engineers, including construction of roads, airfields, and land moving. The unit cased its colors on 29 April 2008, formally signifying the beginning of its deployment to Iraq.

The Brigade spent the first six months of its deployment to Tikrit in central Iraq, working on projects there for Multinational Division-Center under the 10th Mountain Division. On 6 November, the brigade relocated to Kirkuk, unfurling its colors at Forward Operating Base Warrior. The brigade conducted route clearance and construction projects in northern Iraq, while partnered with Iraqi engineers. It replaced the 1st Brigade Combat Team, 10th Mountain Division in Kirkuk and will was under the area of responsibility of Multinational Division-North led by the 1st Armored Division. In February 2009, the brigade again moved, this time to Nineveh Governorate to focus on construction projects in areas in and around Mosul. It was relieved by 2nd Brigade Combat Team, 1st Cavalry Division. On 17 July 2009, the brigade handed over responsibility of Mosul to the 130th Engineer Brigade. The brigade subsequently returned to Schwetzingen, Germany after its 15-month deployment was finished.

==== Operation Enduring Freedom ====
The Brigade deployed to Afghanistan for its second deployment to the country since 2001.

== Honors ==
=== Unit decorations ===
Ribbon	Award	Year	Notes
	Meritorious Unit Commendation (Army)	1945	for service in the European Theater
	Meritorious Unit Commendation (Army)	1967–1968	for service in Vietnam
	Meritorious Unit Commendation (Army)	1968–1969	for service in Vietnam
	Meritorious Unit Commendation (Army)	1969–1970	for service in Vietnam
	Meritorious Unit Commendation (Army)	1970–1971	for service in Vietnam
	Republic of Vietnam Civil Action Honor Medal, First Class	1970–1971	for service in Vietnam
	Joint Meritorious Unit Award	1991	For participation in Operation Provide Comfort
	Meritorious Unit Commendation (Army)	2005–2006	For participation in Operation Enduring Freedom
	Meritorious Unit Commendation (Army)	2008–2009	For participation in Operation Iraqi Freedom

=== Campaign streamers ===
Conflict	Streamer	Year(s)
World War II	Normandy Campaign	1945
World War II	Northern France Campaign	1945
World War II	Rhineland Campaign	1945
World War II	Central Europe Campaign	1945
Vietnam War	Vietnam Defense	1965
Vietnam War	Counteroffensive, Phase I	1965–1966
Vietnam War	Counteroffensive, Phase II	1966–1967
Vietnam War	Counteroffensive, Phase III	1967–1968
Vietnam War	Tet Counteroffensive	1968
Vietnam War	Counteroffensive, Phase IV	1968
Vietnam War	Counteroffensive, Phase V	1968
Vietnam War	Counteroffensive, Phase VI	1968–1969
Vietnam War	Tet 69/Counteroffensive	1969
Vietnam War	Summer–Fall 1969	1969
Vietnam War	Winter–Spring 1970	1970
Vietnam War	Sanctuary Counteroffensive	1970
Vietnam War	Counteroffensive, Phase VII	1970–1971
Operation Enduring Freedom	Afghanistan	2005–2006
Operation Iraqi Freedom	Iraqi Campaign, Iraqi Surge, Iraqi Campaign, Iraqi Sovereignty	2008–2009

== Notable soldiers ==
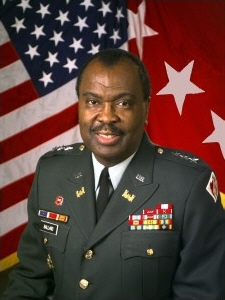
LTG Joe N. Ballard, one of three former Commanders of the 18th Engineer Brigade who later became the Chief of Engineers.

Three soldiers from the 18th Engineer Brigade have gone on to serve as Chief of Engineers, the head of the US Army's Corps of Engineers. This is the highest number to come from a single engineer brigade. These three are Lieutenant Generals Joe N. Ballard, John W. Morris, and Walter K. Wilson Jr. In addition to commanding the brigade from 1987 to 1990, while it was stationed outside of Karlsruhe in Germany, LTG Ballard had also commanded a company in one of the brigade's subordinate battalions, the 864th Engineer Battalion, during its earlier years in Vietnam.
