= 65th Division Engineer Battalion =

US Army unit

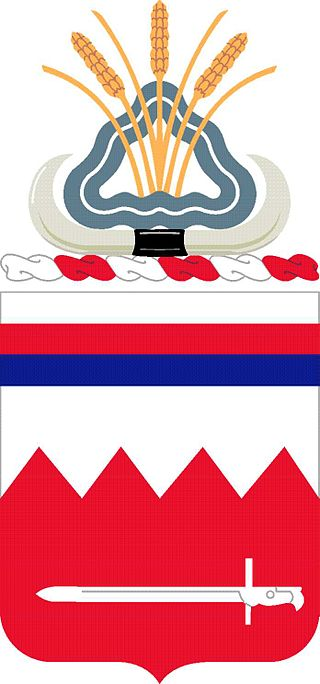
- Coat of arms
- Active: 1927 – present
- Country: United States
- Branch: United States Army
- Type: Combat engineer
- Size: Battalion
- Garrison/HQ: Schofield Barracks, Wahiawa, Hawaii
- Nickname: Bayonets
- Mottos: "First In, Last Out"
- Colors: Scarlet & White
- Engagements: World War II; Korean War; Vietnam War; Operation Uphold Democracy; Operation Joint Forge; Operation Iraqi Freedom; Operation Enduring Freedom
- Decorations: Meritorious Unit Commendation (4): Korea; Vietnam; Iraq; Pacific Theater (HHC); Army Superior Unit Award (2): 1992–1993; 1999–2000; Valorous Unit Award (5): Tay Ninh Province (A Co); Cu Chi District (B Co, C Co); Binh Duong Province (B Co); Quang Ngai Province (D Co); Presidential Unit Citation (6): Luzon (A Co, B Co, C Co); Sangnyong (A Co); Nam River (B Co); Taegu (C Co); Philippine Presidential Unit Citation: 17 October 1944 – 4 July 1945; Republic of Korea Presidential Unit Citation (2): Mansan-Chinju; Munsan-Ni; Republic of Vietnam Cross of Gallantry with Palm (3): 1966–1968; 1968–1970; Vietnam 1970 (E Co); Republic of Vietnam Civil Action Honor Medal, First Class: 1966–1970

Commanders
- Current commander: LTC Brett D. Fuller
- Command Sergeant Major: CSM Zachary T. Moore

Insignia
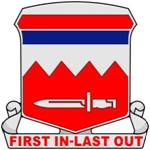
- Distinctive Unit Insignia

The 65th Division Engineer Battalion ("Bayonets") is a light maneuver support combat engineer battalion of the United States Army. Throughout the years, the 65th Division Engineer Battalion (65th DEB) has undergone numerous reorganizations and has participated in World War II, the Korean War, the Vietnam War, Operation Uphold Democracy, the NATO intervention in Bosnia and Herzegovina as part of Stabilization Force in Operation Joint Guard, Operation Iraqi Freedom, and Operation Enduring Freedom.

Consisting of the 60th Combat Engineer Company – Infantry, the 77th Combat Engineer Company – Infantry, the 538th Engineer Support Company, a Forward Support Company, and a Headquarters and Headquarters Company, the 65th DEB is currently assigned to the 25th Division Sustainment Brigade, 25th Infantry Division based out of Schofield Barracks, Hawaii. They typically conduct engineer operations within the Asia-Pacific region under the direction of United States Army Pacific (USARPAC) with an emphasis on training with partner forces, to include the Republic of China Army, the Philippine Army, the Indonesian Army, the Malaysian Army, and the Australian Army.

== Mission ==
65th Division Engineer Battalion provides ready engineer forces and a warfighting headquarters to deliver effects for the 25th Infantry Division in order to deter adversaries in the Asia-Pacific area of responsibility. On order, 65th Division Engineer Battalion enables 25th Infantry Division to fight and win in large-scale combat operations.

== History ==
=== Lineage ===
The 65th Division Engineer Battalion was first constituted into the Regular Army as the 65th Engineer Battalion on 18 October 1927. The unit was inactive and remained inactive for 14 years. On 1 October 1941, the Hawaiian Division was split into the 24th and 25th Infantry divisions. The 65th Engineer Battalion was assigned to the 25th Infantry Division (25th ID), and was activated. Soon after, the Japanese launched their attack on Pearl Harbor, and the 65th was called to service during World War II. On 1 January 1944, the 65th was reorganized, designated as the 65th Engineer Combat Battalion. After the war, it deployed to Japan to assist in occupation duties for the next five years.

The battalion was then engaged in the Korean War during 1950–1954. In 1954, the unit finally returned home to Schofield Barracks after more than 12 years overseas. On 1 March 1954, the battalion was reorganized and once again designated as the 65th Engineer Battalion. In 1965, the battalion deployed to the Republic of Vietnam and did not redeploy home until 8 December 1970. On 15 August 2005, the unit laid down its colors, and was inactivated and reorganized as a Special Troops Battalion under the 3rd Brigade Combat Team.

The 65th was reactivated on 16 July 2007 and assigned to the 8th Military Police Brigade, 8th Theater Sustainment Command as a combat effects battalion. In June 2008, they were then assigned to the 130th Engineer Brigade, 8th Theater Sustainment Command. With the 130th, the unit deployed to Northern Iraq as well as Afghanistan. When they returned to Schofield Barracks, they were assigned to the 2nd Stryker Brigade Combat Team (2SBCT), 25th Infantry Division and designated as a brigade engineer battalion on 16 October 2014. In spring 2016, the 2nd Stryker Brigade Combat Team was relieved of its strykers and organized into its current status as a (light) infantry brigade combat team.

=== World War II ===
The 65th Brigade Engineer Battalion's first mission was to improve defenses in Oahu. Their main areas of concern were the beaches and trails in the southern region. They first saw action on 7 December 1941 during the attack on Pearl Harbor. They were then swiftly deployed to Guadalcanal in the Solomon Islands to participate in the Guadalcanal Campaign.

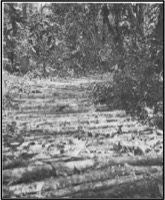
Charlie Company, 65th Brigade Engineer Battalion used coconut trees to construct a Corduroy Road in New Georgia during World War II. The road is capable of supporting 155 mm howitzers.

The Japanese held strong defensive fortifications on Mount Austen as well as on two nearby ridges: Seahorse and Galloping Horse. Offensive operations to capture the three locations began on 7 January 1943. Despite the fact that the 65th Engineer Battalion was poorly equipped, they aided in the seizure of the key terrain by opening roads and maintaining lines of communication. They also opened up supply routes to the interior by dredging the Matanikau River allowing free movement for boats. In January 1943 XIV Corps went on the offensive. As XIV Corps moved into the Northern Solomons, New Georgia, Vella LaVella, Sasavele, and Kolombangara, the 65th Engineer Battalion continued to support freedom of maneuver and facilitate resupply routes by improving roads and trails and building bridges and fording sites.

On 11 January 1945, the 65th landed on Luzon in continued support of the 25th ID who was then assigned to the Sixth Army. The unit faced continuous fierce ground combat and was removed on 30 June 1945. At the end of WWII, the 65th Engineer Battalion received 4 campaign streamers: Central Pacific, Guadalcanal, Northern Solomons, and Luzon. Alpha, Bravo, and Charlie Companies each also earned a Presidential Unit Citation for Gallantry on Luzon. The 65th was then deployed to Japan with the 25th ID in order to assist in occupation duties.

=== Korean War ===
In 1950, the 65th deployed straight from Japan to the Republic of Korea. During the Korean War, the unit conducted similar missions as they had in World War II. Their duties consisted of mine/booby trap clearing, obstacle reducing/building, road and trail improvements, and bridge building.

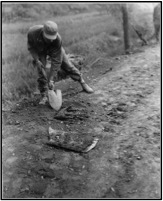
A soldier from the 77th Engineer Company, as a part of the 65th DEB, prepares to remove a mine with a shovel on 15 September 1950.

They assisted the 25th ID throughout the entirety of the war, participating in all ten campaigns: UN Defensive, UN Offensive, CCF Intervention, First UN Counteroffensive, CCF Spring Offensive, UN Summer-Fall Offensive, Second Korean Winter, Korea Summer-Fall 1952, Third Korean Winter, and Korea Summer 1953. In addition to the battalion receiving streamers for campaign participation, Alpha, Bravo, and Charlie Companies also received Presidential Unit Citations. Alpha Company received the award for assisting the 27th Infantry Regiment ("Wolfhounds") in defending the Pusan Perimeter. Bravo Company earned it while aiding the 35th Infantry Regiment in their stand at the Nam River. Charlie Company obtained the citation for supporting the 25th ID's combat operations near Taegu.

The battalion also received a Meritorious Unit Commendation and two Republic of Korea Presidential Unit Citations. By the time the 65th returned home to Schofield Barracks from participating in WWII and the Korean War, they had spent 800 days in direct support of combat operations and 12 years overseas.

=== Vietnam War and the post-Cold War era ===
The 65th was deployed to Vietnam in 1965 and spent six years supporting the 25th Infantry Division. One of the main assignments during the Vietnam War was jungle clearing operations near the 25th Division's Cu Chi, Dau Tieng and Tay Ninh base camps. During this time it gained 12 campaign credits before returning to the United States in 1971, arriving at Oahu, Hawaii. Between 1972 and 1986 the unit served as a divisional engineer unit, before being converted into a light engineering battalion. In 2002, the battalion deployed 80 personnel to Bosnia in support of the 25th Infantry Division. After this, it was inactivated in 2005 as the 25th Infantry Division was reorganized along modular lines. The battalion was reactivated as part of the 130th Engineer Brigade in Hawaii in 2008. With this formation, the unit deployed to both Iraq and Afghanistan under Operation Iraqi Freedom and Operation Enduring Freedom. In February of 2024, in accordance with the Army Force Structure Transformation Initiative, the 65th was reorganized from a Brigade Engineer Battalion to a Division Engineer Battalion (DEB). Currently, the 65th DEB is under the organizational control of the 25th Division Sustainment Brigade, 25th Infantry Division.

== Organization ==
The unit consists of five companies:

- Headquarters & Headquarters Company ("Hatchets") (Motto: "Carve the path")
- 60th Combat Engineer Company – Infantry ("Chosen") (Motto: "Death before dishonor")
- 77th Combat Engineer Company – Infantry ("Tunnel Rats") (Motto: "Head first")
- 538th Engineer Support Company ("Outlaws") (Motto: "Rock steady")
- Forward Support Company ("Phoenix") (Motto: "Rise up")
