= 7th Engineer Brigade =

U. S. Army brigade

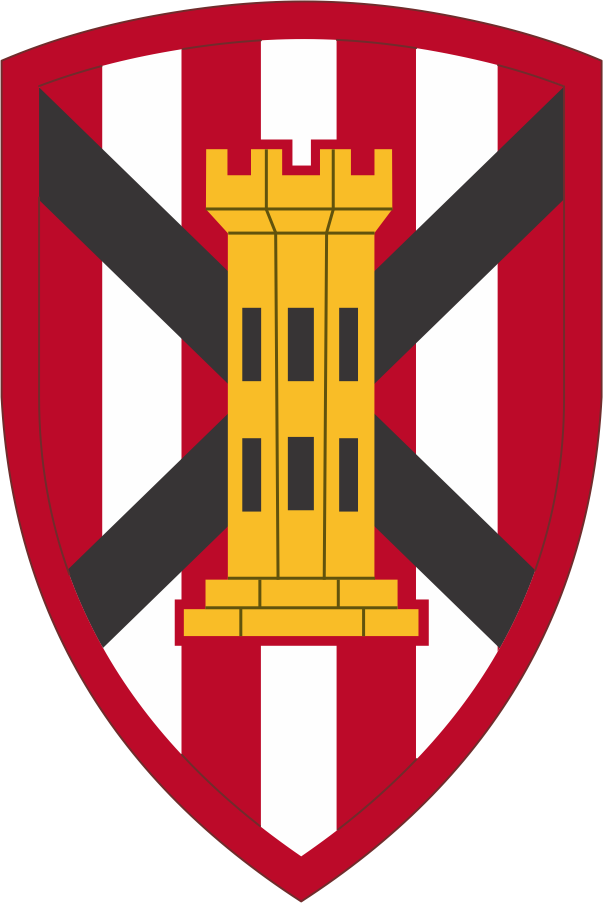
- 7th Engineer Brigade Shoulder Sleeve Insignia (SSI)
- Active: 1948–1992, 2023–present
- Country: United States
- Branch: United States Army
- Type: Combat engineering Engineering
- Size: Brigade
- Part of: 21st Theater Sustainment Command
- Garrison/HQ: Barton Barracks, Ansbach, Germany
- Colors: Scarlet and white
- Website: https://www.21tsc.army.mil/Units/7th-Engineer-Brigade/

Commanders
- Commander: COL James T. Startzell
- Senior Enlisted Advisor: CSM Alex Archilla

Insignia
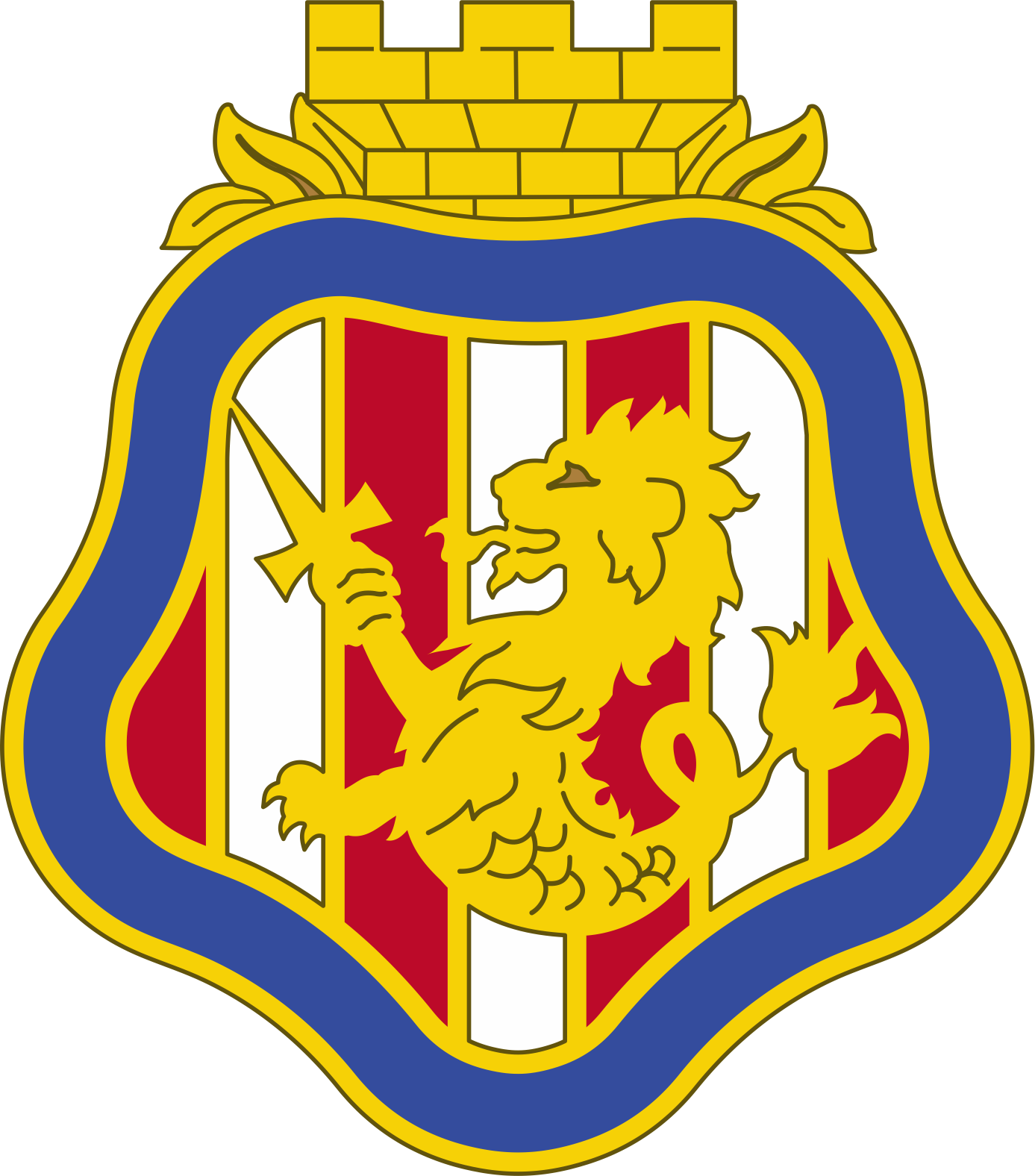
- 7th Engineer Brigade DUI

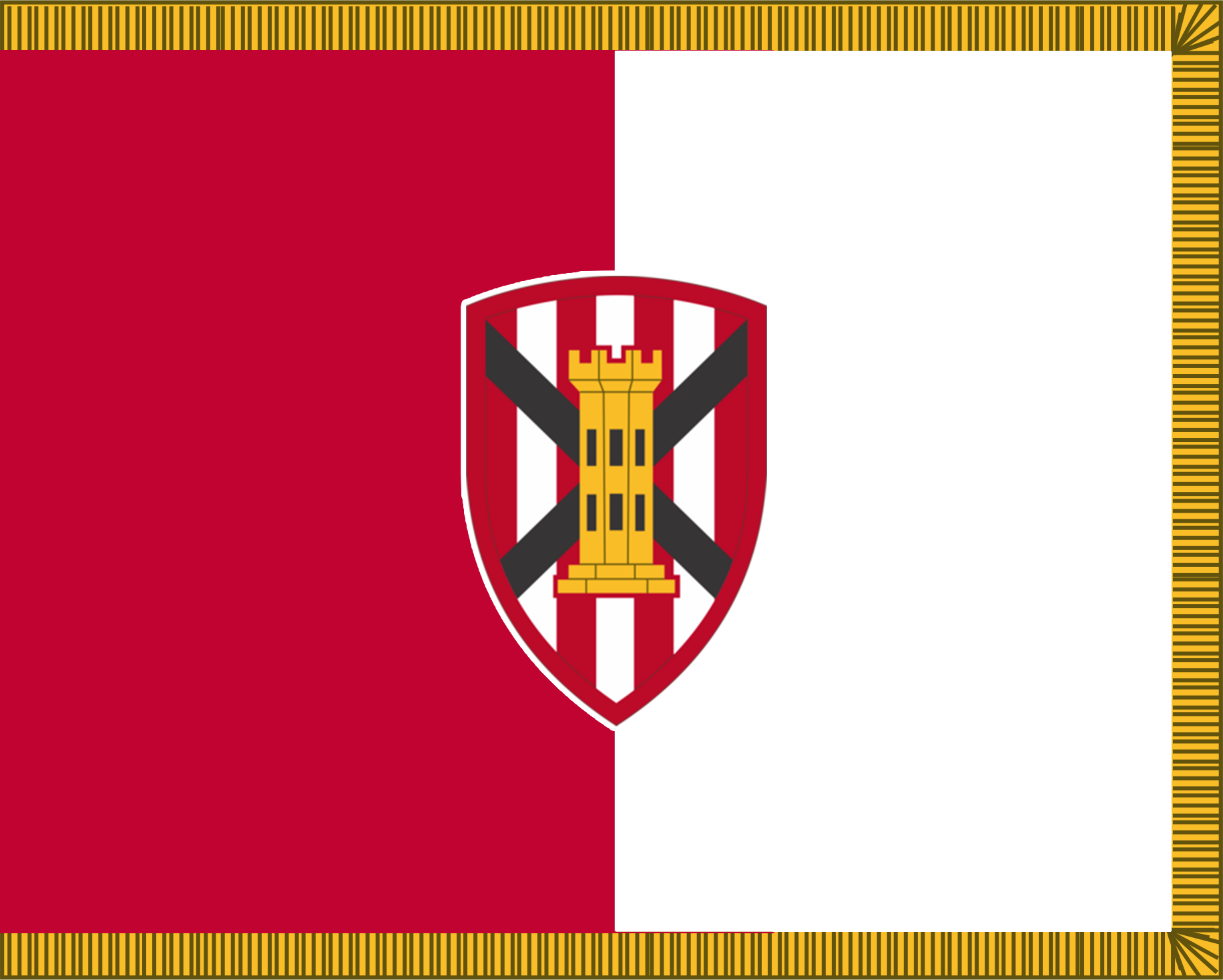
- 7th Engineer Brigade Flag

The 7th Engineer Brigade was active from World War II to its inactivation after Operation Desert Storm. It was reactivated in July 2023 and is located at the Barton Barracks in Ansbach, Germany.

== History ==
The 7th Engineer Brigade of the US Army was formed from the 5202nd Engineer Construction Brigade in June 1944, and was inactivated on 5 December 1945 after completing is duties in Yokohoma, Japan. It was reactivated by the Army at Fort Belvoir, Virginia, in 1948. Starting in 1951, while redesignated as the 7th Engineer Aviation Brigade, the brigade was responsible for all United States Aviation construction in France, Germany, and Italy. Starting in 1956, renamed back to 7th Engineer Brigade, the unit managed construction for NATO, to build up Western Europe from the disaster of World War II.

The 7th Engineer Brigade became a member of the VII Corps on June 14, 1969, relocating to Ludendorff Kaserne, Kornwestheim. The brigade served for many years as the corps engineer formation for the corps.

In the late 1980s the brigade reportedly was made up of headquarters at Kornwestheim; Headquarters and Headquarters Company; 9th Engineer Battalion, Aschaffenburg, (M60 AVLB, M728 Combat Engineer Vehicles, M88 Recovery Vehicles, MAB bridge modules); 78th Engineer Battalion, Ettlingen, (M60 AVLB, M728, M88, MAB bridge modules); 82nd Engineer Battalion, Bamberg, (M60 AVLB, M728, M88, 1MAB bridge modules); and 237th Engineer Battalion, Heilbronn. Three of these engineer battalions may have had a Table of organization and equipment calling for 8x M60 AVLB, 8x M728, four M88s, and 12 MAB bridge modules; while the 237th Engineer Bn. was the only wheeled unit in the brigade, comprised, primarily, of 5 ton dump trucks and other wheeled vehicles. The last of the brigade's battalions was reportedly the 565th Engineer Battalion (Bridge), at Karlsruhe.

7th Engineer Brigade was inactivated in Germany on 22 June 1991. Throughout the early 1990s, the 130th Engineer Brigade and the V Corps would continue to see units come and go from its command as they were transferred from the restructuring 18th Engineer Brigade and the deactivating 7th Engineer Brigade.

The 21st Theater Command has listed on their official site that the 7th Engineer Brigade is going to return to Germany in the summer of 2023. The Stars and Stripes also reported in November 2022 that 7th Engineer Brigade was returning to Germany later in 2023.

== Organization 2026 ==
- 7th Engineer Brigade, in Ansbach
  - 15th Engineer Battalion, in Grafenwöhr
    - Headquarters and Headquarters Company
    - 500th Engineer Company (Combat)
    - 809th Engineer Company (Multi-Role Bridge)
    - 902nd Engineer Company (Construction)
    - Forward Support Company
