= 15th Engineer Battalion (United States) =

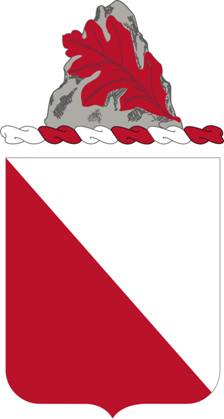
- Coat of Arms
- Active: 1916–1919, 1940–1946, 1948–1962, 1966–1969, 1972–1991, 2008–
- Country: United States
- Branch: US Army Corps of Engineers
- Type: Battalion (Echelon above Brigade)
- Role: Construction Effects
- Size: Battalion
- Part of: 7th Engineer Brigade
- Garrison/HQ: Grafenwoehr
- Motto: Drive On!

Commanders
- Commander: LTC Michael D Wiehagen
- Command Sergeant Major: CSM Sebastian Chrzanowski

Insignia
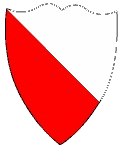
- Distinctive Unit Insignia

The 15th Engineer Battalion is an Echelon above Brigade (EAB) battalion of the United States Army. It is currently a subordinate unit of 7th Engineer Brigade and is headquartered in Grafenwoehr, Germany. Soldiers of the 15th Engineer Battalion provide various supportive duties to other Army units, including construction, engineering, and mechanical work on other Army projects.

== Organization ==
The 15th is composed of four companies. The Headquarters and Headquarters Company (HHC, Wolfpack) contains the command and staff sections, providing planning and coordination for unit missions. The Forward Support Company (FSC, Atlas) provides logistical and maintenance support to the battalion. The 500th Engineer Support Company (ESC, Titans) provide combat support and the 902d Engineer Construction Company (ECC, Gladiators) perform horizontal and limited vertical construction. On 30 July 2024 the 809th Engineer Company (Multi-Role Bridge) was reactivated and assigned to the battalion.

== History ==
The 15th Construction Engineer Battalion has a proud and distinguished lineage. From its auspicious beginnings in the trenches and mud of World War I battlefields of France to the steaming hot jungles of Vietnam, the 15th Engineers maintained their "Drive On!" spirit.

=== World Wars ===
Constituted on 3 June 1916 as the Fifth Reserve Engineers (Regiment) at Oakmont, Pennsylvania. Company D became known as the "Pittsburgh Pioneers." On 8 August 1917, the regiment was redesignated as the 15th Engineers (Regiment)(Railway). CPT later General Brehon B. Somervell assisted in organizing and recruiting the regiment. During World War I, the regiment received battle streamers for the St. Mihiel Battle of Saint-Mihiel and Meuse-Argonne campaigns Meuse-Argonne Offensive. Deployed to France in July 1917, the 15th planned and constructed railroads, and helped build barracks, hospitals, and supply depots during the war. It was the first Engineer Regiment sent to abroad for World War I. The regiment was demobilized at Sherman, Ohio on 15 May 1919.

The 15th Engineers were reconstituted and placed on the inactive rolls on 25 August 1921, followed by assignment to the 9th Infantry Division on 24 March 1923. The unit was redesignated as the 15th Engineer Battalion in July 1940 and activated at Fort Bragg on 1 August. During World War II, the 15th Engineer Combat Battalion first saw action in North Africa in 1943, fighting with the 9th Infantry Division during the Algerian-French Morocco and Tunisian Campaigns. Next, the battalion participated in the invasion of Sicily, hitting the beach at Palermo in August 1943. With Sicily secured, the 9th Infantry Division sailed to England and prepared for the Normandy invasion. Landing at Utah Beach on 10 June 1944, the battalion drove on to Cherbourg and later took part in the St. Lo breakthrough. Fighting its way across France earned the battalion a battle streamer for its role in the Northern France Campaign. In September, the battalion earned the Presidential Unit Citation for its actions on the Siegfried Line. In December 1944, the battalion helped defeat Hitler's forces in the Battle of the Bulge to earn another battle streamer. In March 1945, B company earned the Presidential Unit Citation for its part in seizing the Ludendorf Bridge, crossing the Rhine, and extending the Remagen Bridgehead. After the Rhineland Campaign, the division advanced eastward, fighting through the remnants of Hitler's army to earn a battle streamer for the Central European Campaign. The war's end brought about the 15th's inactivation in November 1946.

=== Korea ===
Although reactivated on 12 July 1948 at Fort Dix, the 15th remained stateside during the Korean War, serving first at Fort Dix, New Jersey, and later at Fort Carson, Colorado, from 1954, until inactivation in January 1962.

=== Vietnam ===
The battalion was reactivated at Fort Riley, Kansas, on 1 February 1966 and later joined American fighting forces in the jungles of Vietnam. The battalion twice earned the Vietnamese Cross of Gallantry with Palm for its outstanding military service and also received a Civil Action Honor Medal, First Class, for numerous civic actions. Alpha and Charlie Companies were recognized for their effective support of the 1st Brigade, 9th Infantry Division in 1968: Alpha Company received the Presidential Unit Citation for its valiant actions in the Dinh-Tuong Province and Charlie Company earned the Vietnamese Cross of Gallantry for its heroic support of highly effective search and destroy operation in the Long-An Province. The battalion rotated to Hawaii in August 1969, where it inactivated.

=== Post Vietnam ===
The 15th Combat Engineer Battalion was reactivated at Fort Lewis, and stationed on North Fort, in June 1972. In 1983, Delta Company was reorganized as a General Support Heavy Engineer Company, and the Bridge Company became Echo Company. On 1 April 1984, Echo Company reorganized to form the 73rd Engineer Company(Assault Ribbon Bridge), I Corps, and attached them to the 15th Combat Engineer Battalion. In 1988 Alpha Company was called to support the fire fighting efforts in Yellowstone National Park Wy. After 3 days of training they were deployed in August 1988 at base camp Madison Junction until the fire was out in September 1988 by the snow. The unit soldiers were awarded, 2 months later, the Humanitarian Service Medal for their efforts. During July and August 1989 the 15th Engineer Battalion conducted firefighting operations in the Wallowa-Whitman National Forest near Baker, Oregon as a part of OPERATION FIREBREAK. Participating soldiers were subsequently awarded the Humanitarian Service Medal. In January 1990, the Army ordered the 9th Infantry Division to inactivate. Charlie Company cased its guidon on 1 October 1990. Delta Company inactivated on 14 February 1991, when it reorganized to form the nucleus of the 102nd Engineer Company, 199th Infantry Brigade (Motorized). Soldiers and equipment from across the battalion were used to fill the new company. The 73rd Engineer Company(ARB), after its three-month combat tour in Operation Desert Storm, returned to I Corps control and was attached to 864th Engineer Battalion until its inactivation in 1994. The remaining companies and the battalion Headquarters inactivated on 1 August 1991.

=== Global War on Terrorism ===
The battalion was reactivated at Conn Barracks on 16 July 2008 as part of the 18th Engineer Brigade, V Corps and provides engineering support to US Army units in Europe. In July 2009, the battalion deployed task-organized elements to conduct construction missions in Bulgaria and Israel. Recent construction missions include a platoon-sized deployment to Romania and the 500th EN CO improving roads on multiple training areas in USAREUR. In late October 2010, the 15th EN BN (292nd EN DET/ OHARNG) conducted a first in decades. It deployed forward to a combat zone. The battalion executed extensive theater construction support missions in the Kuwait AOR and recon assets to the Kingdom of Jordan. As the Theater Reserve Engineer Force, the 15th was charged with providing engineering support across the entire CENTCOM AOR. This placed pressure on the battalion. As the "Drive On" spirit was displayed, Commanders and soldiers alike excelled at forward deploying elements into Afghanistan to provide combat commander construction support. The 15th redeployed to USAREUR in late October 2011 to resume its duties supporting USAREUR and NATO in the training of international forces.

== Honors ==
=== Campaign participation credit ===
World War I: St. Mihiel; Meuse-Argonne

World War II: Algeria-French Morocco; Tunisia; Sicily; Normandy; Northern France; Rhineland; Ardennes-Alsace; Central Europe

Vietnam: Counteroffensive, Phase II; Counteroffensive, Phase III; Tet Counteroffensive; Counteroffensive, Phase IV; Counteroffensive, Phase V; Counteroffensive, Phase VI; Tet 69/Counteroffensive; Summer-Fall 1969;

=== Decorations ===
- Presidential Unit Citation (Army) for SIEGFRIED LINE
- Belgian Fourragere 1940
- Cited in the Order of the Day of the Belgian Army for action at the Meuse River
- Cited in the Order of the Day of the Belgian Army for action in the Ardennes
- Republic of Vietnam Cross of Gallantry with Palm for VIETNAM 1966–1968
- Republic of Vietnam Cross of Gallantry with Palm for VIETNAM 1969
- Republic of Vietnam Civil Action Honor Medal, First Class for VIETNAM 1966–1969

902d Engineer Company Honors

Campaign Participation Credit

World War II: Normandy, Northern France, Rhineland

Decorations

Meritorious Unit Commendation (Army), Streamer embroidered EUROPEAN THEATER
