= Zizhulin Church =

Roman Catholic church in Tianjin, China

Coordinates: 39°07′37″N 117°12′17″E

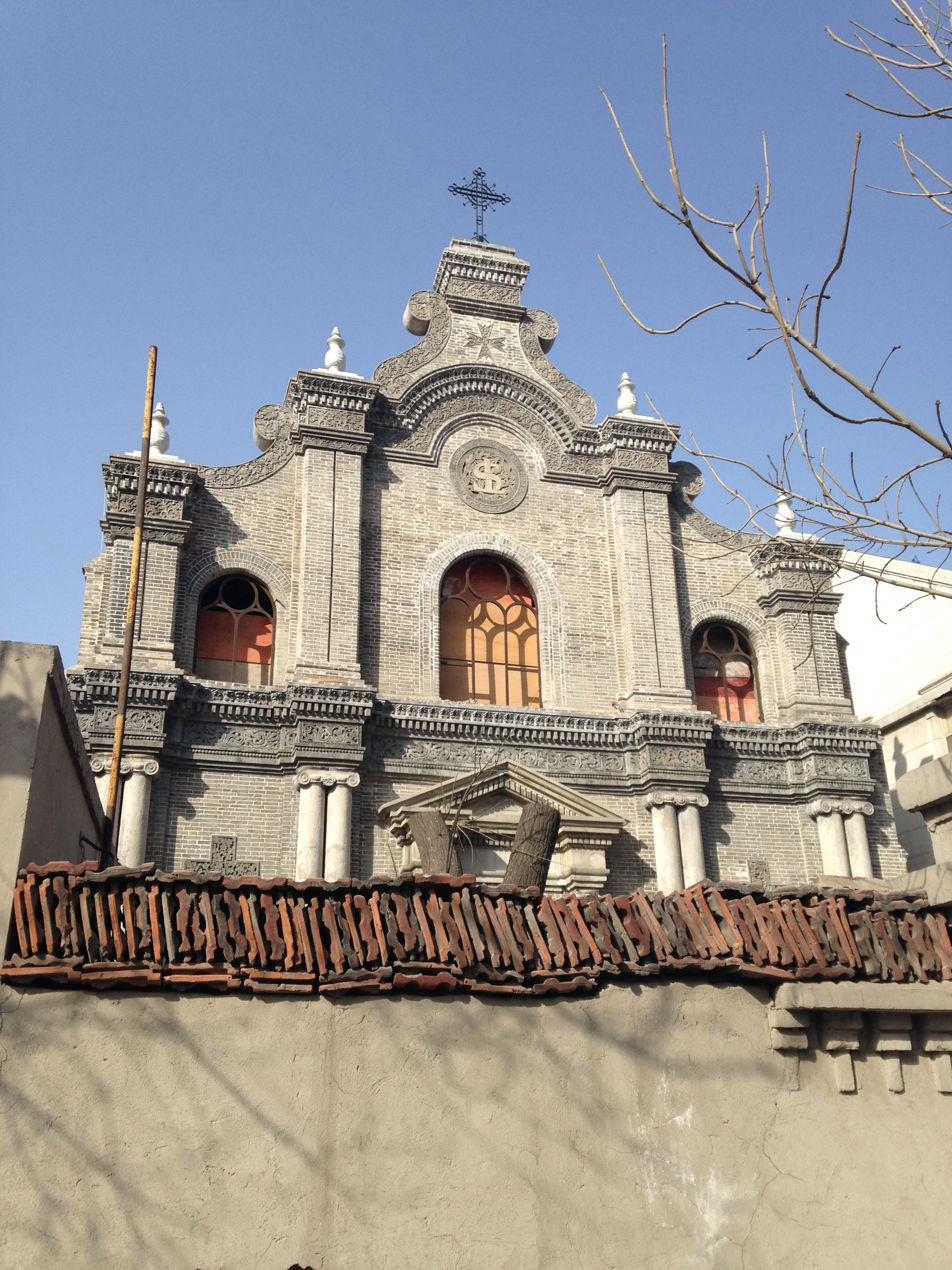
The Church Building Before Restoration

Zizhulin Church (紫竹林教堂) is a Roman Catholic church in Tianjin, China.

== History ==
The Tianjin massacre occurred in 1870 which resulted in the destruction of a number of churches in Tianjin. Following this, foreign Catholics decided to construct a new church within the boundaries of the French concession in Tianjin with reparation funds given by the Qing government. Alphonse Favier established the Zizhulin church devoted to Saint Louis in 1872. Originally it was primarily used for service to foreign Catholics, however, Chinese Catholics also used it.

When the Boxer Rebellion broke out in 1900, many churches in northern China were destroyed, however, Zizhulin church was not affected due to its location within the foreign concession that endured siege and was protected by foreign troops.

The church was closed in 1966 as a result of the universal closing of almost all religious buildings during the Cultural Revolution. In 1996, the building was given by the government back to the Tianjin diocese, however, due to its state of disrepair, it was not re-opened for masses, but rather was used as a residence for nuns.

In 2005, the Tianjin municipal government placed it on the list of historically protected structures in Tianjin. In 2013, it was also placed on the list of culturally protected relics in Tianjin.

In the 2010s, efforts were made with support from the Tianjin municipal government to renovate the church. It was restored and re-opened for public worship on the Feast of Christ the King 2017.

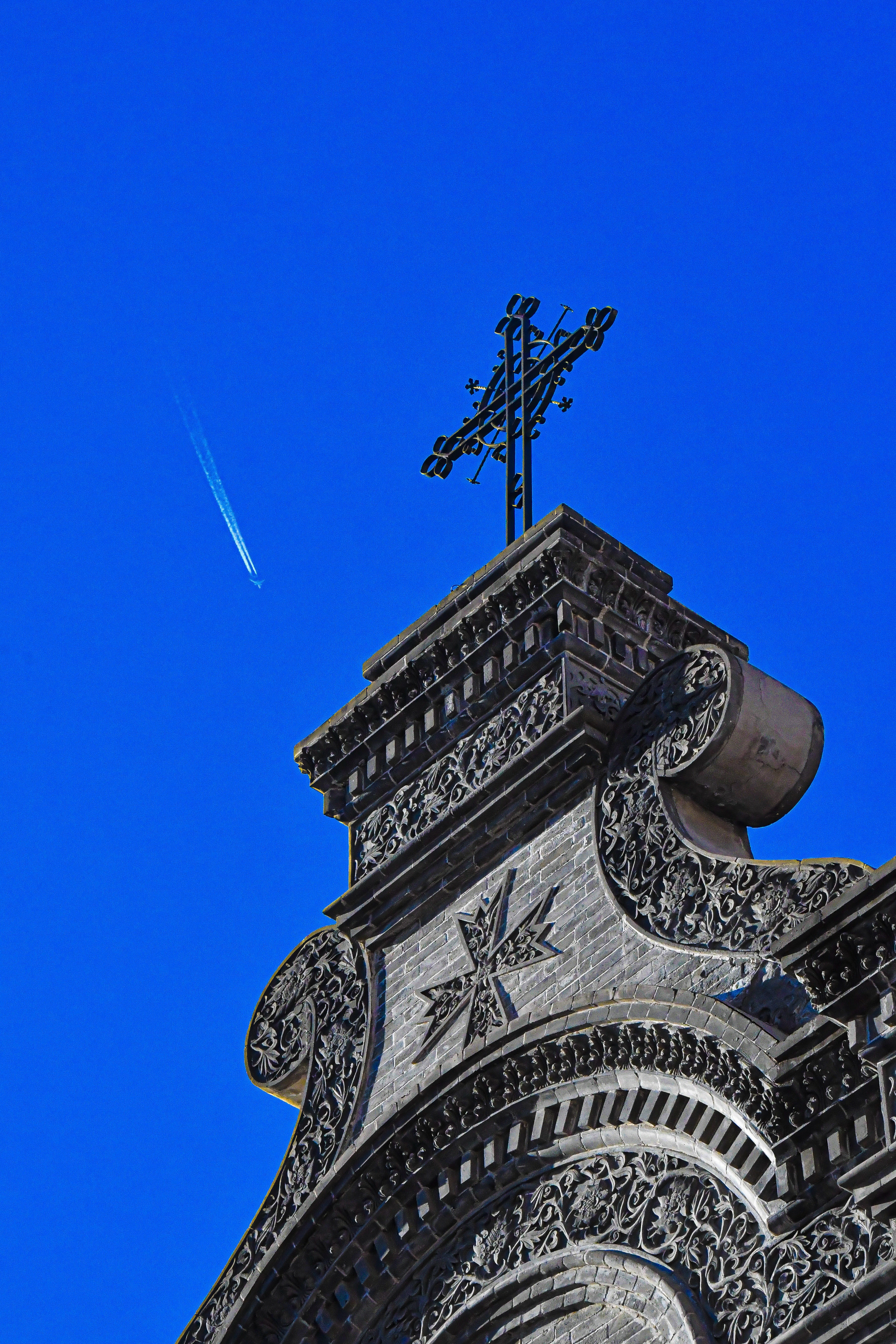
architecture

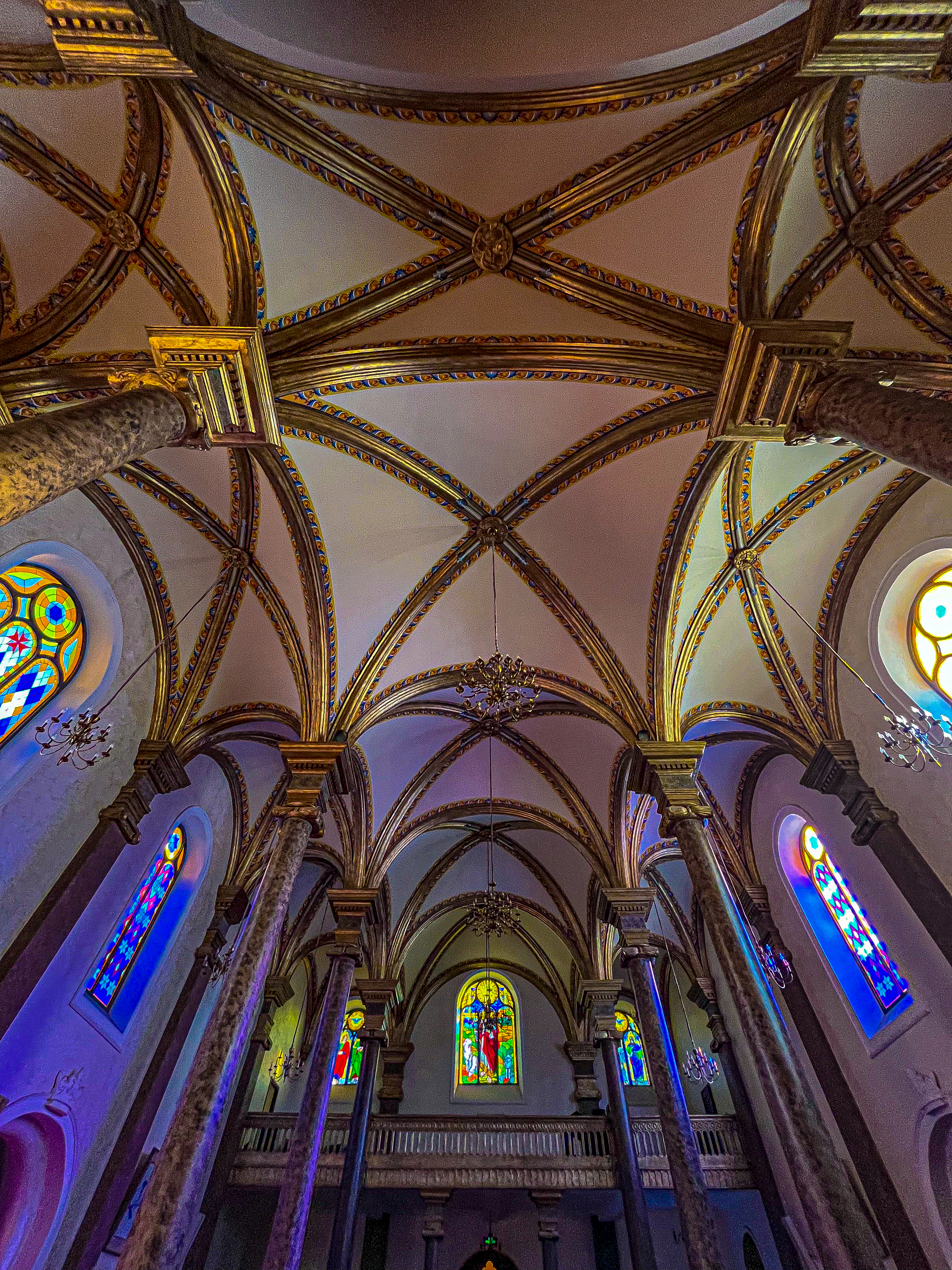
architecture

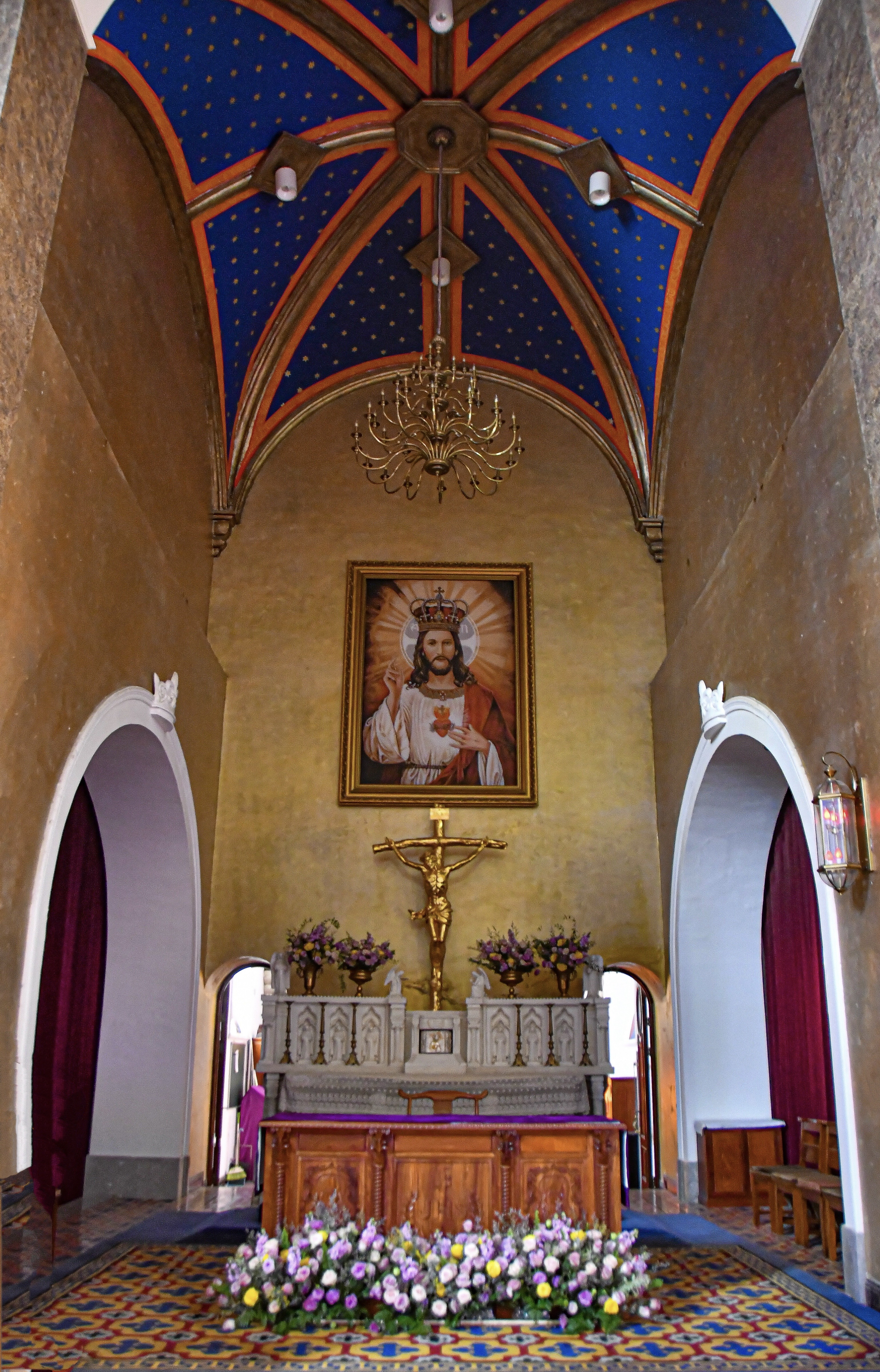
architecture

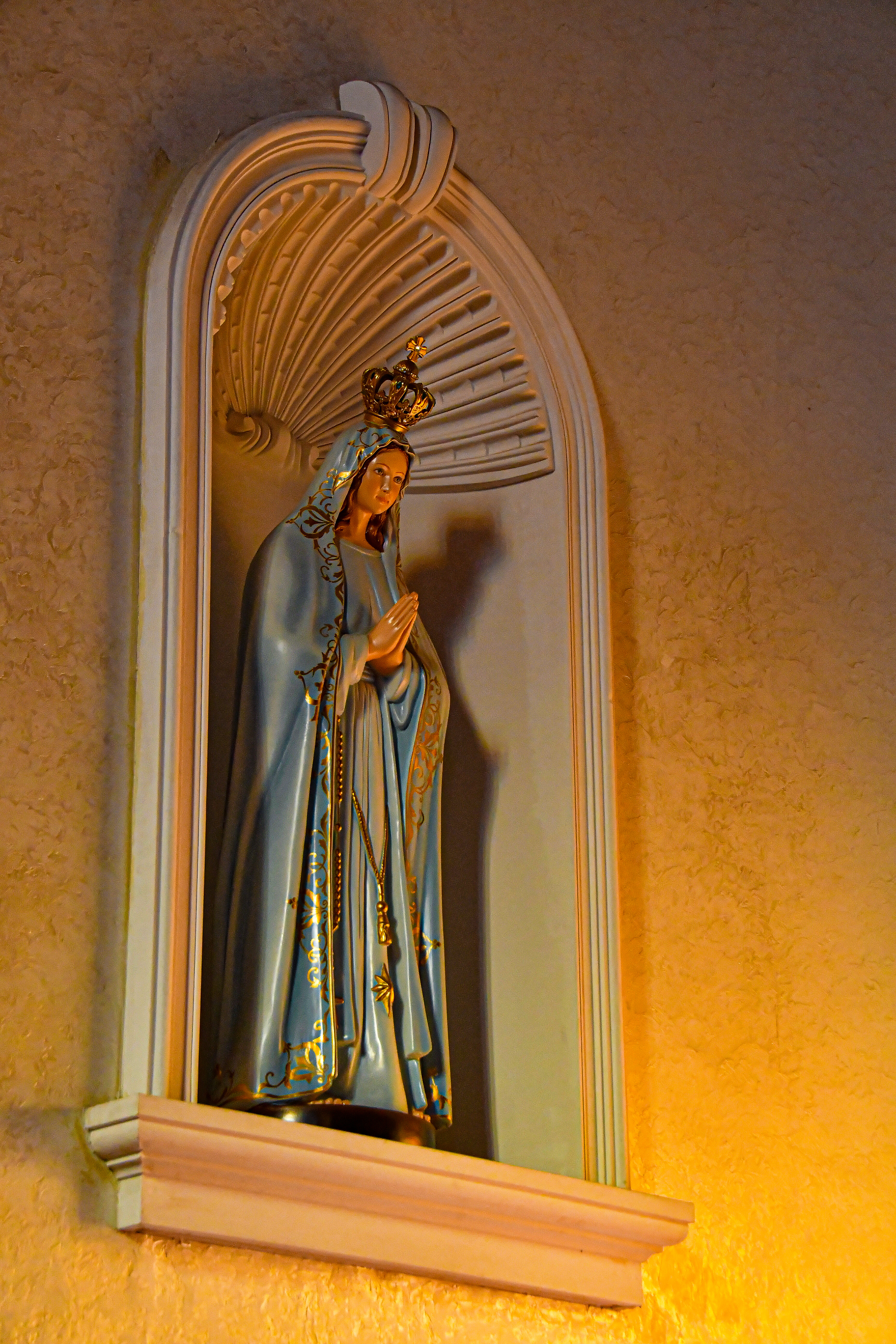
statue

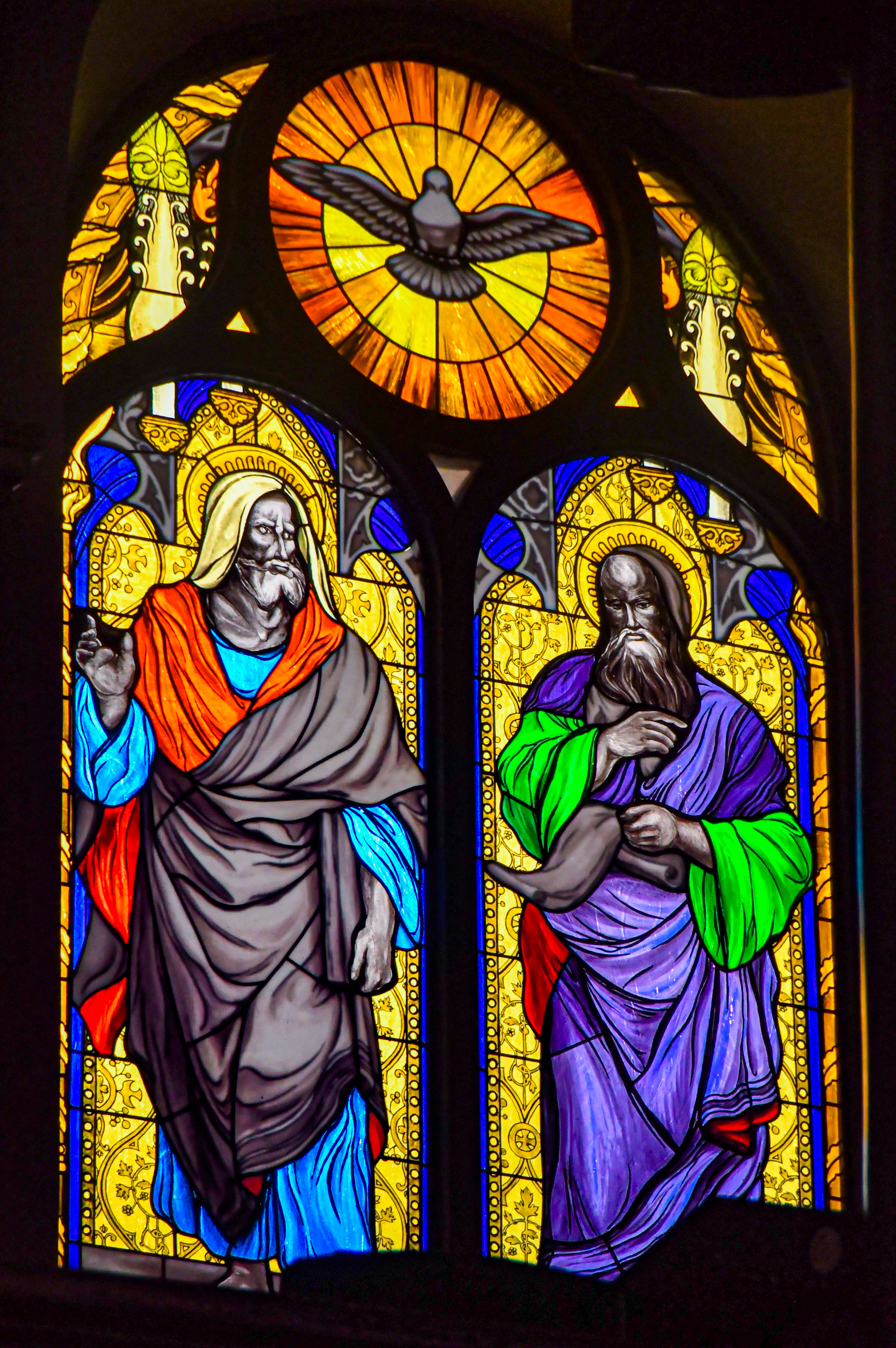
Window

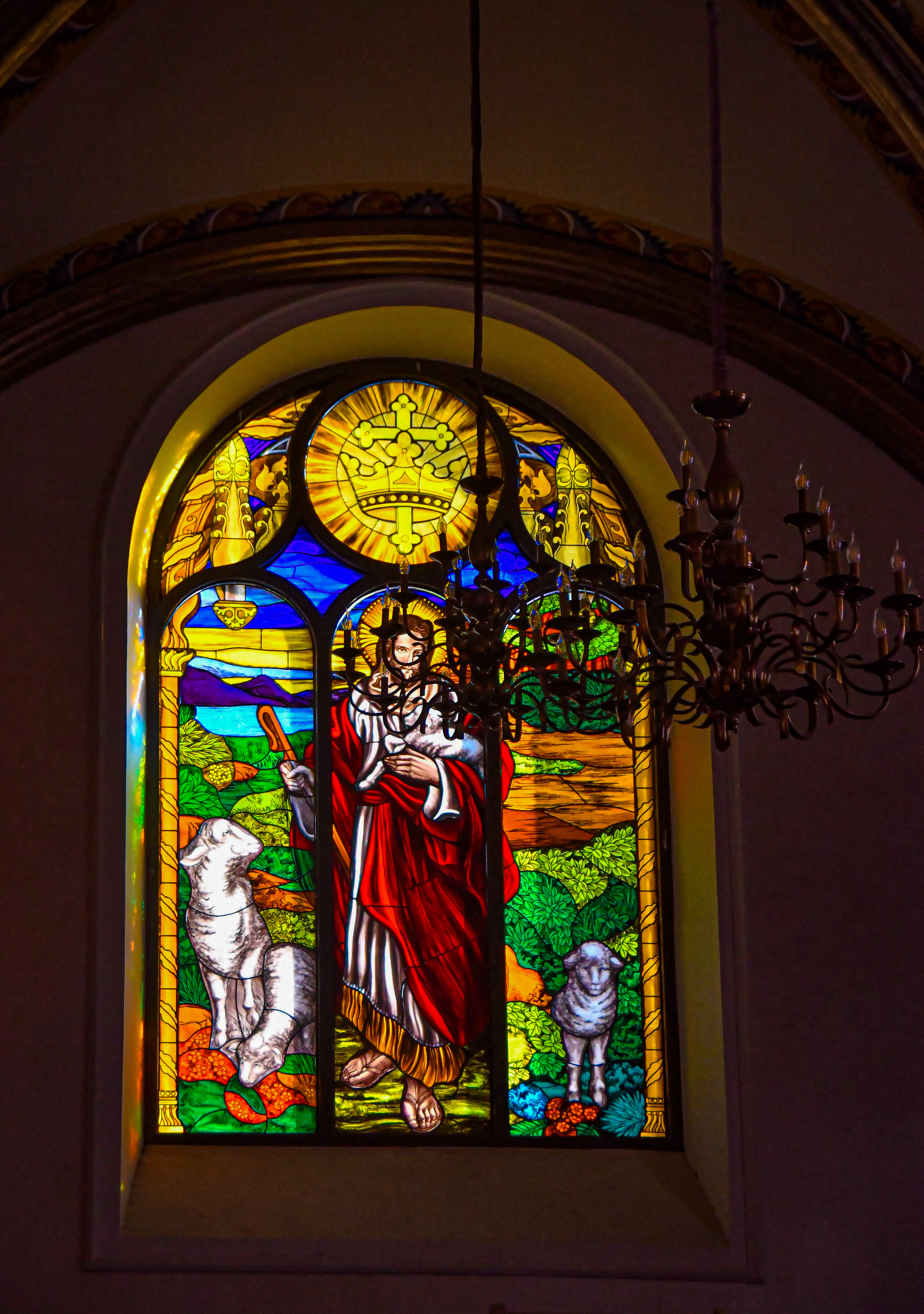
Window

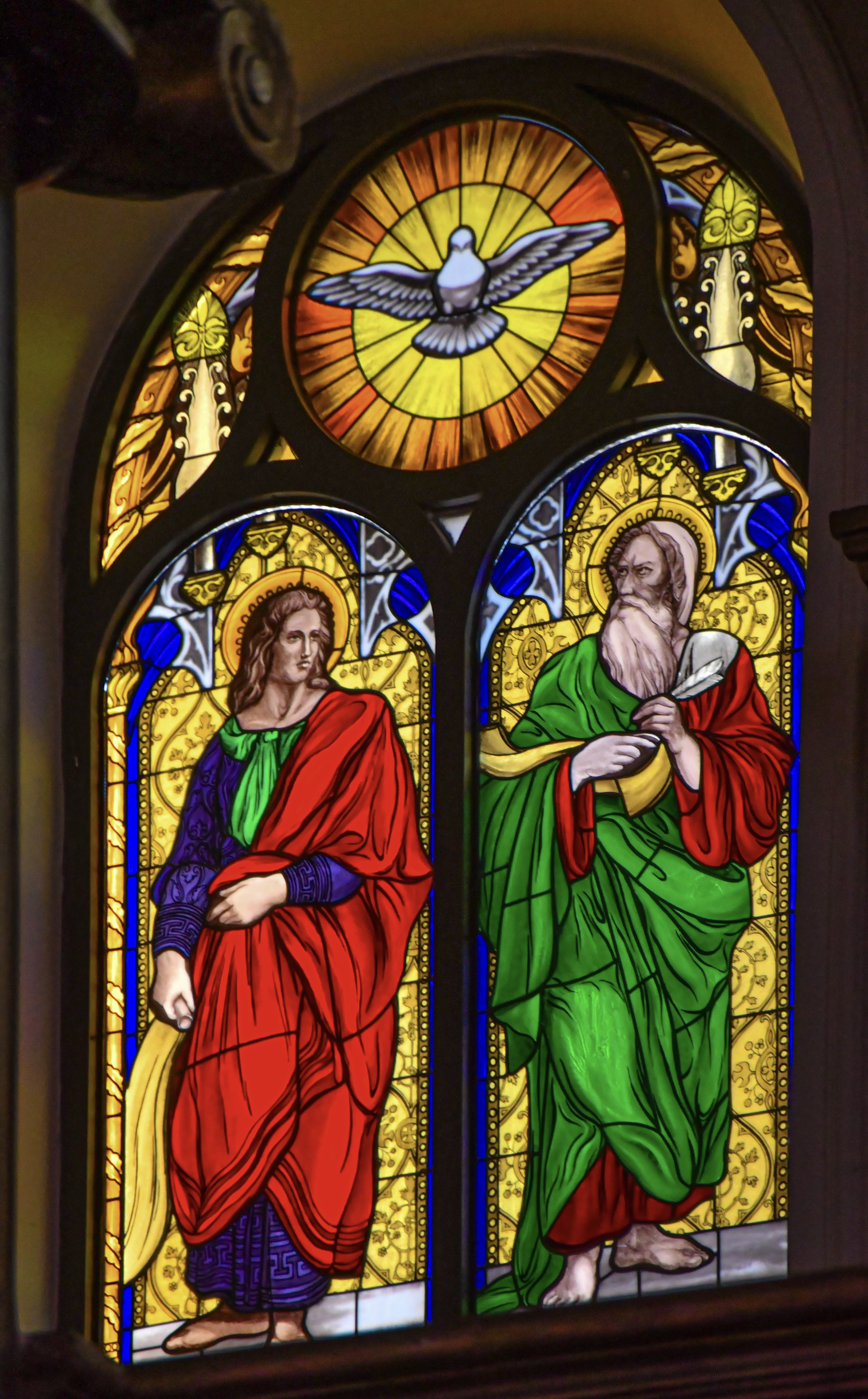
Window

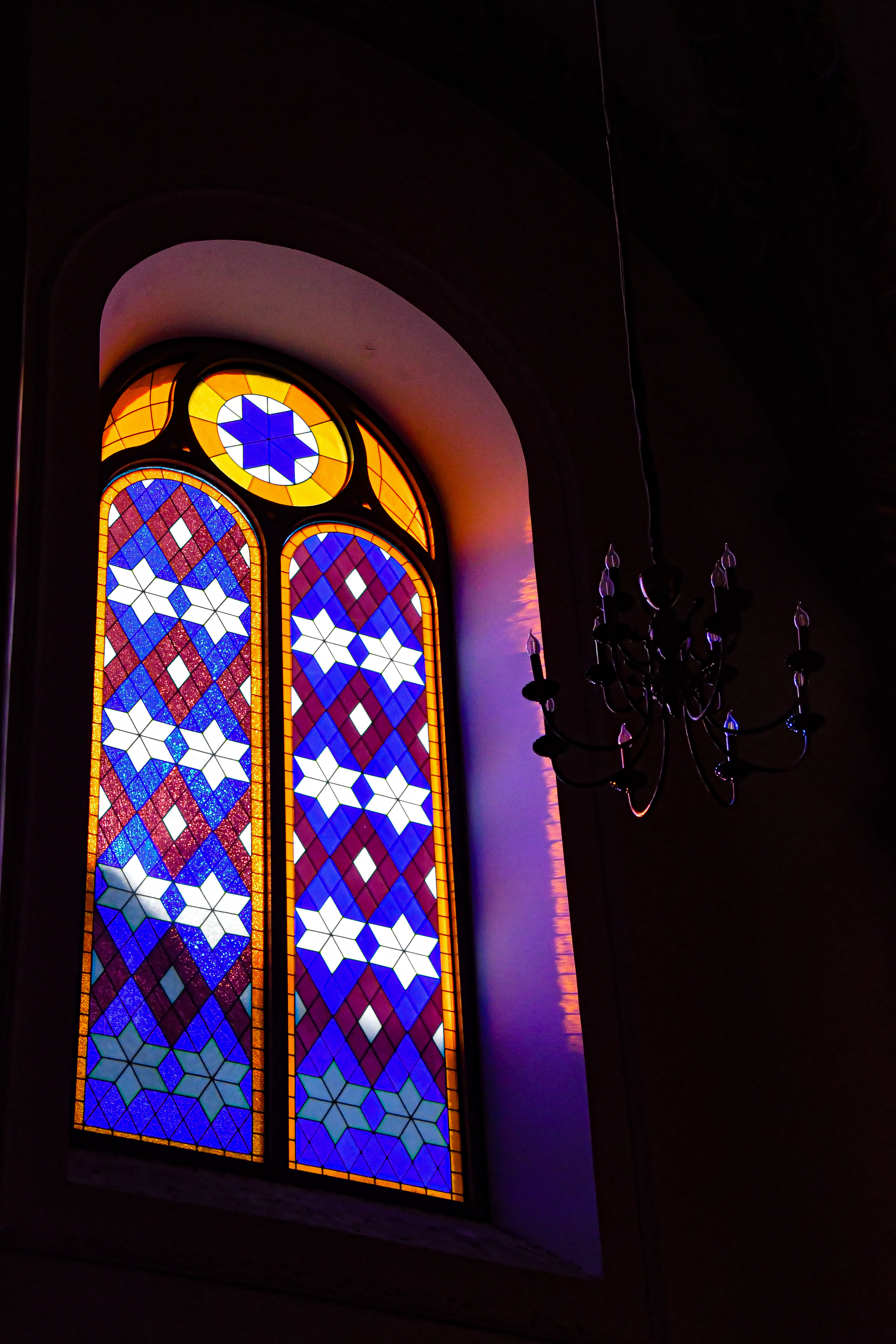
Window
