= List of Virginia Military Institute alumni =

As of 2020, Virginia Military Institute alumni include two previous Governors of Virginia, the current Secretary of the Army, a Secretary of State, Secretary of Defense, two Lieutenant Governors of Virginia, a Nobel Peace Prize winner, Pulitzer Prize winners, 13 Rhodes Scholars, Medal of Honor recipients, an Academy Award winner, an Emmy Award and Golden Globe winner, a martyr recognized by the Episcopal Church, Senators and Representatives, Governors, Lieutenant Governors, a Supreme Court Justice, numerous college and university presidents, many business leaders (presidents and CEOs) and over 285 general and flag officers, including service chiefs for three of the four armed services.

Two recent Chiefs of Engineers of the Army Corps of Engineers, Lieutenant Generals Carl A. Strock and Robert B. Flowers, as well as Acting Chief of Engineers Major General "Bo" Temple, were VMI Civil Engineering graduates.

VMI alumni include:

== Military ==
| Name | Year | Notes |
|---|---|---|
| Edward M. Almond | 1915 | Commander of U.S. Army X Corps during Korean War |
| Fletcher C. Booker Jr. | 1941 | Pennsylvania National Guard major general. Commander of U.S. Army's 28th Infantry Division |
| Paul W. Brier | 1981 | U.S. Marine Corps major general. Commanding General, 4th Marine Division; Commander, U.S. Marine Forces Africa and Europe; Deputy Commander, NATO Resolute Support Mission. |
| William A. Brown | 1980 | U.S. Navy vice admiral, Deputy Commander, United States Transportation Command (USTRANSCOM) |
| Withers Burress | 1914 | Professor of Military Science and Tactics at VMI; Commanding General, U.S. Army 100th Infantry Division |
| Richard E. Byrd | 1908 | U.S. Navy rear admiral, polar explorer, Medal of Honor recipient (1926) |
| Dan Caine | 1990 | U.S. Air Force general, venture capitalist; Chairman of the Joint Chiefs of Staff |
| Harold Coyle | 1974 | U.S. Army major; novelist |
| Samuel C. Cumming | 1917 | Decorated USMC Major General during World War II |
| Edward Edmonds | 1858 | Confederate Colonel of the 38th Virginia Infantry, killed-in-action during Pickett's Charge |
| Robert B. Flowers | 1969 | Lieutenant general and Commander, U.S. Army Corps of Engineers |
| Lee S. Gerow | 1913 | Brigadier General, U.S. Army; Assistant Commanding General of the 85th Infantry Division. A younger brother of General Leonard T. Gerow. |
| Leonard T. Gerow | 1911 | General, U.S. Army; Commanding General, V Corps (1943–45) and U.S. Fifteenth Army (1945–48). Highly regarded by Eisenhower & Bradley. Led at Omaha Beach and Battle of the Bulge. |
| William H. Gill | 1907 | Major General, U.S. Army; Commanding General of the 32nd Infantry Division. President of Colorado College 1949-1955. |
| James B. Hickey | 1982 | Colonel and commander Operation Red Dawn, which captured Saddam Hussein |
| Thomas Goode Jones | 1863 | Withdrew before graduation to join Confederate Army; wounded in battle four times; Governor of Alabama. |
| John P. Jumper | 1966 | Retired general and Chief of Staff, U.S. Air Force |
| Charles E. Kilbourne | 1894 | Recipient of Medal of Honor and Distinguished Service Cross; lieutenant general, U.S. Army |
| James H. Lane | 1854 | Confederate brigadier general, fought in Pickett's Charge, civil engineering professor, and founder of Virginia Tech |
| W. Patrick Lang | 1962 | Retired U.S. Army Special Forces officer, intelligence executive, commentator on Middle East, and author |
| Cary D. Langhorne | 1894 | Medal of Honor recipient |
| Sumter de Leon Lowry Jr. | 1914 | Florida National Guard general and insurance executive. Veteran of World Wars I and II, received Distinguished Service Medal and Bronze Star. |
| George C. Marshall | 1901 | General of the Army, Chief of Staff, U.S. Army in World War II, Secretary of State (1947–49), Secretary of Defense (1950), and Nobel Peace Prize winner |
| Richard Marshall | 1915 | General during World War II |
| Frank McCarthy | 1933 | Brigadier general, U.S. Army Reserve. Producer of the 1970 Academy Award-winning movie Patton. |
| Ryan D. McCarthy | 1997 | Captain, U.S. Army, Secretary of the Army |
| John McCausland | 1857 | Confederate brigadier-general, served under General Jubal Early |
| Darren W. McDew | 1982 | General, U.S. Air Force, Commander, United States Transportation Command (USTRANSCOM). 1st African-American Regimental Commander of Corps of Cadets. |
| Shannon Meehan | 2005 | U.S. Army Captain, Bronze Star Medal recipient, author and veterans activist |
| Thomas T. Munford | 1854 | Confederate brigadier-general |
| Randolph McCall Pate | 1921 | U.S. Marine Corps general and twenty-first Commandant of the Marine Corps |
| George S. Patton Sr. | 1852 | Confederate colonel, 22nd Virginia Infantry; died in Battle of Opequon. Namesake son graduated from and grandson attended VMI. |
| George S. Patton | 1907 | U.S. Army general. Namesake grandfather and father were both VMI graduates. Attended from 1903 to 1904 as a member of the Class of 1907 before leaving to attend the United States Military Academy. |
| Richard H. Pearce | 1953 | U.S. Army Major, Bronze Star Medal recipient, Highest-ranking U.S. military officer to defect during the Cold War era Pearce was granted asylum in Cuba. |
| J. H. Binford Peay III | 1962 | U.S. Army general, commander 101st Airborne, commander United States Central Command, and 14th superintendent of VMI |
| Lewis Burwell "Chesty" Puller | 1922 | Resigned from VMI after freshman year to enlist as a private in the U.S. Marine Corps in 1918; became lieutenant general and most decorated Marine in U.S. history |
| Thomas F. Riley | 1935 | Brigadier general in the Marine Corps, served as Inspector General of the Marine Corps. Following his retirement, he served as Orange County Supervisor 1974–1994. |
| Robert E. Rodes | 1848 | Railroad civil engineer and Confederate major general killed at the Battle of Opequon in the Shenandoah Valley |
| Edward R. Schowalter Jr. | 1951 | Medal of Honor recipient; colonel, U.S. Army |
| George R. E. Shell | 1931 | Ninth Superintendent of VMI; Brigadier general, U.S. Marine Corps |
| Lemuel C. Shepherd Jr. | 1917 | U.S. Marine Corps general and 20th Commandant of the Marine Corps |
| Scott Shipp | 1856 | Superintendent of VMI (1890–1907). Led VMI cadets at New Market under Maj. Gen. John C. Breckinridge. |
| Adolphus Staton | 1899 | Medal of Honor recipient |
| Carl A. Strock | 1970 | U.S. Army lieutenant general and commander, Army Corps of Engineers |
| Clarence E. Sutton | 1890 | Medal of Honor recipient, resigned in 1888, did not graduate |
| Sun Li-jen | 1927 | Republic of China/Taiwan lieutenant general, Second Sino-Japanese War and Chinese Civil War |
| Surapong Suwan-ath | 1979 | Royal Thai Army General, Chief of Defence Forces, 2016-2017 |
| Walter H. Taylor | 1857 | Confederate lieutenant colonel, General Robert E. Lee's aide-de-camp, lawyer, banker, author, railroad executive, Virginia state senator |
| William P. Upshur | 1902 | Medal of Honor recipient; Marine Corps major general; Commander, Dept. of the Pacific, 1940–42 |
| James A. Walker | 1852 | Expelled in 1852 for "disobedience" in Stonewall Jackson's classroom, after challenging Jackson to a duel over a perceived insult. VMI granted him an honorary degree in 1872 in recognition of his Civil War service, where he rose to the rank of brigadier general and commanded the "Stonewall Brigade". |
| Reuben Lindsay Walker | 1845 | Confederate brigadier general and artilleryman. |

== Government and politics ==
| Name | Year | Notes |
|---|---|---|
| Mike Waltz | 1996 | 32nd United States ambassador to the United Nations, 29th United States National Security Advisor, former U.S. Representative for Florida's 6th congressional district |
| Mitchell Werbell III | Unknown | Mercenary |
| Harry F. Byrd Jr. | 1935 | U.S. Senator from Virginia (1965–83) |
| Tom C. Clark | 1921 | Associate Justice of the Supreme Court of the United States (1949–67), United States Attorney General (1945–49) |
| Charles Allen Culberson | 1874 | U.S. Senator; Governor of Texas |
| James U. Downs | 1963 | Senior resident superior court judge in western North Carolina, 1983–2013; lawyer in Hickory and Franklin, North Carolina |
| Richard Thomas Walker Duke | 1844 | Confederate Colonel; Member of U.S. House of Representatives and Virginia House of Delegates |
| Grenville Gaines | 1874 | mayor of Warrenton, Virginia; lawyer and banker |
| Elmon T. Gray | 1946 | Virginia State Senator |
| George W. Hardy Jr. | 1920 | Mayor of Shreveport, Louisiana (1932–34); state circuit court of appeal judge (1943–67) |
| William Mahone | 1847 | Confederate major general, Member of Virginia House of Delegates, U.S. Senator (1881–87), and railroad executive |
| Marshall McDonald | 1860 | U.S. Commissioner of Fish and Fisheries (1888–95) |
| Ralph Northam | 1981 | U.S. Army Medical Corps major, Virginia State Senator, 40th Lieutenant Governor of Virginia, and 73rd Governor of Virginia |
| Lewis F. Payne Jr. | 1967 | Member of Congress from Virginia |
| Robert Reid | 1875 | Justice of the Louisiana Supreme Court |
| Henry G. Shirley | 1896 | Commissioner, Virginia Department of Highways |
| Joseph Short | 1925 | White House Press Secretary under Harry S. Truman |
| C. Bascom Slemp | 1891 | Representative for the Ninth Congressional District of Virginia; philanthropist |
| Ernest O. Thompson | 1910 | General, Texas National Guard; Texas Railroad Commissioner, mayor of Amarillo, petroleum expert |
| Steven J. McAuliffe | 1970 | Senior Judge of the US District Court for the District of New Hampshire, husband of the late Christa McAuliffe who died in the Space Shuttle Challenger disaster. |

== Arts and entertainment ==
| Name | Year | Notes |
|---|---|---|
| Mel Brooks | Did not graduate | During World War II, the U.S. Army used VMI to give technical education and training to soldiers who did not matriculate as cadets nor live within the VMI cadet system. Before becoming a filmmaker, he trained at VMI for 12 weeks. |
| Dabney Coleman | Did not graduate | Movie and television actor, attended VMI for only two years |
| John D. Ewing | 1913 | Publisher of Shreveport Times, 1931–52 |
| Moses Jacob Ezekiel | 1866 | Sculptor |
| John Cherry Monks Jr. | 1932 | Playwright, actor, author, screenwriter, producer and World War II U.S. Marine |
| Fred Willard | 1955 | Comedic actor; U.S. Army officer |

== Sports ==
| Name | Year | Notes |
|---|---|---|
| Ron Carter | 1978 | former NBA shooting guard |
| Joe Fortunato | 1954 | former NFL linebacker |
| Ryan Glynn | 1995 | Professional baseball player in Japan |
| Sam Horner | 1959 | former NFL defensive back |
| Pete Johnson | 1958 | former NFL running back |
| Dan Lyle | 1992 | Captain of the USA Eagles national rugby team |
| Joe Muha | 1942 | former NFL fullback |
| Bosh Pritchard | 1941 | former NFL running back |
| Ray Reutt | 1942 | former NFL end |
| George Robison | 1951 | former NFL offensive guard |
| Bobby Ross | 1959 | Football coach of West Point, The Citadel, University of Maryland, Georgia Tech, San Diego Chargers and Detroit Lions |
| George Stallings | 1886 | Major League Baseball player and manager |
| Mark Stock | 1988 | former NFL wide receiver |
| Bobby Thomason | 1949 | NFL Pro Bowl quarterback |
| Reggie Williams | 2008 | Led NCAA Division 1 scoring in 2006 and 2007, playing for the Miami Heat in the NBA |
| Mike Wooten | 1986 | former NFL center |
| Josh Winder | 2018 | MLB pitcher |

== Others ==
| Name | Year | Notes |
|---|---|---|
| James E. Brown III | 1976 | Fellow and past president of Society of Experimental Test Pilots and Fellow of Royal Aeronautical Society |
| Josiah Bunting III | 1963 | Superintendent of VMI, 1995–2002; Rhodes Scholar; author |
| Jonathan Myrick Daniels | 1961 | American civil rights activist and one of fifteen modern-day Anglican Church martyrs |
| Benjamin Franklin Ficklin | 1849 | A founder of the Pony Express |
| Robert Q. Marston | 1944 | President of University of Florida, Director of National Institutes of Health, Rhodes Scholar |
| Giles H. Miller | 1924 | Banker, President of VMI Alumni Association, Director of The George C. Marshall Foundation |
| George S. Patton (attorney) | 1877 | California attorney and real estate developer. Namesake father also graduated from VMI and namesake son also attended VMI. |
| Jonathan Edwards Woodbridge | 1865 | Shipbuilder and naval architect |
| Richard Harwood Pearce | 1953 | Defected to Cuba in 1967. |
