= General Temple =

General Temple may refer to:

- Herbert R. Temple Jr. (born 1928), U.S. Army lieutenant general
- Merdith W.B. Temple (fl. 1970-2010s), U.S. Army major general
- Richard Temple, 1st Viscount Cobham (1675–1749), British Army general
