= General Bratton =

General Bratton may refer to:

- John Bratton (1831–1898), Confederate States Army brigadier general
- Joseph K. Bratton (1926–2007), U.S. Army lieutenant general
- Shawn Bratton (fl. 1990s–2020s), U.S. Air Force brigadier general
