= Elvin Ralph Heiberg =

Elvin Ragnvald Heiberg I
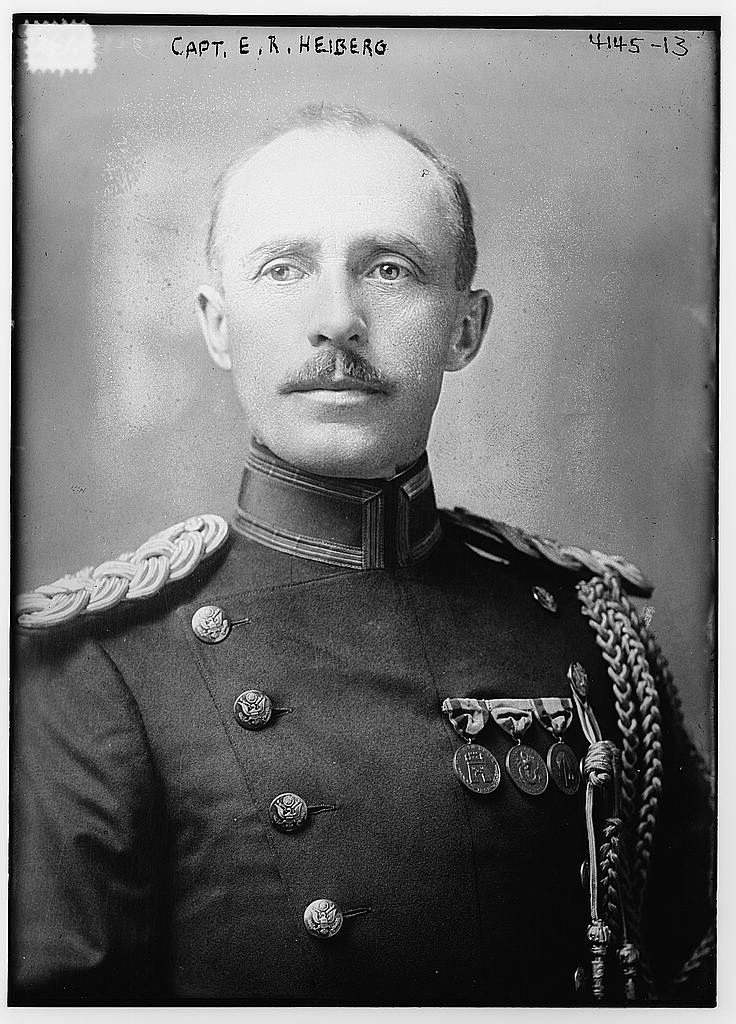
- Heiberg circa 1917

Governor of Cotabato

Personal details
- Born: April 12, 1873 Minnesota
- Died: March 2, 1917 (aged 43) Udine, Italy

Military service
- Allegiance: United States
- Branch/service: United States Army
- Years of service: 1896–1917
- Rank: Major
- Battles/wars: Spanish-American War; Philippine-American War; World War I

Major Elvin Ragnvald Heiberg I (April 12, 1873 – March 2, 1917), served as the governor of Cotabato on Mindanao island in the Philippines. He was killed in action during World War I.

== Biography ==
He was born on April 12, 1873, in Minnesota to John Peter Heiberg (1829-1908) and Marie Dorethe Gronn (1846-1929).

Heiberg was appointed to the United States Military Academy from Wisconsin in 1892 and graduated 40th in his class, in 1896. Commissioned as a cavalry officer, he served in Puerto Rico during the Spanish–American War. He then participated in the China Relief Expedition and served in the Philippine–American War.

Heiberg died on March 2, 1917, at the Austro-Italian front during World War I when his horse was frightened and reared. He fell off his horse and his head hit a rock. His remains were returned to the United States and interred at the West Point Cemetery on May 19, 1920.

The story attached to his wife's journal letters says that he was accidentally killed while "demonstrating a dismount-at-full-gallop from a horse to a gathering of nobility and diplomats. In America, horses are trained to stop when the rider is making a dismount at full gallop. In Europe, horses are trained to keep galloping on when the rider makes a dismount. Major Heiberg was not aware of that important difference in training, and he made the demonstration on a horse trained in Europe. Therefore, he was trampled by the horse when he made the dismount and did not survive his injuries. A tragic ending for a very noble officer and gentleman."

== See also ==
- Elvin Ragnvald Heiberg III, his grandson
