= Gold Castles =

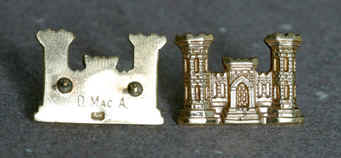
MacArthur's Gold Castles

Gold Castles is the name of the 14K gold insignia pin handed down from General Douglas MacArthur to his chief engineer Major General Leif J. Sverdrup in 1945, who established a tradition in 1975 that it shall be given to each successive Chief of Engineers of the United States Army Corps of Engineers.

== Origin: Corps Castle insignia ==
The pin is a 14K rendition of the logo of the Corps, the so-called Corps Castle, which was used on an informal basis by cadets at West Point dating back to 1839. Beginning in 1841, many wore personal insignia of this type on the uniforms. These came to be called Gold Castles. In 1902, the castle was formally adopted by the Army as the insignia of the Corps of Engineers. It was changed to silver from 1894 to 1921.

== Originally a graduation gift to Douglas MacArthur ==
A pair of the gold pin insignia of the Corps Castle were graduation gifts from his family originally received by cadet and newly commissioned Second Lieutenant Douglas MacArthur at the United States Military Academy at West Point, New York in the Class of 1903. Trained as an engineer, MacArthur wore them through his service in World War I, as Commandant of West Point, as Army Chief of Staff, and as Supreme Commander of Allied Forces in the Pacific Theater in World War II.

In 1945, General MacArthur presented his Gold Castles to Major General Leif J. Sverdrup, his chief engineer. General Sverdrup later recalled that MacArthur told him that, although he personally valued them very much, they "deserved to be worn by a real engineer." (This was apparently a reference to General MacArthur's transfer from the Corps of Engineers to Infantry in 1917).

== Beginning a tradition: General Sverdrup ==
On May 2, 1975, upon the 200th anniversary of the Corps, retired General Sverdrup, who had civil engineering projects including the landmark 17 mile-long Chesapeake Bay Bridge-Tunnel to his credit, presented the Gold Castles to then-Chief of Engineers Lieutenant General William C. Gribble, Jr., who had also served under General MacArthur in the Pacific.

Later at the same Fort Belvoir ceremony, General Gribble announced an intention to begin a tradition of passing the gold castle pins along to be worn by each future head of the Corps. His successor received them the following year, as has each subsequent Chief of Engineers.

The current "castle" logo of the Corps is a rendition of the more detailed of the Gold Castle pins.
