= List of United States Army Corps of Engineers chiefs of engineers =

Commanding officer of the U.S. Army Corps of Engineers

Chief of Engineers of the United States Army
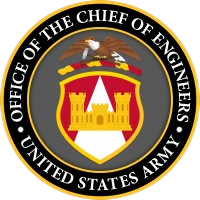
- Seal of the chief of engineers

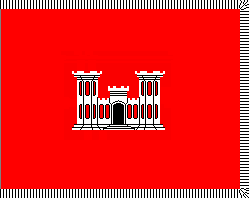
- Flag of the chief of engineers

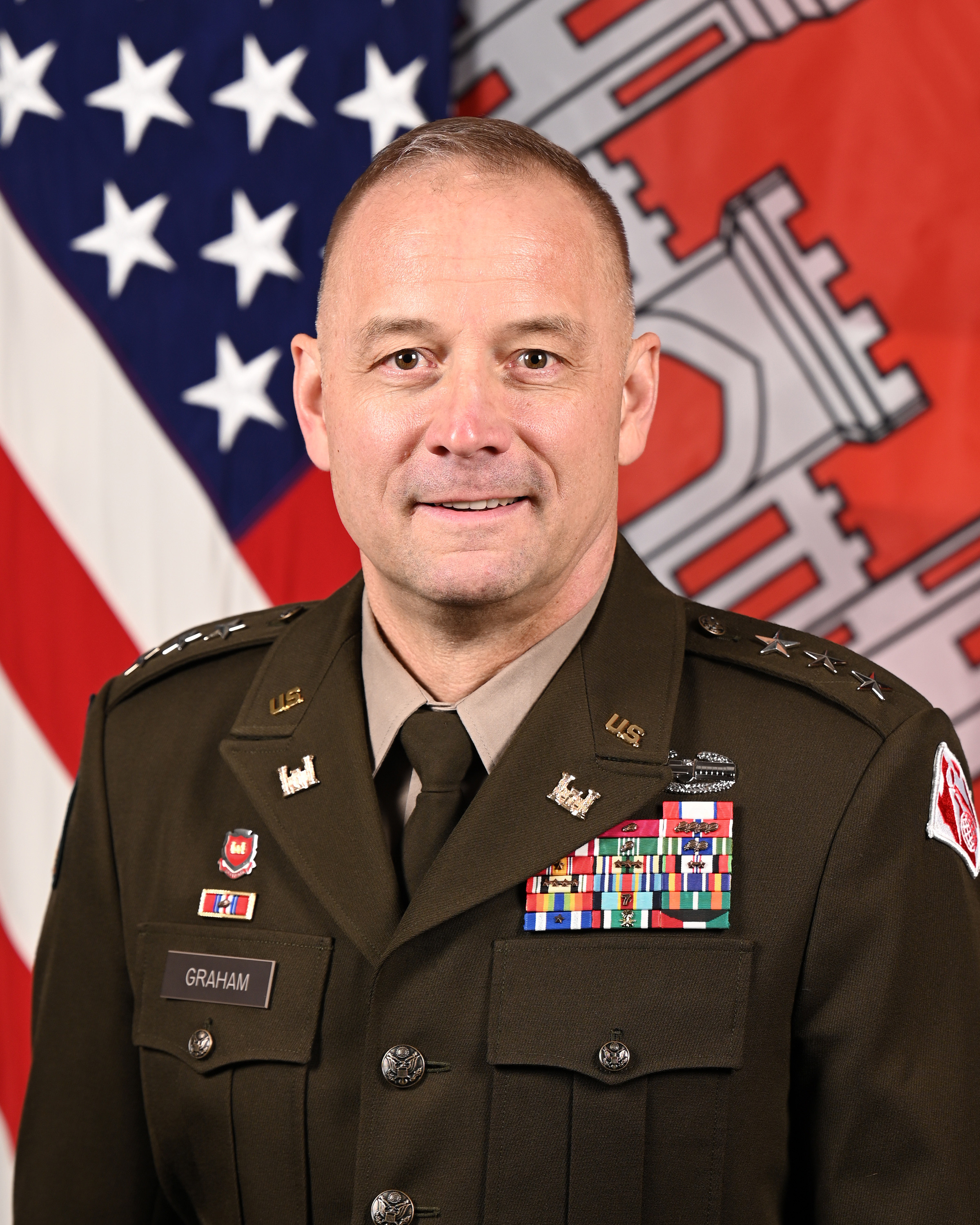
- Incumbent; LTG William H. Graham Jr. since 13 September 2024
- Department of the Army
- Reports to: Secretary of the Army; Assistant Secretary of the Army (Civil Works)
- Seat: The Pentagon, Arlington County, Virginia, U.S.
- Appointer: The president; with Senate advice and consent
- Term length: Four years
- Constituting instrument: 10 U.S.C. § 3036
- Formation: April 1776
- First holder: LTC Rufus Putnam
- Website: Official website

The chief of engineers is a principal United States Army staff officer at the Pentagon. The chief advises the Army on engineering matters, and serves as the Army's topographer and proponent for real estate and other related engineering programs. The chief of engineers is the senior service engineer for the Department of Defense, responsible for integrating all aspects of combat, general and geospatial engineering across the Joint Force.

The chief of engineers also commands the United States Army Corps of Engineers. As commander of the U.S. Army Corps of Engineers, the chief of engineers leads a major Army command that is the world's largest public engineering, design, and construction management agency. This office defines policy and guidance, and it plans direction for the organizations within the Corps. The chief of engineers is currently a lieutenant general billet but in the past has been held by field grade officers as low as major. Civilian oversight of the chief of engineers is provided by the assistant secretary of the Army for civil works.

A pair of golden castle pins, a graduation gift, was given to Major General Leif J. Sverdrup by General of the Army Douglas MacArthur in 1945, as MacArthur thought Sverdrup was more deserving to wear them. Sverdrup gave them to the chief of engineers in 1975. Every chief of engineers since then has worn MacArthur's pins.

== Chiefs of engineers ==
Image	Rank	Name	Begin date	End date	Notes
	Colonel	Richard Gridley	June 1775	April 1776	
Rufus Putnam	Lieutenant colonel	Rufus Putnam	April 1776	December 1776	
Louis Lebègue Duportail	Brigadier general	Louis Lebègue Duportail	22 July 1777	October, 10, 1783	
	Lieutenant colonel	Stephen Rochefontaine	26 February 1795	7 May 1798	
Henry Burbeck	Major	Henry Burbeck	7 May 1798	1 April 1802	
Jonathan Williams	Colonel	Jonathan Williams	1 April 1802	20 June 1803	
Jonathan Williams	Colonel	Jonathan Williams	19 April 1805	31 July 1812	
Joseph Gardner Swift	Colonel	Joseph Gardner Swift	31 July 1812	12 November 1818	
Walker Keith Armistead	Colonel	Walker Keith Armistead	12 November 1818	1 June 1821	
Alexander Macomb	Colonel	Alexander Macomb	1 June 1821	24 May 1828	
Charles Gratiot	Colonel	Charles Gratiot	24 May 1828	6 December 1838	
Joseph Gilbert Totten	Colonel	Joseph Gilbert Totten	6 December 1838	22 April 1864	
Richard Delafield	Brigadier general	Richard Delafield	22 April 1864	8 August 1866	
Andrew Atkinson Humphreys	Brigadier general	Andrew A. Humphreys	8 August 1866	30 June 1879	
Horatio Wright	Brigadier general	Horatio Gouverneur Wright	30 June 1879	6 March 1884	
John Newton	Brigadier general	John Newton	6 March 1884	27 August 1886	
James Chatham Duane	Brigadier general	James Chatham Duane	11 October 1886	30 June 1888	
Thomas Lincoln Casey	Brigadier general	Thomas Lincoln Casey	6 July 1888	10 May 1895	
William Price Craighill	Brigadier general	William Price Craighill	10 May 1895	1 February 1897	
John Moulder Wilson	Brigadier general	John Moulder Wilson	1 February 1897	30 April 1901	
Henry Martyn Robert	Brigadier general	Henry Martyn Robert	30 April 1901	2 May 1901	
John W. Barlow	Brigadier general	John W. Barlow	2 May 1901	3 May 1901	
George Lewis Gillespie Jr.	Brigadier general	George Lewis Gillespie Jr.	3 May 1901	23 January 1904	
Alexander Mackenzie	Brigadier general	Alexander Mackenzie	23 January 1904	25 May 1908	
William Louis Marshall	Brigadier general	William Louis Marshall	2 July 1908	11 June 1910	
William Herbert Bixby	Brigadier general	William Herbert Bixby	12 June 1910	11 August 1913	
William Trent Rossell	Brigadier general	William Trent Rossell	12 August 1913	11 October 1913	
Dan Christie Kingman	Brigadier general	Dan Christie Kingman	12 October 1913	6 March 1916	
William Murray Black	Major general	William Murray Black	7 March 1916	31 October 1919	
Lansing Hoskins Beach	Major general	Lansing Hoskins Beach	10 February 1920	18 June 1924	
Harry Taylor	Major general	Harry Taylor	19 June 1924	26 June 1926	
Edgar Jadwin	Major general	Edgar Jadwin	27 June 1926	7 August 1929	
Lytle Brown	Major general	Lytle Brown	1 October 1929	1 October 1933	
Edward Murphy Markham	Major general	Edward Murphy Markham	1 October 1933	18 October 1937	
Julian Larcombe Schley	Major general	Julian Larcombe Schley	18 October 1937	1 October 1941	
Eugene Reybold	Lieutenant general	Eugene Reybold	1 October 1941	30 September 1945	
Raymond A. Wheeler	Lieutenant general	Raymond Albert Wheeler	4 October 1945	28 February 1949	
Lewis A. Pick	Lieutenant general	Lewis A. Pick	1 March 1949	26 January 1953	
Samuel D. Sturgis Jr.	Lieutenant general	Samuel D. Sturgis Jr.	17 March 1953	30 September 1956	
Emerson C. Itschner	Lieutenant general	Emerson C. Itschner	1 October 1956	27 March 1961	
Walter K. Wilson Jr.	Lieutenant general	Walter K. Wilson Jr.	19 May 1961	1 July 1965	
William F. Cassidy	Lieutenant general	William F. Cassidy	1 July 1965	31 July 1969	
Frederick J. Clarke	Lieutenant general	Frederick J. Clarke	1 August 1969	31 July 1973	
William C. Gribble Jr.	Lieutenant general	William C. Gribble Jr.	1 August 1973	30 June 1976	
John W. Morris	Lieutenant general	John W. Morris	1 July 1976	30 September 1980	
Joseph K. Bratton	Lieutenant general	Joseph K. Bratton	1 October 1980	14 September 1984	
Elvin R. Heiberg III	Lieutenant general	Elvin R. Heiberg III	14 September 1984	31 May 1988	
Henry J. Hatch	Lieutenant general	Henry J. Hatch	17 June 1988	4 June 1992	
Arthur E. Williams	Lieutenant general	Arthur E. Williams	24 August 1992	30 June 1996	
Joe Nathan Ballard	Lieutenant general	Joe Nathan Ballard	1 October 1996	2 August 2000	
Robert B. Flowers	Lieutenant general	Robert B. Flowers	23 October 2000	1 July 2004	
Carl A. Strock	Lieutenant general	Carl A. Strock	1 July 2004	17 May 2007	
Robert L. Van Antwerp Jr.	Lieutenant general	Robert L. Van Antwerp Jr.	17 May 2007	17 June 2011	
Merdith W.B. (Bo) Temple	Major general	Merdith W.B. Temple	17 June 2011	22 May 2012	
Thomas P. Bostick	Lieutenant general	Thomas P. Bostick	22 May 2012	19 May 2016	
Todd T. Semonite	Lieutenant general	Todd T. Semonite	19 May 2016	10 September 2020	
Scott A. Spellmon	Lieutenant general	Scott A. Spellmon	10 September 2020	13 September 2024	
William H. Graham Jr.	Lieutenant general	William H. Graham Jr.	13 September 2024	present	

== See also ==
- Corps Castle
- Gold Castles
