= Thomas P. Bostick =

Chief of Engineers of the United States Army (2012–2016)

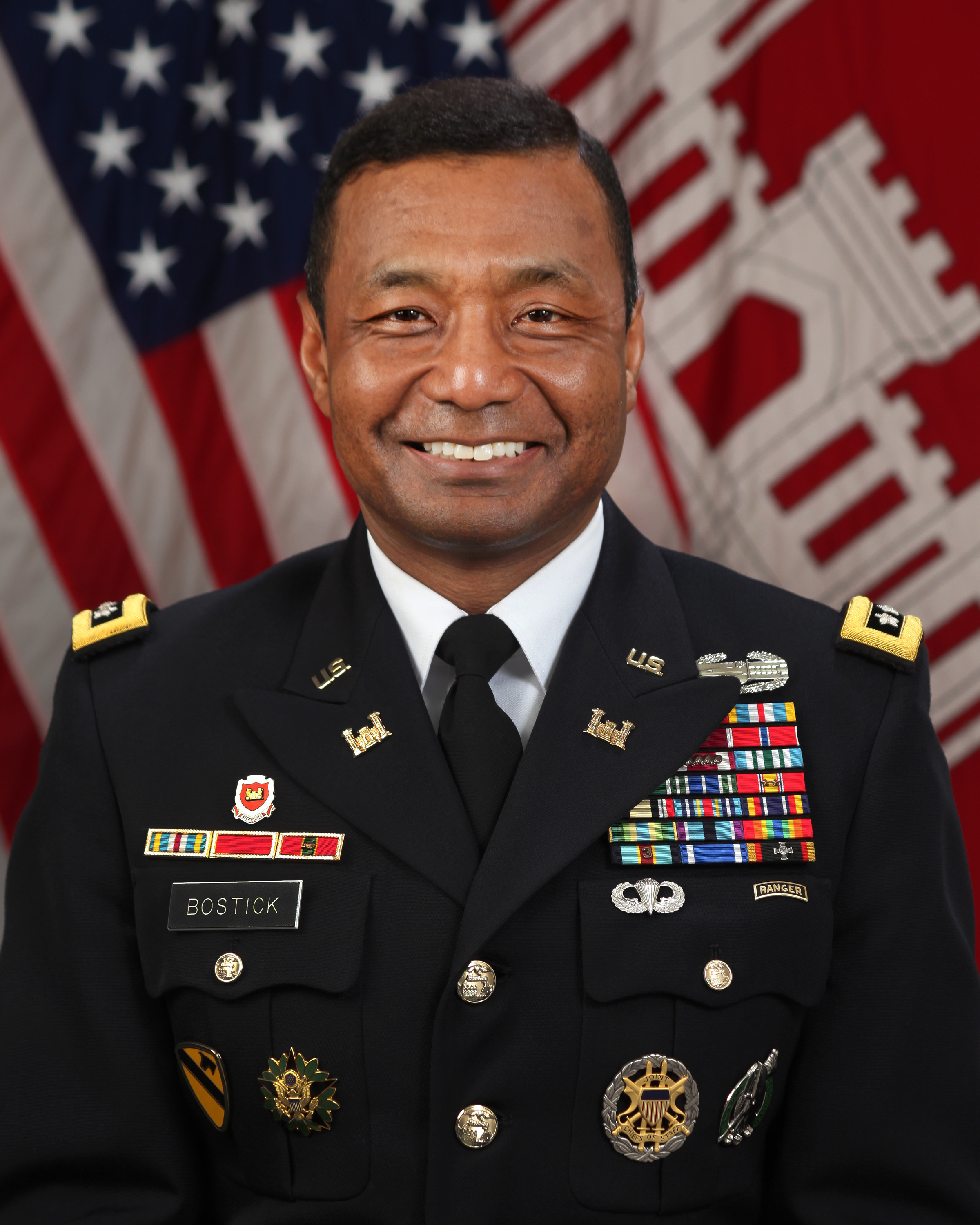
- Official portrait, 2012
- Born: September 23, 1956 (age 70); Fukuoka, Japan
- Education: West Point (BS Applied Science and Engineering); Stanford University (MS Civil Engineering); Stanford University (MS Mechanical Engineering); Oxford University (MBA); George Washington University (PhD, Systems Engineering)
- Military career
- Allegiance: United States
- Branch: United States Army
- Service years: 1978–2016
- Rank: Lieutenant General
- Commands: Army Corps of Engineers; Army Recruiting Command

Thomas Paul Bostick (born September 23, 1956) was the 53rd Chief of Engineers of the United States Army and Commanding General of the Army Corps of Engineers. Since the creation of West Point in 1802 as the Nation's first engineering school, Bostick is the only African American graduate of the academy to serve as the Chief of Engineers and Commanding General of the U.S. Army Corps of Engineers. Following his military career, Bostick served as the Chief Operating Officer and President of Intrexon Bioengineering (now Precigen). He serves on the Boards of CSX, Perma-Fix, Fidelity Investments' Equity and High Income Fund, HireVue, and Allonnia. He serves on the non-profit boards of Resilient Cities Catalyst and American Corporate Partners, a 501(c)(3) organization dedicated to assisting U.S. Veterans in their transition from the armed services to the civilian workforce. He is also a Forbes Contributor.

== Early life and education ==
Bostick was born on September 23, 1956, in Fukuoka, Japan and raised all over the world, in an Army family, as one of five children of Master Sergeant Sidney C. Bostick and Mrs. Fumiko M. Bostick. He graduated from the United States Military Academy (West Point) with a Bachelor of Science degree in June 1978. Bostick was the Captain of the 150-pound football team at West Point. He later earned a Master of Science degree in both civil and mechanical engineering from Stanford University in 1985. Bostick served as an associate professor of Mechanical Engineering at West Point. He also earned an MBA from Oxford University and a PhD from George Washington University in systems engineering in 2016. Bostick is a graduate of the Engineer Officer Basic and Advance courses, the U.S. Army Command and General Staff College, and the U.S. Army War College. He is a registered Professional Engineer in Virginia.

== Career ==
Bostick was commissioned as a second lieutenant combat engineer officer after graduation from West Point. His initial assignment was to the 54th Engineer Battalion in Germany where he served as a Platoon Leader in A Company, as the Battalion Maintenance Officer, and as the B Company Commander. His company was selected as the company with the best maintenance program in the Army, and the company also won the US Army Europe Softball Championships. Bostick represented the Army in international competition as a member of the All-Army Powerlifting team in the 165-pound weight class.

Bostick served as an assistant professor of Mechanical Engineering at the United States Military Academy, as well as a White House Fellow, serving as a special assistant to the United States Secretary of Veterans Affairs. In 2015, Lt. General Bostick received the John W. Gardner Legacy of Leadership Award. This is the highest award presented by the White House Fellows Foundation and Association, given in recognition of proven leadership, dedicated public service, and sustained support to the White House Fellows Program. Colin Powell, also a recipient of the Legacy of Leadership Award, presented the award to Bostick at the 50th Anniversary of the White House Fellows program.

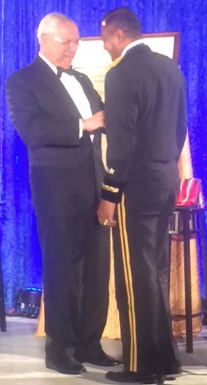
General Powell presents Bostick the White House Fellows Legacy of Leadership Award

In 1990, Bostick served at the US Army Europe Headquarters in Heidelberg, Germany where he was responsible for helping to plan the drawdown of forces in Europe. He then served as the S3 of the 40th Engineer Battalion and later as the S3 of the 1st Armored Division Engineer Brigade. He served as the Executive Officer for the Chief of Engineers, Lt. General Arthur E. Williams, before assuming command of the 1st Engineer Battalion, 1st Infantry Division at Fort Riley, Kansas. His battalion fought fires in Idaho in 1994, and was considered to have one of the most successful performances for an engineer battalion at the National Training Center.

Bostick then commanded the Engineer Brigade in 1st Armored Division which included deployments to Bosnia and to Kosovo for some elements of the brigade. His brigade conducted the eleven ceremonies for the 55th Anniversary of the Normandy Invasion. One of his companies won the Itschner Award as the Best Engineer Company in the Army, and the Sturgis Award for the best Engineer Non-Commissioned Officer in the Army.

He later served for two years as the Executive Officer of the Chief of Staff of the Army, General Eric K. Shinseki. Subsequently, he served in the National Military Command Center as a watch officer and was on duty for the September 11 attacks.

=== Assistant Division Commander (Maneuver and Support), 1st Cavalry Division ===
Bostick served as Assistant Division Commander for Maneuver and later as Assistant Division Commander for Support of the 1st Cavalry Division. He ensured the successful training and deployment into Iraq of more than 25,000 soldiers and their equipment.

=== Commander of the Gulf Region Division – Iraq ===
Subsequently, he commanded the Gulf Region Division in Iraq where he and his teams initiated over $11 billion of an $18 billion construction program. He formed successful teams where the USACE engineers were embedded with the combat maneuver units.

=== Commander, U.S. Army Recruiting Command ===
After the Army failed its recruiting mission in 2005, Bostick was assigned as the Commanding General of U.S. Army Recruiting Command (USAREC). Through a number of efforts Bostick made significant changes in the command such as moving away from individual recruiting to team recruiting while focusing on the well-being of soldiers and families. He was part of the team that developed the new Army slogan, Army Strong. Army recruiting continued to achieve its mission for nearly the next decade.

=== Deputy Chief of Staff for Personnel (DCSPER), G-1, U.S. Army ===
As the Army's Chief Human Resources Officer, he was responsible for the policies that affected more than 1 million soldiers and 330,000 civilians. He worked with the Army leadership on numerous key issues such as expanding opportunities for women, medical care for our returning troops, and religious accommodations for Sikhs. Bostick was also on the Comprehensive Review Group that made a recommendation to the Secretary of Defense and the President to allow gays and lesbians to serve openly in the military.

=== Chief of Engineers and Commanding General, U.S. Army Corps of Engineers ===
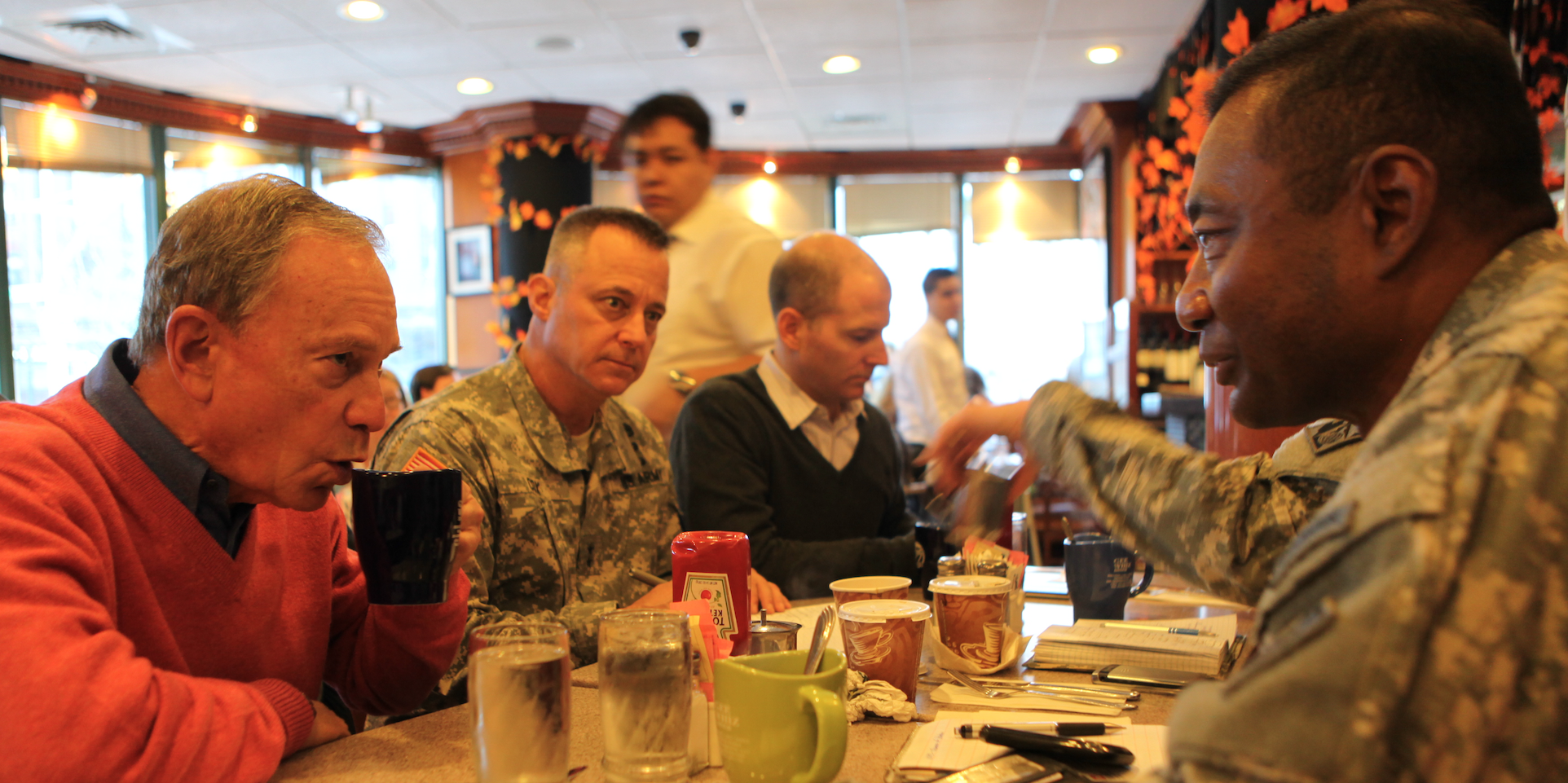
Bostick meets with New York Mayor Bloomberg immediately after Super Storm Sandy

As Chief of Engineers he led the management of over 3000 projects including operations and maintenance of over $225 billion of water related infrastructure, large construction, and environmental and energy projects. He led over 34,000 employees in 43 Districts, seven Laboratories, and engaged in over 110 countries.

After Superstorm Sandy, Bostick was responsible for completing projects as part of a $5 billion recovery program.

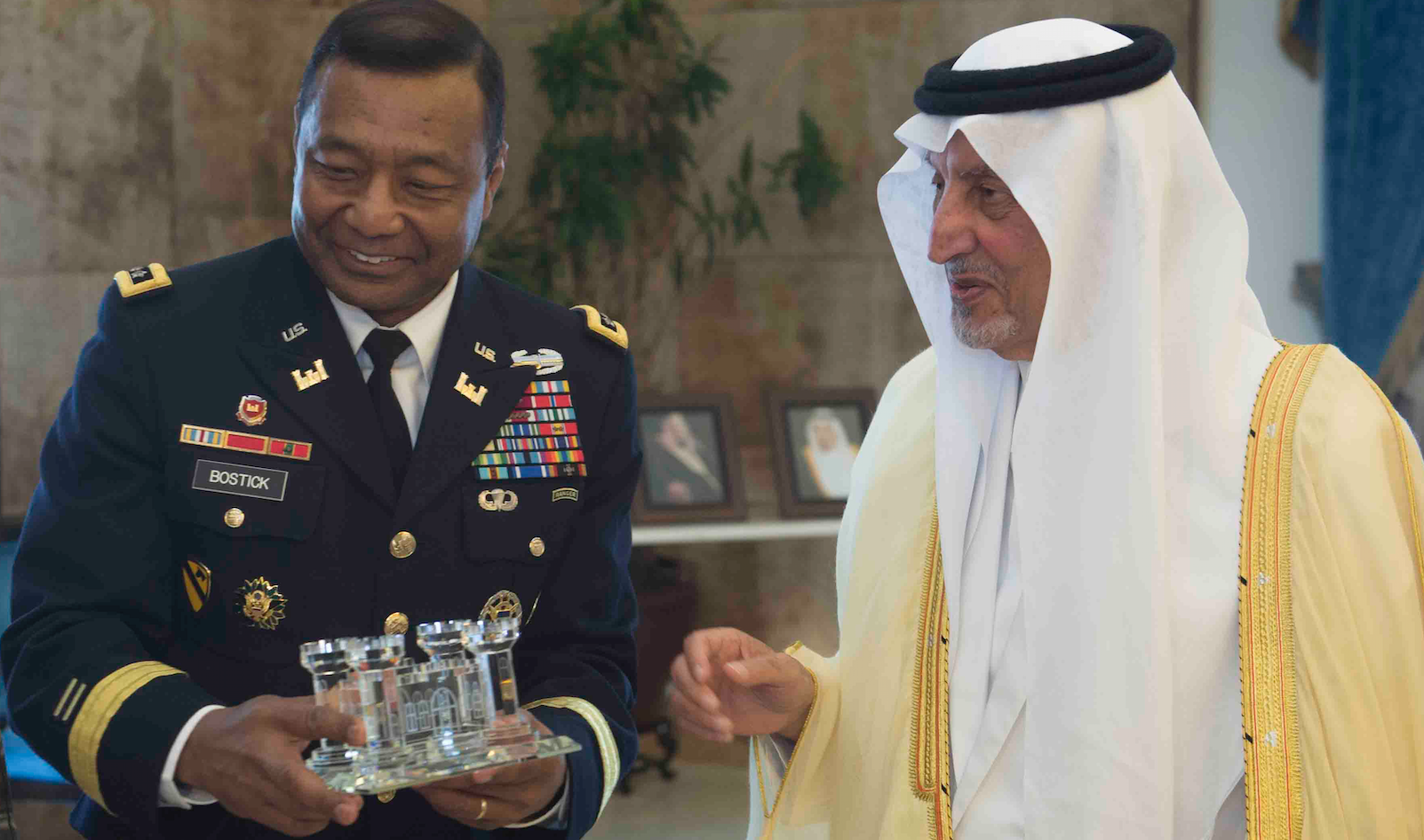
Bostick meets in Saudi Arabia with Prince Khalid bin Faisal Al Saud

In other projects, the Corps of Engineers obligated over $25 billion annually. During his tenure as Chief of Engineers, the Corps completed the $1.35 billion Inner Harbor Navigation Canal Borgne Surge Barrier in New Orleans. This was the largest design-build project in the 243-year history of the Corps, and it won the 2014 ASCE Most Outstanding Civil Engineering Achievement Award. Bostick worked with Congress, the Office of Management and Budget and the communities of Fargo-Moorhead to complete the first and only flood risk management Public Private Partnership.

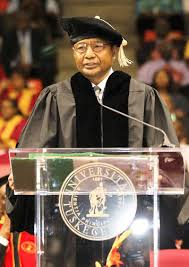

Bostick has appeared on CNN, FOX News, CBS Evening News, CBS Sunday Morning, the Daily Show. He has spoken extensively on resilience including remarks at the United Nations, Risk Analysis World Congress in Singapore, and the National Academy of Sciences. In 2014, Bostick provided the commencement address at Tuskegee University, and he was awarded an honorary doctorate degree in engineering.

=== Post-military career ===
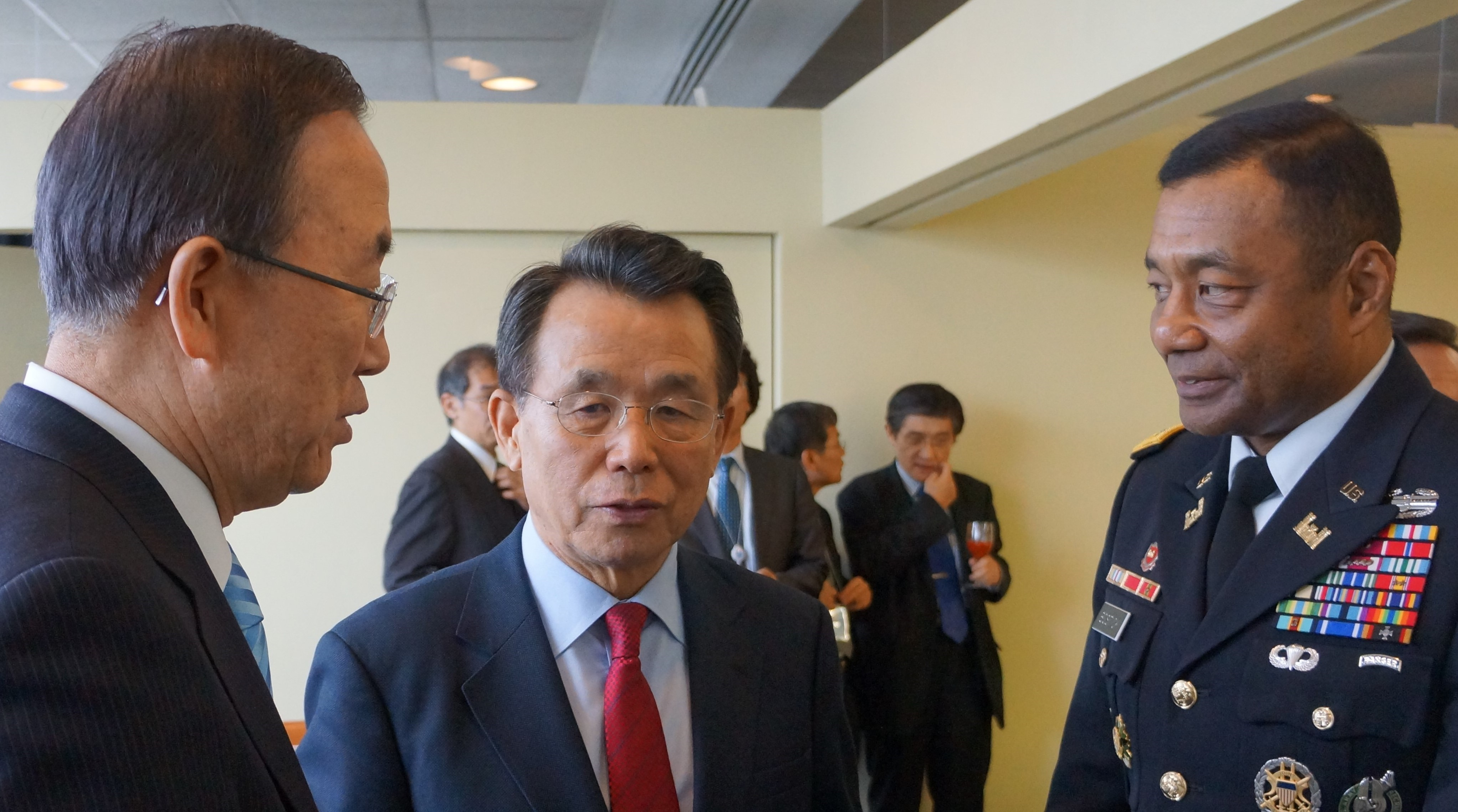
Bostick speaks at UN and meets with UN Secretary-General Ban Ki-Moon and former Korean President, Han Seung-soo

Following his military career Bostick joined Intrexon Corporation serving as the Senior Vice President of the Environment Sector. In this role, Bostick oversaw the company's strategies and programs to deploy biologically based solutions for the protection and remediation of the environment. In November 2017, Intrexon announced the appointment of Bostick as Chief Operating Officer responsible for overseeing operations across the company's multiple technology divisions, driving efficiency and effectiveness in the application of the company's assets toward its development projects. In April 2019, Intrexon announced the appointment of Bostick as the President of Intrexon Bioengineering, which seeks to address global challenges across food, agriculture, environmental, energy, and industrial fields by advancing biologically engineered solutions to improve sustainability and efficiency. Bostick departed Intrexon in February 2020.

In 2017, Bostick was elected a member of the National Academy of Construction and the George Washington University School of Engineering and Applied Science Hall of Fame for his many contributions to engineering. He was also elected a member of the National Academy of Engineering in 2017 for development of new approaches to hurricane protection and for leadership of the US Army Corps of Engineers.

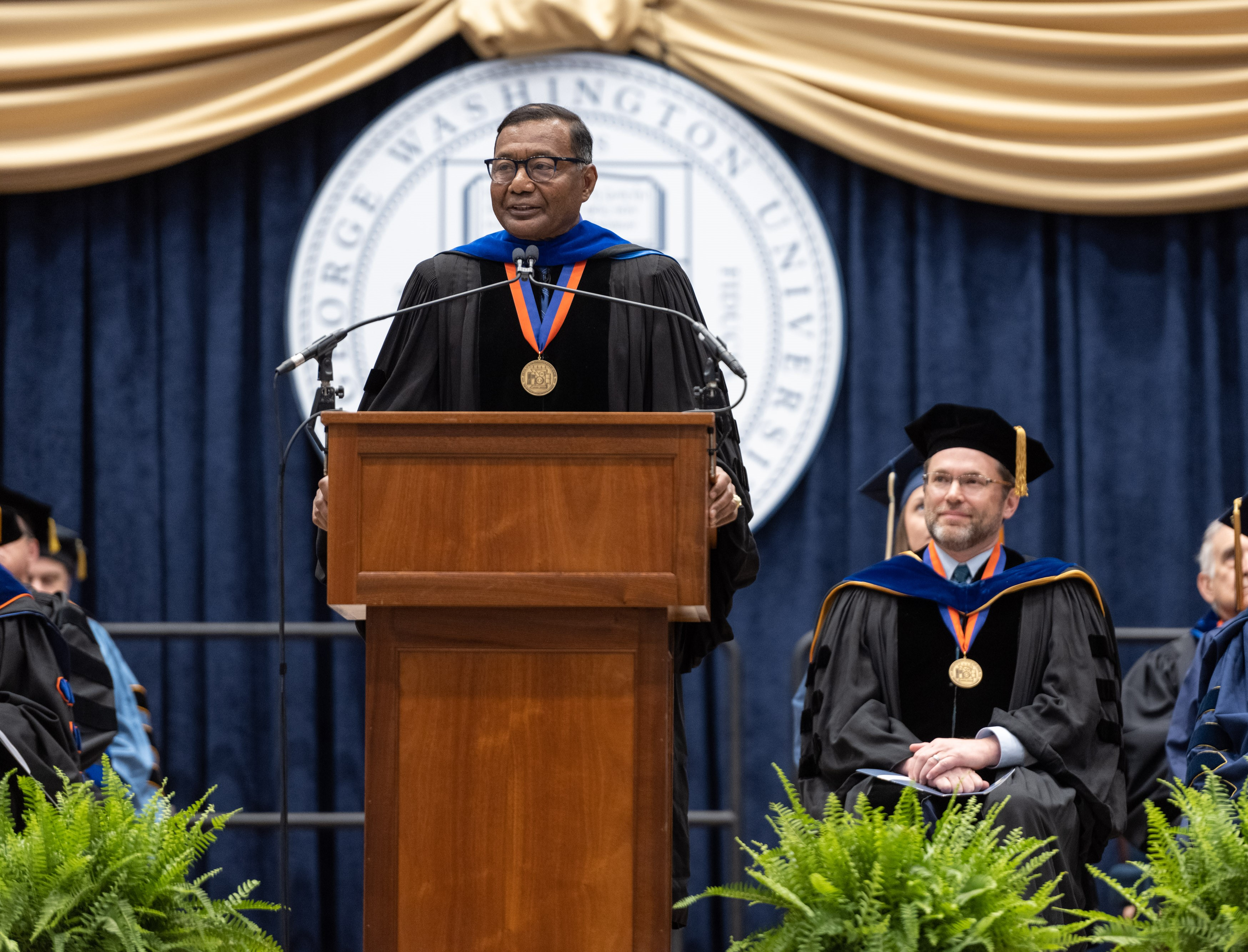
2023 GWU SEAS Graduation Remarks

On February 12, 2021, Bostick was appointed to the Congressionally-mandated Commission on the Naming of Items of the Department of Defense that Commemorate the Confederate States of America or Any Person Who Served Voluntarily with the Confederate States of America.

Bostick provided the 2023 commencement remarks at the George Washington University School of Engineering and Applied Science.

== Awards and decorations ==
Bostick has been awarded the following decorations and badges:

- Distinguished Service Medal
- Defense Superior Service Medal
- Legion of Merit (with two Oak Leaf Clusters)
- Bronze Star Medal
- Defense Meritorious Service Medal
- Meritorious Service Medal (with four Oak Leaf Clusters)
- Joint Service Commendation Medal
- Army Commendation Medal
- Army Achievement Medal (with Oak Leaf Cluster)
- Combat Action Badge
- United States Parachutist Badge
- Army Recruiter Badge
- Ranger Tab
- Joint Chiefs of Staff Identification Badge
- Army Staff Identification Badge
- Elected to the National Academy of Engineering (2017)

Military offices
Preceded by Merdith W. B. Temple	Chief of Engineers; 2012—2016	Succeeded by Todd T. Semonite
