= Henry J. Hatch =

United States Army general

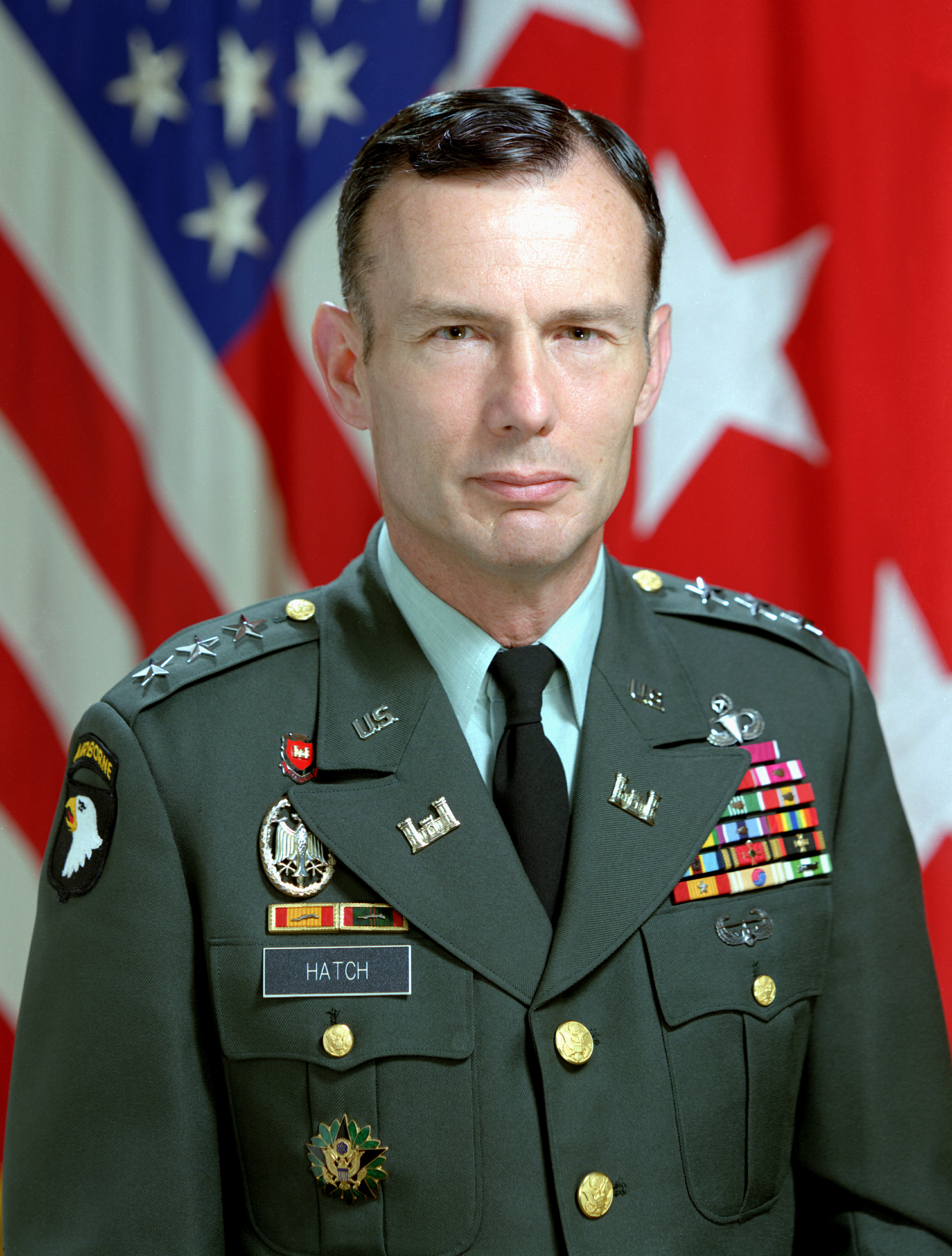
- Lieutenant General Henry J. Hatch
- Born: August 31, 1935 (age 91); Pensacola, Florida
- Education: United States Military Academy (BS); Ohio State University (MS)
- Military career
- Allegiance: United States
- Branch: United States Army
- Service years: 1957–1992
- Rank: Lieutenant General
- Nickname: Hank
- Commands: Chief of Engineers

Lieutenant General Henry James Hatch (born August 31, 1935) served as Chief of Engineers for the United States Army from June 17, 1988 – June 4, 1992.

Hatch was elected a member of the National Academy of Engineering in 1992 for leadership in the engineering and construction programs of the U.S. Army Corps of Engineers, and for exceptional management of its programs.

== Early life and education ==
The son of an artillery officer, Henry J. Hatch was born on August 31, 1935, in Pensacola, Florida. After graduating from the United States Military Academy in 1957 with a B.S. degree in engineering, he completed airborne and ranger training at Fort Benning, Georgia, and later earned an M.S. in geodetic science at Ohio State University in 1964.

== Military career ==
Hatch held several leadership positions in Army airborne and airmobile units early in his career. He commanded a company of the 307th Engineer Battalion, 82d Airborne Division, at Fort Bragg, North Carolina; served on the staff of the 2d Airborne Battle Group, 503d Infantry, in Okinawa; and commanded the 326th Engineer Battalion, 101st Airborne Division, in Vietnam in 1968–69. Hatch subsequently oversaw West Point construction work for the Corps' New York District and in 1974 began a three-year tenure as Nashville District Engineer. He then returned to Asia to lead the 2d Infantry Division Support Command in Korea and later directed Army and Air Force construction in Korea, Japan, and the Pacific as the Corps' Pacific Ocean Division Engineer. Hatch was Deputy Chief of Staff, Engineer, for U.S. Army, Europe, in 1981–84. He next served briefly as Assistant Chief of Engineers and then for nearly four years as Director of Civil Works. President Reagan appointed him Chief of Engineers in May 1988.

== Post-Military career ==
In 2012, Hatch joined Dawson & Associates in Washington, DC as a senior advisor focusing on federal environmental and water permitting policy.

== Awards and decorations ==
Hatch's military awards included:

| Distinguished Service Medal with one Oak Leaf Cluster |
| Legion of Merit |
| Bronze Star with Oak Leaf Cluster |
| Order of Military Merit (Commander, 1992; Brazil) |
| Meritorious Service Medal with Oak Leaf Cluster |

Military offices
| Preceded by Elvin R. Heiberg III | Chief of Engineers; 1988—1992 | Succeeded by Arthur E. Williams |
