= William C. Gribble Jr. =

United States Army general

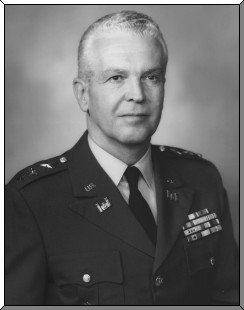
- Lieutenant General William C. Gribble Jr.
- Born: May 24, 1917; Ironwood, Michigan
- Died: June 2, 1979 (aged 62); Fort Belvoir, Virginia
- Military career
- Allegiance: United States of America
- Branch: United States Army
- Service years: 1941–1976
- Rank: Lieutenant General
- Service number: 0-23695
- Unit: United States Army Corps of Engineers
- Commands: Chief of Engineers
- Conflicts: World War II
- Awards: Army Distinguished Service Medal (2); Legion of Merit (2)

William Charles Gribble Jr. (born May 24, 1917, in Ironwood, Michigan – June 2, 1979) graduated from the United States Military Academy in 1941 and was commissioned in the Corps of Engineers.

During World War II, he served on the staff of the 340th Engineer General Service Regiment as it first built a section of the Alaska Highway in western Canada and later assisted MacArthur's drive in New Guinea and the Philippines. At the end of the war he commanded the 118th Engineer Combat Battalion, U.S. 43d Infantry Division.

Gribble then worked in the Los Alamos laboratory and in the Reactor Development Division of the U.S. Atomic Energy Commission. As Alaska District Engineer he oversaw construction of a nuclear power plant at Fort Greely, Alaska. He headed the Army's nuclear power program in 1960–61. In 1963 he was the Corps' North Central Division Engineer. Gribble's scientific skills led to his service as Director of Research and Development in the U.S. Army Materiel Command in 1964-66 and as the Army's Chief of Research and Development in 1971–73. In 1969-70 he commanded the Army Engineer Center and Fort Belvoir and was Commandant of the Army Engineer School. He became Chief of Engineers in 1973, and retired in 1976.

Gribble received a master's degree in physical science from the University of Chicago in 1948 and an honorary doctorate in engineering from Michigan Technological University. He was also an honorary member of the United Kingdom's Institute of Royal Engineers. His decorations included the Distinguished Service Medal with Oak Leaf Cluster, the Legion of Merit with Oak Leaf Cluster and the Brazilian Order of Military Merit. General Gribble died at Fort Belvoir, Virginia, on June 2, 1979. He is interred in Arlington National Cemetery in Arlington, Virginia.

== Trivia ==
- On May 2, 1975, at a ceremony commemorating the 200th anniversary of the Corps, General Gribble began the tradition of the Gold Castles insignia of General Douglas MacArthur (who began his career serving the Corps) to be worn by the Chief of Engineers, forming the basis for the current "Castle" logo of the Corps as well.

Military offices
Preceded by Frederick J. Clarke	Chief of Engineers; 1973—1976	Succeeded by John W. Morris
