= Joe N. Ballard =

United States Army general

Joe Nathan Ballard
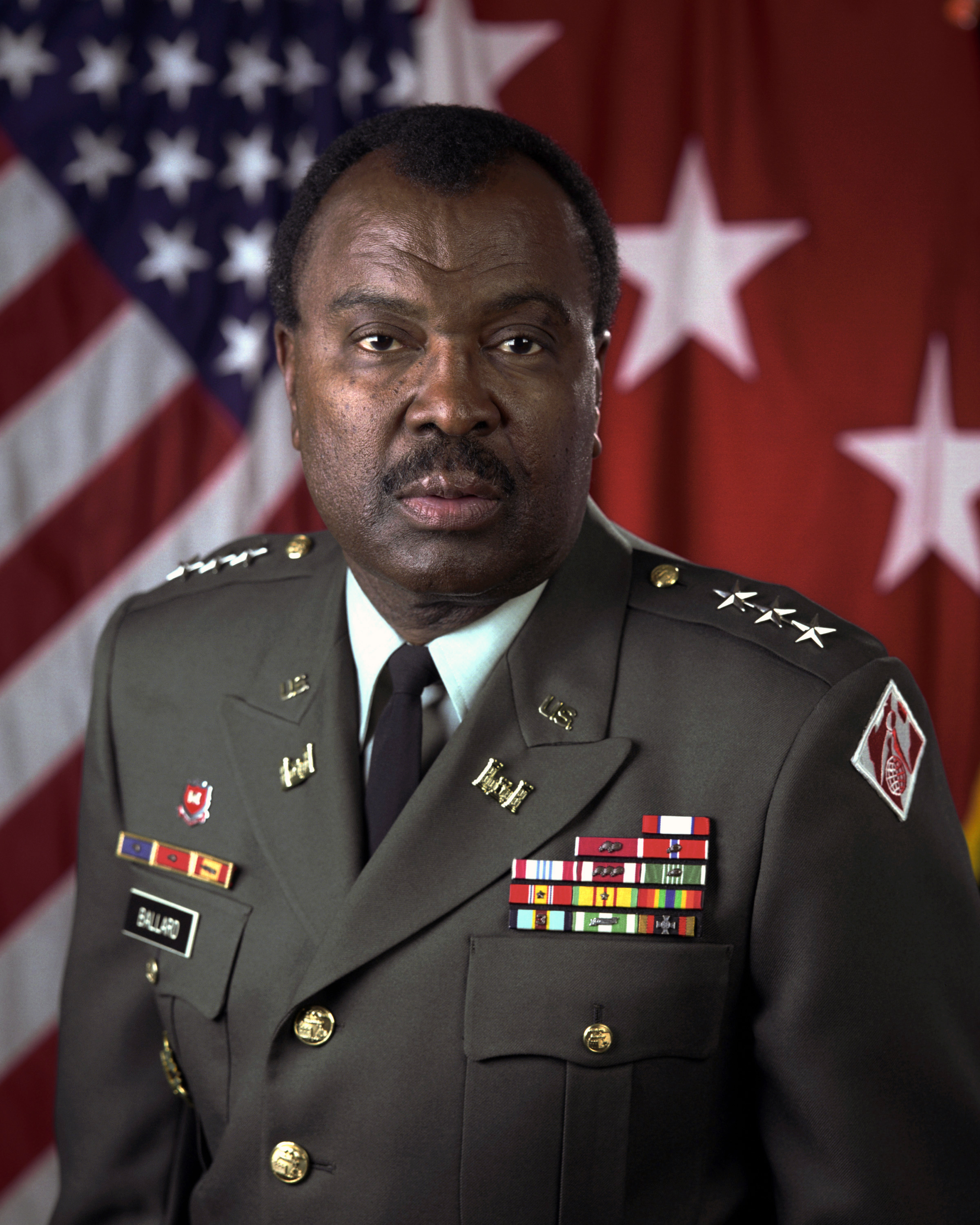
- Lieutenant General Joe N. Ballard, Chief of Engineers 1996-2000
- Born: March 27, 1942 (age 84); Oakdale, Louisiana, U.S.
- Military career
- Allegiance: United States
- Branch: United States Army
- Service years: 1965–2000
- Rank: Lieutenant General
- Commands: Chief of Engineers
- Wars: Vietnam War
- Awards: Army Distinguished Service Medal

Lieutenant General Joe Nathan Ballard (born March 27, 1942) is a former U.S. Army officer who fought in the Vietnam War, and who served as Chief of Engineers, the first African-American to serve in this role.

== Early life ==
A native of Oakdale, Louisiana, Ballard was born on March 27, 1942. He graduated in 1965 from Southern University and A&M College, Baton Rouge, Louisiana, with a degree in electrical engineering after which he received a commission in the Corps of Engineers.

== Military career ==
Ballard served as a platoon leader in the 84th Engineer Battalion during his first tour of duty in South Vietnam. He then returned to the United States and commanded a training company at Fort Polk. Later, he attended the Engineer Officer Advanced Course at Fort Belvoir before returning for his second tour in Vietnam as a company commander in the 864th Engineer Battalion and as the Chief, Lines of Communication Section in the 18th Engineer Brigade (Airborne). Following assignments with the Fifth U.S. Army and the Recruiting Command, he was Operations Officer and Executive Officer of the 326th Engineer Battalion, 101st Airborne Division.

In 1978 he went to South Korea where he served as Operations Officer and later as the Executive Officer on the staff of the U.S. Forces, Korea, Engineer. Following Korea he returned to the Pentagon for duty on the Army Staff as the principal engineer in the Army Energy Office, Office of the Deputy Chief of Staff, Logistics.

In 1982 he moved to another overseas theater as Commander of the 82d Engineer Battalion, 7th Engineer Brigade, in West Germany. Later he became the Commander of the 18th Engineer Brigade and Assistant Deputy Chief of Staff, Engineer, in Headquarters, U.S. Army Europe.

Returning to the United States in 1991, Ballard became the Assistant Commandant of the U.S. Army Engineer School and Deputy Commanding General of the Engineer Center and Fort Leonard Wood, Missouri. After another assignment in the Pentagon as Chief, Total Army Basing Study in the Office of the Chief of Staff of the Army, he returned to Missouri as Commanding General of the Engineer Center and Fort Leonard Wood.

When Ballard was nominated by President Bill Clinton to be the Chief of Engineers and Commander, United States Army Corps of Engineers, he was serving as Chief of Staff, U.S. Army Training and Doctrine Command in Fort Monroe, Virginia. Ballard served as Chief of Engineers from October 1, 1996 until his retirement on August 2, 2000.

During his career, Lieutenant General Ballard earned a master's degree in engineering management from the University of Missouri–Rolla and graduated from the Engineer Officer Basic and Advanced Courses, the Command and General Staff College, and the Army War College.

=== Decorations and badges ===
- Army Distinguished Service Medal
- Legion of Merit (with 3 Oak Leaf Clusters)
- Bronze Star (with Oak Leaf Cluster)
- Defense Meritorious Service Medal
- Meritorious Service Medal (with 3 Oak Leaf Clusters)
- Army Commendation Medal (with Oak Leaf Cluster)
- Army Staff Identification Badge

== See also ==
List of USACE Chiefs of Engineers

Military offices
Preceded by Arthur E. Williams	Chief of Engineers; 1996—2000	Succeeded by Robert B. Flowers
