= Robert L. Van Antwerp Jr. =

United States Army general (born 1950)

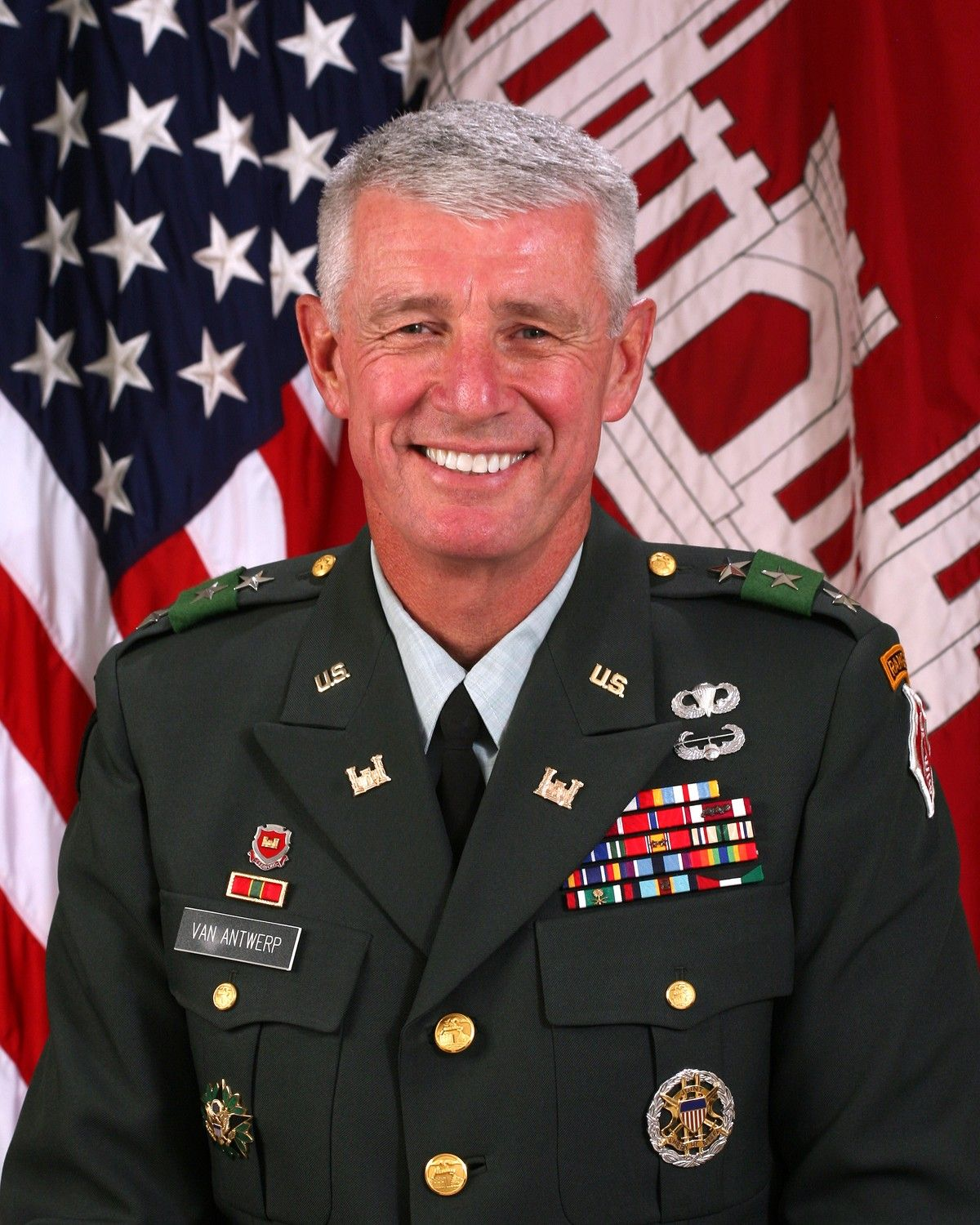
- Official portrait, 2007
- Born: January 27, 1950 (age 76); Benton Harbor, Michigan, U.S.
- Alma mater: United States Military Academy (BS); University of Michigan (MS); Long Island University (MBA)
- Military career
- Allegiance: United States
- Branch: United States Army
- Service years: 1972–2011
- Rank: Lieutenant general
- Commands: Chief of Engineers
- Conflicts: Gulf War

Robert L. Van Antwerp Jr. (born January 27, 1950) is a retired United States Army officer who served as the 52nd Chief of Engineers of the U.S Army and Commanding General of the U.S. Army Corps of Engineers.

== Early life ==
He was born in Benton Harbor, Michigan.

== Career ==
Antwerp speaking about the Army Strong ad campaign in 2006

Van Antwerp graduated from the United States Military Academy with a Bachelor of Science degree in 1972, where he was First Captain of Cadets. He completed Ranger, Airborne and Air Assault training and the Engineer Officer Basic and Advanced Courses. He holds a Master of Science degree in mechanical engineering from the University of Michigan and a Master of Business Administration degree from Long Island University in New York. He is also a Registered Professional Engineer. He happened to serve for a number of years as the President of Officer's Christian Fellowship.

Van Antwerp's previous assignment was as Commanding General, U.S. Army Accessions Command and Deputy Commanding General for Initial Military Training at Fort Monroe, Virginia. Additionally, Van Antwerp exercised Department of the Army directed executive agent authority over the United States Military Entrance Processing Command. Command assignments include CO, 326th Engineer Battalion, 101st Airborne Division (Air Assault) during the Gulf War; U.S. Army Maneuver Support Center and Fort Leonard Wood/Commandant, U.S. Army Engineer School; CO, Los Angeles District, U.S. Army Corps of Engineers during the Northridge earthquake of 1994; CG, South Atlantic Division, U.S. Army Corps of Engineers, Atlanta, Georgia.

Other assignments include Chief of Staff, U.S. Army Corps of Engineers; Assistant Chief of Staff for Installation Management, Washington, DC; Director, Office of Competitive Sourcing, Office of the Assistant Secretary of the Army (Research, Development and Acquisition), Washington, DC; Executive Assistant to the Vice Chairman of the Joint Chiefs of Staff, Washington, DC; Executive Office, Office of the Chief of Engineers, Washington, D.C.; Chief, Military Engineering and Construction Division, U.S. Army Western Command, Fort Shafter, Hawaii; Executive Officer, 84th Engineer Battalion, 45th General Support Group, Schofield Barracks, Hawaii; and Instructor, Department of Mechanics, U.S. Military Academy, West Point, New York.

== Later life ==
After retiring from military service, he joined the Board of Directors for the Michael Baker Corporation. He resigned from the board in March 2012 citing a potential conflict of interest.

Military offices
Preceded by Carl A. Strock	Chief of Engineers; 2007—2011	Succeeded by Merdith W. B. Temple
