= Arthur E. Williams =

United States Army general

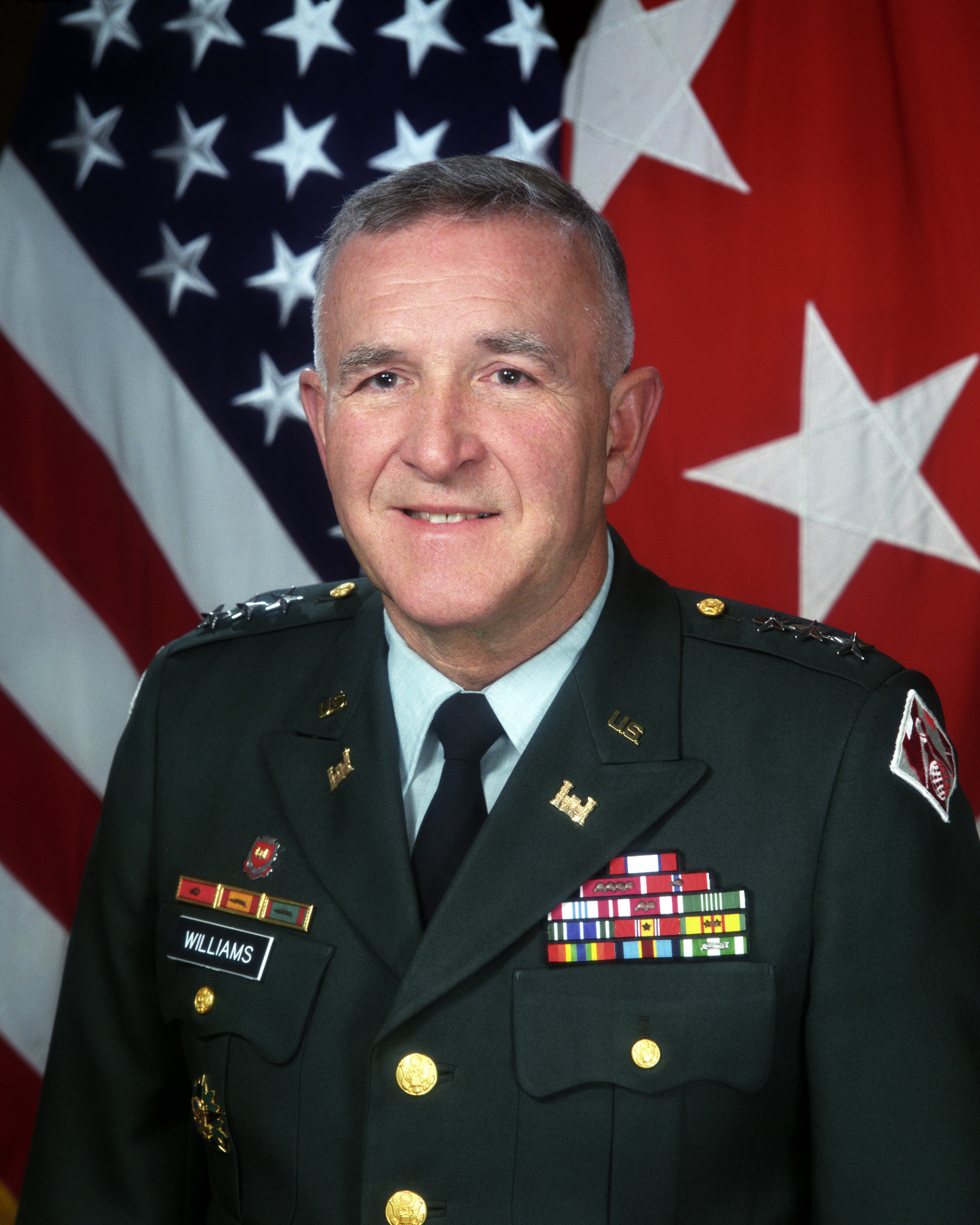
- Born: March 28, 1938 (age 88); Watertown, New York, U.S.
- Education: Saint Lawrence University
- Military career
- Allegiance: United States
- Branch: United States Army
- Rank: Lieutenant General
- Commands: Chief of Engineers

Arthur E. Williams is an American army officer. He obtained a commission as an Army engineer officer upon his graduation in 1960 from Saint Lawrence University, where he majored in mathematics. At St. Lawrence he was a member of Phi Sigma Kappa fraternity. He later obtained a bachelor's degree in civil engineering from Rensselaer Polytechnic Institute and a master's degree in civil engineering and economic planning from Stanford University.

Williams commanded an armored engineer company in West Germany and an engineer construction company in South Vietnam. During a second tour in South Vietnam, he served as Operations Officer of the 577th Engineer Battalion. He later commanded the 44th Engineer Battalion in South Korea and was an assignment officer at the Army Military Personnel Center. Williams headed the Corps' Sacramento District in 1982–85 and then served as Chief of Staff at Corps Headquarters. He subsequently headed the Pacific Ocean Division and then the Lower Mississippi Valley Division. He was also President of the Mississippi River Commission. He returned to Corps Headquarters in July 1991 as Director of Civil Works. President Bush appointed Williams Chief of Engineers in 1992.

After retiring from the Army, he joined Dawson & Associates in Washington, DC as a federal permitting advisor.

== Military awards ==
- Legion of Merit with two Oak Leaf Clusters
- Bronze Star with Oak Leaf Cluster
- Defense Meritorious Service Medal

Military offices
Preceded by Henry J. Hatch	Chief of Engineers; 1992—1996	Succeeded by Joe N. Ballard
