= Elvin R. Heiberg III =

United States Army general (1932–2013)

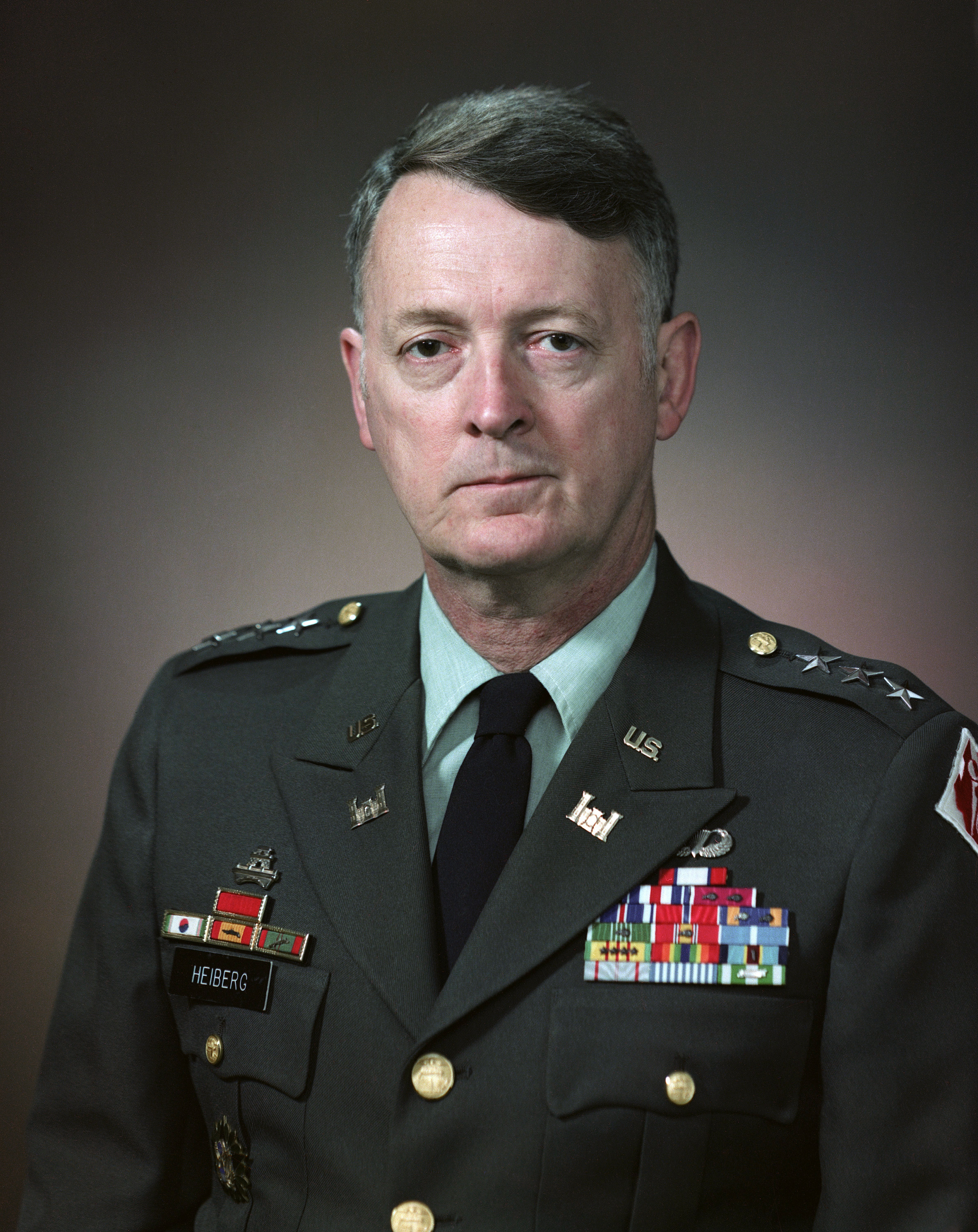
- Lieutenant General Elvin R. Heiberg III
- Born: March 2, 1932; Schofield Barracks, Hawaii
- Died: September 27, 2013 (aged 81); Arlington County, Virginia
- Education: United States Military Academy
- Military career
- Allegiance: United States
- Branch: United States Army
- Service years: 1953-1988
- Rank: Lieutenant General
- Nickname: Vald
- Commands: Chief of Engineers

Elvin Ragnvald "Vald" Heiberg III (March 2, 1932 – September 27, 2013) was a United States Army general. He was Chief of Engineers between 1984 and 1988.

== Awards and decorations ==
Heiberg's military awards include;

- Army Distinguished Service Medal with Oak Leaf Cluster
- Silver Star
- Legion of Merit with two Oak Leaf Clusters,
- Distinguished Flying Cross
- Bronze Star
- Air Medal with six Oak Leaf Clusters
- Army commendation one Oak leaf cluster
- National Defense service medal one Oak Leaf cluster
- Korean war service medal
- Vietnam service medal four bronze stars
- Army service Ribbon
- Army Overseas Service Ribbon Numeral one
- Vietnam Technical Service Honors Medal First class
- United Nations medal Korea
- Republic of Vietnam Campaign Medal with 1960– Device
- Order of the Crown (Belgium) (Commander)
- Order of Military Merit (Brazil) (Grand Commander)

== See also ==
Military offices
Preceded by Joseph K. Bratton	Chief of Engineers; 1984—1988	Succeeded by Henry J. Hatch
