= Corps Castle =

Logo of the US Army Corps of Engineers

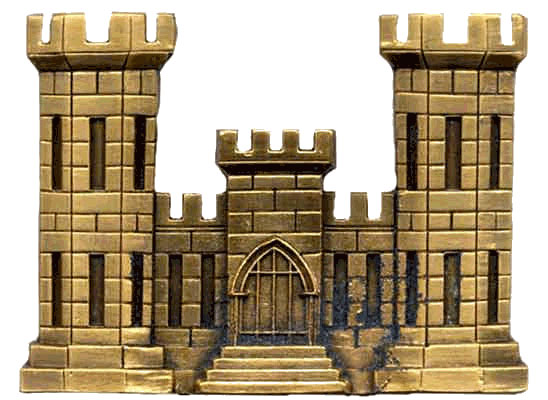
The U.S. Army Corps of Engineers gold castle branch insignia, worn by engineer officers.

Corps Castle is the logo of the U.S. Army Corps of Engineers (USACE). The logo is typically a white castle with three towers set on a red background. When the Corps Castle is worn as insignia on a uniform, it is similar to the logo design but with a dull or shiny brass finish. The look of the Corps Castle traces its history back to the American Revolution and has evolved over time. The logo has received changes throughout the years but gets its finalizing shape from the United States Military Academy Barracks named Pershing Barracks.

== Background ==
The medieval castle as a logo was started in 1840 on an informal basis. Beginning in 1841, cadets at the United States Military Academy at West Point, New York wore personal insignia of this type known as Gold Castles on their uniforms as they became commissioned officers in the U.S. Army. In 1902, the Corps Castle was formally adopted by the Army as the insignia of the Corps of Engineers. On formal and semi-formal uniforms, the logo is customarily gold in color, although it was changed to silver from gold from 1894–1921. When displayed on combat uniforms for special events, it is customarily black in color. In visual color media, the Corps Castle logo is customarily presented in red and white colors.

== History and origins ==
The turreted castle was adapted as the symbol of the Engineers, due it representing the two primary responsibilities of an Engineer, offense, and defense.

=== French connection ===
U.S. Army Corps of Engineers (USACE) logo

As a consequence, many speculative stories about the origins of the engineers have been advanced. One story traces the origins to a French connection. During the American Revolution, the Continental Army filled its necessity for trained military engineers by either borrowing them from France or having French engineers volunteer for service in the Continental Army. Stories about castle origins credit these French engineers, in particular, General Louis Lebegue Duportail, Chief Engineer, Continental Army, 22 July 1777 – 10 Oct. 1783, with a design based on a castle-style fortification in Verdun, France. These French engineers disappeared from the scene before the castle design appeared in the American Army.

=== Williams explanation ===
While there may be some truth to the French connection, the origins are also attributed to Colonel Jonathan Williams and a member of his staff, Alexander Macomb. Williams—grandnephew of Benjamin Franklin—assisted Franklin during his tenure as envoy to France during the American Revolution. After the war, he adopted engineering as a profession. In 1801, Williams was a major, Corps Artillerists engineer, and Inspector of Fortifications. In 1802, President Thomas Jefferson appointed him commander of the newly created Corps of Engineers and the U.S. Military Academy at West Point. Thus, he was the first Chief Engineer and First Superintendent of West Point of the reestablished Corps.

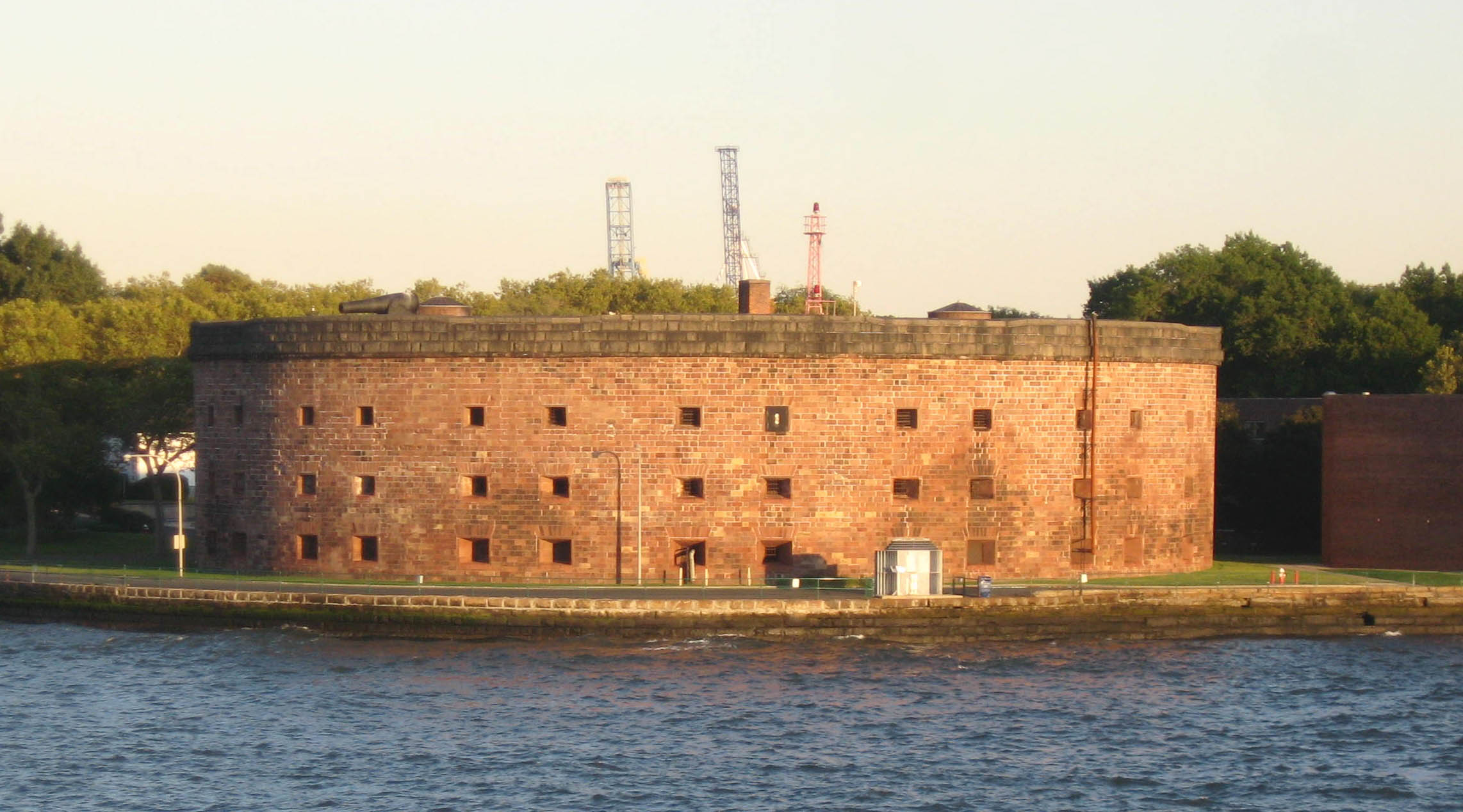
Castle Williams

Through his work as Chief Engineer, there is a clue as to who designed the Corps insignia. Between 1807 and 1812, he designed and constructed Castle Williams to defend New York Harbor. The gateway to that castle-style fortification bore an eagle over the center. Other examples included Castle Pinckney in Charleston, South Carolina and Castle Clinton, which also defended New York Harbor. An assistant on his staff was Colonel Alexander Macomb, who became the Chief Engineer, 1 June 1821 through 24 May 1828. In 1828, he was elevated to Commanding General of the U.S. Army.

In 1807, he made the earliest known drawing of the Engineer Button adorned with a castle motif, worn on the uniforms of the West Point cadets during the War of 1812. Another engineer officer—Colonel Richard Delafield, superintendent of the military academy—added the turreted castle to the new uniform for the West Point cadets in 1838.

Macomb—as Commanding General of the U.S. Army—had an active part in the design of the new uniform. The castle was also a major element in the architectural design of the buildings at West Point, as typified by the old library built in 1841 that survived until 1961, when it was torn down. Delafield supervised the design and construction of the buildings destroyed by the fire, including the old library.

From the evidence, one would conclude that Williams and Macomb, both familiar with French military tradition and heraldry, designed not only the Corps castle emblem but also the Essayons button. Although Macomb's design appeared in 1807, the authoritative description of the button appeared in February 1840, in General Orders 7, AGO: 'Essayons,’ a bastion with embrasures in the distance, surrounded by water, and the rising sun, the figures to be of dead gold upon a bright field". While the designs of the emblem and the button have changed, the castle remains a distinctive symbol of the U.S. Army Corps of Engineers.

Captain Alden Partridge, Acting Superintendent of the United States Military Academy from 1808–1817, was described by General George D. Ramsey: "Captain Partridge was never known to be without his uniform... His was that of the Corps of Engineers with embroidered cuffs and the Essayons button..."

== United States Marine Corps ==
The Marine Corps adapted the Corps Castle for the insignia of the 1st, 2nd, and 3rd Combat Engineer Battalions. When the 18th Naval Construction Battalion was re-designated 3rd Battalion 18th Marines they also adapted the Corps Castle.

== See also ==
- Gold Castles
