= Carl A. Strock =

United States Army general

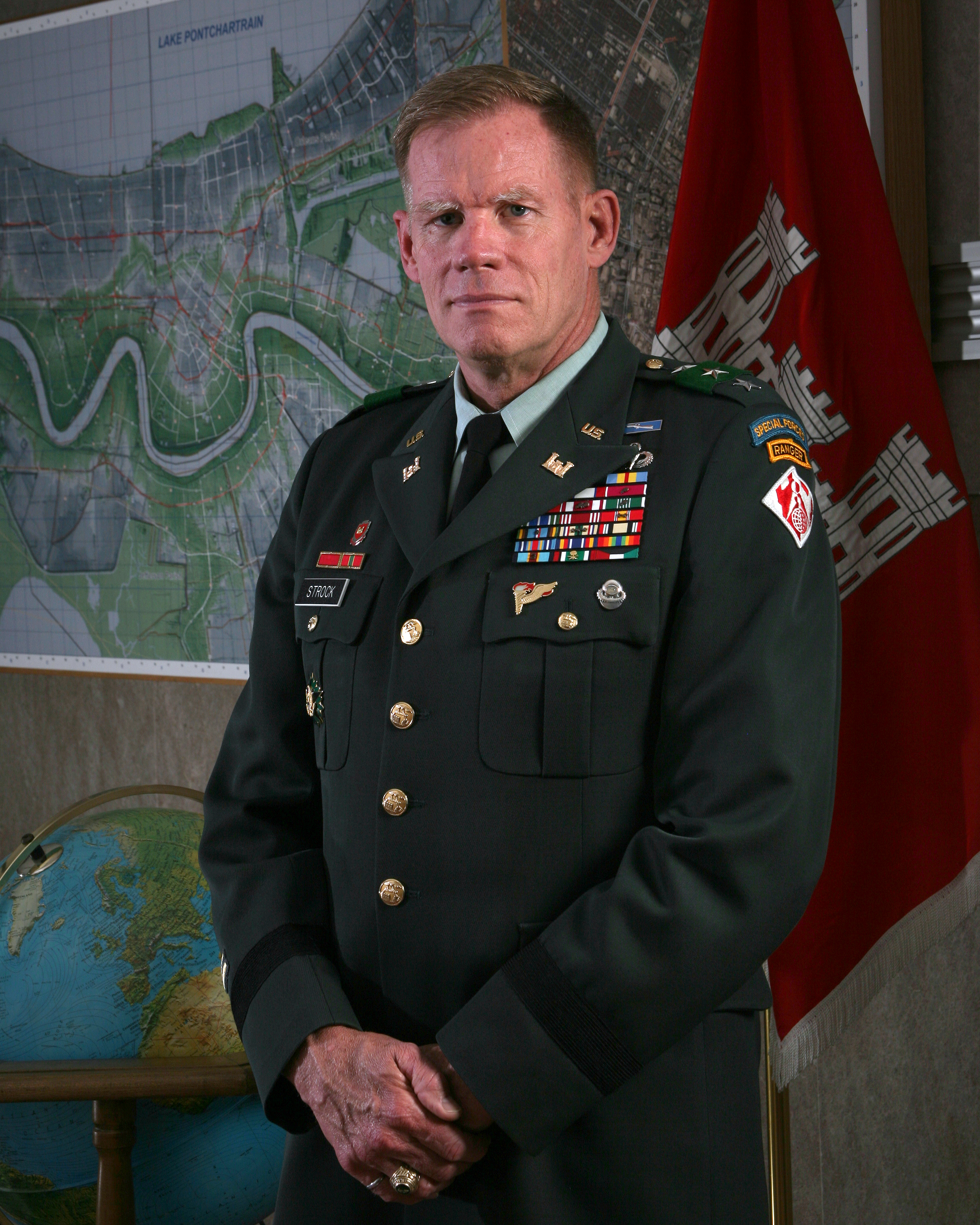
- Official portrait, 2007
- Born: 1948 (age 77–78); Georgia, U.S.
- Education: Virginia Military Institute
- Military career
- Allegiance: United States
- Branch: United States Army
- Service years: 1972-2007
- Rank: Lieutenant General
- Commands: Chief of Engineers
- Conflicts: Operation Just Cause; Operation Desert Storm
- Awards: Ranger Tab; Special Forces Tab; Defense Distinguished Service Medal; Army Distinguished Service Medal

Carl Ames Strock (born c. 1948) is a retired United States Army officer who formerly served as Chief of Engineers and the Commanding General of the United States Army Corps of Engineers. Born in Georgia to an Army family, he enlisted in the Army and received his commission as an infantry second lieutenant following graduation from Officer Candidate School in 1972. After completing Ranger and Special Forces training, he served primarily with infantry units before transferring to the Engineer Branch of the U.S. Army in 1983. He holds a Bachelor of Science degree in civil engineering from the Virginia Military Institute and a master's degree in civil engineering from Mississippi State University. He is a Registered Professional Engineer.

Prior to his selection as the Chief of Engineers and Commanding General of the U.S. Army Corps of Engineers, he served as Director of Civil Works, Headquarters, U.S. Army Corps of Engineers. In September 2003, he returned from a six-month tour of duty in Iraq as the Deputy Director of Operations for the Coalition Provisional Authority. His previous assignment was Director of Military Programs, Headquarters, U.S. Army Corps of Engineers.

As the Chief of Engineers, Strock was at the center of attention concerning issues surrounding the flooding of New Orleans after Hurricane Katrina in 2005. In June 2006, General Strock accepted responsibility on behalf of the Corps for the failure of the flood protection, calling it "a system in name only."

Strock stepped down as the Chief of Engineers and retired in 2007. He was replaced by LTG Robert L. Van Antwerp Jr. on 5 March 2007 as the 52nd Chief of Engineers. He joined Bechtel in 2007 and is principal vice president, serving as project director of the U.S. Department of Energy uranium processing facility at Oak Ridge, TN. Strock is a emeritus member of the National Academy of Construction.

== Commands held ==
Strock's command assignments include:

- U.S. Army Corps of Engineers Northwestern Division;
- U.S. Army Corps of Engineers Pacific Ocean Division;
- Engineer Brigade, 24th Infantry Division, Fort Stewart, Georgia;
- 307th Engineer Battalion, 82nd Airborne Division, where he led the battalion through Operation Just Cause in Panama and Operation Desert Shield and Desert Storm in Saudi Arabia and Iraq;
- Rifle Company Commander, 1st Battalion (Mechanized), 26th Infantry Regiment, 1st Infantry Division (Forward) in Germany;
- Operational Detachment Commander, 2nd Battalion, 5th Special Forces Group at Fort Bragg, North Carolina.

Other assignments include:

- Chief of Staff, U.S. Army Engineer Training Center and Fort Leonard Wood, Missouri;
- Personnel Staff Officer, Army Deputy Chief of Staff for Personnel, Washington, D.C.;
- Colonels Assignment Officer, U.S. Army Personnel Command, Washington D.C.;
- Exchange Officer and Instructor, Royal School of Military Engineering in England;
- Battalion Operations Officer, Assistant Division Engineer, and Battalion Executive Officer for the 307th Engineer Battalion, 82nd Airborne Division;
- Resident Engineer, Columbus Air Force Base, Mississippi;
- Project Officer, Tennessee- Tombigbee Waterway, Mississippi and Alabama;
- Scout Platoon Leader and Company Executive Officer, 1st Battalion (Airborne), 505th Parachute Infantry Regiment, 82nd Airborne Division.

Military offices
Preceded by Robert B. Flowers	Chief of Engineers; 2004—2007	Succeeded by Robert L. Van Antwerp Jr.
