= Joseph K. Bratton =

United States Army general

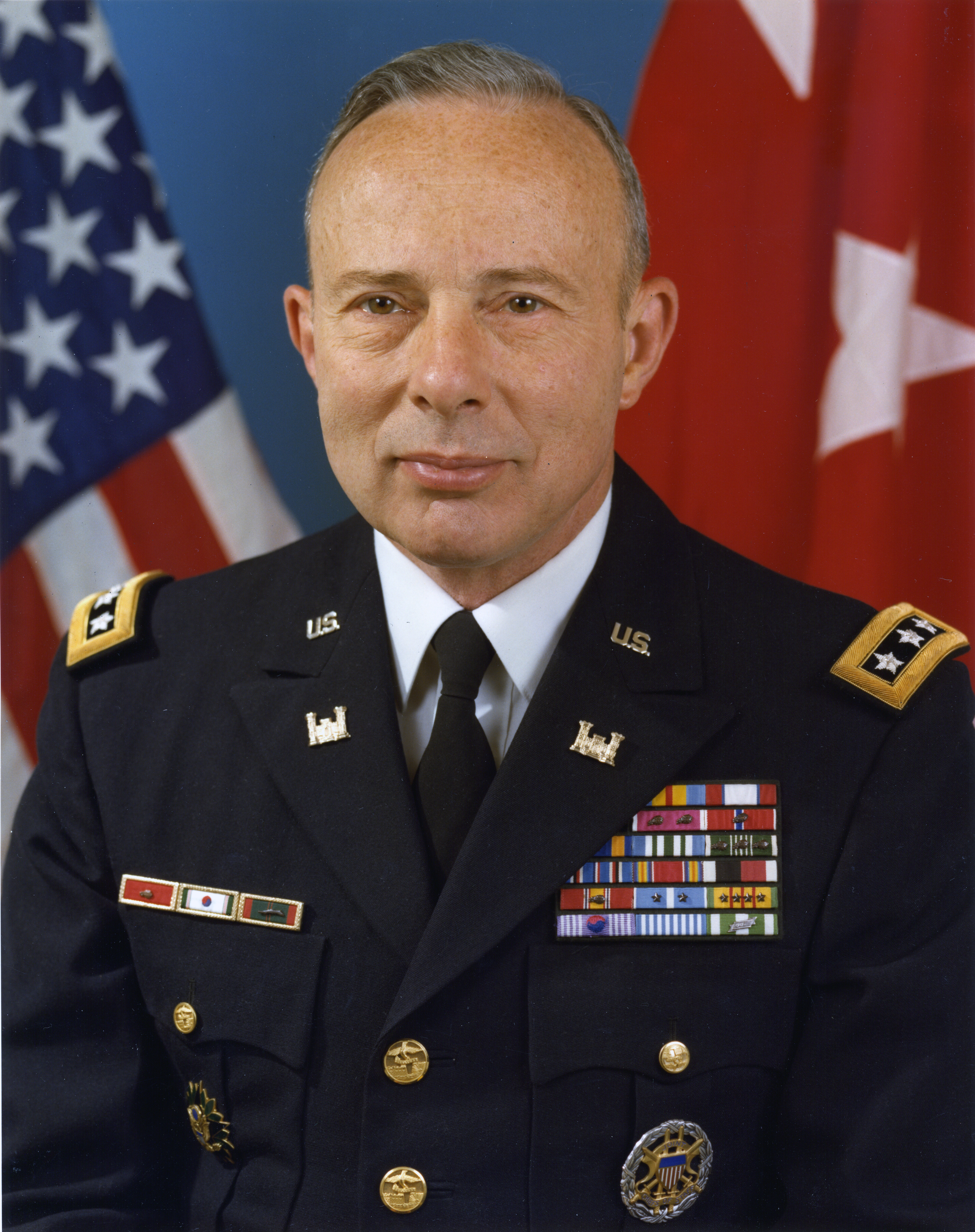
- Born: April 4, 1926; St. Paul, Minnesota, U.S.
- Died: June 2, 2007 (aged 81); McLean, Virginia, U.S.
- Burial place: Arlington National Cemetery
- Military career
- Allegiance: United States
- Branch: United States Army
- Service years: 1948–1984
- Rank: Lieutenant General
- Commands: Chief of Engineers
- Conflicts: World War II; Korean War; Vietnam War
- Awards: Defense Distinguished Service Medal; Distinguished Service Medal; Legion of Merit (2); Bronze Star (2)

Lieutenant General Joseph K. Bratton (April 4, 1926 – June 2, 2007) was an American Army officer and nuclear engineer.

== Biography ==
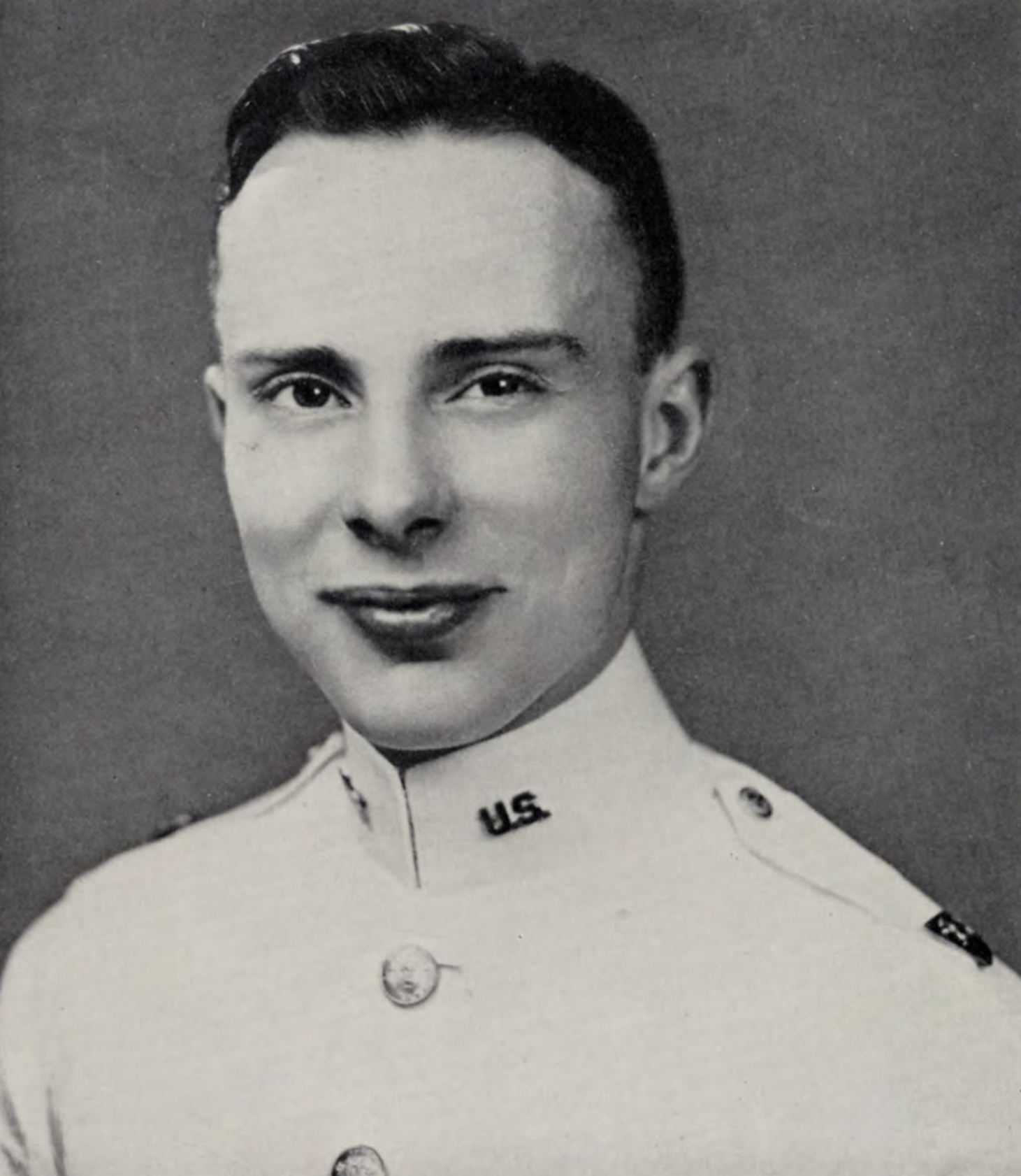
Bratton as a United States Military Academy cadet c. 1948

Bratton was born in St. Paul, Minnesota. He graduated third in the class of 1948 at the United States Military Academy and was commissioned in the Corps of Engineers. He served with an engineer battalion in Austria from 1949 to 1952 and with the divisional 13th Engineer Combat Battalion in Korea in 1953 and 1954, both before and after the armistice there. Likewise, he later commanded the 24th Engineer Battalion, 4th Armored Division, in Germany (1964–65) and the 159th Engineer Group in Vietnam (1969–70). Bratton also held numerous staff assignments. He was a military assistant to Secretary of the Army Stanley Resor from 1967 to 1969 and secretary to the Joint Chiefs of Staff from 1970 to 1972. Having received a master's degree in nuclear engineering from the Massachusetts Institute of Technology in 1959, Bratton served as Chief of Nuclear Activities, Supreme Headquarters, Allied Powers, Europe (SHAPE), from 1972 to 1975 and Director of Military Applications at the U.S. Department of Energy from 1975 to 1979. Note - the U.S. Department of Energy was called the "United States Energy Research and Development Administration" at this time, not the current name of Department of Energy (DOE). His last assignments before becoming Chief of Engineers in October 1980 were as Division Engineer of the Corps' South Atlantic Division (1979–80) and then briefly as Deputy Chief of Engineers.

Bratton died on June 2, 2007, of Parkinson's disease, at the age of 81 in Virginia. His wife had preceded him in death in 2006. He, alongside his wife, are interred in Arlington National Cemetery in Arlington, Virginia.

== Awards and decorations ==
His military awards included;

1st row	Defense Distinguished Service Medal			
2nd row	Army Distinguished Service Medal	Legion of Merit w/ 2 bronze OLCs	Bronze Star w/ OLC	Joint Service Commendation Medal
3rd row	Army Commendation Medal w/ three OLCs	Army Achievement Medal	World War II Victory Medal	Army of Occupation Medal
4th row	National Defense Service Medal w/ service star	Korea Service Medal w/ two service stars	Vietnam Service Medal w/ four service stars	Army Service Ribbon
5th row	Army Overseas Service Ribbon	Armed Forces Honor Medal (1st class)	United Nations Korea Medal	Vietnam Campaign Medal

Military offices
Preceded by John W. Morris	Chief of Engineers; 1980–1984	Succeeded by Elvin R. Heiberg III
