= Robert B. Flowers =

United States Army general

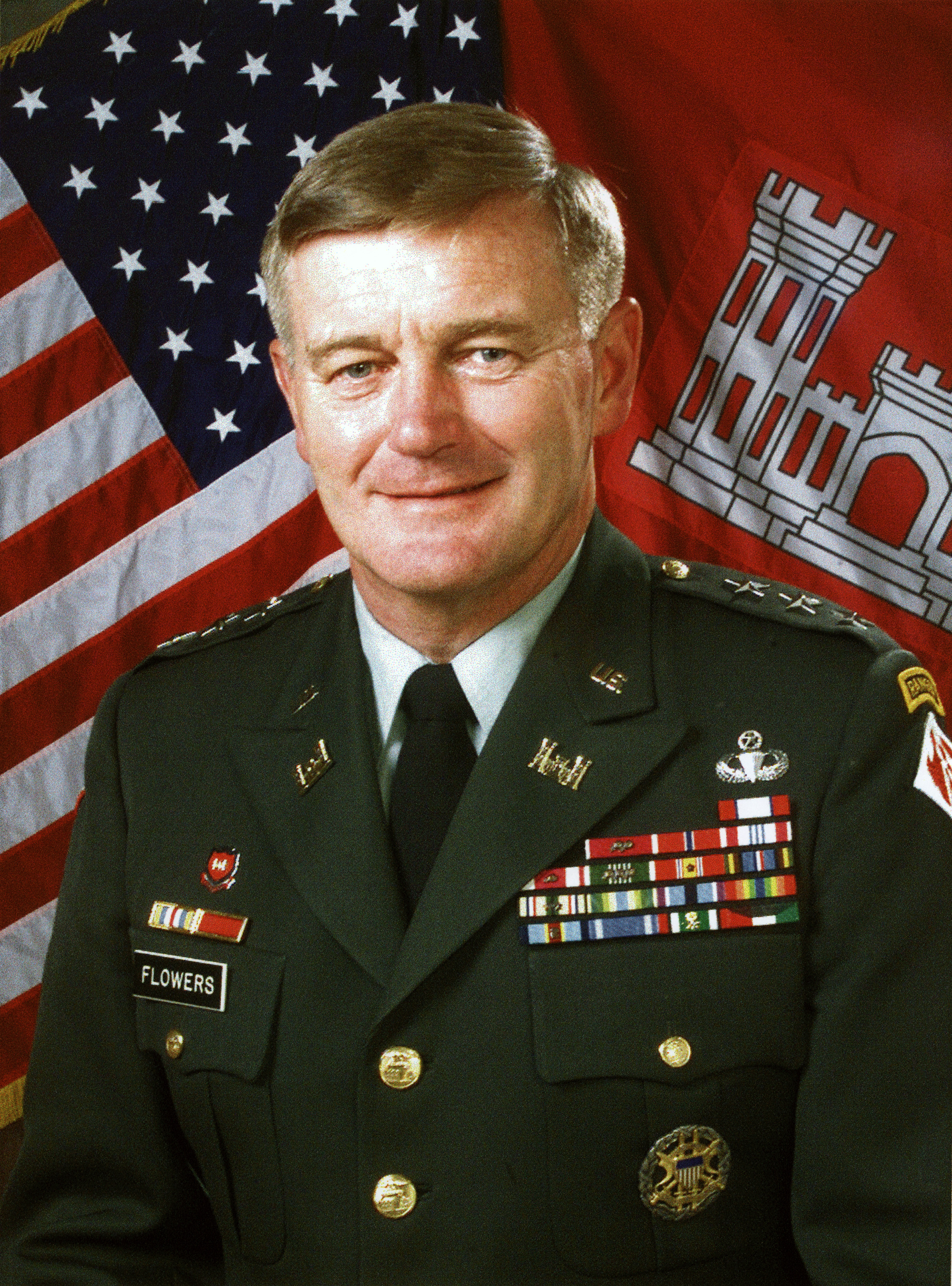
- Education: Virginia Military Institute
- Military career
- Allegiance: United States
- Branch: United States Army
- Rank: Lieutenant General
- Commands: Chief of Engineers

Lieutenant General Robert B. Flowers was born in Pennsylvania and resided in several areas of the world as his family moved during his father's military career. Following graduation and commissioning from the Virginia Military Institute in 1969, he completed Airborne and Ranger training and began his career as an Engineer Officer. He holds a master's degree in civil engineering from the University of Virginia and is a Registered Professional Engineer. Prior to his selection as Chief of Engineers and Commanding General of the U.S. Army Corps of Engineers, he served as the Commanding General of the Engineer School and Fort Leonard Wood, Missouri. On April 16, 2018, the Best Sapper Competition was named in honor of LTG Flowers for his contributions to the Sapper Leader Course and his efforts in getting the Sapper Tab approved by General Peter Schoomaker on June 28, 2004.

His other commands include an Engineer Company in Germany;

- 307th Engineer Battalion, 82nd Airborne Division;
- 20th Engineer Brigade, XVIII Airborne Corps;
- Mississippi Valley Division of the U.S. Army Corps of Engineers.

Operational deployments include

- command of an expanded brigade of 10 battalions (7,700 soldiers) during Operation Desert Shield and Operation Desert Storm;
- Task Force Engineer for the Joint Task Force in Somalia;
- Deputy Chief of Staff for Engineering (Forward), U.S. Army Europe in Bosnia.

Other assignments include

- Assistant Division Commander, 2nd Infantry Division (Mechanized), Eighth U.S. Army, South Korea
- Deputy Commanding General and Assistant Commandant, U.S. Army Engineer Center and School, Fort Leonard Wood, Missouri
- Branch Chief, Counter-narcotics Operations Division, Washington, D.C.
- Combat Developer, Combined Arms Center, Fort Leavenworth, Kansas
- Field Engineer and Research Project Manager for the Portland Engineer District;
- Staff Engineer in Thailand for the Udon Detachment and Northern Thailand.

After retiring from the Army, he joined Dawson & Associates in Washington, DC as a federal permitting advisor.

Military offices
Preceded by Joe N. Ballard	Chief of Engineers; 2000–2004	Succeeded by Carl A. Strock
