= Merdith W. B. Temple =

United States Army general (1953–2020)

Bo Temple
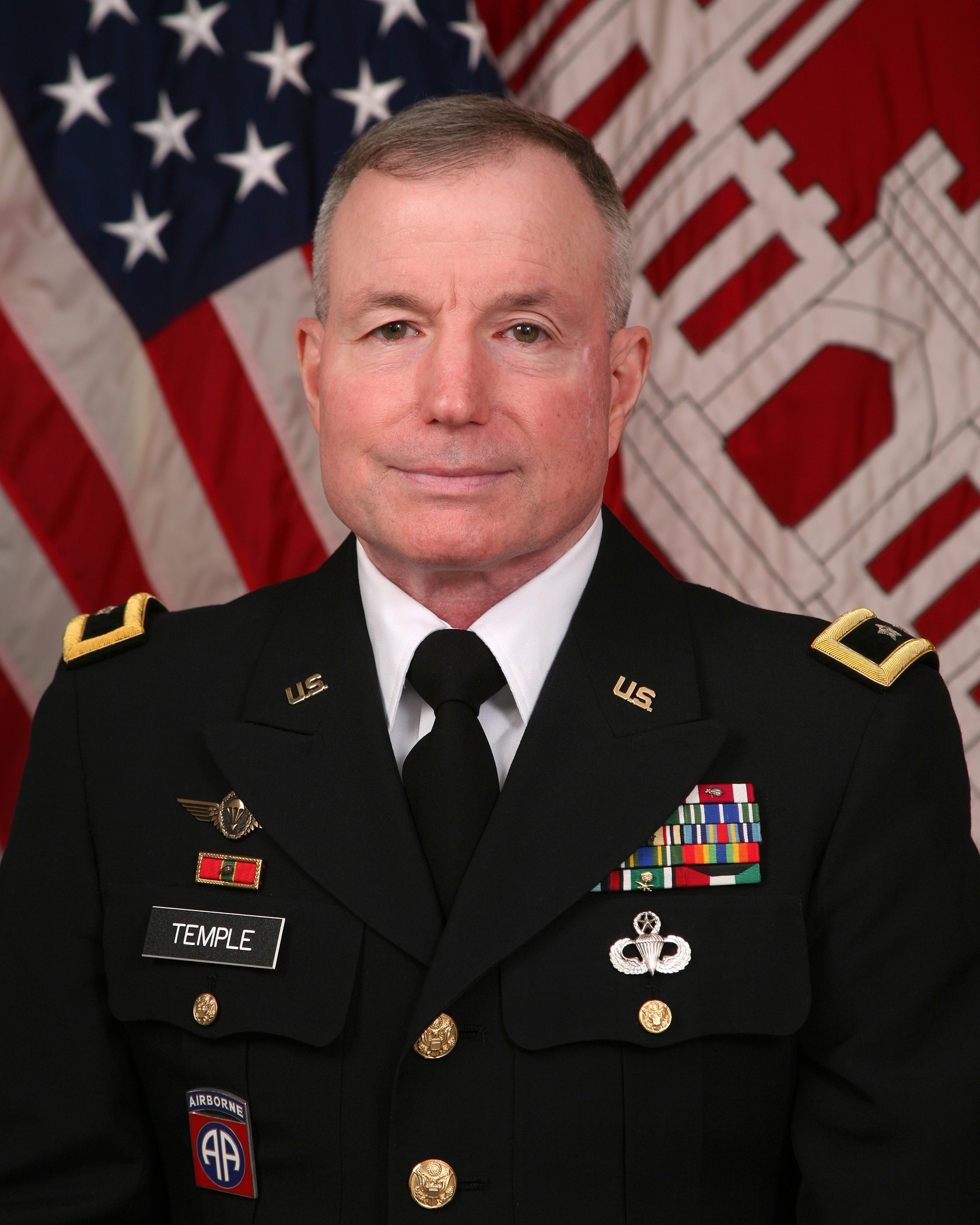
- Official portrait, 2011
- Nickname: "Bone Crusher"
- Born: Merdith Wyndham Bolling Temple; July 8, 1953; Richmond, Virginia, U.S.
- Died: November 1, 2020 (aged 67) Richmond, Virginia, U.S.
- Allegiance: United States
- Branch: United States Army
- Service years: 1975–2012
- Rank: Major General
- Commands: USACE
- Wars: Southwest Asia; War on terrorism
- Awards: Distinguished Service Medal; Legion of Merit (2); Bronze Star Medal (2); Joint Service Commendation Medal; Defense Meritorious Service Medal; Master Parachutist Badge
- Spouse: Nancy Temple (m. 1980)
- Children: 2

Major General Merdith Wyndham Bolling "Bo" Temple (July 8, 1953 – November 1, 2020) was a senior officer of the United States Army who served as the Acting Chief of Engineers and Acting Commanding General of the United States Army Corps of Engineers (USACE) from 2011 to 2012. He previously served as Deputy Chief of Engineers and Deputy Commanding General.

== Early life and career ==
Merdith Wyndham Bolling Temple was born in Richmond, Virginia, on July 8, 1953. He graduated from the Virginia Military Institute with a bachelor's degree in civil engineering and Texas A&M University with a master's degree in civil engineering. Commissioned into the United States Army in 1975, he served in operational engineering commands in Korea, the U.S., and Germany before commanding the 307th Engineer Battalion. He commanded the 20th Engineer Brigade (Combat) (Airborne) at Fort Bragg, North Carolina, from 1998 to 2000. He died of cancer on November 1, 2020, at home in Richmond, Virginia.

== Selected works ==
- "Cost Effectiveness of Geotechnical Investigations". Military Engineer. U.S. Army Corps of Engineers. January 1987.
- How George Washington Goethals Became Chief Engineer of the Panama Canal. ASCE/EWB-USA (YouTube). 2014.
- The Southeast Anatolian Project and Middle East water: implications for NATO. USAWC strategy research project. U.S. Army War College. 1998.
- U.S. Army Corps of Engineers Change Management Strategies. Society of American Military Engineers. 2015.

Military offices
Preceded by Lieutenant General Robert L. Van Antwerp Jr.	Chief of Engineers; Acting; 2011–2012	Succeeded by Lieutenant General Thomas P. Bostick
