= Harold R. Bull =

United States Army general

Harold Bull
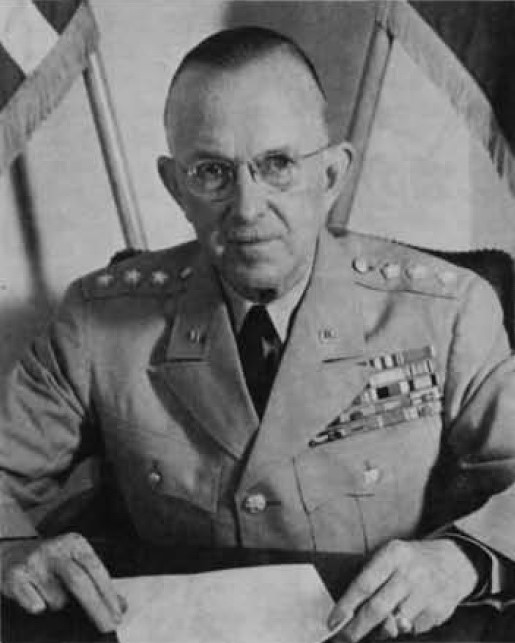
- Born: Harold Roe Bull; January 6, 1893; Springfield, Massachusetts, U.S.
- Died: November 1, 1976 (aged 83); Bethesda, Maryland, U.S.
- Military career
- Allegiance: United States
- Branch: United States Army
- Service years: 1914–1952
- Rank: Lieutenant General
- Service number: 0-3707
- Unit: Infantry Branch
- Commands: National War College; 4th Infantry Division; III Corps; 3rd Battalion, 26th Infantry; 2nd Battalion, 19th Infantry
- Conflicts: World War I World War II; Cold War
- Awards: Army Distinguished Service Medal (3); Silver Star; Legion of Merit; Bronze Star

Lieutenant General Harold Roe "Pink" Bull (January 6, 1893 – November 1, 1976) was a general in the United States Army and served as Assistant Chief of Staff (G-3) at Supreme Headquarters Allied Expeditionary Force (SHAEF) from 1943 to 1945.

== Biography ==
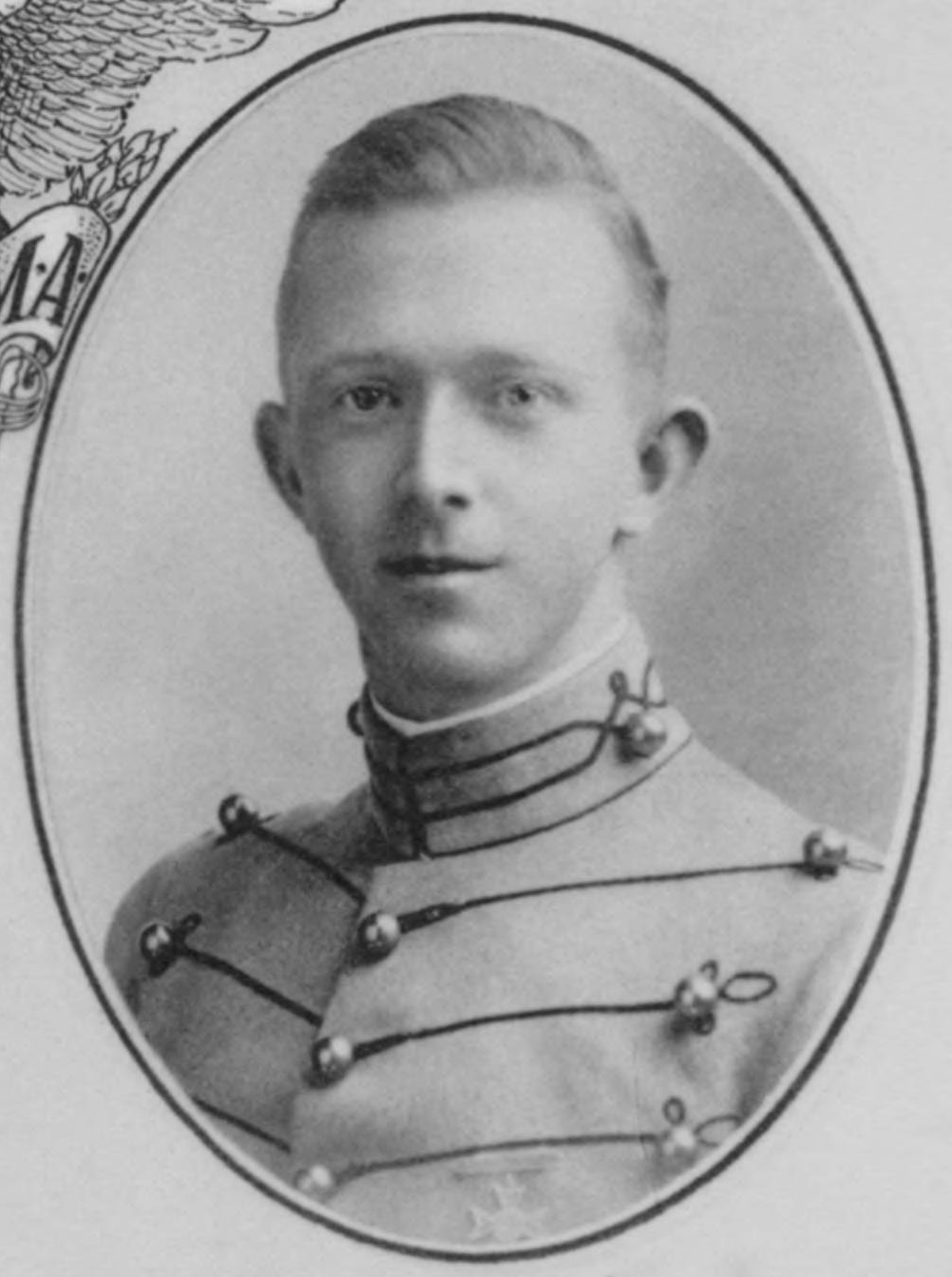
At West Point in 1914

Bull was born in Springfield, Massachusetts and graduated, 58th in a class of 107 cadets, from the United States Military Academy at West Point, New York in June 1914. Among his fellow graduates included men such as William H. Holcombe, James B. Cress, Charles P. Gross, Brehon B. Somervell, Robert W. Crawford, Dabney O. Elliott, Arthur R. Harris, LaRhett L. Stuart, John B. Anderson, Harry C. Ingles, James L. Bradley, John H. Woodberry, Harold F. Loomis, Carl Spaatz, Charles M. Milliken, Joseph W. Byron, Paul C. Paschal, Francis R. Kerr, Vicente Lim, Sylvester D. Downs Jr., Orlando Ward, Benjamin G. Weir, Ralph Royce, William O. Ryan, Frank W. Milburn, John B. Thompson and Jens A. Doe. All of them would later rise to the rank of brigadier general or higher in their later military careers.

Commissioned as an infantry officer, Bull was initially assigned to the 30th Infantry. From September 1914 to March 1918, he served with the regiment in California, New York state, Texas and North Carolina. From April to October 1918, Bull served with the 3rd Division in France. Promoted to captain in May 1917, he served as a temporary major from June 1918 to March 1920. From October 1918 to August 1920, Bull was assigned to the Washington, D.C. area. He then served as an instructor in the Department of English and History at West Point from August 1920 to August 1923.

Promoted to major in February 1923, Bull commanded the 2nd Battalion, 19th Infantry at Schofield Barracks in Hawaii from October 1923 to January 1925. He graduated from the Infantry School Advanced Course in May 1927 and the Command and General Staff School in June 1928. Bull served as an instructor at the Infantry School from August 1928 to July 1932. He graduated from the Army War College in July 1933 and the Naval War College in June 1934.

Bull served with the 26th Infantry at Plattsburg Barracks in New York state from July 1934 to July 1935 as executive officer and 3rd Battalion commander. Promoted to lieutenant colonel in September 1935, he then served at the War Department in Washington, D.C. From August 1939 to July 1941, he was professor of military science and tactics at the Culver Military Institute. Receiving temporary promotions to colonel and then brigadier general in July 1941, he served as assistant commander of the 4th Motorized Division at Fort Benning in Georgia from August to December 1941.

=== World War II ===
Temporarily promoted to major general in May 1942, Bull served as commanding general of III Corps in Georgia and Tennessee from June to October 1943.

He served as Assistant Chief of Staff (G-3) at Supreme Headquarters Allied Expeditionary Force (SHAEF) under Dwight D. Eisenhower from October 1943 until SHAEF was dissolved in July 1945. He later served as Deputy Chief of Staff and Chief of Staff of U.S. Forces in Europe (USFET) until returning to the United States Department of War in September 1946.

As head of the Operations (G-3) section of SHAEF, Bull had a major role in the planning of military operations in Europe. His office prepared most of the periodic situation reports to the Combined Chiefs of Staff and the SHAEF Operational Directives which were issued by Eisenhower's headquarters. Bull's office included the SHAEF meteorological staff which compiled weather reports for use in planning military operations. A favorable weather report by Bull's staff helped General Eisenhower decide to launch the invasion of Normandy on the morning of June 6, 1944. From September 20 to September 29, 1944, Bull was commanding general of the 4th Infantry Division.

His promotion to colonel was made permanent in October 1942, brigadier general in June 1946 and major general in January 1948.

== Post-war ==
Bull was promoted to lieutenant general in July 1949 and served as Commandant of the National War College until his retirement from the Army in July 1952. He then spent five years at the Central Intelligence Agency.

Bull died at his home in the Westmoreland Hills neighborhood of Bethesda, Maryland on November 1, 1976, and was buried at Arlington National Cemetery.

== Decorations ==
Army Distinguished Service Medal with two Oak Leaf Clusters
Silver Star
Legion of Merit
Bronze Star Medal
Mexican Border Service Medal
World War I Victory Medal with 3 Battle Clasps
American Defense Service Medal
American Campaign Medal
European-African-Middle Eastern Campaign Medal with seven service stars
World War II Victory Medal
Army of Occupation Medal
National Defense Service Medal
Officer of the Legion of Honor
French Croix de guerre 1939–1945 with Palm

Military offices
Preceded by John P. Lucas	Commanding General III Corps; June–October 1943	Succeeded by John Millikin
Preceded by Raymond O. Barton	Commanding General 4th Infantry Division; September 1944	Succeeded by Raymond O. Barton
