= John B. Anderson (United States Army officer) =

American general (1891–1976)

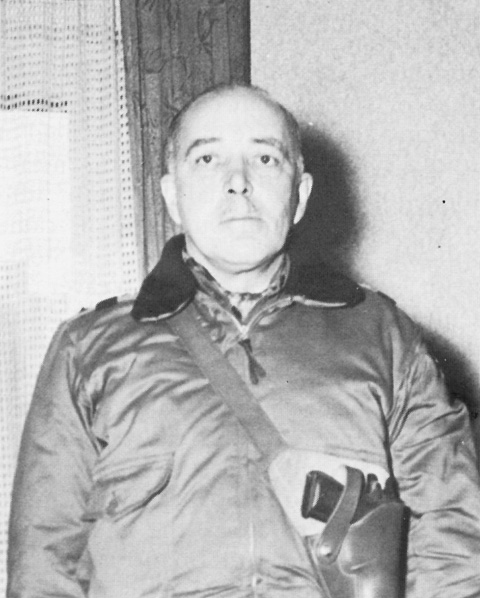
- Born: March 10, 1891; Parkersburg, Iowa, United States
- Died: September 1, 1976 (aged 85); Washington, D.C., United States
- Military career
- Allegiance: United States
- Branch: United States Army
- Service years: 1914–1946
- Rank: Major General
- Nickname: "Andy"
- Service number: 0-3686
- Unit: Field Artillery Branch
- Commands: 1st Battalion, 6th Field Artillery Regiment; 2nd Battalion, 24th Field Artillery Regiment; 102nd Infantry Division; XVI Corps
- Conflicts: Pancho Villa Expedition; World War I World War II
- Awards: Army Distinguished Service Medal; Legion of Merit; Bronze Star

Signature
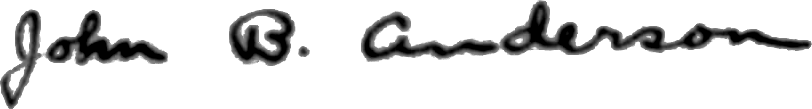

Major General John Benjamin Anderson (March 10, 1891 – September 1, 1976) was a senior United States Army officer who fought in both World War I and World War II. During the latter he served as the first wartime commander of the 102nd Infantry Division and later commanded XVI Corps during the final stages of the war in Europe.

== Early life and military career ==
John Benjamin Anderson was born on March 10, 1891, in Parkersburg, Iowa, to Danish immigrants Carl Christian Anderson and Louisa (Simonsen) Anderson. Known to his family and friends from Parkersburg as "Ben", he was the youngest of seven children. Being the son of an immigrant laborer and farmer, young Anderson's early life was not especially easy, consisting mainly of hard labor on the farm, coupled with school, chores, church, and time spent with family. Despite this, he was lucky enough to escape the worst of many childhood diseases, such as diphtheria, polio and tuberculosis, which were always round the corner.

After graduating from Parkersburg High School in 1910, Anderson, determined to pursue a military career, left Parkersburg for the United States Military Academy (USMA) at West Point, New York. A newspaper article at the time, upon hearing about Anderson's appointment, described him as an "exceptionally bright young man and a good student", further stating that "these qualifications count for much with the military authorities in charge of the school.". He was one of just 130 cadet appointments to the academy in 1910.

After just over four years, he graduated thirty-third in a class of 107 on June 12, 1914, shortly before World War I broke out in Europe. John J. Pershing, then a brigadier general, was among the guests at the graduation. Anderson was commissioned as a second lieutenant into the Field Artillery Branch of the United States Army on that date. Fellow graduates included men such as William H. Holcombe, James B. Cress, Charles P. Gross, Brehon B. Somervell, Robert W. Crawford, Dabney O. Elliott, Arthur R. Harris, LaRhett L. Stuart, Harry C. Ingles, James L. Bradley, John H. Woodberry, Harold F. Loomis, Carl Spaatz, Harold R. Bull, Charles M. Milliken, Joseph W. Byron, Paul C. Paschal, Francis R. Kerr, Vicente Lim, Sylvester D. Downs Jr., Orlando Ward, Benjamin G. Weir, Ralph Royce, William O. Ryan, Frank W. Milburn, John B. Thompson and Jens A. Doe. All of them would later rise to the rank of brigadier general or higher in their later military careers.

Anderson was subsequently assigned to the 6th Field Artillery Regiment and transferred to El Paso, Texas, with his unit, where he served on the Mexican border during the Pancho Villa Expedition in 1916. John was there upon the American entry into World War I, which occurred on April 6, 1917, with the United States declaring war on Germany.

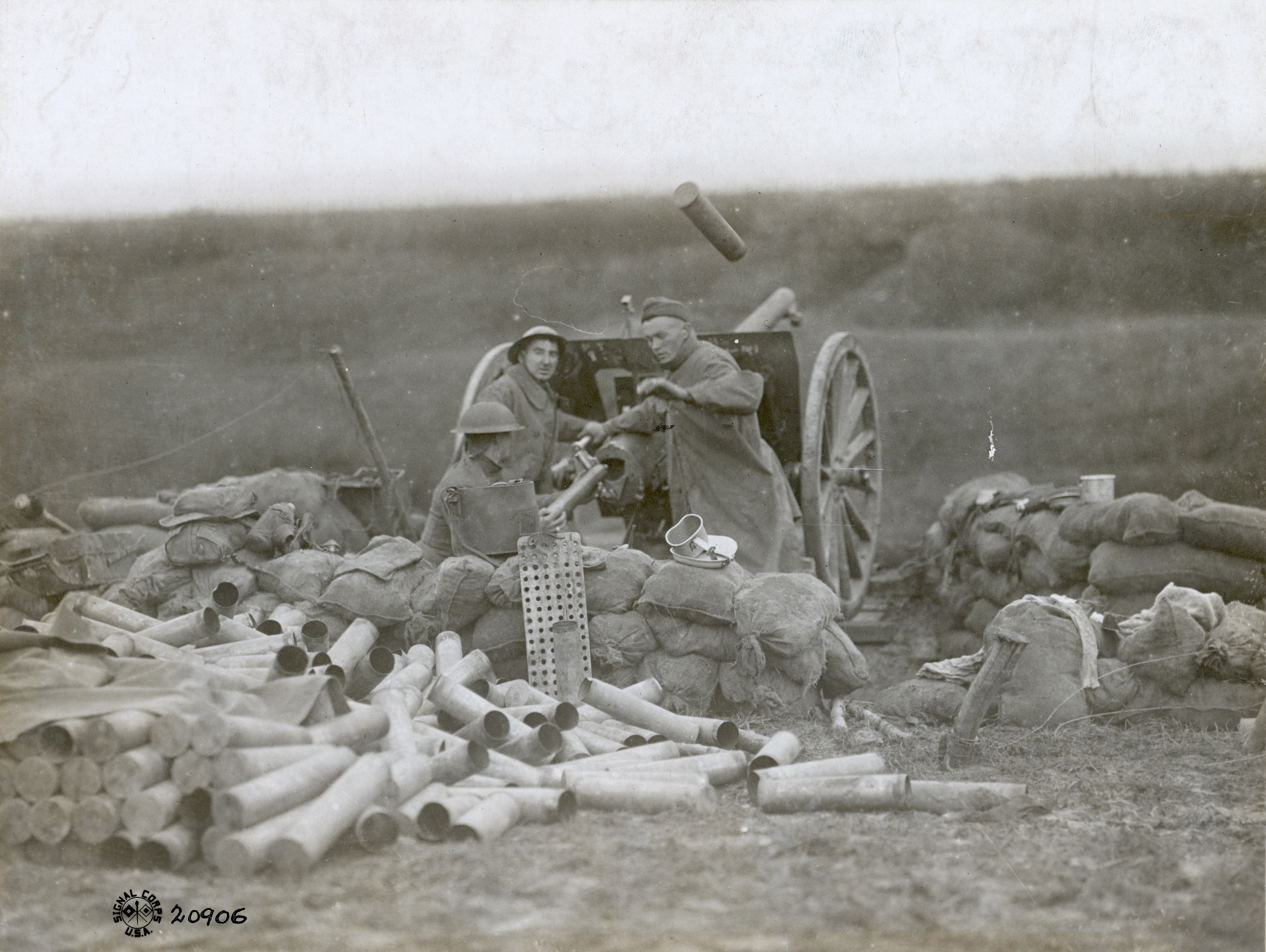
Battery C, 6th Field Artillery, the regiment with which Anderson was serving as a young officer, fired the first shot for America on the Lorraine front. A shell case flying through the air and a new shell sliding into the breech in the same fraction of a second. Beaumont, France, February 1918.

During the war, Anderson was sent, with the 6th Field Artillery Regiment, part of the newly created 1st Division, to the Western Front, where he served as a regimental adjutant in the Somme sector, scene of much bitter fighting the year before, in France in October and November 1917. He witnessed the first American artillery shot into German lines, a 75mm round from his old unit, Battery C of the 6th Field Artillery. Major General William L. Sibert, the division's commander, ordered that the shell cases of the first eight of the total twenty-four shots fired were to be sent to him. President Woodrow Wilson was immediately sent the first shell casing, which he kept as a souvenir. Soon afterwards, Anderson left his unit to attend the Command and General Staff School established by General Pershing’s command at Langres, France, in January, 1918.

In the spring of 1918, Anderson served with the British Expeditionary Force (BEF) in Belgium at the Ypres Salient, which, he described in his diary on February 19, 1918, "the hottest place along the whole front." He was appointed adjutant of the 1st Field Artillery Brigade. Later, Anderson was transferred back to his 6th Artillery Regiment, where he served as battery commander and briefly commanded a battalion of the 6th Field Artillery Regiment prior to the Battle of Cantigny.

Before the attack, however, and over his objections, and those of both Major General Robert Lee Bullard, the new division commander (who had replaced Sibert many months before), and Brigadier General Charles P. Summerall, commanding the division's 1st Field Artillery Brigade, Anderson was ordered to return to the United States, specifically Washington, D.C., and to report to the Historical Section of the U.S. Army War College. Upon his completion of this, and after a brief leave to his home town of Parkersburg, he was sent to the Firing Center (now the U.S. Army Field Artillery School) at Fort Sill in Oklahoma. The army was still undergoing its huge expansion and officers with Anderson's experience were rare and, therefore, urgently needed. He served in this capacity for the remainder of the war, which came to an end with the signing of the Armistice with Germany on November 11, 1918. This was after he had been promoted, first to major on July 17, 1918, and then again to lieutenant colonel just two months later.

== Between the wars ==
After brief occupation duties, Anderson returned to the United States in 1919 and was posted to the Fort Sill, Oklahoma, where John was appointed instructor at the local U.S. Army Field Artillery School. John also attended the Advanced Course at this institution during the years 1922 and 1923.

John Benjamin Anderson attended the U.S. Army Command and General Staff School at Fort Leavenworth, Kansas, in June 1925 and subsequently served as a battalion commander of the 24th Field Artillery Regiment at Fort Stotsenburg, Philippines until July 1927.

From September 1927 to June 1928 Anderson studied at the U.S. Army War College in Washington, D.C. Among his fellow students there included Dwight D. Eisenhower, Joseph Stilwell and William Hood Simpson. Anderson was then assigned to the personal division of the War Department General Staff. In this capacity, John was sent to the Geneva, Switzerland in 1929 as one of the U.S. Army representatives to the conference regarding the treatment of prisoners of war.

John was transferred to the 13th Field Artillery Regiment stationed at Fort Bragg, North Carolina, and served there until September 1934. John was subsequently appointed the instructor at the U.S. Army Command and General Staff School at Fort Leavenworth, Kansas and was promoted to the rank of lieutenant colonel in this capacity.

In July 1938, towards the end of the interwar period, John Benjamin Anderson was transferred to the staff of the Office of the Chief of Artillery in Washington, D.C., where Jon was appointed Chief of Personnel Section. In this capacity, John Benjamin Anderson was promoted to the one-star general officer rank of brigadier general at the end of October 1941, shortly before the United States entered World War II.

== World War II ==
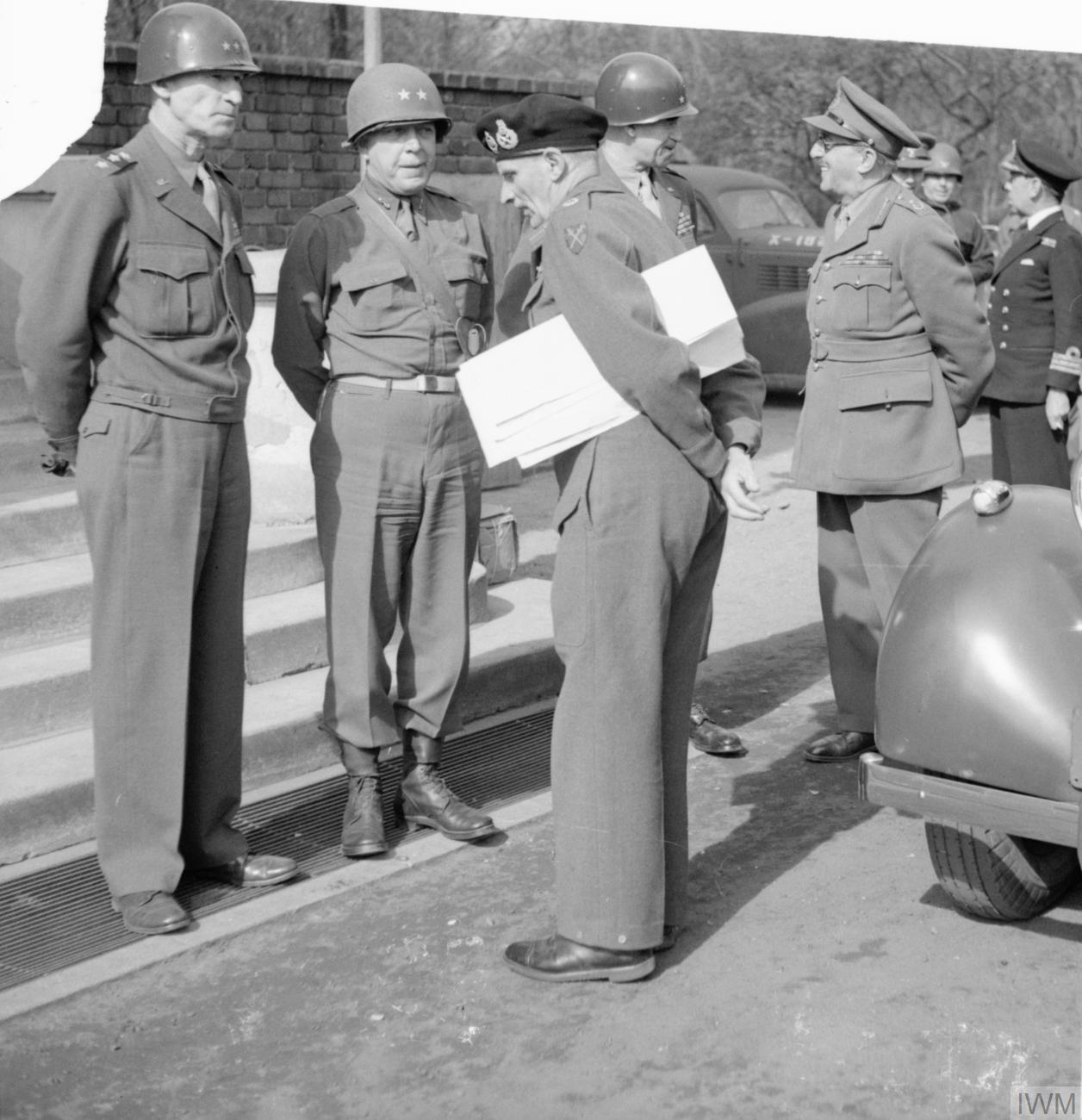
British Field Marshal Sir Bernard Montgomery talking with Lieutenant General William Simpson and Major General John B. Anderson. Behind are General Omar Bradley and British Field Marshal Sir Alan Brooke, March 25, 1945.

A month later, John was appointed Chief Artillery officer of the 2nd Infantry Division (Indianhead), which was stationed at Fort Sam Houston, Texas. The division was then under the command of Major General John C. H. Lee. At that time, the 2nd Division was organized as a square division of four infantry regiments but was soon reorganized as a triangular division of three regiments.

On August 4, 1942, eighth months after the American entry into World War II, John Benjamin Anderson was promoted to the two-star general officer rank of major general.

On September 15, the 102nd Infantry Division was activated at Camp Maxey, Texas, and recently promoted Major General John Benjamin Anderson was appointed as the division's first commanding general (CG). John Benjamin Anderson participated in the training with his division and served with it until December 1943, before handing over command of the 102nd to Major General Frank Keating.

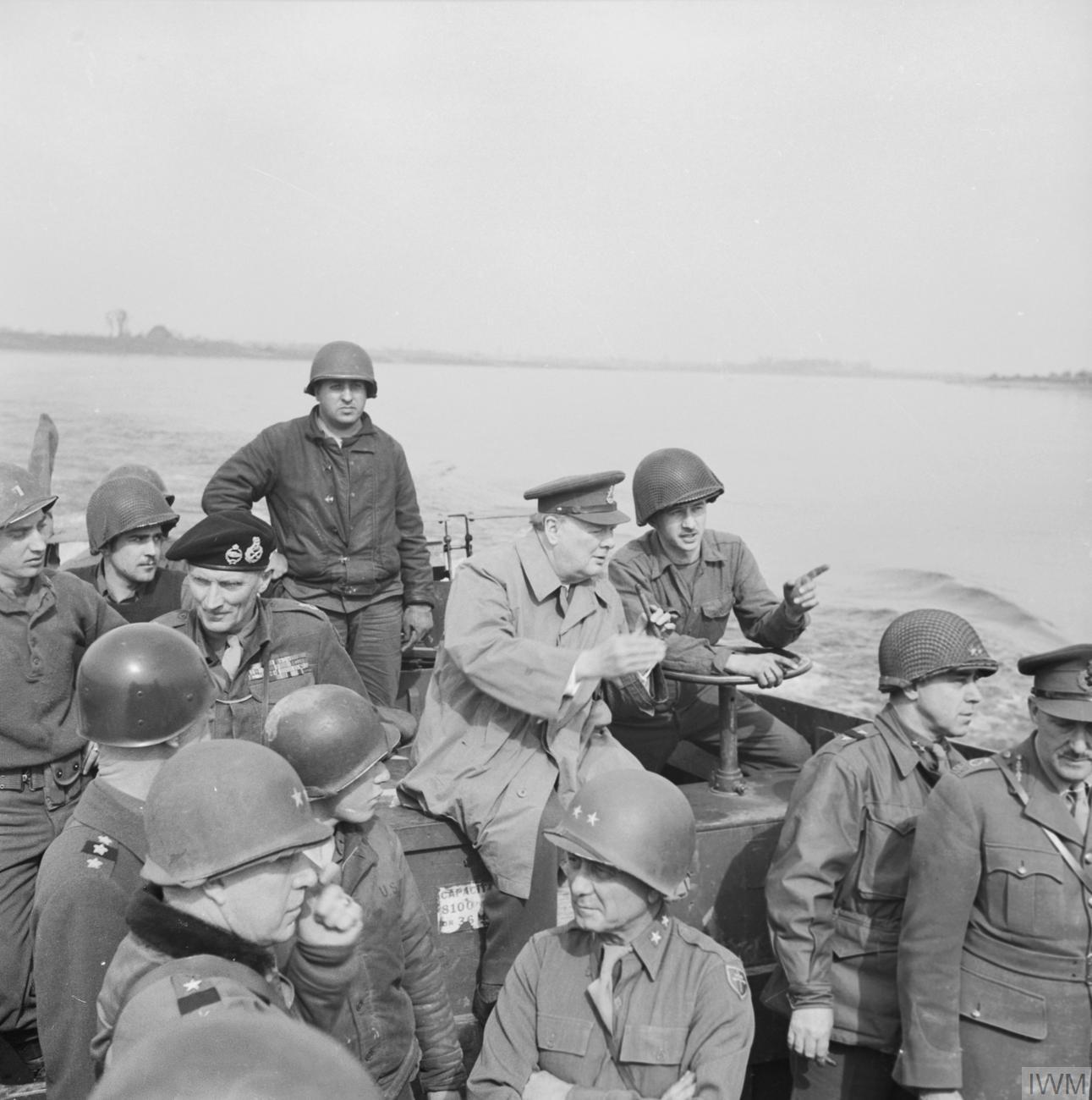
The British Prime Minister, Winston Churchill (center), crosses the River Rhine to the east bank, south of Wesel, in an American Landing Craft Vehicle Personnel (or Higgins boat) with Field Marshal Sir Bernard Montgomery (left of Churchill), who is talking to U.S. Lieutenant General William H. Simpson, Field Marshal Sir Alan Brooke (furthest right) who is standing in front of U.S. Major General Leland Hobbs. To Simpson's right is Major General John B. Anderson, who is talking to Major General Ira T. Wyche. Picture taken on March 25, 1945.

In December 1943, the XVI Corps was activated at Fort Riley, Kansas, and John Benjamin Anderson assumed command in early January 1944. XVI Corps participated in the winter training exercises at Watersmeet Township, Michigan, and subsequently it was later deployed in the European Theater of Operations (ETO).

John Benjamin Anderson commanded the XVI Corps on the Western Front as part of the U.S. Ninth Army in the Rhineland Campaign and also in the Central Europe Campaign. XVI Corps under John Benjamin Anderson's command liberated the Dutch city of Roermond and participated in the combats in the Ruhr Pocket.

John Benjamin Anderson was decorated for his leadership with the Army Distinguished Service Medal, Legion of Merit and Bronze Star by the United States government. John Benjamin Anderson also received some foreign decorations (see below).

== Postwar ==
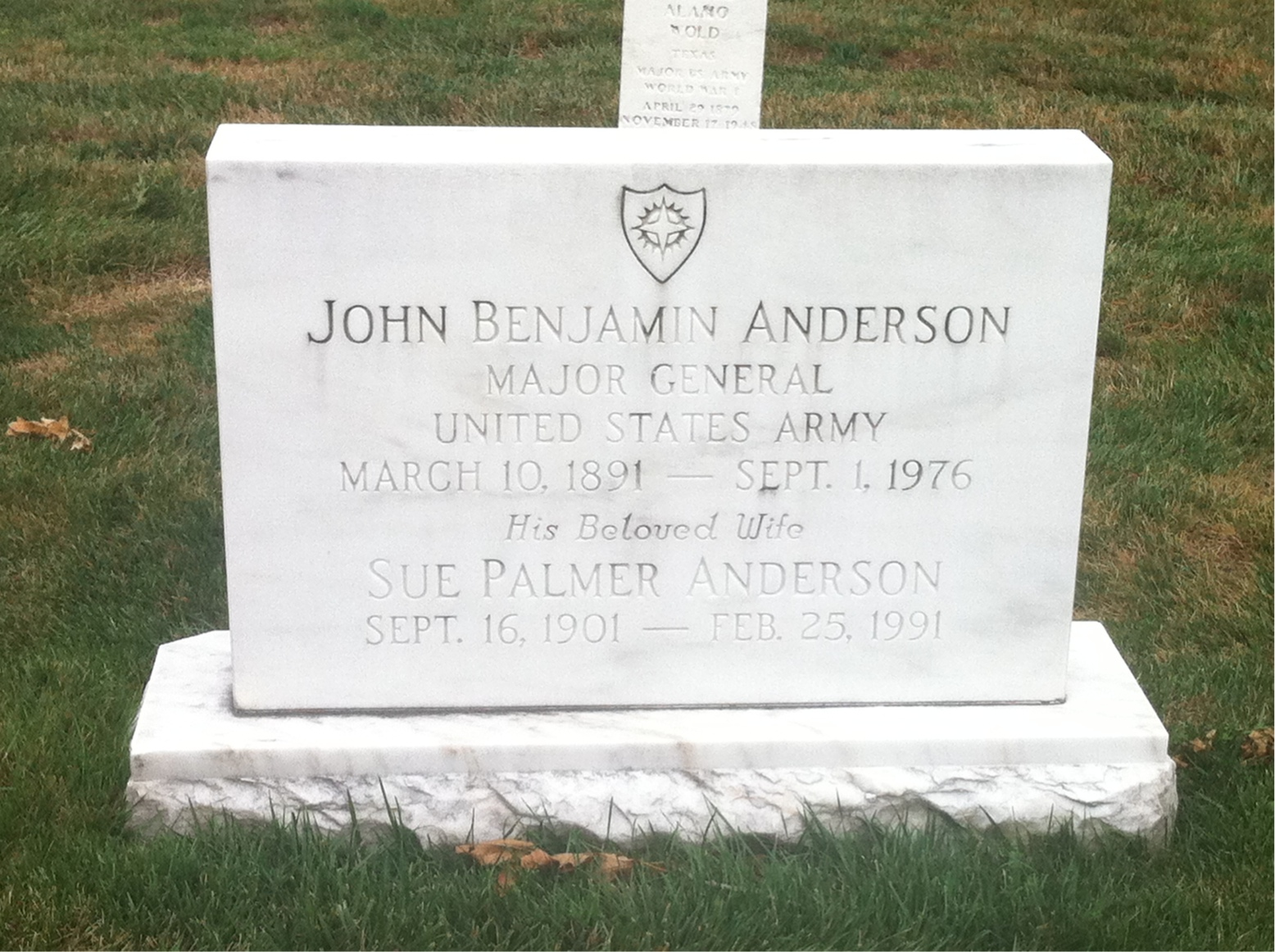
The grave of Major General John B. Anderson at Arlington National Cemetery

On June 6, 1945, the city of Roermond, Netherlands held a victory celebration during which they honored General John Benjamin Anderson and members of the XVI corps for liberating the city. As part of the celebration, the city renamed one of its major roads "Andersonweg" (Anderson Street). A plaque was placed on a prominent building to commemorate the event.

John Benjamin Anderson was succeeded in the command of XVI Corps by Major General Thomas D. Finley in October 1945 and John subsequently returned to the United States. John retired from the army the following year, on June 30, 1946, after a 33-year military career, due to a disability.

John Benjamin Anderson died on September 1, 1976, at the age of 85 in Washington, D.C., and is buried, together with his wife, Sue Palmer Anderson (1901–1991), at Arlington National Cemetery, Virginia.

== Decorations ==
Anderson's ribbon bar:

1st Row	Army Distinguished Service Medal	Legion of Merit	Bronze Star Medal	
2nd Row	Mexican Service Medal	World War I Victory Medal with two battle clasps	Army of Occupation of Germany Medal	American Defense Service Medal
3rd Row	American Campaign Medal	European–African–Middle Eastern Campaign Medal with four service stars	World War II Victory Medal	Army of Occupation Medal
4th Row	Officer of the Legion of Honor (France)	French Croix de guerre 1939–1945 with Palm	Grand officer of the Dutch Order of Orange-Nassau	Belgian Croix de guerre 1940–1945 with Palm

== Bibliography ==
- Taaffe, Stephen R. (2013). Marshall and His Generals: U.S. Army Commanders in World War II. Lawrence, Kansas: University Press of Kansas. ISBN 978-0-7006-1942-9. OCLC 840162019.
- Van Ness, Michael (2019). General in Command: The Life of Major General John B. Anderson. Koehler Books, 2019. ISBN 9781633938519.

Military offices
Preceded by Newly activated post	Commanding General 102nd Infantry Division; 1942–1944	Succeeded by Frank A. Keating
Preceded by Newly activated post	Commanding General XVI Corps; 1944–1945	Succeeded by Thomas D. Finley
