= Arthur Harris (polo) =

American polo player

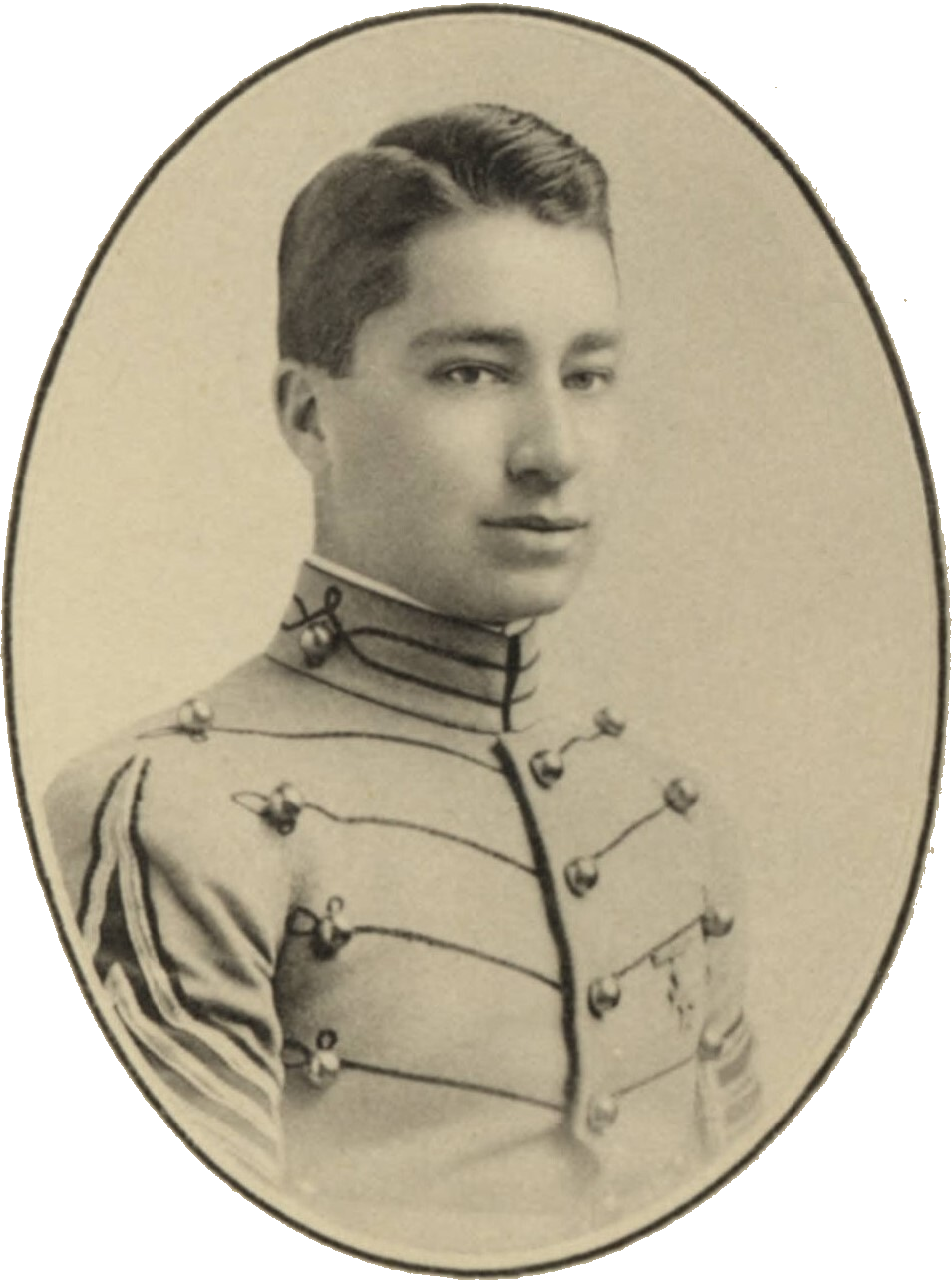
- At West Point in 1914

Personal information
- Born: August 1, 1890 Norfolk, Nebraska, United States
- Died: March 20, 1968 (aged 77) Stuart, Florida, United States

Sport
- Sport: Polo

Arthur Ringland Harris (August 1, 1890 – March 20, 1968) was an American ice hockey and polo player. While serving as a United States Army officer, he competed in the polo tournament at the 1920 Summer Olympics winning a bronze medal.

Born in Nebraska and raised in Nevada, Harris was a 1914 graduate of the United States Military Academy, graduating 19th in a class of 107. While a student, he played center for the ice hockey team. Among his fellow graduates included men such as William H. Holcombe, James B. Cress, Charles P. Gross, Brehon B. Somervell, Robert W. Crawford, Dabney O. Elliott, LaRhett L. Stuart, John B. Anderson, Harry C. Ingles, James L. Bradley, John H. Woodberry, Harold F. Loomis, Carl Spaatz, Harold R. Bull, Charles M. Milliken, Joseph W. Byron, Paul C. Paschal, Francis R. Kerr, Vicente Lim, Sylvester D. Downs Jr., Orlando Ward, Benjamin G. Weir, Ralph Royce, William O. Ryan, Frank W. Milburn, John B. Thompson and Jens A. Doe. All of them would later rise to the rank of brigadier general or higher in their later military careers. He was commissioned as a field artillery officer and served with the American Expeditionary Forces in Europe during World War I.

After the war and participation in the 1920 Olympics, Harris graduated from the Command and General Staff School in 1926. He was given command of the 2nd Battalion, 3rd Field Artillery from September 1, 1930, to August 31, 1931.

From 1931 to 1935, Harris served as military attaché in Costa Rica. He was promoted to lieutenant colonel effective August 1, 1935. From June 1939 to October 1940, he headed the Latin American Section of the Military Intelligence Division on the War Department General Staff. From May 1941 to November 1941, Harris commanded the 47th Field Artillery Regiment. He received a temporary promotion to colonel on June 26, 1941, which was made permanent effective July 1, 1942.

From April 1942 to July 1945, Harris served as military attaché in Mexico. He received a temporary promotion to brigadier general on March 14, 1943. After World War II, Harris served as military attaché in Argentina until March 1946. He was awarded the Legion of Merit for his service and returned to his permanent rank of colonel on June 30, 1946. Harris retired from active duty on April 30, 1948, and was advanced to brigadier general on the retired list on August 16, 1948.

Harris and his wife Helen Burr (Curtice) Harris (1896–1977) settled in Hobe Sound, Florida after his retirement. They are buried at Arlington National Cemetery.
