= James L. Bradley =

United States Army general (1891–1957)

James Lester Bradley
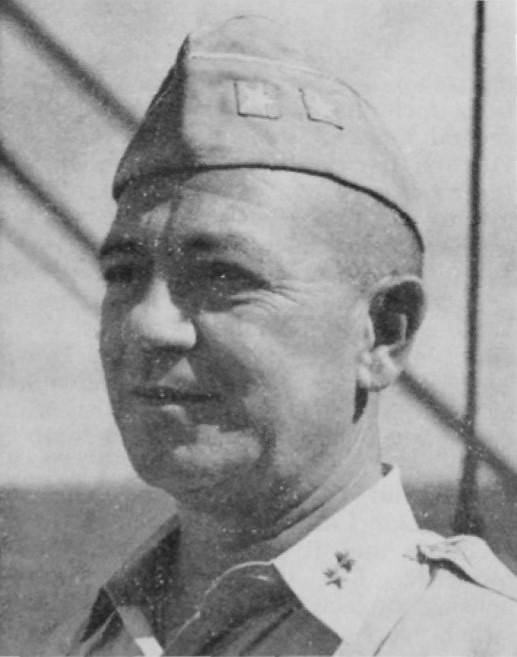
- Born: May 18, 1891; Doniphan, Missouri, United States
- Died: July 30, 1957 (aged 66); Lafayette, California, United States
- Burial place: San Francisco National Cemetery, California, United States
- Military career
- Allegiance: United States
- Branch: United States Army
- Service years: 1914–1947
- Rank: Major General
- Service number: 0-3690
- Unit: Infantry Branch
- Commands: 16th Infantry Regiment; 96th Infantry Division
- Conflicts: World War II
- Awards: Army Distinguished Service Medal; Legion of Merit; Bronze Star Medal

Signature
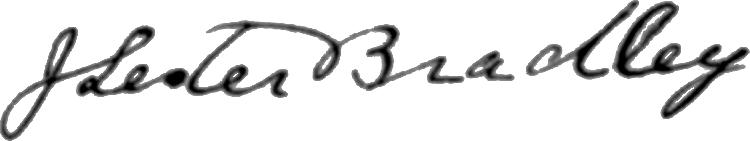

Major General James Lester Bradley (May 18, 1891 − July 30, 1957) was a United States Army officer who commanded the 96th Infantry Division throughout its existence in World War II.

== Early life and military career ==
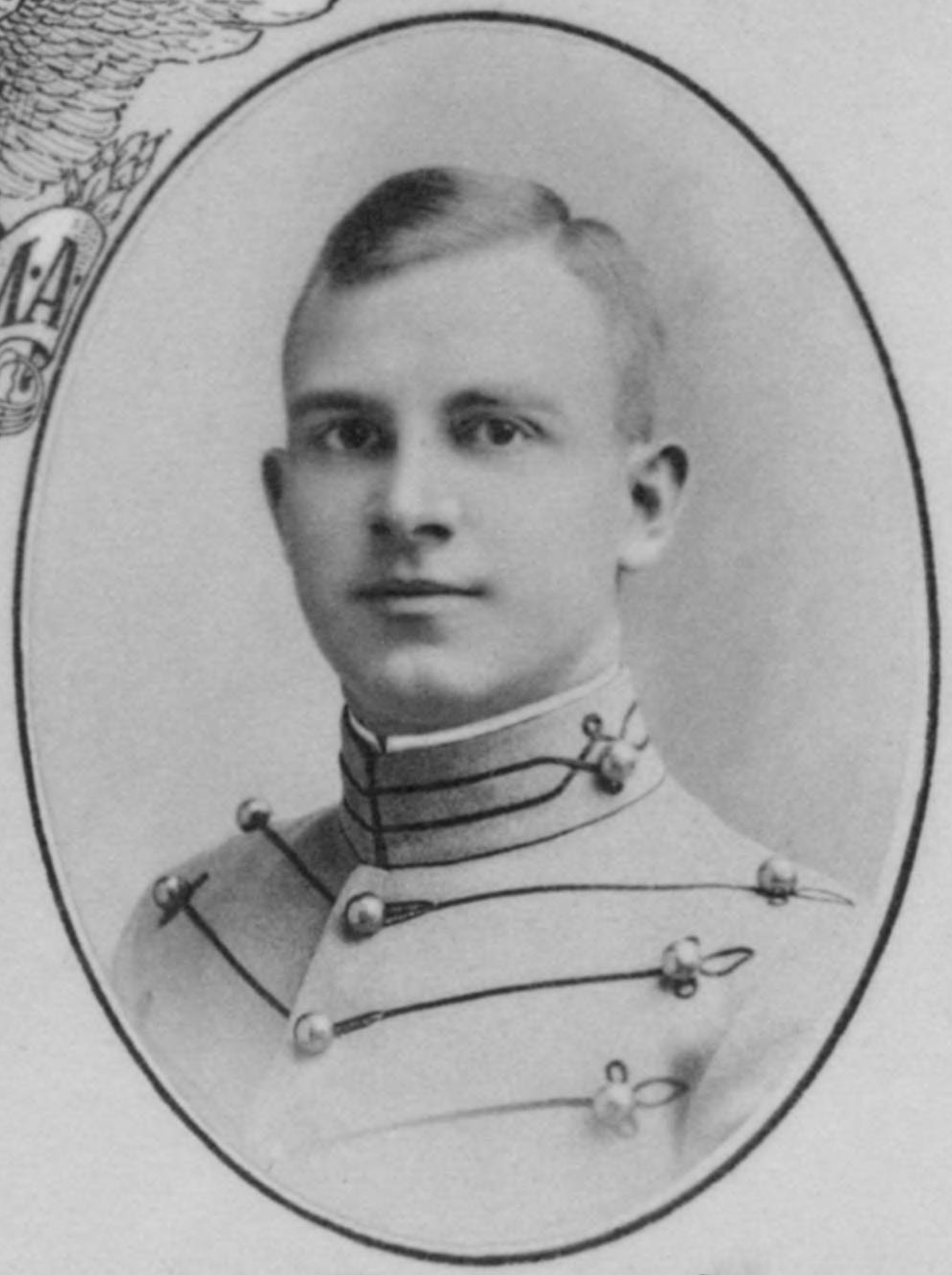
At West Point in 1914

James Lester Brown was born on May 18, 1891, in Doniphan, Missouri. He was the son of Spencer Price and Mary Watts Bradley. Desiring a military career, he entered the United States Military Academy (USMA) in 1910 and graduated from there four years later, in 1914, the same year that World War I began in Europe. After graduating, 37 in a class of 107, he was assigned to the United States Army's Infantry Branch as a second lieutenant. Among his fellow graduates included men such as William H. Holcombe, James B. Cress, Charles P. Gross, Brehon B. Somervell, Robert W. Crawford, Dabney O. Elliott, Arthur R. Harris, LaRhett L. Stuart, John B. Anderson, Harry C. Ingles, John H. Woodberry, Harold F. Loomis, Carl Spaatz, Harold R. Bull, Charles M. Milliken, Joseph W. Byron, Paul C. Paschal, Francis R. Kerr, Vicente Lim, Sylvester D. Downs Jr., Orlando Ward, Benjamin G. Weir, Ralph Royce, William O. Ryan, Frank W. Milburn, John B. Thompson and Jens A. Doe. All of them would later rise to the rank of brigadier general or higher in their later military careers

While he was at the USMA he became friends with Dwight D. Eisenhower, who would graduate the following year and ultimately become President of the United States.

Bradley's first assignment was with the 19th Infantry Regiment. He was promoted to first lieutenant on July 1, 1916, followed by another promotion to captain on May 15, 1917. By this time, the United States had entered World War I. He was promoted yet again, to major in the National Army, on June 17, 1918. He, like many other U.S. Army officers of his generation, did not see service in World War I.

== Between the wars ==
He remained in the army during the interwar period, attending the U.S. Army Command and General Staff School in 1925, and the U.S. Army War College in 1930. He returned to the Command and General Staff School two years later, now as an instructor. He remained in this post until August 1936, when he was made executive officer of the 16th Infantry Regiment, and then briefly commanding officer (CO) of the regiment. He then served in a variety of staff appointments, culminating in 1940 as chief of staff of the Fourth Army in 1940. By now, World War II in Europe had already begun but the United States was still neutral.

== World War II ==
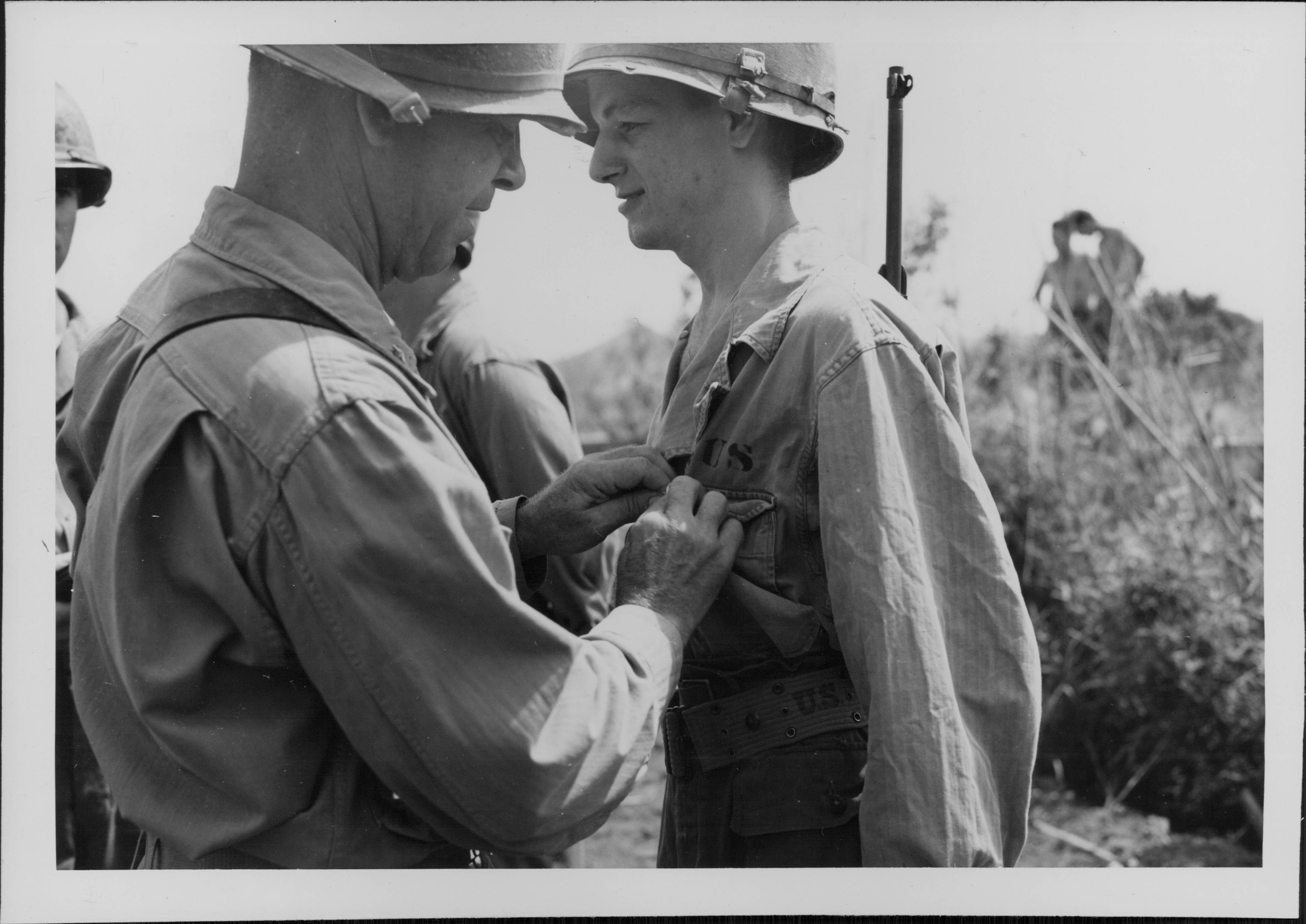
Bradley presents the Purple Heart to a soldier in Okinawa

Bradley remained in this post until May 1942, five months after the American entry into World War II due to the Japanese attack on Pearl Harbor and the German declaration of war. Bradley was by now a brigadier general, having been promoted to that rank in September 1941. In June, he was promoted to major general and was made Commanding General (CG) of the 96th Infantry Division upon its activation on August 15, 1942. For most of the war his assistant division commander (ADC) was Brigadier General Claudius Miller Easley.

After over two years spent training in the United States, including two months spent training in the Hawaiian Islands from July−September 1944, Bradley and his 96th Division were sent to the Pacific theater of war to fight against the Empire of Japan.

The division saw action for the first time during the battle of Leyte in October 1944. The division continued fighting in mainly small-unit actions until, by Christmas Day 1944, all organized resistance by the Japanese had ceased. From then onwards, Bradley's 96th Division was, for the next three months, engaged mainly in security duties, clearing up the rest of the island of Japanese resistance, and training for future operations, most notably the upcoming invasion of Okinawa.

The battle of Okinawa, codenamed Operation Iceberg, was to be the largest amphibious assault of the entire Pacific War and the battle itself was to last almost three months, from early April until mid-June 1945.

The initial invasion of Okinawa was the largest amphibious assault of the Pacific War and the subsequent battle saw one of the highest casualty rates of any campaign fought during World War II, with the Japanese losing well over 100,000 men, and the Allies suffering 50,000 casualties, roughly half the number of the Japanese. In addition, over 100,000 civilians became casualties, with some 12,000 of them being killed.

For the battle, Bradley's 96th Division would come under the command of Major General John R. Hodges' XXIV Corps, itself part of Lieutenant General Simon B. Buckner's U.S. Tenth Army. Four other divisions of the Tenth Army, the 7th, 27th, 77th and 81st, as well as the 1st and 6th Marine Divisions, fought on the island, with the 2nd Marine Division left in reserve and was never used. Supporting the invasion were naval, amphibious, and the Tenth Army's Tactical Air Force.

The operation's primary objective was to secure the island, which was only 340 miles away from the mainland of Japan which, after a very long campaign of leapfrogging (or island hopping), the Allies were now approaching. Okinawa was to be used as a base for an air offensive over Japan and intended to support Operation Downfall, the Allied invasion of mainland Japan. However, the atomic bombings of Hiroshima and Nagasaki brought an end to the war.

As a result of the hard fighting during the fighting on Okinawa, Bradley's 96th Division was given a unique honor in the shape of the Presidential Unit Citation. The division was one of just four to be awarded with this citation during the war.

== After the war ==
Bradley, after well over three decades of continuous military service, retired from the army in 1947, and was granted the permanent rank of major general.

On July 30, 1957, Bradley, who had then been undergoing treatment for a heart ailment, was found dead after drowning in a swimming pool in his daughter Mildred's home in Lafayette, California.

He was buried at San Francisco National Cemetery on August 2, 1957.

== Personal life ==
On December 6, 1916, Bradley married Pauline Clarkson, from San Antonio, Texas, in Del Rio, Texas and together went on to have only a single child, a daughter, Mildred C. Bradley Walter. On September 28, 1949, Bradley's wife Pauline died in San Mateo, California.

Military offices
Preceded by Newly activated organization	Commanding General 96th Infantry Division; 1942–1946	Succeeded by Post deactivated
