= Harry C. Ingles =

American general (1888–1976)

Harry Clyde Ingles
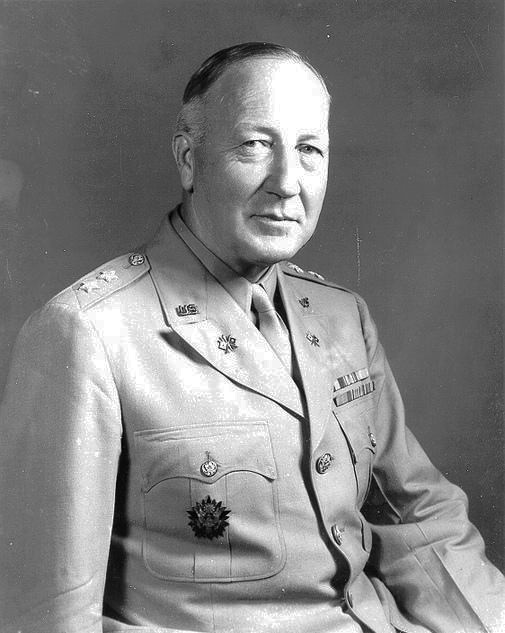
- Born: March 12, 1888; Pleasant Hill, Nebraska, US
- Died: August 15, 1976 (aged 88); Bethesda, Maryland, US
- Military career
- Allegiance: United States
- Branch: United States Army
- Service years: 1914–1947
- Rank: Major General
- Service number: 0-3689
- Unit: U.S. Army Signal Corps
- Commands: Panama Canal Division
- Conflicts: World War I World War II
- Awards: Army Distinguished Service Medal (2)

Signature
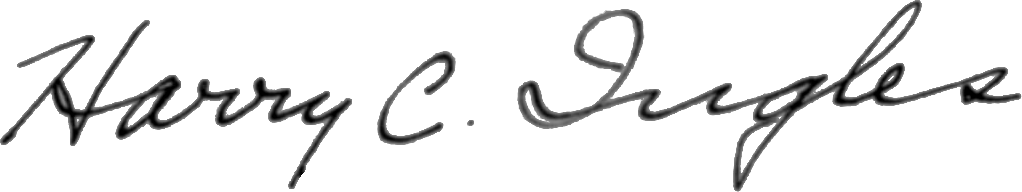

Harry Clyde Ingles (March 12, 1888 – August 15, 1976) was a United States Army major general, who served during World War II and commanded the United States Army Signal Corps.

== Early years ==
Harry C. Ingles was born on March 12, 1888, in Pleasant Hill, Nebraska, as the son of John William and Martha Ingles. After attending the high school at Lincoln, Ingles enrolled at the University of Nebraska, where he studied electrical engineering.

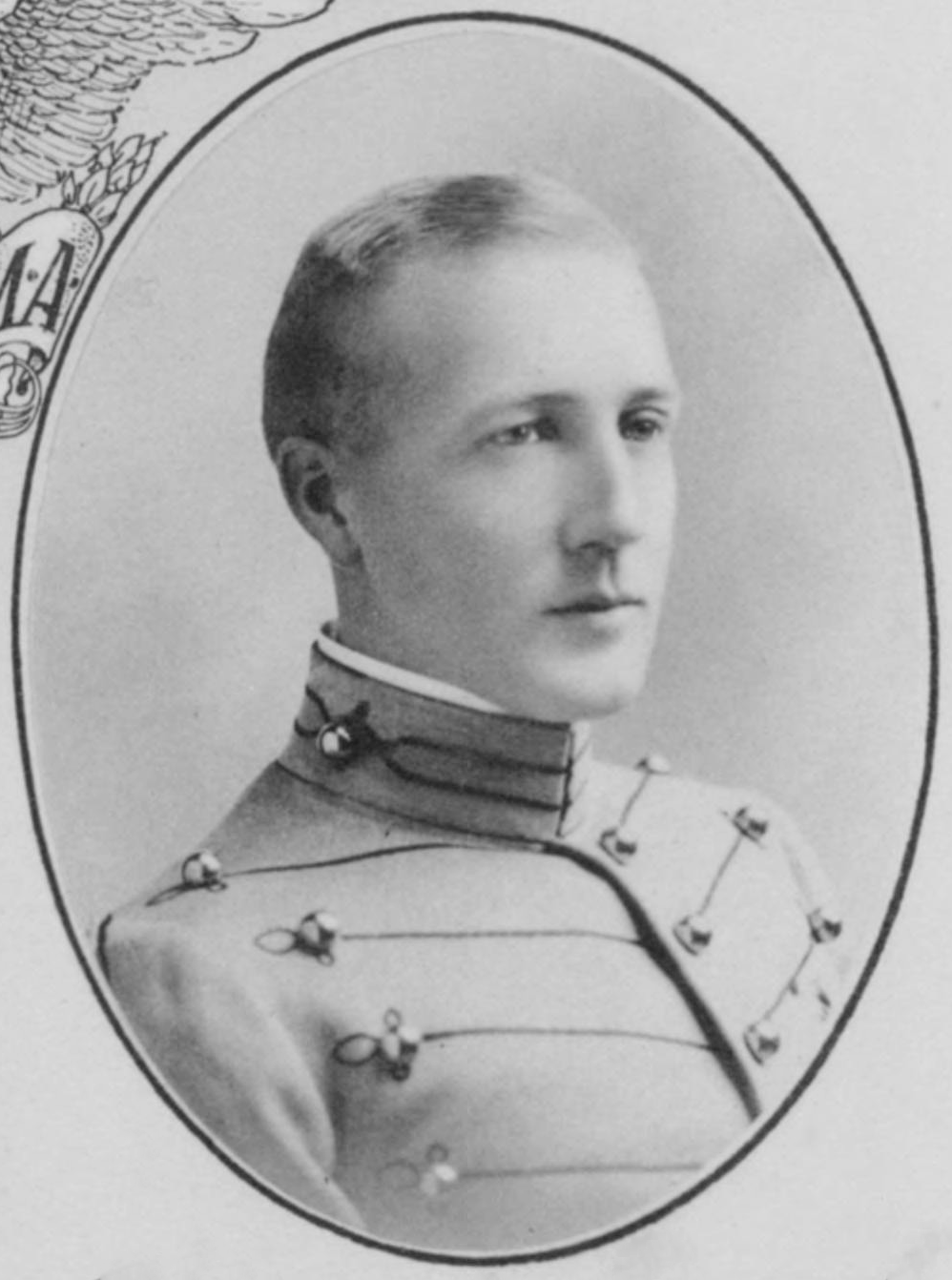
At West Point in 1914

He was admitted at the United States Military Academy at West Point, New York, in 1910. He graduated 36th in a class of 107 on June 12, 1914, and was commissioned a second lieutenant in the infantry branch. Ingles was assigned to the 4th Infantry at Fort Lawton, Washington. Among his fellow graduates included men such as William H. Holcombe, James B. Cress, Charles P. Gross, Brehon B. Somervell, Robert W. Crawford, Dabney O. Elliott, Arthur R. Harris, LaRhett L. Stuart, John B. Anderson, James L. Bradley, John H. Woodberry, Harold F. Loomis, Carl Spaatz, Harold R. Bull, Charles M. Milliken, Joseph W. Byron, Paul C. Paschal, Francis R. Kerr, Vicente Lim, Sylvester D. Downs Jr., Orlando Ward, Benjamin G. Weir, Ralph Royce, William O. Ryan, Frank W. Milburn, John B. Thompson and Jens A. Doe. All of them would later rise to the rank of brigadier general or higher in their later military careers.

Ingles saw service on the Mexican border during the Pancho Villa Expedition. During World War I, Ingles was appointed a commander of the military and technical training of Signal Corps officers and transferred to the Signal Corps in 1920 at his own request.

Between the wars, Ingles served on the various military assignments, including signal officer of the Philippine Division, instructor in communication at the Command and general staff College at Fort Leavenworth, Kansas, commander of the Army Signal Corps School, signal officer of the Third U.S. Army or signal officer of the Caribbean Defense Command.

== World War II ==
During 1942, Ingles was appointed the chief of staff of the Caribbean Defense Command, where he served under the command of Lieutenant General Frank M. Andrews. Ingles was appointed commanding general of the Panama Mobile Force in the same year. He served in this capacity until 1943 and was decorated with the Army Distinguished Service Medal for his service.

In 1943, Major General Ingles served a brief period as a deputy commander in chief of the U.S. European Theater of Operations and on July 1, 1943, he succeeded Major General Dawson Olmstead as a Chief Signal Officer of the U.S. Army.

Under his tenure, the Signal Corps grew into an important part of the American war effort. After the war, the Signal Corps kept abreast of new technology and made first radar contact with the Earth's Moon during Project Diana and broke a speed record for fastest radioteletype in April 1945.

== Postwar life ==
For his service during the World War II, Ingles received an Oak Leaf Cluster to his Army Distinguished Service Medal. Major general Harry C. Ingles retired from the Army in 1947 and subsequently was appointed a president of RCA Global Communications. He worked in this capacity from 1947 to 1953. He then worked for the National Broadcasting Company until 1969.

Ingles died at the age of 88 on August 15, 1976, in Bethesda, Maryland. He is buried together with his wife Grace Salisbury Ingles (1889–1977) at Arlington National Cemetery, Virginia.

== Decorations ==
Here is the ribbon bar of Major General Ingles:

1st Row	Army Distinguished Service Medal	Mexican Border Service Medal	World War I Victory Medal	American Defense Service Medal with Base Clasp
2nd Row	American Campaign Medal	European-African-Middle Eastern Campaign Medal	Asiatic-Pacific Campaign Medal	World War II Victory Medal
3rd Row	Commander of Order of the British Empire (United Kingdom)	Officer of the Legion of Honor (France)	Commander of Order of the Liberator (Venezuela)	Commander of the Order of Boyaca (Colombia)

Military offices
Preceded by Dawson Olmstead	Chief Signal Officer; July 1, 1943 – March 31, 1947	Succeeded by Spencer B. Akin
