= Harold Francis Loomis =

United States Army general

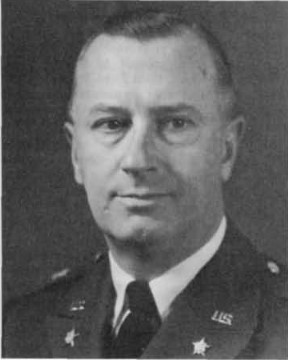
- Born: 20 June 1890; Rockville, Connecticut, United States
- Died: 21 October 1970 (aged 80); Washington, D.C., United States
- Burial place: West Point Cemetery, West Point, New York, United States
- Military career
- Allegiance: United States
- Branch: United States Army
- Service years: 1914–1946
- Rank: Brigadier General
- Nickname: "Loomy"
- Service number: 0-3702
- Unit: Coast Artillery Corps
- Commands: Harbor Defenses of Portland
- Conflicts: World War I World War II
- Awards: Legion of Merit; Army Distinguished Service Medal; Commendation Ribbon; Commander of the Order of the British Empire (UK); Officer of the Legion of Honor (France); Croix de Guerre with palm (France); Grand Officer of the Order of Nichan-Iftikar (Tunisia)

Brigadier General Harold Francis Loomis (19 June 1890 – 21 October 1970) was a United States Army officer who served in both World War I and World War II. A graduate of the United States Military Academy at West Point, New York, he was ranked 50th in the class of 1914. During World War II he was in charge of the French rearmament program in the North African Theater of Operations (NATOUSA) and later at Supreme Headquarters Allied Expeditionary Force (SHAEF). The French units he helped re-equip played an important role in the Italian and the Southern France campaigns.

== Early life ==
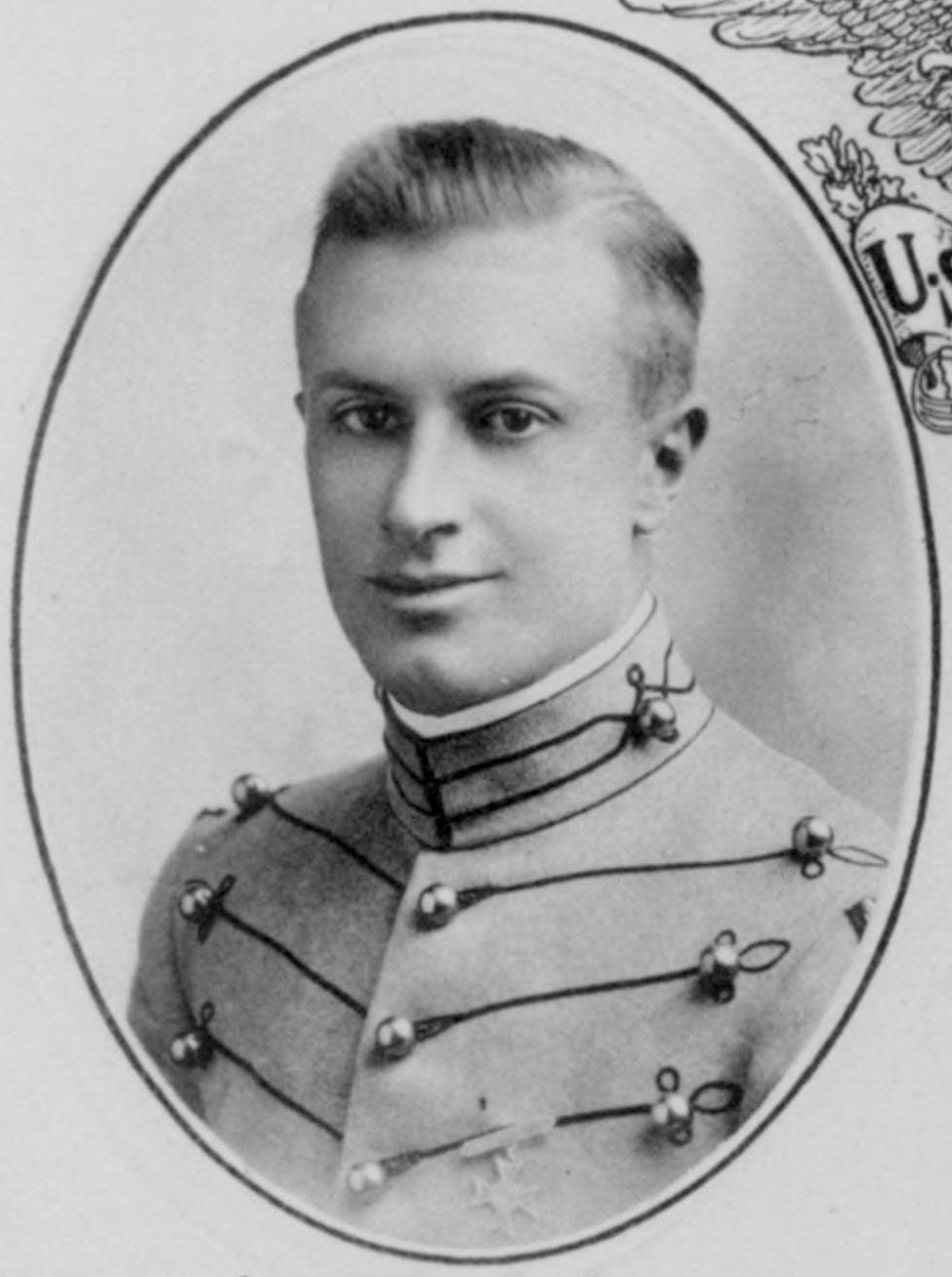
At West Point in 1914

Harold Francis Loomis was born in Rockville, Connecticut, on 19 June 1890. On 1 March 1910, he entered the United States Military Academy at West Point, New York, where he acquired the nickname "Loomy". He graduated 50th of 107 cadets on 12 June 1914, and was commissioned as a second lieutenant in the Coast Artillery Corps on 8 July 1914. His fellow graduates included men such as William H. Holcombe, James B. Cress, Charles P. Gross, Brehon B. Somervell, Robert W. Crawford, Dabney O. Elliott, Arthur R. Harris, LaRhett L. Stuart, John B. Anderson, Harry C. Ingles, James L. Bradley, John H. Woodberry, Carl Spaatz, Harold R. Bull, Charles M. Milliken, Joseph W. Byron, Paul C. Paschal, Francis R. Kerr, Vicente Lim, Sylvester D. Downs Jr., Orlando Ward, Benjamin G. Weir, Ralph Royce, William O. Ryan, Frank W. Milburn, John B. Thompson and Jens A. Doe. All of them would later rise to the rank of brigadier general or higher in their later military careers.

== World War I ==
Loomis's first assignment was in Paris, France, as an assistant to US military attaché there from 8 August to 8 September 1914, the outbreak of World War I. On returning to the United States he was assigned to Fort Monroe, Virginia. He married Elizabeth Kimberly in September 1915; they had no children. He was then posted to Fort Ruger in the Territory of Hawaii, where he was promoted to first lieutenant on 1 July 1916 and captain on 1 July 1917, and served as aide-de-camp to Brigadier Generals Charles Treat and John Philip Wisser, the commanders of the Hawaiian Department.

In April 1918, Loomis returned to United States, where he commanded a company at Fort Monroe, and then became an instructor in administration and military law at the Coast Artillery School there. He was promoted to major on 10 September 1918 and lieutenant colonel on 19 October 1918. He was the director of the non-commissioned officers school at the Coast Artillery School from 8 April 1919 to 11 June 1919. He served briefly with the American Expeditionary Forces in France until 6 October 1919, and then returned to the Coast Artillery School as an instructor.

== Between the wars ==
Loomis reverted to his substantive rank of captain on 11 February 1920, but was promoted to major again on 1 July. From 24 August 1920 to 1 July 1924 he was an instructor in modern languages at West Point. He attended the Advanced Course at the Coast Artillery School from 15 September 1924 to 15 June 1925, and served with the 7th Coast Artillery from 17 June 1925 until 1 August 1927.

After attending the Command and General Staff School at Fort Leavenworth, Kansas, from 24 August 1927 to 15 June 1928, Loomis he returned to the Coast Artillery School as an instructor in tactics. From 30 June 1932 to 17 October 1934 he was a student at the École supérieure de guerre in Paris. He served with the 62nd Coast Artillery at Fort Totten, New York, where he was promoted to lieutenant colonel on 1 September 1935, and then with the 2nd Coast Artillery. From 1 August 1938 to 30 June 1939 he attended the Army War College at Fort Humphreys, DC.

== World War II ==
Now qualified as a general staff officer, Loomis was assigned to the War Plans Division of the War Department General Staff in Washington, D.C. In this role he surveyed the coastal defences of the western hemisphere and chose sites for coastal defence guns. He was promoted to colonel on 1 July 1941 and brigadier general on 5 November. On 22 November he assumed command of the Harbor Defenses of Portland. On 17 May 1942, he moved to Jacksonville, Florida, as the commanding general of the Southern Sector of the Eastern Defense Command.

On 10 October 1943, Loomis became the chairman of the Joint Rearmament Commission (JRC) in the North African Theater of Operations (NATOUSA). As such, he was responsible for the rearmament of French Army units to enable them to participate in subsequent campaigns. There were doubts at the War Department about the reliability and efficiency of the French forces, but Loomis resisted proposals to equip them with cast off World War I-era weapons, and insisted on their being equipped to the same standard as American units. At the same time, he struggled to persuade the French to cut back on combat units, and form a balanced force with sufficient logistical units to support itself. In the latter he was less successful than he hoped, for despite frantic efforts, the French were unable to find sufficient skilled personnel. However, the exemplary performance of the French Expeditionary Corps in the Italian campaign amply vindicated Loomis's faith in the French Army and the rearmament program.

For his services in NATOUSA, Loomis was awarded the Distinguished Service Medal. His citation read:

[F]or exceptionally meritorious and distinguished services to the Government of the United States, in a duty of great responsibility, as Chairman of the Joint Rearmament Committee, from 11 October 1943 to 4 October 1944, in North Africa. General Loomis was charged with the coordination of all rearmament matters with the French authorities, the Lend-Lease Administration, and other agencies concerned with the rearmament of the French Air, Navy, and Ground Forces. He was further responsible for furnishing advisory and instructive services for the operation, instruction in the use and maintenance of United States equipment, and, finally, to advise and make recommendations to the theater commander in rearmament matters. His successful solution of the unusual administrative problems involved in controlling equipment and supplies furnished under the rearmament program was a major contribution to the successful participation of the French Forces in the allied war effort. By untiring efforts and great diplomacy, he earned the respect and admiration of all his associates, and contributed in a large degree to the furtherance of friendly relations between the Allied Forces.

After the successful Allied invasion of Southern France, in which rearmed French Army units participated, the rearmament program officially ended, and the JRC was disbanded. Loomis moved to Paris, where he joined the Supreme Headquarters Allied Expeditionary Force (SHAEF) as the head of its Rearmament Division. He was able to establish an excellent working relationship with the reconstituted French General Staff, particularly Colonel Clément Blanc, who had been a classmate at the École supérieure de guerre. Loomis was subsequently awarded the Legion of Merit for his service at SHAEF.

== Post-war ==
After the war, Loomis was chief of the Budget and Fiscal Section at Army Ground Forces headquarters from 15 October 45 until June 1946, for which he received the Commendation Ribbon. In addition to his American decorations, he was awarded the French Croix de Guerre with palm, and made an honorary Commander of the Order of the British Empire, Officer of the Legion of Honor and Grand Officer of the Tunisian Order of Nichan-Iftikar.

Loomis retired from the Army with the rank of brigadier general on 30 November 1946. In retirement he was the director of American Aid to France, Inc. Loomis lived in Washington, D.C., with his wife Elizabeth "Bessie" (Kimberly) Loomis. He died on 21 October 1970 of a cerebral hemorrhage at the Walter Reed Medical Center and was interred in West Point Cemetery.

== Dates of rank ==
Insignia	Rank	Component	Date	Reference
	Second lieutenant	Coast Artillery Corps	8 July 1914	
	First lieutenant	Coast Artillery Corps	1 July 1916	
	Captain	Coast Artillery Corps	1 July 1917	
	Major (temporary)	Coast Artillery Corps	10 September 1918	
	Lieutenant colonel (temporary)	Coast Artillery Corps	19 October 1918	
	Captain (reverted)	Coast Artillery Corps	11 February 1920	
	Major	Coast Artillery Corps	1 July 1920	
	Lieutenant colonel	Coast Artillery Corps	1 September 1935	
	Colonel	Army of the United States	1 July 1941	
	Brigadier general	Army of the United States	5 November 1941	
	Colonel	Coast Artillery Corps	1 September 1942	
	Brigadier general	Retired List	30 November 1946	

== Bibliography ==
- Ancell, R. Manning; Miller, Christine (1996). The Biographical Dictionary of World War II Generals and Flag Officers: The US Armed Forces. Westport, Connecticut: Greenwood Press. ISBN 0-313-29546-8.
- "Harold Francis Loomis". Assembly. XXX (1): 98. Spring 1970. ISSN 1041-2581.
- Conn, Stetson; Engelman, Rose C.; Fairchild, Byron (1961). Guarding the United States and Its Outposts (PDF). Washington, DC: Center of Military History, Department of the Army. Archived from the original (PDF) on 27 September 2012.
- Cullum, George W. (1920). Biographical Register of the Officers and Graduates of the US Military Academy at West Point New York since its Establishment in 1802: Supplement Volume VI 1910–1920. Chicago, Illinois: R. R. Donnelly and Sons, The Lakeside Press.
- Cullum, George W. (1930). Biographical Register of the Officers and Graduates of the US Military Academy at West Point New York Since Its Establishment in 1802: Supplement Volume VII 1920–1930. Chicago: R. R. Donnelly and Sons, The Lakeside Press.
- Cullum, George W. (1940). Biographical Register of the Officers and Graduates of the US Military Academy at West Point New York Since Its Establishment in 1802: Supplement Volume VIII 1930–1940. Chicago: R. R. Donnelly and Sons, The Lakeside Press.
- Cullum, George W. (1950). Biographical Register of the Officers and Graduates of the US Military Academy at West Point New York Since Its Establishment in 1802: Supplement Volume IX 1940–1950. Chicago: R. R. Donnelly and Sons, The Lakeside Press.
- Viongras, Marcel (1957). Rearming the French (PDF). Washington, DC: Office of the Chief of Military History, Department of the Army. Archived from the original (PDF) on 27 September 2012.
