= General Loomis =

General Loomis may refer to:

- Francis B. Loomis Jr. (1903–1989), U.S. Marine Corps major general
- Frederick Oscar Warren Loomis (1870–1937), Canadian Army major general
- Harold Francis Loomis (1890–1970), U.S. Army brigadier general
