= Frank W. Milburn =

American general (1892–1962)

Frank William Milburn
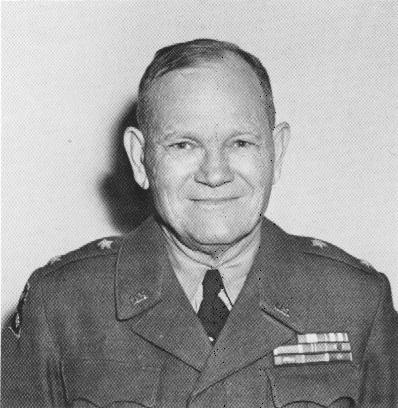
- Born: January 11, 1892; Jasper, Indiana, U.S.
- Died: October 25, 1962 (aged 70); Missoula, Montana, U.S.
- Military career
- Allegiance: United States
- Branch: United States Army
- Service years: 1914–1952
- Rank: Lieutenant general
- Nickname: "Shrimp"
- Service number: 0-3738
- Unit: Infantry Branch
- Commands: 11th Infantry Regiment; 83rd Infantry Division; XXI Corps; XXIII Corps; V Corps; 1st Infantry Division; Seventh Army; IX Corps; I Corps
- Conflicts: World War I World War II: Operation Dragoon; Colmar Pocket; Korean War: Battle of Pusan Perimeter
- Awards: Army Distinguished Service Medal (2); Silver Star (2); Legion of Merit; Bronze Star Medal; Order of Suvorov Second Class (Union of Soviet Socialist Republics)

Frank William Milburn (January 11, 1892 – October 25, 1962) was a senior United States Army officer who served during World War II and the Korean War. From December 1943, through the end of World War II, Milburn commanded the XXI Corps.

== Military career ==
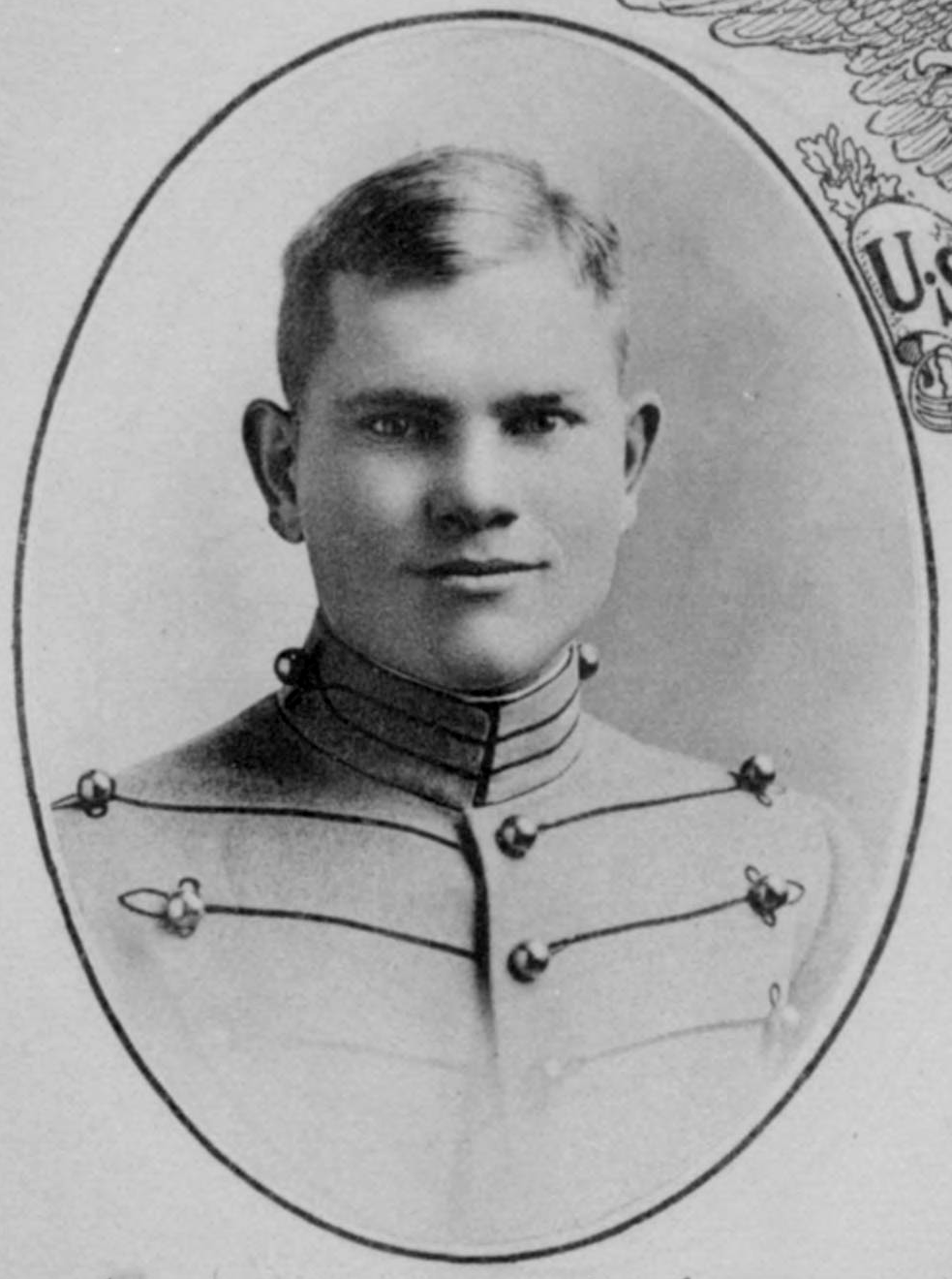
At West Point in 1914

Milburn attended the United States Military Academy and after graduating 99th in a class of 107 cadets was commissioned as a second lieutenant in June 1914. Among his fellow graduates included men such as William H. Holcombe, James B. Cress, Charles P. Gross, Brehon B. Somervell, Robert W. Crawford, Dabney O. Elliott, Arthur R. Harris, LaRhett L. Stuart, John B. Anderson, Harry C. Ingles, James L. Bradley, John H. Woodberry, Harold F. Loomis, Carl Spaatz, Harold R. Bull, Charles M. Milliken, Joseph W. Byron, Paul C. Paschal, Francis R. Kerr, Vicente Lim, Sylvester D. Downs Jr., Orlando Ward, Benjamin G. Weir, Ralph Royce, William O. Ryan, John B. Thompson and Jens A. Doe. All of them would later rise to the rank of brigadier general or higher in their later military careers

During World War I, Milburn served in the Panama Canal Zone. Subsequently, Milburn served in a variety of infantry assignments, among them the 5th, 33rd, 15th, and 28th Infantry Regiments.

A 1933 graduate of the Command and General Staff School (the school for higher command in U.S. Army), Milburn was promoted to brigadier general in early 1942 and selected to command the U.S. 83rd Infantry Division in August 1942. He was again promoted in September 1942 to the rank of major general. Milburn commanded the 83rd Division until December 1943, when he took over the newly formed U.S. XXI Corps.

Milburn commanded the XXI Corps for the remainder of World War II in Europe as part of the U.S. Seventh Army under General Alexander Patch. Milburn's XXI Corps played a decisive role in collapsing the Colmar Pocket in February 1945.

In his The History of the French First Army, General Jean de Lattre de Tassigny described General Milburn in this manner:

When I saw Maj.-Gen. Frank W. Milburn arrive at Rothau at 10.00 on the 25th January, lean and muscular and straight of eye, with the energetic features of a fighter, it did not take me long to know that I would find in him the most careful and loyal of subordinates. The steadfastness of his character, his clear view of realities and his leader-like authority, were apparent to me at once, and I felt that I could have complete confidence in him to bring to a successful conclusion the rough task which was going to fall to his U.S. 21st Army Corps.

Postwar, Milburn's tour of command of the XXI Corps ended in July 1945. Subsequently, Milburn served briefly as the acting commander for the Seventh Army and then the XXIII Corps. Milburn commanded the U.S. V Corps from November 1945 until June 1946. From June 1946 until May 1949, Milburn commanded the U.S. 1st Infantry Division. Promoted to lieutenant general in 1949, Milburn served as the deputy commander of U.S. Army Europe until 1950.

During the Korean War, Milburn temporarily commanded the U.S. IX Corps in August 1950. From September 1950 until June 1951, Milburn commanded the U.S. I Corps, supervising the invasion of North Korea in October and November 1950. For two days in December 1950, following the Chinese intervention into the conflict, Milburn was the acting commander of the U.S. Eighth Army until the arrival of General Matthew Ridgway, who was given command of the army after the death of General Walton Walker.

Milburn's career is remarkable for having commanded five corps of the U.S. Army. He retired from military service in April 1952.

== Athletics career ==
Milburn served as head football coach of the Montana Grizzlies from 1926 to 1930 and finished with an overall record of 18–22–3. He also served as head coach of the Montana Grizzlies baseball team in 1927, 1928 and again in 1953.

In 1953, Milburn also served as the athletic director at the University of Montana.

=== Football ===
Year	Team	Overall	Conference	Standing	Bowl/playoffs
Montana Grizzlies (Pacific Coast Conference) (1926–1930)
1926	Montana	3–5	0–4	8th	
1927	Montana	3–4–1	0–4	9th	
1928	Montana	4–5–1	0–5	10th	
1929	Montana	3–5–1	0–4–1	9th	
1930	Montana	5–3	1–3	7th	
Montana:		18–22–3	1–20–1		
Total:		18–22–3			

== Sources ==
- Encyclopedia of the Korean War. Spencer C. Tucker, ed. Santa Barbara, ABC-CLIO, 2000. ISBN 1-57607-029-8.
- The History of the French First Army. Jean de Lattre de Tassigny. London, George Allen & Unwin Ltd., 1952.
- Riviera to the Rhine. Jeffrey J. Clarke and Robert Ross Smith. Washington, Government Printing Office, 1993.
- U.S. Army World War II Corps Commanders. Robert H. Berlin. Fort Leavenworth, Command and General Staff College, 1989.
- Taaffe, Stephen R. (2013). Marshall and His Generals: U.S. Army Commanders in World War II. Lawrence, Kansas: University Press of Kansas. ISBN 978-0-7006-1942-9. OCLC 840162019.

Military offices
Preceded by Newly activated organization	Commanding General 83rd Infantry Division; 1942–1943	Succeeded by Robert C. Macon
Preceded by Newly activated organization	Commanding General XXI Corps; 1943–1945	Succeeded by Post deactivated
Preceded by Clarence R. Huebner	Commanding General V Corps; 1945−1946	Succeeded by Orlando Ward
Preceded by Clift Andrus	Commanding General 1st Infantry Division; 1946–1949	Succeeded by Ralph Canine
Preceded by Leland Hobbs	Commanding General IX Corps; August−September 1950	Succeeded by John B. Coulter
Preceded by John B. Coulter	Commanding General I Corps; 1950–1951	Succeeded by John W. O'Daniel
