= Frank Milburn =

Frank Milburn may refer to:

- Frank W. Milburn (1892–1962), American general
- Frank Pierce Milburn (1868–1926), American architect
