= Charles P. Gross =

American general (1898–1984)

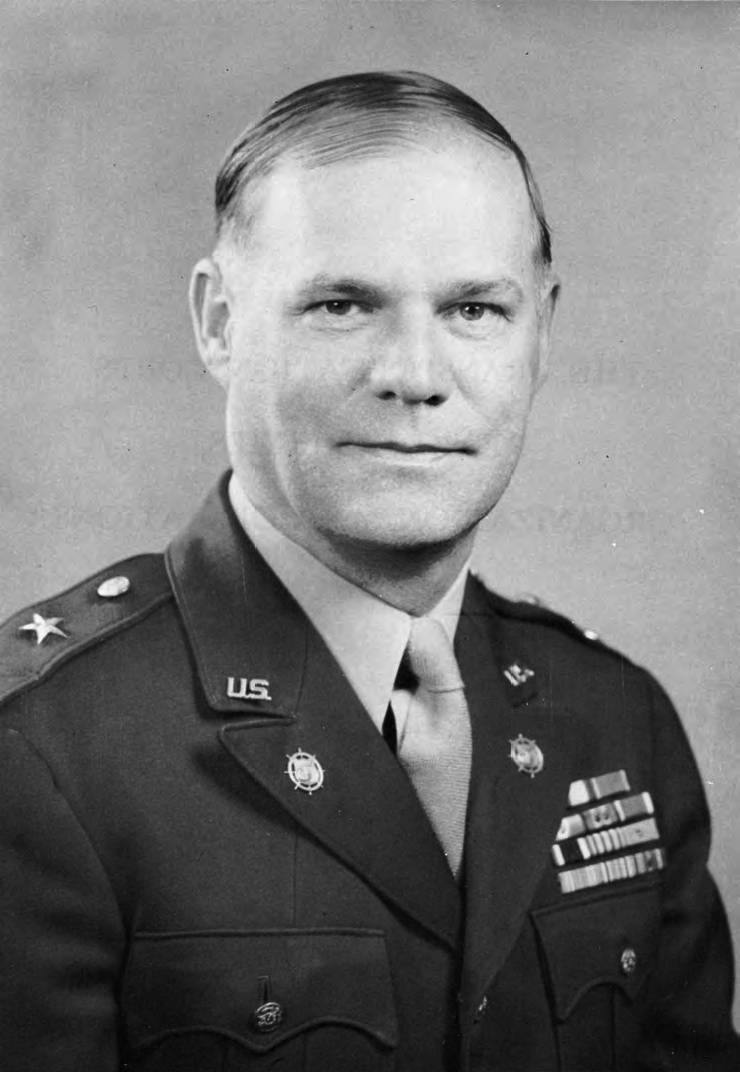
- Born: 14 March 1889; Brooklyn, New York, United States
- Died: 18 July 1975 (aged 86); West Point, New York, United States
- Burial place: West Point Cemetery, West Point, New York, United States
- Children: 5
- Military career
- Allegiance: United States
- Branch: United States Army
- Service years: 1914–1945; 1948–1952
- Rank: Major General
- Service number: O–3662
- Units: Corps of Engineers; Transportation Corps
- Commands: Transportation Corps; 29th Engineer Battalion; 318th Engineer Regiment
- Conflicts: World War I; World War II
- Awards: Army Distinguished Service Medal; Legion of Merit; Purple Heart; Commendation Ribbon; Commander of the Order of the British Empire (UK)
- Other work: Chairman of the New York City Board of Transportation

Signature
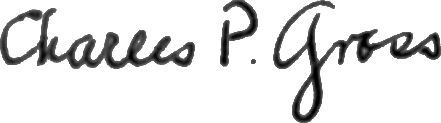

Major General Charles Philip Gross (14 March 1889 – 18 July 1975) was a United States Army officer who served in World War I and World War II. During World War II he was the Chief of the United States Army Transportation Corps. A graduate of Sibley College at Cornell University and the United States Military Academy at West Point, New York, class of 1914, ranked third in the class, Gross was commissioned in the Corps of Engineers. During World War I he was awarded the Purple Heart for bravery in the fighting in the Gérardmer sector of the Western Front and commanded the 318th Engineer Regiment in the Meuse-Argonne Offensive. After the war he commanded an engineer battalion engaged in a survey of the Inter-Oceanic Nicaragua Canal. He became Chief of the Transportation Corps in July 1942. In this role, he attended the top-level wartime conferences in Quebec in 1943, and Malta, Yalta and Potsdam in 1945. He was Chairman of the New York City Board of Transportation from 1945 to 1947. He returned to active duty in Germany in 1948 during the Berlin Blockade, and was Land Commissioner of Württemberg-Baden from 1949 to 1952.

== Early life ==
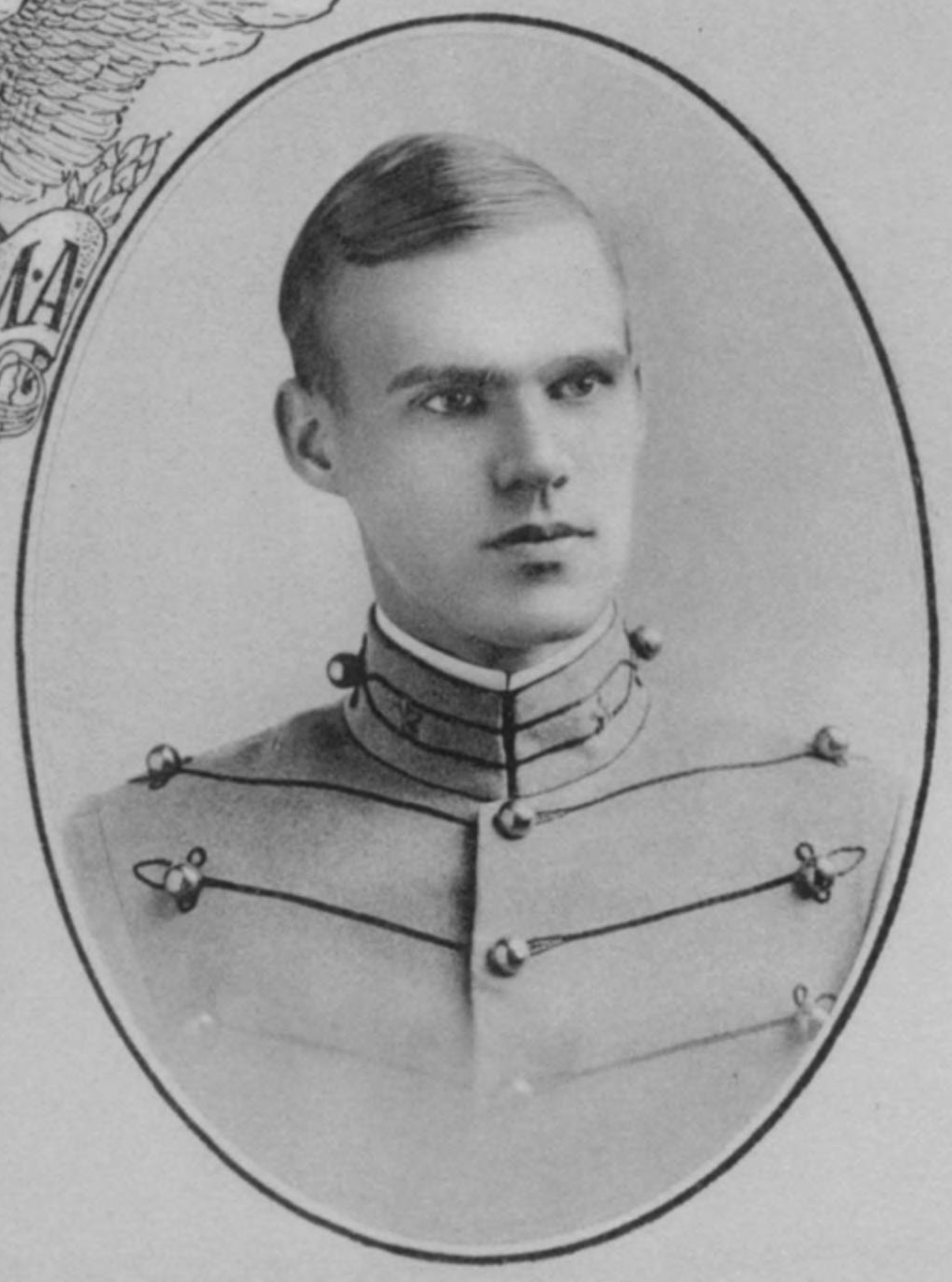
At West Point in 1914

Charles Philip Gross was born in Brooklyn, New York, on 14 March 1889, the second son of Frederick Charles Gross and his wife Elizabeth née Stoetzer. He was educated at Brooklyn's Public School 85 and Boys High School. He wanted to enter the United States Military Academy at West Point, New York, but was unable to secure an appointment. Instead, he entered Sibley College at Cornell University in 1906, but did not give up on the prospect of going to West Point. In 1910, he was offered a principal appointment by Congressman Charles B. Law, and he entered West Point on 1 March 1910. He asked permission for his entry to be delayed so that he could graduate from Cornell, but this was refused. Cornell awarded him his mechanical engineering degree anyway in 1921.

== World War I ==
Gross graduated on 12 September 1914, ranked third in his Class of 1914, and was commissioned as a second lieutenant in the Corps of Engineers. His classmates included Brehon B. Somervell, who was ranked sixth, and became a close personal friend; Harry Ingles, who was 36th; and Carl Spaatz, who was 57th. Gross married his boyhood sweetheart, Eleanor Marion Hubach, on 30 June. They had five children: Lucy Helen, Dorothea Katherine, John Edward, Nancy Ellen and Sheldon Harley.

Gross's first posting was to Texas City, where he witnessed the 1915 Galveston hurricane first hand. He was promoted to first lieutenant on 28 February 1915, and from 28 September 1915 to 22 December 1916 he attended the Army Engineer School at Washington Barracks. He then went to Vancouver Barracks, Washington, where he was engaged in surveying at American Lake. He was promoted to captain on 15 May 1917, a few weeks after the American entry into World War I, and major on 5 August, commanding a company and then a battalion of the 4th Engineers.

On 3 December he assumed command of a battalion of the 318th Engineers, which was part of the 6th Division, which deployed to the Western Front in France in mid-1918. He was promoted again, this time to lieutenant colonel, on 23 August 1918, and was awarded the Purple Heart for bravery in the fighting in the Gérardmer sector. He assumed command of the 318th Engineers, and led it in the Meuse–Argonne offensive. He was promoted to colonel on 3 November 1918, eight days before the Armistice with Germany which brought hostilities to a close.

After the fighting ended the 318th Engineers participated in the occupation of the Rhineland. He returned to the United States with the 318th Engineers in August 1919.

== Between the wars ==
On 3 October 1919, Gross, who was at the time in charge of fortification work on the Harbor Defenses of Long Island Sound, reverted to his substantive rank of captain, but he was promoted to major again on 1 July 1920. He commanded a battalion of the 5th Engineers at Camp Humphreys, Virginia, and then of the 13th Engineers. He returned to West Point in June 1922 as an instructor in the engineering department. In 1926 he attended the Command and General Staff College, graduating with honors. He was Los Angeles District Engineer from 1 July 1927 to 19 July 1929, and commanded the 29th Engineer Battalion. In October 1929 he went to Nicaragua, where he commanded an engineer battalion engaged in a survey of the Inter-Oceanic Nicaragua Canal.

Gross returned to the United States in July 1931 to attend the Army War College. After graduation, he joined the War Department General Staff (WDGS), on which he served from July 1932 to July 1936, supervising Civilian Conservation Corps works. He was promoted to lieutenant colonel again on 1 June 1935. He served on the staff of the Engineer School from August 1936 to August 1939, and in Nicaragua again with the Nicaraguan Barge Canal Survey until November 1939, when he became the Rock Island, Illinois, District Engineer, where he supervised flood control work.

== World War II ==
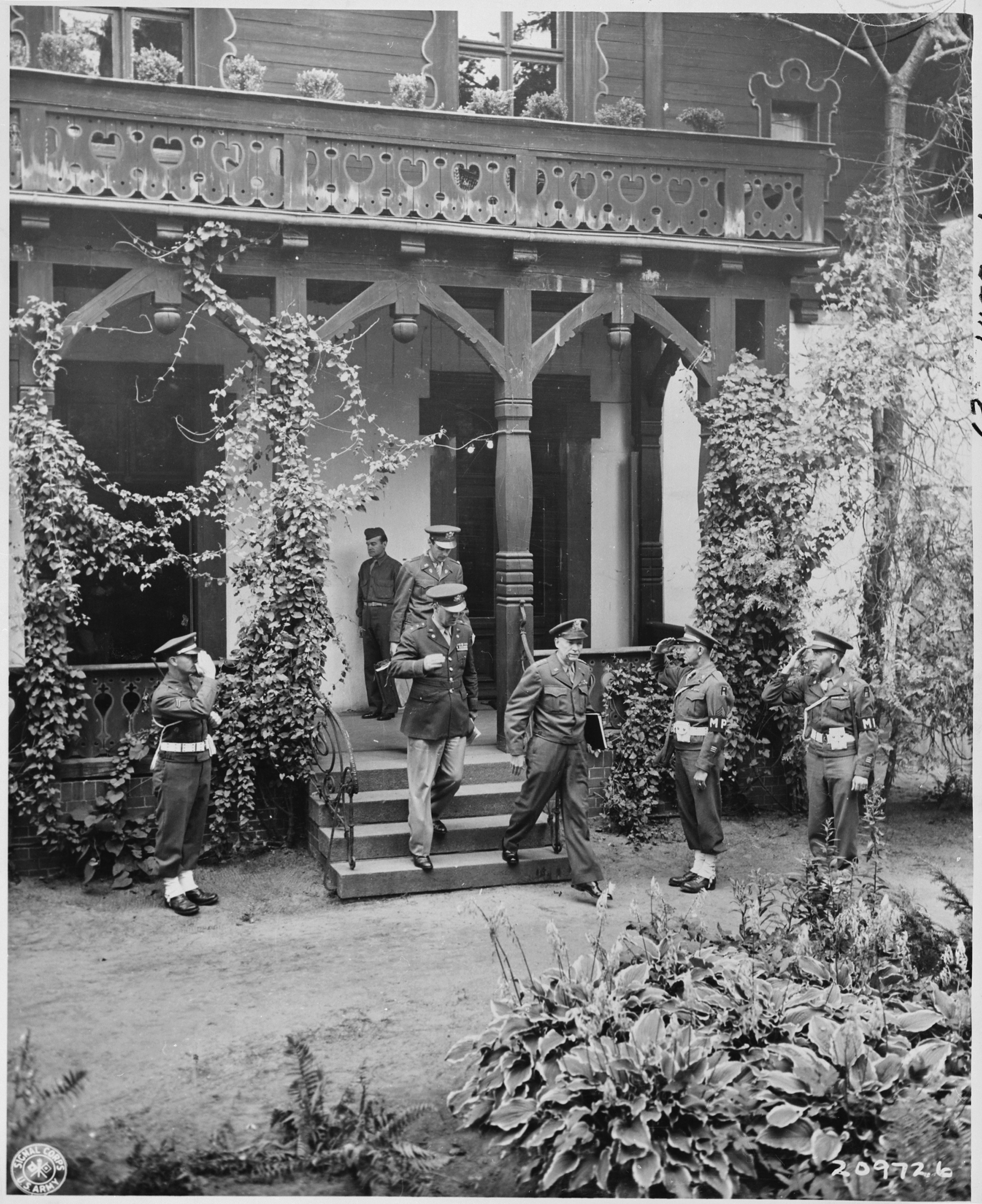
Somervell (center) leaves the Cecilienhof Palace, scene of the Potsdam Conference, with Gross (behind him)

In January 1941, Gross became the Chief Engineer of VI Corps, which was based in Providence, Rhode Island. In March, he returned to duty with the WDGS as the Chief of the Transportation Division in the Office of the Assistant Chief of Staff, G-4, who at this time was Brigadier General Eugene Reybold. With American entry into World War II imminent, Gross was promoted to colonel, the rank he had held during World War I, on 26 June. Reybold became Chief of Engineers and was succeeded by Somervell on 25 November 1941. Gross accompanied W. Averell Harriman and Lord Beaverbrook on the Harriman-Beaverbrook Mission to London and Moscow in September 1941, where he studied the transportation needs of the Red Army.

In a sweeping reorganisation of the War Department in March 1942, soon after the United States entered World War II, Gross's Transportation Division of the WDGS was merged with the Transportation Division of the Quartermaster Corps, which controlled field installations including the ports of embarkation and the regulating and reconsignment points that handled the flow of men and supplies. The Transportation Division was renamed the Transportation Service in July 1942, and became the Transportation Corps. The Transportation Corps was subordinated to Somervell's United States Army Services of Supply, and Gross was appointed its chief on Somervell's recommendation. This made him, as the head of a technical service, the equal of the Chief of Engineers. Gross was promoted to brigadier general on 11 March 1942, and major general on 9 August.

As the Chief of Transportation, Gross attended the top-level wartime conferences in Quebec in 1943, and Malta, Yalta and Potsdam in 1945. By VE Day, the Transportation Corps had shipped nearly three million troops and over eight million long tons (eight million metric tons) of supplies overseas. For his services as the Chief, Gross was awarded the Army Distinguished Service Medal, the Legion of Merit, and the Commendation Ribbon, and he was made an honorary Commander of the Order of the British Empire.

== Later life ==
Gross retired from the Army at his own request on 30 November 1945. The following day he was appointed the Chairman of the New York City Board of Transportation by Fiorello H. La Guardia, the Mayor of New York. La Guardia told him: "If you think war is Hell, then you have something waiting for you on this job." On 7 January 1946, Gross initiated a $260 million (equivalent to $3,935 million in 2024) three-year program to modernize the New York City Subway system by improving lighting, installing elevators, purchasing new rolling stock, lengthening trains, and constructing longer platforms to accommodate them. He advocated doubling the subway fare to 10 cents (equivalent to $2 in 2024), and called for the closure of the railway power stations. He rejected collective bargaining with the Transport Workers Union of America, which put him at odds with La Guardia's successor, William O'Dwyer, who sought to improve labor relations. Gross resigned on 18 October 1947.

On 15 June 1948, during the Berlin Blockade, Gross returned to active duty at his substantive rank of colonel as the Deputy Chief of the Transport Group in Office of Military Government, United States, in Germany. He was restored to his wartime rank of major general on 16 August, and became the Land Commissioner of Württemberg-Baden on 19 January 1949. He retired again in 1952, and moved to the French Riviera near Monaco. He returned to the United States in 1962, where he lived in Cornwall-on-Hudson, New York.

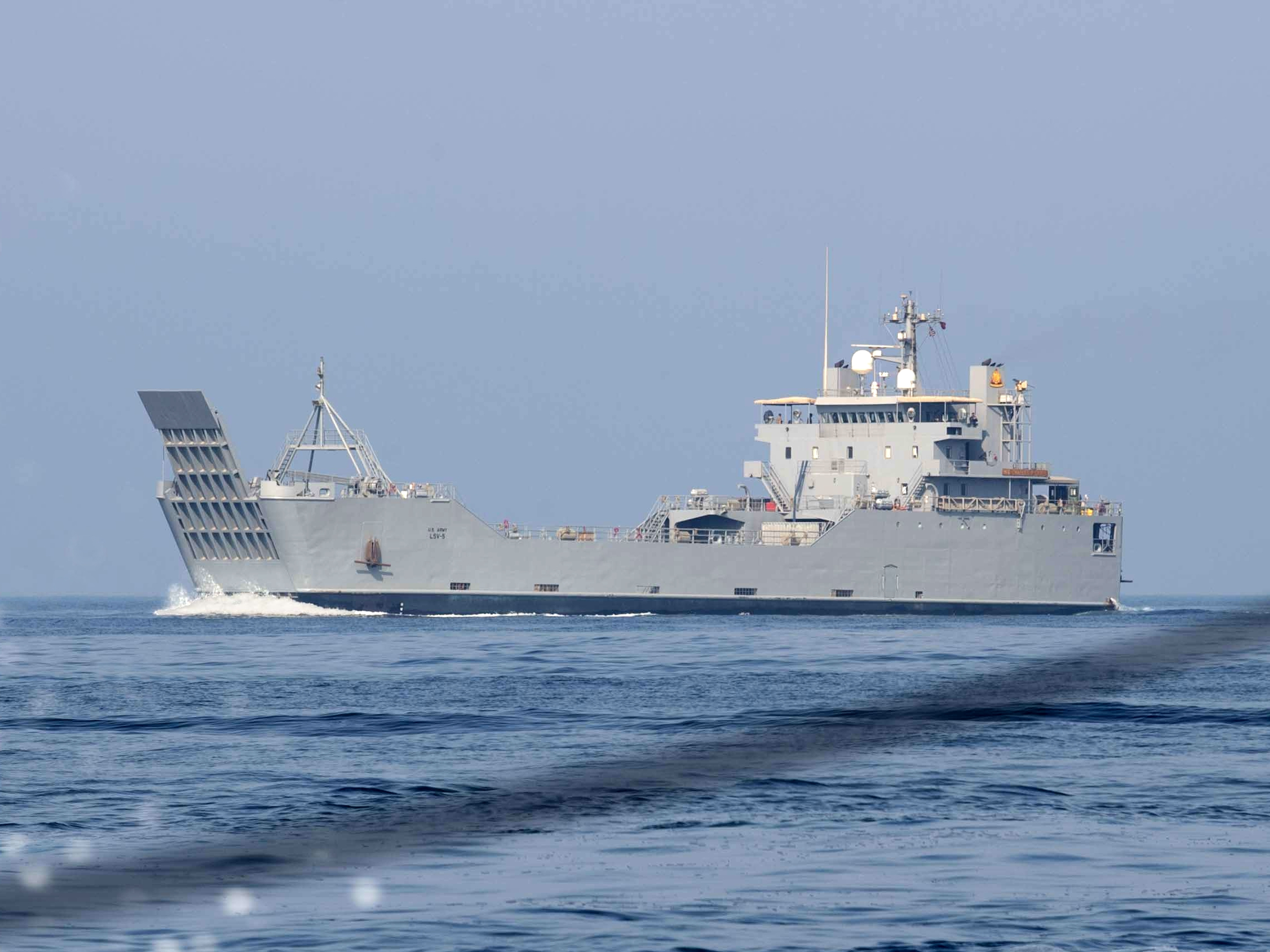
The USAV Major General Charles P. Gross

Gross died at the Army Hospital in West Point, New York, on 18 July 1975, and was buried in West Point Cemetery. The USAV Major General Charles P. Gross, a General Frank S. Besson-class logistics support vessel was named in his honor.

== Dates of rank ==
Insignia	Rank	Component	Date	Reference
	Second Lieutenant	Corps of Engineers	12 September 1914	
	First Lieutenant	Corps of Engineers	28 February 1915	
	Captain	Corps of Engineers	15 May 1917	
	Major	Corps of Engineers	5 August 1917	
	Lieutenant Colonel	Corps of Engineers	23 August 1918	
	Colonel	Corps of Engineers	3 November 1918	
	Captain (reverted)	Corps of Engineers	3 October 1919	
	Major	Corps of Engineers	1 July 1920	
	Lieutenant Colonel	Corps of Engineers	1 August 1935	
	Colonel	Army of the United States	26 June 1941	
	Brigadier General	Army of the United States	11 March 1942	
	Colonel	Corps of Engineers	1 July 1942	
	Major General	Army of the United States	9 August 1942	
	Colonel	Retired List	30 November 1945	
	Colonel	Transportation Corps	15 June 1948	
	Major General	Retired List	16 August 1948	
	Major General	Army of the United States	16 August 1948	
