= Orlando Ward =

US Army general (1891–1972)

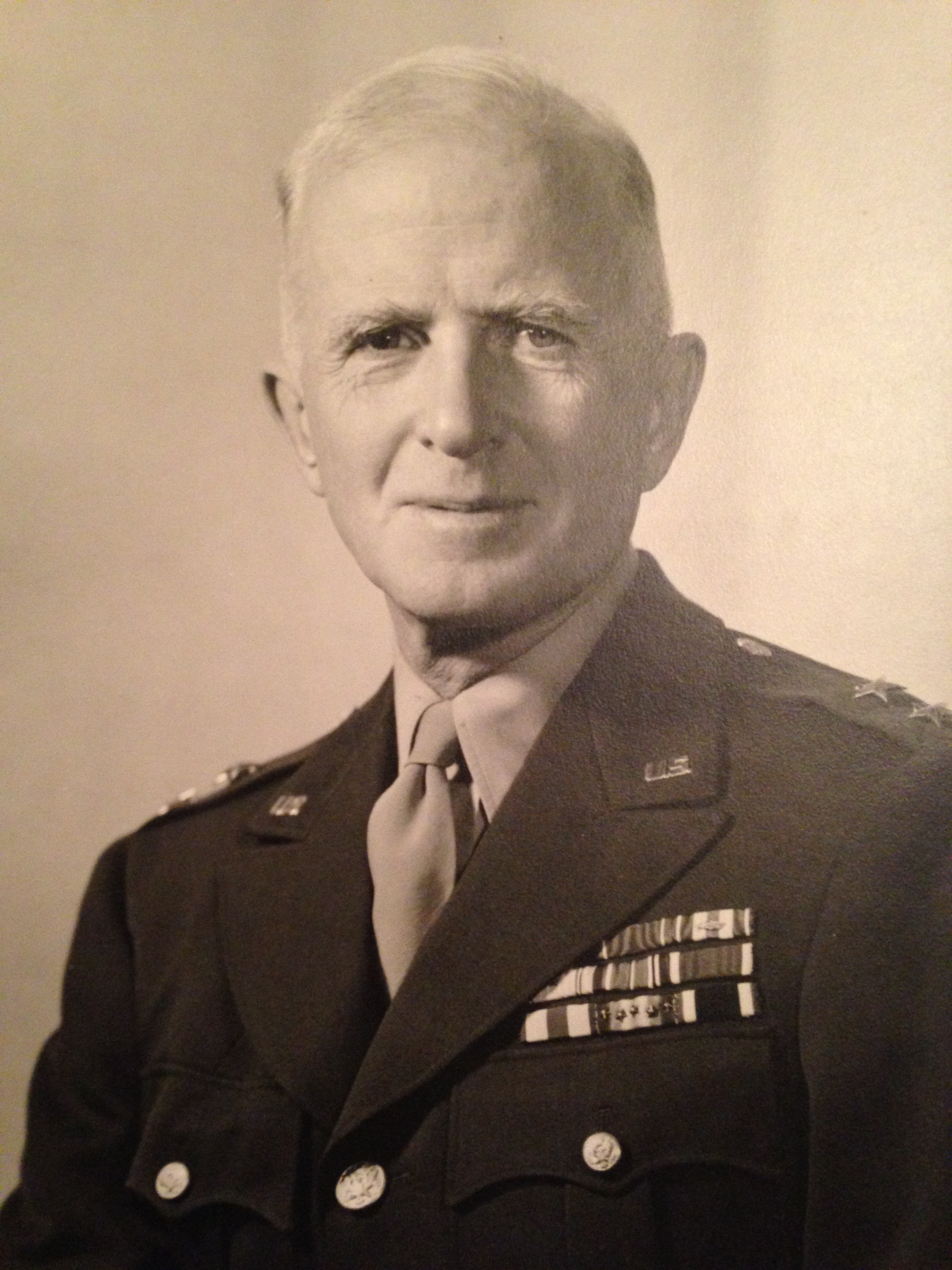
- Born: November 4, 1891; Macon, Missouri, U.S.
- Died: February 4, 1972 (aged 80); Denver, Colorado, U.S.
- Burial place: Fairmount Cemetery, Denver, Colorado, U.S.
- Military career
- Allegiance: United States
- Branch: United States Army
- Service years: 1914–1953
- Rank: Major General
- Service number: 0-3729
- Units: Cavalry Branch; Field Artillery Branch; Armor Branch
- Commands: 2nd Battalion, 10th Field Artillery Regiment; 1st Battalion, 83rd Field Artillery Regiment; 1st Armored Brigade; 1st Armored Division; United States Army Field Artillery School; 20th Armored Division; 6th Infantry Division; V Corps
- Conflicts: Pancho Villa Expedition; World War I World War II
- Awards: Distinguished Service Cross; Army Distinguished Service Medal; Silver Star; Purple Heart; Legion of Merit (2)

Major General Orlando Ward (November 4, 1891 – February 4, 1972) was a career United States Army officer who fought in both World War I and World War II. During the latter, as a major general, he commanded the 1st Armored Division during Operation Torch and during the first few months of the Tunisian campaign, before being relieved in March 1943. After returning to the United States to serve in training commands, he reentered combat as commander of the 20th Armored Dovision in Germany toward the end of the war.

Ward also served as Secretary to the Army Chief of Staff, General George C. Marshall, in the critical years prior to the war and made major contributions to field artillery procedures in the 1930s that, a decade later, made the American field artillery especially effective in World War II.

== Early life and military career ==
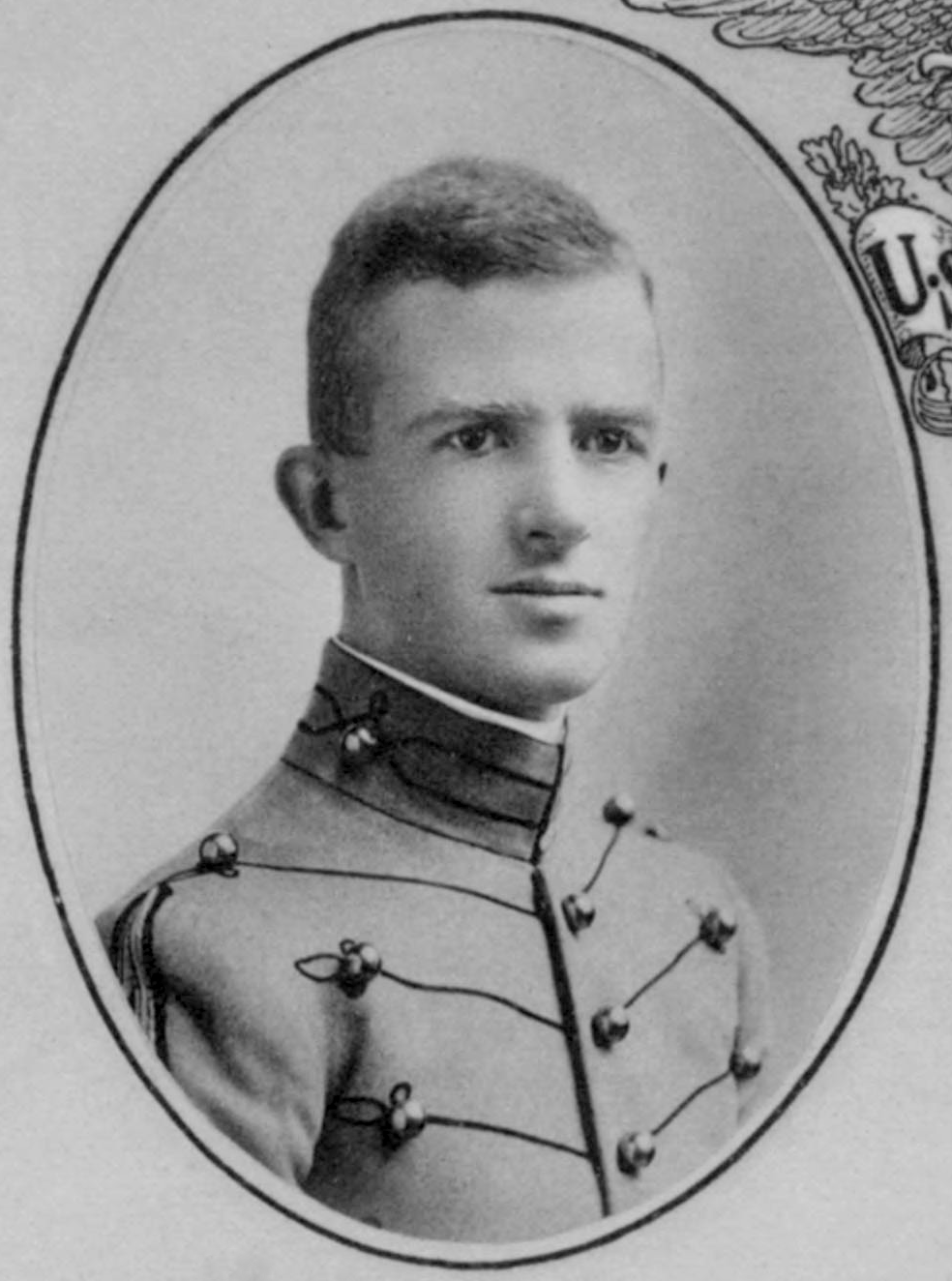
At West Point in 1914

Born in Macon, Missouri, on November 4, 1891, Orlando Ward, at the age of seventeen, entered the United States Military Academy (USMA) at West Point, New York, in March 1909, graduating five years later (after being held back due to problems with the French curriculum) 86 in a class of 107 on June 12, 1914, shortly before the outbreak of World War I in Europe, as a second lieutenant in the Cavalry Branch of the United States Army.

Ward's first assignment after graduation was as a commander of black cavalry troops, serving with 'E' Troop of the 9th Cavalry Regiment on border patrol in the wilds of Arizona and New Mexico. He later was part of Brigadier General John J. Pershing's forces chasing Pancho Villa into Mexico in 1916. He was awarded the Mexican Service Medal for serving in the Pancho Villa Expedition. Recognizing that the horse had a limited future, Ward became interested in artillery and transferred to the Field Artillery Branch and was sent to join the 10th Field Artillery Regiment at Camp Douglas, Arizona.

The United States entered World War I in April 1917, and Ward's regiment soon became part of the 3rd Division. He served on the Western Front with the American Expeditionary Forces (AEF) during the war. During the Second Battle of the Marne, in July 1918, under conditions that rendered other officers in charge useless, he took charge of the 2nd Battalion, 10th Field Artillery Regiment and kept the battalion effective until the tide of Germans was turned back. He was later awarded the Silver Star Citation for his actions. He continued to serve on the Western Front until the war ended with the Armistice with Germany on November 11, 1918. By that time he was attending the Command and General Staff School at Langres, from where he graduated in January 1919.

== Between the wars ==
During the quiet interwar period, he continued to serve in the field artillery, but was assigned posts like ROTC instructor at the University of Wisconsin–Madison (where Charles Lindbergh was one of his students). Eventually, he became an instructor at the U.S. Army Field Artillery School at Fort Sill, Oklahoma, where he and others developed key forward observer procedures that made the U.S. Army's artillery effective in the upcoming war. He attended the United States Army War College from August 1935 until June 1936. While he was there he was promoted to lieutenant colonel on November 25, 1935. Shortly after his graduation, he assumed command of the 1st Battalion, 83rd Field Artillery Regiment, which he commanded for over eighteen months until being assigned to the War Department, where he served as a staff officer in a variety of roles for the next few years.

== World War II ==
Ward was Secretary to General George C. Marshall, the U.S. Army Chief of Staff, from July 1939 to August 1941, a critical time of building up in preparation for the American entry into World War II. Ward assisted Marshall in finding the resources to build the military while political forces were fighting to keep the United States out of the war and to help Britain. During his assignment there, he worked closely with Walter Bedell Smith and Omar Bradley, both of whom went on to make vital combat contributions during the war. While he was there he received a promotion to the temporary rank of colonel on December 23, 1940. On August 5, 1941 he was promoted again, now to the temporary rank of brigadier general, shortly before assuming command of the 1st Armored Brigade in September. He was later awarded the Legion of Merit for his services during this period, with the medal's citation stating the following:

The President of the United States of America, authorized by Act of Congress, 20 July 1942, takes pleasure in presenting the Legion of Merit to Major General Orlando Ward (ASN: 0-3729), United States Army, for exceptionally meritorious conduct in the performance of outstanding service as Secretary of the War Department General Staff from 3 July 1939, to 30 August 1941. He displayed high executive ability and judgment in organizing the secretariat of the General Staff to meet the emergency of the early mobilization of the Army and later the shock of war. General Ward performed the exacting duties of secretary of the General Staff with vigor, force, and unflagging loyalty.

=== North Africa ===
He left that post (and was promoted to the two-star rank of major general) to become the second commander of the 1st Armored Division, a Regular Army formation, in March 1942, three months after the American entry into World War II. The division was sent to Northern Ireland in May and participated in numerous exercises with the British Army stationed there. In November he supervised the deployment of his division across the Atlantic Ocean to French North Africa, which was brought piecemeal as part of Operation Torch, the Allied invasion of French North Africa, and subsequent operations. The failure of the 1st Armored Division to arrive intact and deploy as a single entity would have important consequences in later action against German forces in the Tunisian Campaign.

The 1st Armored Division's first action against the Germans was not promising, when Combat Command 'B' (CCB) and other Allied forces were thrown back after an advance by German forces. On the night of December 10–11, 1942, during a withdrawal from Medjez el Bab, the focal point of the enemy attack, scores of combat vehicles of CCB—tanks, half-tracks, and tank destroyers — had bogged down in thick mud and had to be abandoned. The tanks were so badly mired that the advancing Germans themselves could not extricate them. It was a crippling loss. In its brief experience in action, CCB had lost 32 medium and 46 light tanks. The combat vehicles that remained were in poor condition after their long overland journey to the front lines.

At the Battle of Kasserine Pass in February 1943, the first major battle between the Americans and Germans during World War II, elements of the 1st Armored Division were sent reeling back by a series of sudden enemy offensive thrusts. The dispersal of the 1st Armored Division into separate combat commands across the front by British Lieutenant General Kenneth Anderson, commanding the British First Army, with the connivance of Ward's immediate superior, Major General Lloyd Fredendall, the U.S. II Corps commander, had angered Ward from the start, as it greatly weakened the division's ability to repulse concentrations of German armor and to shift his forces in response to enemy thrusts (Fredendall was later relieved of command and replaced by Major General George S. Patton). Elements of the 1st Armored Division at Faïd fell victim to one of Generalfeldmarschall Erwin Rommel's familiar tactics when they pursued German tanks feigning retirement into a screen of 88 mm high-velocity German anti-tank guns, resulting in large American armor losses.

After the rout at Kasserine, Patton at first counseled, then admonished Ward of the need for personal leadership of his division in order to keep German forces under pressure. Impatient with the progress of the 1st Armored Division, Patton took the unusual step of ordering Ward to personally lead a night assault on the Maknassy Heights, a series of stubbornly defended knolls in front of the 1st Armored Division's lines. Ward obeyed the order, and the attack was initially successful. Wounded in the eye, he was awarded a Purple Heart as well as a Silver Star, the citation for which reads:

The President of the United States of America, authorized by Act of Congress July 9, 1918, takes pleasure in presenting a Bronze Oak Leaf Cluster in lieu of a Second Award of the Silver Star to Major General Orlando Ward (ASN: 0-3729), United States Army, for gallantry in action in March 1943, when he distinguished himself in action against an armed enemy. General Ward with utter disregard for his own safety rallied and organized a successful attack of infantry and tank elements against a strongly held enemy position. The action of General Ward in the face of intense enemy fire from all classes of weapons reflects the finest traditions of the Armed Forces, and is deserving of the highest praise.

He was also later awarded the Distinguished Service Cross. The citation for the medal reads:

The President of the United States of America, authorized by Act of Congress July 9, 1918, takes pleasure in presenting the Distinguished Service Cross to Major General Orlando Ward (ASN: 0-3729), United States Army, for extraordinary heroism in connection with military operations against an armed enemy while serving as Commanding General of the 1st Armored Division, in action against enemy forces in March 1943 in Tunisia. Making a personal reconnaissance of the enemy position during the night preceding the attack, General Ward visited the forward elements of his armored infantry and tank units which were to make the assault. Throughout, he was under fire from high velocity guns and sweeping machine gun fire. He found hesitant reserves whom he organized into units and led forward. General Ward came upon forward troops pinned down by enemy fire and unready to proceed with the planned attack. Again he walked calmly among the men, calling attention to their own supporting artillery fire, illustrating that he could move without being hit. He reorganized scattered units, personally encouraged the wavering infantrymen, and then, radio communication to the tanks being out, walked through enemy fire to direct the gun fire of his tanks upon the objectives to neutralize the enemy machine gun fire and enable the assault teams to carry out their mission. He was wounded by a machine gun bullet but did not retire for medical attention until the attack was launched. Throughout the morning hours, his presence among the troops, his words of reason and encouragement, and his unconcerned progress across terrain bathed in machine gun fire, brought order out of confusion, courage out of hesitancy, progress out of inertia, and inspired a coordinated attack. Major General Ward's intrepid actions, personal bravery and zealous devotion to duty exemplify the highest traditions of the military forces of the United States and reflect great credit upon himself, the 1st Armored Division, and the United States Army.

However, the stalemate east of Maknassy continued, and it appeared to Patton that Ward was still overcautious and too reluctant to incur casualties when conducting offensive operations. By April 1, 1943 the American offensive that had begun at El Guettar had bogged down against stiffened Axis defenses. With the concurrence of British General Sir Harold R. L. G. Alexander, commander of the 18th Army Group (which controlled all Allied forces in North Africa), Patton finally relieved Ward of duty. Patton's actions were in keeping with personal written instructions to him from General Dwight D. Eisenhower, the Supreme Allied Commander in the Mediterranean Theater of Operations (MTO), after Fredendall was sacked: "You must not retain for one instant any man in a responsible position where you have become doubtful of his ability to do his job."

Recent scholarship suggests that political factors may also have played a significant part in Ward's relief. "Ward’s dismissal covered up Alexander’s incoherent plans for the American commitment to North Africa; in its wake, Patton’s failure to punch through the German line and prove American superiority was assuaged as well. Ike kept the upper-level alliance intact (if not healthy) by sacrificing the position of a lower-level subordinate."

Ward was replaced with Major General Ernest N. Harmon, the former commander of the 2nd Armored Division who had successfully intervened to remedy Fredendall's inaction during the battles of Kasserine Pass. Major General Ward was the only general relieved of his command by Patton during World War II.

=== Later World War II service ===
Returning to the United States, Ward was briefly commander of the U.S. Army Tank Destroyer School (Tank Destroyer Tactical and Firing Center) at Camp Hood, Texas before becoming Commandant of the United States Army Field Artillery School at Fort Sill, Oklahoma, where he had served as an instructor before the war.

In September 1944 he assumed command of the 20th Armored Division from Major General Roderick R. Allen. In February 1945 the division was sent overseas to the European Theater of Operations (ETO) to serve on the Western Front where it fought briefly in the Allied invasion of Germany, and assisting other divisions in the capture of the German city of Munich. The end of World War II in Europe came soon afterwards, on May 8, 1945, known now as Victory in Europe Day. Ward relinquished command of the division in August to Major General John W. Leonard.

For his services in World War II, Ward was twice awarded the Legion of Merit, along with the Silver Star and the Purple Heart, the Army Distinguished Service Medal and the DSC.

== Postwar ==
After the war, Ward briefly commanded V Corps between June and November 1946. Ward then had two major assignments, first as commander of the 6th Infantry Division (October 1946 to January 1949), in Korea (prior to the war there). He then served as Chief of Military History, where he oversaw the production of the famous "Green Books," the official U.S. Army history of World War II.

Major General Ward retired from the army in January 1953, after over 38 years of service as a commissioned officer. He returned to Denver, Colorado, where he remained until his death, aged 80, on February 4, 1972.

== Decorations ==
Major General Ward's decorations included the Distinguished Service Cross, the Army Distinguished Service Medal, the Silver Star with Oak Leaf Cluster, Legion of Merit with Oak Leaf Cluster, Purple Heart, the Mexican Border Service Medal, World War I Victory Medal with four campaign stars, Army of Occupation of Germany Medal, American Defense Service Medal, American Campaign Medal, European–African–Middle Eastern Campaign Medal with four campaign stars, World War II Victory Medal, Army of Occupation Medal and the National Defense Service Medal.

== Promotions ==
Insignia	Rank	Component	Date
No insignia	Cadet	United States Military Academy	March 1, 1909
	Second lieutenant	Regular Army	June 12, 1914
	First lieutenant	Regular Army	July 15, 1916
	Captain	Regular Army	May 15, 1917
	Major	National Army	July 3, 1918
	Captain	Regular Army	January 20, 1920
	Major	Regular Army	July 1, 1920
	Captain	Regular Army	December 18, 1922
	Major	Regular Army	June 22, 1923
	Lieutenant colonel	Regular Army	November 25, 1935
	Colonel	Army of the United States	December 23, 1940
	Brigadier general	Army of the United States	August 4, 1941
	Major general	Army of the United States	March 10, 1942
	Colonel	Regular Army	December 1, 1942
	Major general	Retired list	January 31, 1953

== Bibliography ==
- Rick Atkinson (2002). An Army at Dawn. Macmillan. ISBN 0-8050-6288-2.
- Martin Blumenson (2000). Kasserine Pass. Cooper Square Press. ISBN 0-8154-1099-9.
- Carlo D'Este (1996). Patton: A Genius for War. Harper-Collins. ISBN 9780060927622.
- Gugeler, Russell A. (2008). Major General Orlando Ward: Life of a Leader. Red Anvil Press. ISBN 978-1-932762-89-1.
- George F. Howe (1979). The Battle History of the 1st Armored Division. The Battery Press, Inc. ISBN 0-89839-025-7.
- Richard H. Johnson, Jr. (2009). Investigation into the Reliefs of Generals Orlando Ward and Terry Allen (PDF). US Army Command and General Staff College. Archived (PDF) from the original on October 7, 2016.

Military offices
Preceded by Bruce Magruder	Commanding General 1st Armored Division; 1942–1943	Succeeded by Ernest N. Harmon
Preceded by Jesmond D. Balmer	Commandant of the United States Army Field Artillery School; January–October 1944	Succeeded by Ralph McT. Pennell
Preceded by Roderick R. Allen	Commanding General 20th Armored Division; 1944–1945	Succeeded by John W. Leonard
Preceded by Frank W. Milburn	Commanding General V Corps; June–November 1946	Succeeded by Stafford LeRoy Irwin
Preceded by Albert E. Brown	Commanding General 6th Infantry Division; 1946–1949	Succeeded by Post deactivated
