= Robert W. Crawford (general) =

American Army general

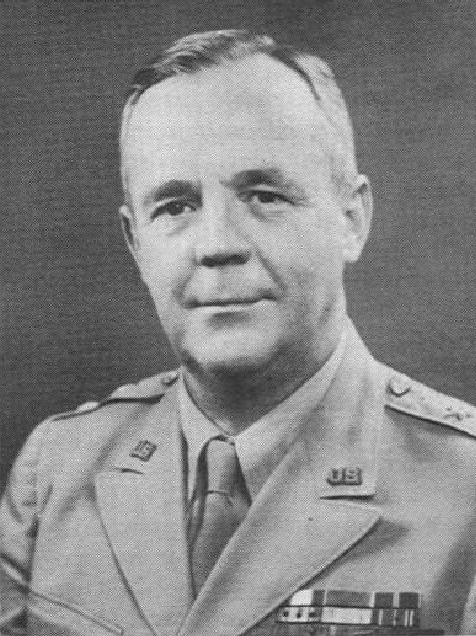
- Born: 17 September 1891; New York
- Died: 27 November 1981 (aged 90) Virginia Beach, Virginia
- Allegiance: United States
- Branch: United States Army
- Service years: 1914–1948
- Rank: Major General
- Commands: Mississippi River Commission; Service of Supply, U.S. Army Forces in the Middle East; Combat Command A, 8th Armored Division; 1st New Orleans District; Honolulu District; Duluth District; Provisional Battalion, 30th Engineers (Gas)
- Conflicts: World War I; World War II
- Awards: Distinguished Service Medal (2); Legion of Merit (2); Bronze Star Medal
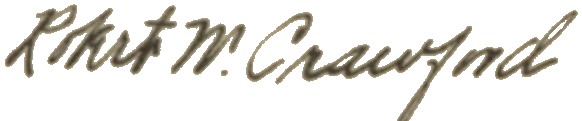
- Signature

Robert Walter Crawford (17 September 1891 – 27 November 1981) was a military engineer and United States Army major general. During World War II, he served as Assistant Chief of Staff for Supply (G-4) at Supreme Headquarters Allied Expeditionary Force under General Dwight D. Eisenhower.

== Early life and education ==
Crawford was raised in Warsaw, New York. In March 1909, he entered the United States Military Academy at West Point, where he participated in ice hockey, polo and lacrosse. After a leave of absence from November 1912 to August 1913, Crawford graduated 8th of 107 in the West Point Class of June 1914 and was commissioned in the Corps of Engineers. He graduated from the Engineer School in December 1916 and then taught electrical and mechanical engineering there until May 1917. Crawford later studied electrical engineering at Cornell University from October 1920 to July 1921. He graduated from the Command and General Staff School in June 1929 and the Army War College in June 1936.

== Military career ==
In May 1917, Crawford was promoted to captain and assigned to the 1st Engineers. In August 1917, he received a temporary promotion to major and embarked with his unit for France. In September 1917, Crawford was reassigned to the Chemical Warfare Service. From May to October 1918, he commanded the Provisional Battalion, 30th Engineers (Gas) in combat. Crawford then received a temporary promotion to lieutenant colonel and served with the 1st Gas Regiment for one month before returning to the United States.

In December 1918, Crawford returned to the Corps of Engineers. From July 1919 to October 1920, he was assigned to the engineer office in New York City. In October 1919, Crawford reverted to his permanent rank of captain before being promoted to major in July 1920. From July 1921 to August 1925, he served at the Chief of Engineers office in Washington, D.C. From August 1925 to August 1928, he was the district engineer in Duluth, Minnesota. From September 1929 to September 1931, Crawford was the district engineer in Honolulu, Hawaii. From October 1931 to March 1932, he again served as an instructor at the Engineer School before returning to the Chief of Engineers office. Promoted to lieutenant colonel in August 1935, Crawford served as a district engineer in New Orleans, Louisiana from July 1936 to March 1939.

From March 1939 to June 1942, Crawford was assigned to the Supply and Projects Section at the War Department. He received temporary promotions to colonel in June 1941 and brigadier general in December 1941. From July to December 1942, Crawford was commander of Combat Command A, 8th Armored Division at Camp Polk in Louisiana. He then served as commanding general, Service of Supply, U.S. Army Forces in the Middle East at Cairo, Egypt until June 1943. Crawford received a temporary promotion to major general in February 1943. Transferred to the supply staff in England, he became Assistant Chief of Staff for Supply (G-4) at SHAEF in March 1944.

After the war, Crawford served as president of the Mississippi River Commission from October 1945 until his retirement from active duty on 31 December 1948. His wartime promotion to major general was made permanent in January 1948.

== Later life ==
Crawford died in Virginia Beach, Virginia. He was buried at Arlington National Cemetery on 1 December 1981.
