= George Oscar Cress =

United States Army general

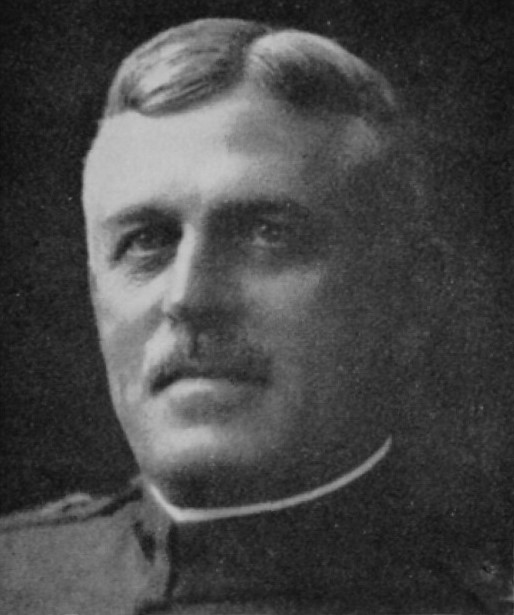
- Born: 18 September 1862; Warsaw, Illinois
- Died: 8 May 1954 (aged 91) Oakland, California
- Allegiance: United States of America
- Branch: United States Army
- Service years: 1884–1926
- Rank: Brigadier General
- Conflicts: Philippine–American War; Mexican Punitive Expedition; World War I

George Oscar Cress (18 September 1862 – 8 May 1954) was a United States military officer. He mostly served in various departmental and staff capacities and also taught as a professor of Military Science and Tactics.

== Early life and education ==
Cress was born on 18 September 1862 in Warsaw, Illinois to George and Mary Cress.

In June 1884, he graduated 27th of 37th from the United States Military Academy at West Point, New York, where he was a classmate of generals Irving Hale, Hiram M. Chittenden, Harry Taylor, William L. Sibert, Stephen Miller Foote, Eugene Frederick Ladd, Samuel D. Sturgis Jr., Everard Enos Hatch, DeRosey C. Cabell, Edwin Burr Babbitt, Farrand Sayre, Wilds P. Richardson, Grote Hutcheson, Henry Delp Styer, John Bellinger Bellinger, Robert Houston Noble, David C. Shanks, and Benjamin Clark Morse as well as Isaac Newton Lewis, the inventor of the Lewis gun.

Later, in 1911, he graduated from the Army War College.

== Military career ==
After graduating from the USMA, Cress was commissioned as a second lieutenant in the 7th Cavalry and from 1884 to 1889 served on the U.S. frontier. After his frontier duty, Cress was a professor of military science and tactics at Knox College in Galesburg, Illinois from 1889 to 1893. In 1891, he was transferred to the 4th Cavalry and, after his tenure as professor, was stationed at Fort Walla Walla in Washington state until 1897. Cress was then sent to Yellowstone National Park from 1897 to 1898, where he served in various commanding duties including as Quartermaster and Commissary and later as Acting Superintendent; after leaving Yellowstone, Cress was promoted to captain in 1899.

Cress later served with the cavalry in the Philippine–American War from 1899 to 1900 under the ill-fated General Henry Lawton. His distinction while in command of Troop G, 4th Cavalry earned him the nickname "Tiger of Luzon". After the Philippines, Cress acted as Constructing Quartermaster at the Cavalry School in Fort Riley, Kansas. He then returned to teaching Military Science and Tactics, this time at the Michigan Military Academy in Orchard Lake from 1904 to 1908. Cress later participated in the Mexican Punitive Expedition as a member of General John J. Pershing's staff. He was also part of the Inspector General's Department from 1916 until in 1918, when the U.S. entered World War I. Cress then organized the 49th Field Artillery Brigade and was promoted to brigadier general of the National Army on 1 October 1918, serving at that rank until 1 March 1919. After the war, Cress was in charge of militia affairs in the Southern Department and later became the commander of Columbus Barracks on 6 October 1919. He retired in September 1926 at the rank of colonel upon reaching the mandatory retirement age of 64. Cress was advanced to brigadier general on the retired list in June 1930.

== Personal life and death ==
Cress was married to Donna Scott Dean (30 October 1859 – 27 March 1957) on 26 May 1886. They had one son, Major General James B. Cress, who was a 1914 West Point graduate, and one daughter, Cornelia Van Ness Cress (20 November 1894 – 30 July 1979), who served as a Red Cross nurse during World War I and then operated a horse riding school from 1928 to 1954 at Mills College in Oakland, California.

Cress died at the Oak Knoll Naval Hospital in Oakland on 8 May 1954. He was interred at San Francisco National Cemetery.
