= Henry Delp Styer =

US Army brigadier general (1862–1944)

- Styer in 1918
- Born: 21 September 1862; Sellersville, Pennsylvania, US
- Died: 11 May 1944 (aged 81); Coronado, California, US
- Burial place: Arlington National Cemetery
- Education: United States Military Academy; United States Army Command and General Staff College; United States Army War College
- Spouse: Bessie Wilkes Styer (m. 1891–1953)
- Children: 3, including Wilhelm
- Military career
- Service: United States Army
- Service years: 1884–1919; 1919–1922
- Rank: Brigadier General
- Service number: 0–13371
- Unit: US Army Infantry Branch
- Commands: Fort Sidney; Fort Niagara; Company C, 13th Infantry Regiment; 2nd Battalion, 29th Infantry Regiment; 14th Infantry Regiment; 181st Infantry Brigade; 27th Infantry Regiment
- Conflicts: American Indian Wars; Spanish–American War; Philippine–American War; Moro Rebellion; Mexican Border War; World War I North Russia intervention
- Awards: Order of the Rising Sun (3rd class) (Japan); War Cross (Czechoslovakia)
- Other work: Special Representative, New York Life Insurance Company; Instructor, Oak Ridge Military Academy

Henry Delp Styer (21 September 1862 – 11 May 1944) was a career officer in the United States Army. A native of Sellersville, Pennsylvania and an 1884 graduate of the United States Military Academy, he served from 1884 until retiring in 1922 and attained the rank of brigadier general. Styer was a veteran of the American Indian Wars, Spanish–American War, Philippine–American War, Mexican Border War, World War I, and North Russia intervention, and his commands included the 27th Infantry Regiment and 181st Infantry Brigade. His awards and decorations included the Japanese Order of the Rising Sun (3rd class) and Czechoslovak War Cross.

== Early life ==
Henry D. Styer was born in Sellersville, Pennsylvania on 21 September 1862, the son of William Barrett Styer and Katharine (Delp) Styer. He was raised and educated in Sellersville, attended Franklin & Marshall College from 1877 to 1879, and worked as a schoolteacher. In 1880, he received an appointment to the United States Military Academy at West Point from U.S. Representative Reuben K. Bachman. Styer graduated in 1884 ranked 29th of 37. At graduation, he received his commission as a second lieutenant of Infantry.

Among Styer's classmates who attained general officer rank were: Irving Hale; Hiram M. Chittenden; Harry Taylor; William L. Sibert; Stephen Miller Foote; Eugene Frederick Ladd; Samuel D. Sturgis Jr.; Everard Enos Hatch; DeRosey Caroll Cabell; Edwin Burr Babbitt; Wilds P. Richardson; Grote Hutcheson; George Oscar Cress; Robert Houston Noble; and David C. Shanks. Among his notable classmates who did not become generals were: David du Bose Gaillard; Isaac Newton Lewis; and Powhatan Henry Clarke.

== Start of career ==
In June 1884, Styer began his career with American Indian Wars assignment to the 21st Infantry Regiment at Fort Fred Steele, Wyoming. He served in Wyoming until July 1886, when he was posted to Fort Duchesne, Utah. Styer was also a member of the Department of the Platte's rifle team from September 1884 to September 1886. In the summer of 1886, American Indians of the Uintah and Ouray Indian Reservation threatened warfare over mistreatment by indian agents. Frederick Benteen, commander of the force that responded, succeeded in lowering tensions by promising that if the Ute people remained on their reservation, the corruption would be halted and the Utes would not be disturbed by the army. As part of this response, Benteen dispatched soldiers under Styer to guard the reservation's indian agency headquarters. In February 1888, he escorted a detachment of recruits to Fort Sidney, Nebraska, after which he commanded the detachment and the post. In July 1888, he was assigned to duty at Fort Douglas, Utah. In May 1891, Styer was promoted to first lieutenant in the 22nd Infantry and continued to serve at Fort Douglas. In July 1891, Styer transferred to the 13th Infantry and was assigned to Fort Reno, Indian Territory, where he served until September 1892.

In September 1892, Styer was assigned as professor of military science at Utah Agricultural College (now Utah State University), where he remained until September 1896. Styer was next assigned to Fort Niagara, New York, where he commanded the post and a detachment of 13th Infantry soldiers that trained recruits for and shipped supplies to units bound for Cuba during the Spanish–American War, as well as performing security and patrol duties on the US-Canada border. In a May 1898 incident that made national headlines, journalists reported a rumor that soldiers had captured two Spanish spies at Fort Niagara. Styer clarified in subsequent reports that two men had approached the fort by boat at night and asked him to enlist them, but they looked disreputable, so told them to leave, after which he did not see them again. He was promoted to captain in October 1898 and later received the Spanish War Service Medal. In April 1899, Styer was in command of Company C, 13th Infantry when he was assigned to Philippine–American War duty, and in August 1899 he was appointed regimental quartermaster. Styer served in the Philippines until July 1902, then was assigned to Fort McDowell, California, where he continued as the 13th Infantry's quartermaster until April 1903. He remained with the 13th Infantry at Fort McDowell until July 1903. Styer later received the Philippine Campaign Medal to recognize his performance of duty during this conflict.

=== Family ===
In 1891, Styer married Bessie Wilkes of Salt Lake City, who was the granddaughter of Rear Admiral Charles Wilkes. They were married until his death and were the parents of three children:

- Wilhelm D. Styer (1893–1975), a US Army lieutenant general
- Charles Wilkes Styer (1897–1976), a rear admiral in the US Navy
- Katherine Elizabeth "Bess" Styer (1904–1975), who was married three times, including twice to US Navy admirals, and from 1944 to 1948 was the first woman to serve on the Coronado, California City Council.

== Continued career ==
Styer at his desk during World War I

In July 1903, Styer was again assigned as professor of military science at Utah Agricultural College, where he served until October 1906. He was then assigned to Moro Rebellion duty as acting judge advocate of the Department of Luzon, Philippines, where he remained until August 1909. He was promoted to major in the 29th Infantry in May 1907. After returning from the Philippines, he was again assigned to Fort Niagara, this time as commander of the 29th Infantry's 2nd Battalion. In November 1912, Styer was promoted to lieutenant colonel in the 17th Infantry. In January 1913, he was assigned as a student in the course for senior officers at the Army Service Schools (now the United States Army Command and General Staff College). After graduation, he was assigned to Mexican Border War duty with the 2nd Division in Texas City, Texas. In late 1913, Styer was walking in Washington, DC with his father-in-law, Major (Retired) Edmund Wilkes when they were struck by a car; Styer recovered, but Wilkes's injuries were fatal. Styer graduated from the United States Army War College in 1914, after which he was assigned as senior inspector and instructor for the New Jersey National Guard.

Styer during his 1918–1919 service in Siberia

In July 1916, Styer was promoted to colonel and assigned to command the 14th Infantry Regiment, first at Fort Yuma, Arizona, and later at Vancouver Barracks, Washington. American entry into World War I took place in April 1917, and in August Styer was promoted to temporary brigadier general as the army expanded. He was then assigned to command the 181st Infantry Brigade, a unit of the 91st Division, during its organization and training at Camp Lewis, Washington.

== Later career ==
Styer's gravestone at Arlington National Cemetery

In March 1918, Styer was reduced from his temporary brigadier general's rank to his permanent rank of colonel so he could command the 27th Infantry Regiment, part of American Expeditionary Force, Siberia. He served in the North Russia intervention until early 1919, leading American "doughboys" partnered with Allies including Japanese and Czech forces as they guarded segments of the vital Trans-Siberian Railway and prevented weapons intended for the White Russians during the Russian Civil War from falling into the hands of the Bolsheviks. As the senor American commander during the early phases of the intervention, Styer accepted the assertion of Japanese commander Kikuzo Otani that the Allies had committed to unified operations under Otani's leadership. When Otani claimed 15,000 Bolsheviks and armed German and Austrian prisoners of war threatened Vladivostok, Styer and his troops took part in Otani's joint offensive along the railway. When William S. Graves arrived to assume command of US forces, he carried orders from President Woodrow Wilson directing US neutrality in Russian affairs, which ended Otani's command of the joint Allied force.

Sign marking location of VFW Post 2422, named for Styer

In early 1919, Styer returned to the United States and requested retirement, which was approved in April. Styer received the Order of the Rising Sun (3rd class) from Japan and the War Cross from Czechoslovakia in recognition of his Siberian service. (Note: As the descendant of Czech migrants to the United States, Styer was highly regarded by the Czech government.) After retiring, Styer was employed as a special representative of the New York Life Insurance Company. In November 1919, Styer was recalled to active duty and assigned to recruiting activities in Detroit, and he remained in uniform until retiring again in September 1922. From 1924 to 1925, he was an instructor at Oak Ridge Military Academy, North Carolina. In June 1930, the US Congress enacted legislation permitting First World War general officers to retire at their highest rank, and Styer was promoted to brigadier general on the retired list. In 1941, Styer was elected national commander of the Veterans of the American Expeditionary Forces, Siberia. His residences during his retirement included Youngstown, New York and Eagle Lake, Florida. Styer and his wife also traveled extensively, including trips throughout the United States and to Europe, South America, and Asia. He later resided in Coronado, California, where he died on 11 May 1944. Styer was buried at Arlington National Cemetery. Styer donated land to the Veterans of Foreign Wars to use in establishing a post in Coronado; Post 2422 was named in his honor.

== Dates of rank ==
- Second Lieutenant, 15 June 1884
- First Lieutenant, 19 May 1891
- Captain, 4 October 1898
- Major, 6 May 1907
- Lieutenant Colonel, 12 November 1912
- Colonel, 1 July 1916
- Brigadier General (National Army), 5 August 1917
- Colonel, 30 March 1918
- Colonel (Retired), 10 April 1919
- Colonel, 26 November 1919
- Colonel (Retired), 10 September 1922
- Brigadier General (Retired), 21 June 1930

== Works by ==
- Von Hildebrandt, Hugo (August 1904). "The Great Manchurian–Siberian Railway". The United States Service. Translated by Styer, Henry D. New York, New York: L. R. Hamersly Jr. pp. 214–220 – via Google Books.
