= The Advertising Club of New York =

Advertising industry group

The Advertising Club of New York, also known as The Ad Club and originally called the Sphinx Club, is an advertising industry group promoting self-regulation, professional training and good fellowship. The Club offers the community access to conversations and key influencers, training for professional development, and networking and diversity initiatives.

== Origins ==
In 1896, a group of eight men working in advertising in New York City began meeting for lunch on a regular basis to share ideas on the business that sustained their livelihood. They called themselves the Sphinx Club, and in 1906 this group incorporated as the Advertising Men's League, eventually becoming The Advertising Club of New York in 1915.

Most of The Ad Club's early years were spent at the Stanford White building at 23 Park Avenue, where Ad Club members, including the young Bill Paley, J.C. Penney, and Bill Bernbach, conducted business in the main dining room over lunch.

== Initiatives ==
- 1906: First formal course in advertising to be offered by an educational institution at New York University (NYU).
- 1911: The first supporter of the "truth in advertising" program, which remains a hallmark of consumer protection and formed the first "Vigilance Committee", which evolved into today's Better Business Bureau.
- 1923: Held the first-ever advertising exposition at the 71st Regiment Armory, with an attendance of over 58,000.
- 1949: Founded the Advertising Hall of Fame. It was turned over to the American Advertising Federation in 1973.
- 1964: Founded the International ANDY Awards to recognize creative excellence in advertising and to raise the standards of craftsmanship in industry.

== List of presidents ==
- 2005–Present Gina Grillo, Chief Executive Officer
- 2003–2005 Renee V. H. Simons, Managing Director, J P Morgan Chase
- 2001 - 2003 Robert Mate, VP/Publishing Director, Meredith Corporation
- 1999 - 2001 Carla Loffredo, Sr. Partner/Director, Brand Comm, J. Walter Thompson
- 1998 - 1999 Steven Farella, jordanmcgrathcase & partners
- 1997 - 1998 Joanne Davis, Bozell Worldwide
- 1996 - 1997 R. Jeffrey Petersen, Architectural Digest
- 1995 - 1996 Ronald S. Fierman, Warwick Baker O'Neill
- 1994 - 1995 Susan C. Russo, The New York Times
- 1993 - 1994 Wenda Harris Millard, Family Circle
- 1991 - 1993 Wilder D. Baker, Warwick, Baker & Fiore
- 1989 - 1991 William F. Marlieb, General Media International
- 1987 - 1989 Richard D. O'Connor, Lintas: Campbell-Ewald
- 1985 - 1987 Leslie Winthrop, Advertising Agency Register
- 1982 - 1985 Judy Guerin de Neco, Judy Guerin, Inc.
- 1981 - 1982 Michael Chamberlin, Lebhar-Friedman
- 1979 - 1981 Fred R. Messner, Poppe Tyson
- 1978 - 1979 Al Ries, Ries, Cappiello, Colwell
- 1976 - 1978 Michael Chamberlin, Lebhar-Friedman
- 1974 - 1976 Edward Malluk, Timely Linens
- 1973 - 1974 Vincent A. Carberry, Precision Valve Corporation
- 1971 - 1973 Charles E. Ballard, Winius-Brandon Company
- 1969 - 1971 Milton Riback, Milton Riback, Inc.
- 1967 - 1969 William T. Leslie, TWA
- 1964 - 1967 Walter B. Bruce, American Can
- 1963 - 1964 Mervin P. Bickley, United Airlines
- 1960 - 1963 Horace H. Nahm, Hooven Letters
- 1959 - 1960 Gene Flack, Sunshine Biscuit Co.
- 1957 - 1959 Robert M. Gray, Esso Standard Oil
- 1955 - 1957 Thomas B. Haire, Haire Publishing
- 1953 - 1955 George A. Phillips
- 1951 - 1953 George S. McMillan, Bristol-Myers
- 1950 - 1951 Frank M. Head, United Cigar-Whelan Stores
- 1948 - 1950 Andrew J. Haire, Haire Publishing
- 1946 - 1948 Eugene S. Thomas, Bamberger Broadcasting Service
- 1944 - 1946 Allan T. Preyer, Vick Chemical Company
- 1942 - 1944 John A. Zellers, Remington Rand
- 1941 - 1942 I.S. Randall
- 1939 - 1941 G. Lynn Sumner, G. Lynn Sumner Co.
- 1937 - 1939 Lowell Thomas, television anchor
- 1935 - 1937 H.B. LeQuatte, Churchill-Hall Advertising
- 1932 - 1935 Grover A. Whalen, John Wanamaker
- 1930 - 1932 Charles E. Murphy, Murphy, Block, Sullivan & Sawyer
- 1929 - 1930 James Wright Brown, Editor & Publisher
- 1927 - 1929 Gilbert T. Hodges, The Sun
- 1925 - 1927 James P. GillroyCharles C. Green, Charles C. Green Advertising Agency
- 1923 - 1925 H.H. Charles, H.H. Charles Advertising Service
- 1922 - 1923 C. King Woodbridge, The Dictaphone Co.
- 1921 - 1922 Frank E. Fehlman, Churchill-Hall Advertising
- 1919 - 1921 George W. Hopkins, Columbia Gramophone Co.
- 1919 - 1919 F.A. Wilson-Lawrenson, Associated Press
- 1917 - 1919 George B. Sharpe, DeLaval Separator Co.
- 1914 - 1917 Harry Tipper, Automotive Industries
- 1908 - 1914 William H. Ingersoll, Robert Ingersoll & Bros.
- 1907 - 1908 Gerald B. Wadsworth
- 1906 - 1907 Charles Capehart
- 1896 - 1905 Data not available

Thirteen Presidents from the first 20 years of the organization include: M.M. Gillam, Artemas Ward, Herbert B Harding, Frank Presbrey, F. James Gibson (founder and first president), Samuel Brill, Phillip A Conne, W.R. Hotchkin, George B Van Cleve, Collin Armstrong, E.D. Gibbs, Henry C Brown and Preston P Lynn.
