= DeRosey Caroll Cabell =

United States Army general

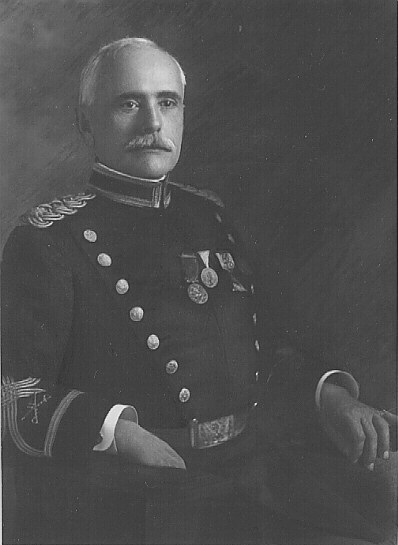
- Cabell as a lieutenant colonel with the 11th Cavalry, pictured here in 1914.
- Born: July 7, 1861; Charleston, Arkansas, United States
- Died: March 15, 1924 (aged 62); San Diego, California, United States
- Burial place: San Francisco National Cemetery, California, United States
- Spouse(s): Marie Boggs Otis (m. Feb.– Nov. 1888, her death); Martha Mary Otis (m. 1892 .– 1924, his death)
- Children: 2
- Relatives: Edouard Izac (son-in-law)
- Military career
- Allegiance: United States
- Branch: United States Army
- Service years: 1884–1919
- Rank: Major General
- Service number: 0-4453
- Unit: Cavalry Branch
- Commands: 15th Cavalry Division
- Conflicts: American Indian Wars; Spanish–American War; China Relief Expedition; Philippine–American War; Pancho Villa Expedition; World War I
- Awards: Army Distinguished Service Medal

Major General DeRosey Caroll Cabell (July 7, 1861 – March 15, 1924) was chief of staff for the Pancho Villa Expedition into Mexico in 1915–1916 and an American general during World War I.

== Early life and education ==
DeRosey Caroll Cabell was born in Charleston, Arkansas on July 7, 1861. He attended the United States Military Academy, graduating with the class of 1884. Other classmates included David C. Shanks, Samuel D. Sturgis, William L. Sibert, William Franklin Martin, Robert Houston Noble, Wilds P. Richardson, Eugene Frederick Ladd, Stephen Miller Foote, Everard Enos Hatch, Grote Hutcheson, all future general officers.

He attended the United States Army War College in 1913.

== Career ==
Cabell received a commission as a second lieutenant for the 8th Cavalry on June 15, 1884. During his frontier duty, he participated in the Geronimo campaign and was wounded.

Later, he participated in the Great Sioux War of 1890 and 1891 and the China Relief Expedition of 1900. He served in the Philippines from 1900 to 1902.

He advanced through grades and was promoted to brigadier general on Dec. 17, 1917. He was promoted to major general on Oct. 1, 1918. After World War I, he returned to his regular rank of colonel.

Cabell was the commander of the Mexican Border Command until his retirement in 1919.

== Awards ==
He received the Army Distinguished Service Medal for his service during the Pancho Villa Expedition. The citation for the medal reads:

The President of the United States of America, authorized by Act of Congress, July 9, 1918, takes pleasure in presenting the Army Distinguished Service Medal to Major General DeRosey Carroll Cabell, United States Army, for exceptionally meritorious and distinguished services to the Government of the United States, in a duty of great responsibility during World War I. While in command of the Arizona District of the Southern Department, General Cabell handled the delicate border situation with firmness and sound judgment.

== Death and legacy ==
He retired to San Diego, California. He died there on March 15, 1924.

Military offices
Preceded by George Windle Read	Commanding General 15th Cavalry Division; April−May 1918	Succeeded by Post deactivated
