= Czechoslovak War Cross =

Czechoslovak War Cross may refer to:

- Czechoslovak War Cross 1918
- Czechoslovak War Cross 1939
