= Wenda =

Wenda may refer to:

== People ==
- Benny Wenda
- Mathias Wenda
- Wenda Millard
- Wenda Nel

== Fictional characters ==
- Wenda (Where's Waldo)
