= Harry Tipper =

Harry Tipper (1878-1941) was a British born engineer, businessman and writer. He emigrated to the USA and built a successful career in the automotive, advertising and other industries. He wrote several books and numerous articles on the subjects of automobiles, advertising, and labor relations at work.

== Life and career ==
Harry Tipper was born and educated in Kendal, England. He emigrated to the USA in 1903, initially to work on the Hudson & Manhattan tunnels for New York, and built a successful career in the automotive, advertising and other industries.

=== Automotive industry ===
In 1915 he became the first Texaco advertising manager. He created the first uniform hanging signs for filling stations and produced billboards, print ads and brochures. For a number of years he was manager of the trade magazine Automotive Industries, contributing several articles.

=== Advertising ===
He wrote several books on the subject of advertising and helped set up an Advertising Division within the School of Marketing at New York University in 1920 and served on its faculty for 11 years. He was president of The Advertising Club of New York from 1914-17.

=== Human Factors in Industry ===
He wrote various articles on the subject of labor relations. In 1922 he published a book called Human Factors in Industry. A Study of Group Organization. One of the chapters is titled 'Fitting the Job to the Man', which predates the use of the term in Human factors and ergonomics by several decades.

=== Death ===
Harry Tipper died on May 7, 1941. He was found dead from a heart attack at the Purdue Union Hotel in Lafayette, Indiana.

== Books ==
- Harry Tipper (1914) The New Business. Doubleday.
- Harry Tipper, Harry L. Hollingworth, George Burton Hotchkiss and Frank Alvah Parsons (1915) Advertising. Its Principles and Practice. The Roland Press Company, New York City.
- Harry Tipper, Harry L. Hollingworth, George Burton Hotchkiss and Frank Alvah Parsons (1920) The Principles of Advertising. A Text-Book. The Roland Press Company, New York City.
- Harry Tipper (1922) Human Factors in Industry. A Study of Group Organization. The Roland Press Company, New York.
- Harry Tipper and George French (1923) Advertising Campaigns. D. Van Nostrand Company, New York.
