= James B. Cress =

American Army Reserve general

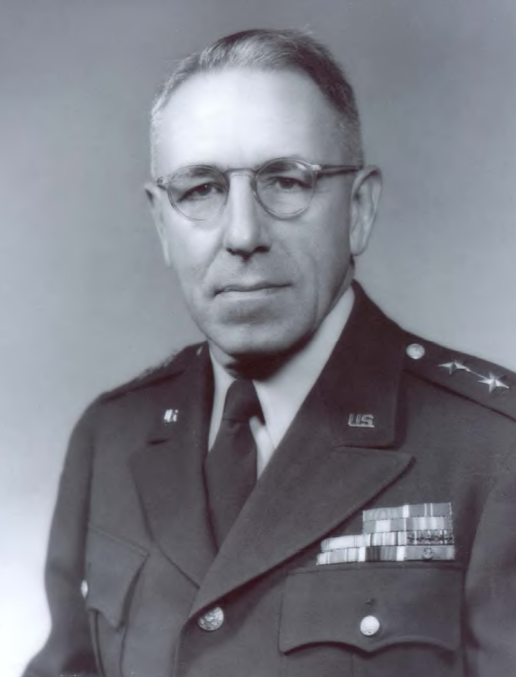
- Born: 28 December 1889; Galesburg, Illinois
- Died: 27 July 1967 (aged 77) Palo Alto, California
- Allegiance: United States
- Branch: United States Army
- Service years: 1914–1951
- Rank: Major General
- Commands: United States Army Reserve; 80th Airborne Division; 1056th Engineer Port Construction and Repair Group; 333rd Engineer Special Service Regiment
- Conflicts: World War I; World War II; Cold War
- Awards: Legion of Merit; Bronze Star Medal
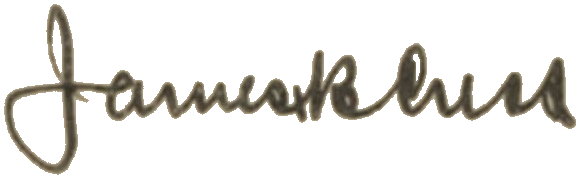
- Signature

James Bell Cress (28 December 1891 – 27 July 1967) was an engineer and United States Army Reserve major general. During World War II, he supervised the restoration of ports, canals, railroads and bridges sabotaged by the retreating German forces after the Allied Invasion of Normandy. Cress later served as the executive in charge of the Army Reserve and the Army ROTC Program.

== Early life and education ==
Cress was born in Galesburg, Illinois, the son of Army officer and 1884 United States Military Academy graduate George O. Cress. After studying engineering at the University of Michigan for three years, he entered the Military Academy at West Point in March 1910. Cress became First Captain, graduated 2nd in the Class of June 1914 and was commissioned in the Corps of Engineers. He subsequently graduated from the Army Engineer School in December 1916.

== Career ==
After commissioning, Cress served with Company F, 2nd Battalion of Engineers at Vancouver Barracks in Washington state, Company F, 1st Engineers at Fort Sam Houston in Texas and the 18th Engineer Railway Regiment in California. In May 1917, Cress was promoted to captain and sent to Camp Lewis in Washington state. In August 1917, he received a temporary promotion to major and served in France until August 1918. While there, he participated in making port and rail improvements at Bordeaux.

In August 1918, Cress received a temporary promotion to lieutenant colonel and served as an assistant to the Chief of Engineers in Washington, D.C. until October 1919. In November 1919, he became an assistant to the District Engineer in Detroit, Michigan. Returned to his permanent rank of captain in December 1919, Cress resigned his Regular Army commission in March 1920.

After accepting a position with the Dodge Brothers Company, Cress was commissioned as a lieutenant colonel in the Engineer Section, Officers Reserve Corps in May 1920. He was subsequently promoted to colonel in June 1923. Cress later moved from Birmingham, Michigan to the San Francisco area, where he served as district director for the U.S. Civil Service Commission and then as Regional Director for the U.S. Railroad Retirement Board. In March 1941, he was recalled to active duty in the Army Corps of Engineers.

Cress served as executive officer to the Engineer, Fourth Army until October 1941 and then as Engineer, IX Corps until April 1942. He was then assigned to organize, train and command the 333rd Engineer Special Service Regiment. After training, his new regiment embarked for England aboard USAT James Parker in October 1943. In May 1944, Cress was given command of the 1056th Engineer Port Construction and Repair Group, which included the 333rd Engineer Regiment. From June to November 1944, he was in charge of repairs to the port of Cherbourg. Cargo deliveries were able to commence by mid-July and full operation was restored in October. The 1056th Engineer Group then cleared the Albert Canal in Belgium, restoring barge traffic from Antwerp. Rail lines to the front were repaired, and then Cress supervised the construction of a new Wesel Railway Bridge across the Rhine River in only ten days at the beginning of April 1945.

Cress was relieved of command in September 1945 and released from active duty in December 1945. After the war, he became a Deputy Administrator of the Veterans Administration in Richmond, Virginia. In February 1947, Cress was given command of the Army Reserve 80th Airborne Division. He was promoted to brigadier general in September 1947 and major general in March 1948. In January 1950, Cress became Executive for Reserve and ROTC Affairs. After suffering a heart attack, he retired from military service on 31 January 1951.

== Personal ==
Cress married Eleanor Mary Chittenden (4 January 1892 – 29 June 1970), the daughter of his father's West Point classmate Hiram M. Chittenden, on 14 September 1916. They had two daughters.

After his 1951 retirement, Cress and his wife moved to Palo Alto, California. He died at the Palo Alto-Stanford Hospital. Cress was buried at the West Point Cemetery on 29 September 1967.
