= Frances Brackett Damon =

American poet

- Born: Frances Lewis Brackett; May 21, 1857; Dexter, Maine, U.S.
- Died: December 13, 1939 (aged 82); Dexter, Maine
- Other names: Fannie (sometimes, Fanny)
- Education: Castine Normal School
- Occupations: author; magazine editor
- Spouse: Lyman Roscoe Damon (m. 1883)
- Relatives: George Makepeace Towle
- Writing career
- Pen name: Percy Larkin
- Language: English
- Genres: songs; poetry; short stories; essays; playlets; novels

Frances Brackett Damon (née, Brackett; pen name, Percy Larkin; May 21, 1857 – December 13, 1939) was an American writer of poetry, short stories, essays, playlets, and novels. She was also an editor of the literary magazines, The Quiet Hours and The Tally Ho. She wrote many short stories for young persons, and some reform correspondence. Among her works are the poetry collection, The Bodfish Road (1901), the novel, Idlewise, the novelette, A Daughter of Pharaoh, and a long poem, "The Wind-Flower". Her songs were probably the best known of her verse, several having been used officially by the Woman's Christian Temperance Union (WCTU) and two at least having been adopted by foreign countries and sung at World WCTU conventions.

== Early life and education ==
Frances (nicknamed "Fannie" or "Fanny") Lewis Brackett was born on May 21, 1857, in a farmhouse on the outskirts of Dexter, Maine. She lived for seventeen years on a farm in that town. Her parents were Nathan Goodwin Brackett (1819-1905) and Mary Elizabeth Towle (1824-1913). (Note: Hodgkins (1926) records Damon's mother's maiden name as Roberts.) Of her parentage and ancestry she wrote:— "I can zig-zag back to a good deal of English, a little Irish, and a probable line of Scotch. My mother's parents were pioneers in Maine. They were, Joel Towle, of fine, slim build, keen intellect, high blood, Universalist belief; and Lois Roberts, robust, genial, level-headed, Quaker-trained. Father was the youngest of twelve children, a factory-boy, learning all the ins and outs of the trade, and for the greater part of his life supervising a large section. When his health failed he went to farming. The son of (maternal) Grandfather, Joel's brother, is George Makepeace Towle."

There were three older siblings: Mary Viola Brackett, Hannah Brackett, and John Russell Brackett.

At the age of fourteen, she became deeply interested in theology, and absorbed Williamson's The Will, Thomas Paine's The Age of Reason, and many other well-known books of that class, determined to settle the great problems of life. Of her religious experience, she stated:— "When I was fourteen, on a certain day, all alone in my little room upstairs, I must believe, I gave my heart to Christ, and he drew instantly near to me. In a moment the Bible, which had hitherto been the dullest of dry books, opened up to me inconceivable splendors." Her taste in literature was correspondingly improved and reformed, so that from "dribbling story papers" she turned to "the sternest truths."

Eventually, she became fond of poets. John Greenleaf Whittier was her first favorite, and later, Alfred, Lord Tennyson, Elizabeth Barrett Browning, Henry Wadsworth Longfellow, William Wordsworth, Lord Byron, Percy Bysshe Shelley, Edgar Allan Poe, and Robert Burns.

She received her education at Dexter High School and Eastern State Normal School, graduating in 1880.

== Career ==
It was said that Damon wrote verse nearly every week since 1880, though she destroyed many of her poems. After graduation and before marriage, she also taught school.

Under the pen name of "Percy Larkin", she was a constant contributor of verse to such publications as the Portland, Maine Transcript, The Youth's Companion, Morning Star, The Union Signal, religious press, and various newspapers of Maine. There was a peculiarity about her verse-form in the cases of two of her best poems: matching first lines. Her longest poem was "The Wind Flower". She wrote prose in the form of sketches, essays, and editorials, including on the topic of pedagogy.

She was the author of several novels, one of which was entitled, Idlewise. Damon was associated with her sister, Mary V. Pierce, in the editorship of Quiet Hours, a monthly journal of Literary, Educational and Social Progress (1887-1889), printed in Dexter, and The Tally Ho (1896-1899).

Damon was an active club woman, involved in the WCTU and in the suffrage movement. She was also active in prison and jail work, serving as a trustee of the Maine State Reformatory for Women, a cottage being named in her honor.

== Personal life ==
On December 1, 1883, she married Lyman Roscoe Damon (1855-1948); he had been in the same class at school. Their first year of married life was spent on her husband's farm in Dixmont, Maine. Subsequently, they removed to the Dexter home. Damon was not a member of any religious organization. As she explained it:— "I cannot be one with any denomination in the world, not because I see so many flaws, but, in truth, because I see so many virtues, in them all. I have my creed; I am content."

After a long illness, Frances Brackett Damon died at her home in Dexter, December 13, 1939.

== Selected works ==
=== Poetry ===
- The Bodfish Road (1901)
- "The Wind-Flower"

=== Novels ===
- Idlewise
- A Daughter of Pharaoh
