= Czechoslovak War Cross 1918 =

Czechoslovak War Cross 1918 Československý válečný kříž 1918 Československý vojnový kríž 1918
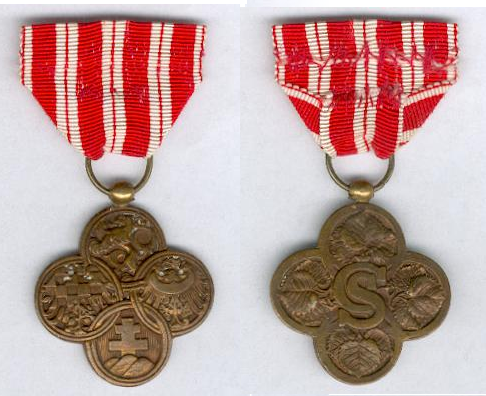
- The medal's obverse (left) and reverse (right).
- Type: Chest order
- Awarded for: Awarded to all military personnel who had served in the Czechoslovak armed forces (e.g., Czechoslovak Legions) during the years of World War I and during border conflicts with Poland and Hungary with distinction and bravery.
- Presented by: Czechoslovakia
- Eligibility: Military personnel
- Campaigns: World War I and interwar era
- Established: November 7, 1918
- Czechoslovak War Cross 1918 ribbon

The Czechoslovak War Cross 1918 (Československý válečný kříž 1918 in Czech, Československý vojnový kríž 1918 in Slovak) is a military decoration of the former state of Czechoslovakia which was issued for acts of military valour during the years of the First World War.

== Description ==
The medal was first created on November 7, 1918, and issued to Czechoslovak citizens and also, upon application, to citizens of Germany and Austria who had served in the Czechoslovak armed forces ( e.g. Czechoslovak Legions) during the years of the Great War with distinction and bravery, and also during border conflicts with Poland and Hungary.

The Czechoslovak War Cross was also, on occasion, issued to veterans of the Allied powers who had played a large role in World War I and were considered contributors to the formation of the Czechoslovak state. John J. Pershing was one such recipient of the Czechoslovak War Cross. Brigadier General Henry Delp Styer received the award to recognize his efforts while leading US troops alongside Czechoslovak allies during the 1918–1919 North Russia intervention.

It was also awarded to the capital city of Serbia, Belgrade, on October 8, 1925.

== Design ==
The medal was die-struck and high in detail, with a bronze finish. On the obverse of the cross was the symbols of the lands in circles – the symbol of the Bohemia above, Slovakia below, Moravia left and Silesia to the right. On the reverse the circles featured vermeil linden leaves, with the letters "ČS" (Československo, meaning Czechoslovakia) in the middle. The medal was suspended from a white ribbon with red stripes.

== See also ==
- Czechoslovak War Cross 1939–1945
