= Wenda Harris Millard =

American businesswoman

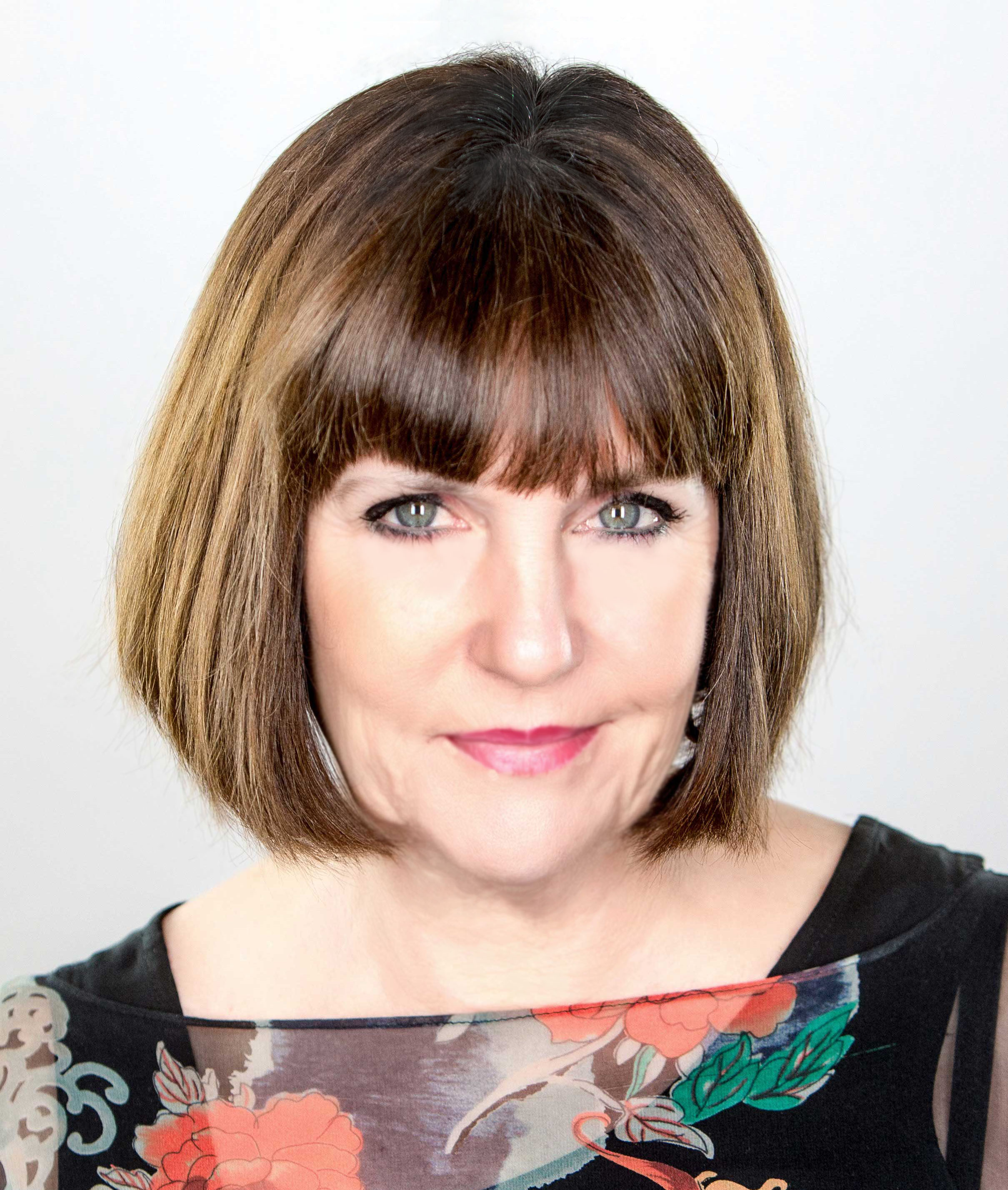
- Education: Harvard University
- Alma mater: Trinity College
- Occupations: Vice Chairman, MediaLink

Wenda Harris Millard is a media executive currently serving as vice chairman at MediaLink. Millard has held positions in media and technology as co-CEO of Martha Stewart Living Omnimedia and Chief Sales Officer at Yahoo!. In 2009, Millard joined as MediaLink President and COO, a strategic advisory firm founded by Michael Kassan.

== Early career ==
A graduate of Harvard Business School and Trinity College, Millard began her career in magazine publishing. She has served as President and Group Publisher of SRDS, senior vice president and publisher of Family Circle and executive vice president and group publisher of Adweek, Mediaweek, and Brandweek magazines.

After 20 years in traditional media, Millard entered the digital field in 1996 when she became a founding member of the executive team at DoubleClick. As Executive Vice President, Millard was responsible for establishing the DoubleClick brand and overseeing the operations of DoubleClick Media. By the time Millard left DoubleClick five years after joining, DoubleClick had become a 3,200-person company clearing $500 million in revenue. After DoubleClick, Millard was Chief Internet Officer at Ziff Davis Media and President of Ziff Davis Internet.

After Ziff Davis, Millard joined Yahoo! in 2001 as Chief Sales Officer.

After seven years at Yahoo!, Millard joined Martha Stewart Living Omnimedia in July 2007 as co-CEO and president, Media. Millard oversaw MSLO’s media businesses, which include publishing, internet and broadcast and created cross-platform programs for marketers in TV, digital, magazines and radio.

== MediaLink ==
In April 2009, Millard became president and COO of MediaLink, a strategic advisory firm to a variety of clients in media, marketing, technology, and entertainment. Millard and her business partner Michael Kassan together provide consulting, connections, and executive-search services.

== Thought leadership ==
Millard is a frequent keynote speaker and moderator. Millard has moderated panels on topics such as: programmatic buying, publisher reinvention, digital media supply chain corruption, the loss of serendipity, and growth management. Millard is frequently featured and quoted by publications such as: The New York Times, The Wall Street Journal, CBS News, Forbes, Ad Age, AdWeek, AdExchanger, and Econsultancy.

== Awards ==
Millard has received industry awards including being named a recipient of AWNY’s Impact Award in 2014; a 2014 Honoree at the Winter Wish Gala by The Partnership for Drug-Free Kids; one of Advertising Age’s "100 Most Influential Women in Advertising in the Last 100 Years" in 2012; the 2011 Oracle Award from Springboard; the 2009 ad:tech Lifetime Achievement Award; the 2007 John A. Reisenbach Award for Distinguished Citizenship); the 2006 "Advertising Person of the Year" Silver Medal Award from the AAF and the 2005 Matrix Award for "Women Who Change the World". Advertising Age also acknowledged her as a "Digital Media Master" — one of the 20 most influential executives in interactive media.

On April 26, 2022, Millard will be inducted to the American Advertising Federation's Advertising Hall of Fame and will also be presented with the David Bell Award for Industry Service.

== Associations ==
Millard is past chairman of the Interactive Advertising Bureau and former president of the Advertising Club of New York. She has served on the boards of the Advertising Council, the American Advertising Federation, the Advertising Education Foundation and others. Currently, she serves on the boards of Verifone Inc., Millennial Media and Simulmedia. She also sits on the board of the James Beard Foundation and has served two terms as a trustee of Trinity College in Hartford.
