= Michael Kassan =

American digital media expert

Michael E. Kassan (born December 11, 1950) is a digital media expert, entrepreneur, commentator, and adviser to media companies.

== Early life and education ==
Kassan was born in Brooklyn, New York in 1950. In 1953, he relocated with his family to California, where he was subsequently raised.

After receiving his BA from the University of California, Los Angeles, JD from Southwestern Law School and LLM-Taxation from New York University, Kassan began his career as a tax lawyer in the entertainment industry. He served as an entertainment lawyer for more than 10 years.

== Career ==
After other entrepreneurial ventures, Kassan become the largest franchisee of El Pollo Loco and Rally’s Hamburgers in Southern California, Northern California, and Nevada.

In 1986, Kassan entered the entertainment business as the President and COO of International Video Entertainment, a home video company which now comprises a large portion of Lionsgate.

Kassan was named President, COO, and Vice-Chairman of Initiative Media Worldwide in 1994. During his tenure, Kassan oversaw strategic management of diversified portfolios and helped grow media billings from $1.5 billion to over $10 billion.

=== MediaLink ===
Kassan founded MediaLink in 2003 as advertising, marketing, content, sales, service and commerce become more closely linked through technology. In 2017, Ascential plc acquired MediaLink in a deal valued at up to $207 million, expanding the company’s purview to a global stage. It has over 125 operators working out of offices in New York City, Los Angeles, Chicago and London. The company now offers agency reviews, executive search, talent advisory, data and technology solutions, corporate and brand transformation, trade marketing and financial due diligence. In 2021, MediaLink was acquired by United Talent Agency, bringing together MediaLink’s strategic advisory services with one of the world’s largest talent agencies. Kassan and UTA parted ways in March of 2024.

=== Media contributions ===
Kassan has served as the host of the podcast, “Good Company with Michael Kassan.” The show is produced by Kassan and the iHeartRadio Podcast Networks, and is distributed via the iHeartRadio App, Apple’s podcasts app and multiple other outlets.

Kassan has also appeared as a keynote speaker, moderator, and blogger. He has contributed as an industry expert in publications such as Forbes, The Wall Street Journal, Ad Week, Ad Age, The New York Times, and the Los Angeles Times.

He was a special advisor to Buddy Media through its ultimate acquisition by Salesforce.com. In addition he has been a special advisor and/or investor for media and technology startups, including Vidmob, Boostr, Mass Appeal, Wonderly and Encatos.

== Awards and recognition ==
Three years later, he was named one of the top media executives in America by Advertising Age Magazine.

In 2019, Kassan was inducted into the American Advertising Federation’s Hall of Fame, which is considered the highest honor in advertising. In 2018, he was honored on Adweek’s “Power 100” list and on Variety’s index of the 500 most influential business leaders shaping the global entertainment industry. Kassan has also been named to The Hollywood Reporter’s “Silicon Beach 25” list of the most powerful digital players in L.A.

== Board memberships and philanthropic work ==
Kassan serves as Chair of the UJA-New York Marketing Communications Committee, Co-Chair of the Advertising Hall of Achievement, on the Board of the National Association of Television Program Executives, the Global Advisory Board of the Wharton Future of Advertising Program, and a Director on the Board of the Ad Council.

Kassan sits on the board of the San Diego Zoo and previously served as Chairman of the California State Senate Select Committee on the Entertainment Industry. He has supported the H.E.L.P. Group, a non-profit organization serving children with special needs, and the Big Brothers Big Sisters program of Los Angeles.

== Personal life ==
Kassan has been married to his wife, Ronnie, for more than 50 years.
