= Eastern State Normal School =

- Type: Public College
- Active: 1867; 159 years ago – 1942 (84 years ago)
- Location: Castine, Maine; 44°23′22.55″N 68°48′12.76″W

The Eastern State Normal School was a college located in Castine, Maine. It operated between 1867 and 1942. During its last year, it shared its buildings with the Maine Maritime Academy, which ended up taking over its space once the school closed

== Notable people ==
- Frances Lewis Brackett Damon (1857–1939), graduated 1880; American poet, writer
- Effie Hinckley Ober, founder & manager of the Boston Ideal Opera Company
- George A. Phillips, medical doctor and Maine state legislator
