= George A. Phillips =

American politician (1853–1921)

Dr. George A. Phillips (1853-October 9, 1921) was an American physician and politician from Maine. Phillips, a Republican served one term in the Maine House of Representatives. While in office, he authored a law which prohibited people with syphilis from getting married without a certificate from a physician.

Born in Orland, Maine, Phillips graduated from Castine Normal School. He then earned an M.D. from the University of the City of New York in 1882. He was a United States Pension Examiner, served on the Bar Harbor, Maine School Board and as president of the Bar Harbor Board of Trade.
