= Lewis gun =

Light machine gun

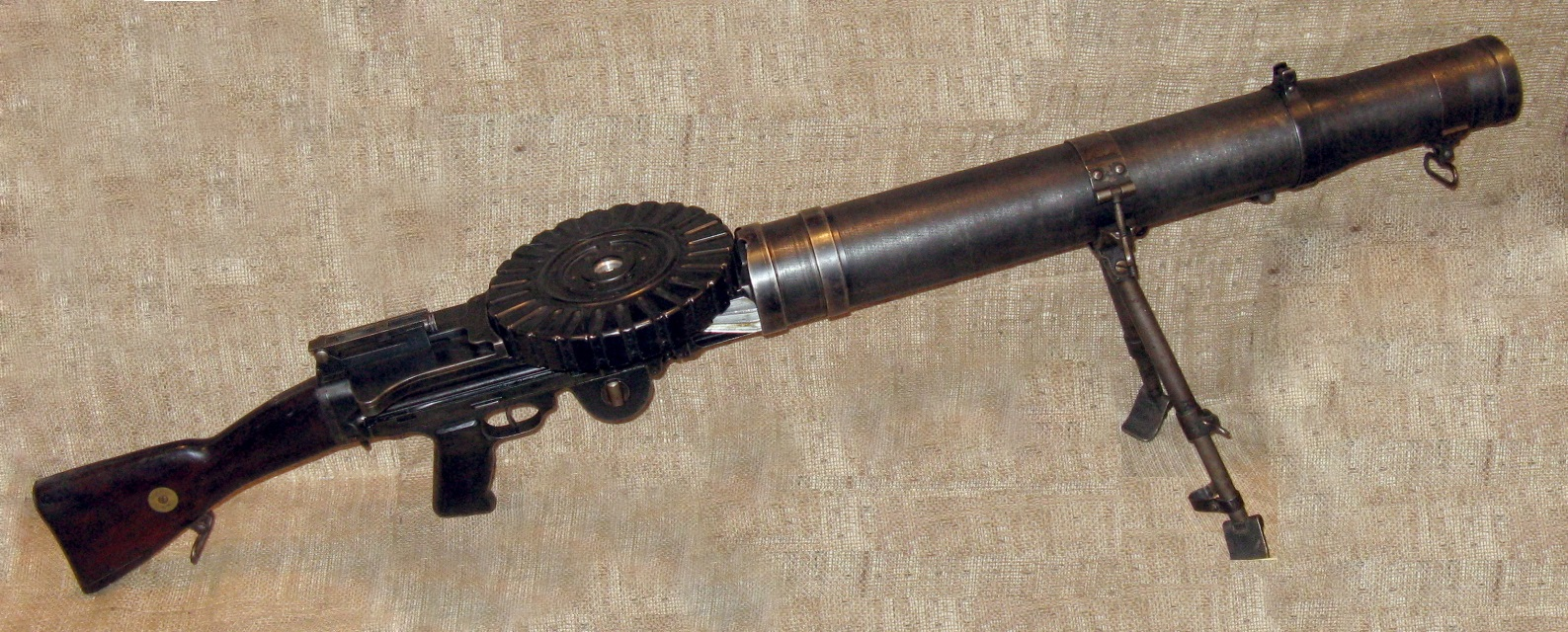
- Type: Light machine gun
- Place of origin: United States (design); United Kingdom

Service history
- In service: 1914–1953
- Used by: See § Users
- Wars: List of conflicts: World War I; Easter Rising; Pancho Villa Expedition; Banana Wars; Finnish Civil War; Irish War of Independence; Irish Civil War; Russian Civil War; Estonian War of Independence; Latvian War of Independence; Polish–Soviet War; Emu War; Chaco War; Spanish Civil War; 2^{nd} Sino-Japanese War; World War II; Indonesian National Revolution; Malayan Emergency; 1948 Arab–Israeli War; Korean War; Vietnam War; Algerian War; Dominican Civil War; Nigerian Civil War; The Troubles

Production history
- Designer: Samuel McClean; Isaac Newton Lewis
- Designed: 1911
- Manufacturer: Birmingham Small Arms Co. Ltd.; Savage Arms Co.; Soley Arms Co.
- Unit cost: £62 in 1918
- Produced: 1913–1942
- No. built: 152,050 in World War II; 50,000 chambered in .30-06
- Variants: See § Variants

Specifications
- Mass: 28 lb (13 kg)
- Length: 50.5 in (1,283 mm)
- Barrel length: 26.5 in (673 mm)
- Width: 4.5 in (114 mm)
- Cartridge: 6.5×53.5mmR (.256); 7.7×56mmR (.303); 7.62×54mmR; 7.62×63mm (.30-06); 7.92×57mm; 7.65x53mm Argentine
- Action: Gas-operated long stroke gas piston, rotating open bolt
- Rate of fire: 500–600 rounds/min
- Muzzle velocity: 2,440 ft/s (744 m/s)
- Effective firing range: 880 yd (805 m)
- Maximum firing range: 3,500 yd (3,200 m)
- Feed system: 47- or 97-round pan magazine
- Sights: Blade and tangent leaf

The Lewis gun (or Lewis automatic machine gun or Lewis automatic rifle) is a First World War–era light machine gun. Designed privately in the United States though not heavily adopted there, the design was finalised and mass-produced in the United Kingdom, and widely used by troops of the British Empire during the war. It had a distinctive barrel cooling shroud (containing a finned breech-to-muzzle aluminium heat sink to cool the gun barrel), and top-mounted pan magazine. The Lewis served until the end of the Korean War, and was widely used as an aircraft machine gun during both World Wars, almost always with the cooling shroud removed, as air flow during flight provided sufficient cooling.

== History ==
A predecessor to the Lewis gun incorporating the principles upon which it was based was designed by Ferdinand Mannlicher. The Lewis gun was invented by U.S. Army colonel Isaac Newton Lewis in 1911, based on initial work by Samuel Maclean. Despite its origins, the Lewis gun was not initially adopted by the U.S. military, most likely because of political differences between Lewis and General William Crozier, the chief of the Ordnance Department. Lewis became frustrated with trying to persuade the U.S. Army to adopt his design, claiming that he was "slapped by rejections from ignorant hacks", and retired from the army.

Lewis left the United States in 1913 and went to Belgium, where he established the Armes Automatique Lewis company in Liège to facilitate commercial production of the gun. Lewis had been working closely with a British arms manufacturer, the Birmingham Small Arms Company Limited (BSA), in an effort to overcome some of the production difficulties of the weapon. The Belgians bought a small number of Lewis guns in 1913, using the .303 British round, and in 1914 BSA purchased a licence to manufacture the Lewis machine gun in England, which resulted in Lewis receiving significant royalty payments and becoming very wealthy. Lewis and his factory moved to England before 1914, away from possible seizure in the event of a German invasion.

== Production ==
The onset of the First World War increased demand for the Lewis gun, and BSA began production, under the designation "Model 1914". The design was officially approved for service on 15 October 1915 under the designation "Gun, Lewis, .303-cal." No Lewis guns were produced in Belgium during the war. All manufacture was carried out by BSA in England and the Savage Arms Company in the US, and although the two versions were largely similar, enough differences existed to stop them being completely interchangeable, although this had been rectified by the time of the Second World War.

The major difference between the two designs was that the BSA weapons were chambered for .303 British ammunition, whereas the Savage guns were chambered for .30-06 cartridges, which necessitated some difference in the magazine, feed mechanism, bolt, barrel, extractors, and gas operation system. Savage did make Lewis guns in .303 British calibre, though. The Model 1916 and Model 1917 were exported to Canada and the United Kingdom, and a few were supplied to the US military, particularly the Navy. The Savage Model 1917 was generally produced in .30-06 calibre. A number of these guns were supplied to the UK under lend-lease during the Second World War.

== Design details ==
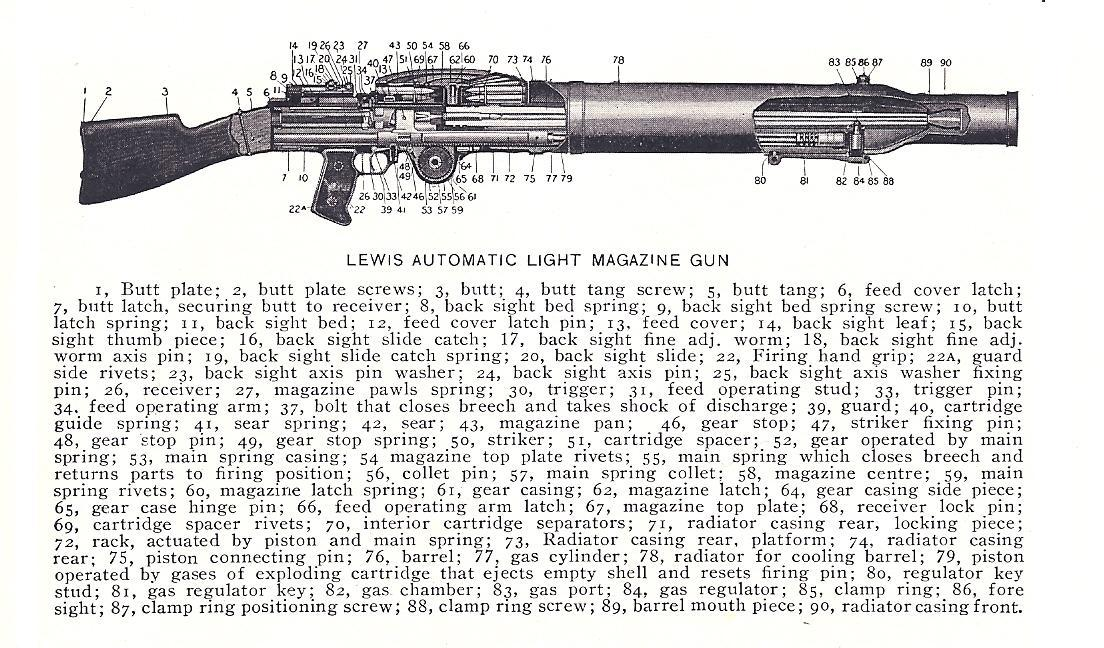
Lewis gun schematic.

The Lewis gun was gas operated using a rear-lugged rotating bolt. A portion of the expanding propellant gas was tapped off from the barrel, driving a piston to the rear against a spring. The piston was fitted with a vertical post at its rear which rode in a helical cam track in the bolt, rotating it at the end of its travel nearest the breech. This allowed the three locking lugs at the rear of the bolt to engage in recesses in the gun's body to lock it into place. The post also carried a fixed firing pin, which protruded through an aperture in the front of the bolt, firing the next round at the foremost part of the piston's travel.

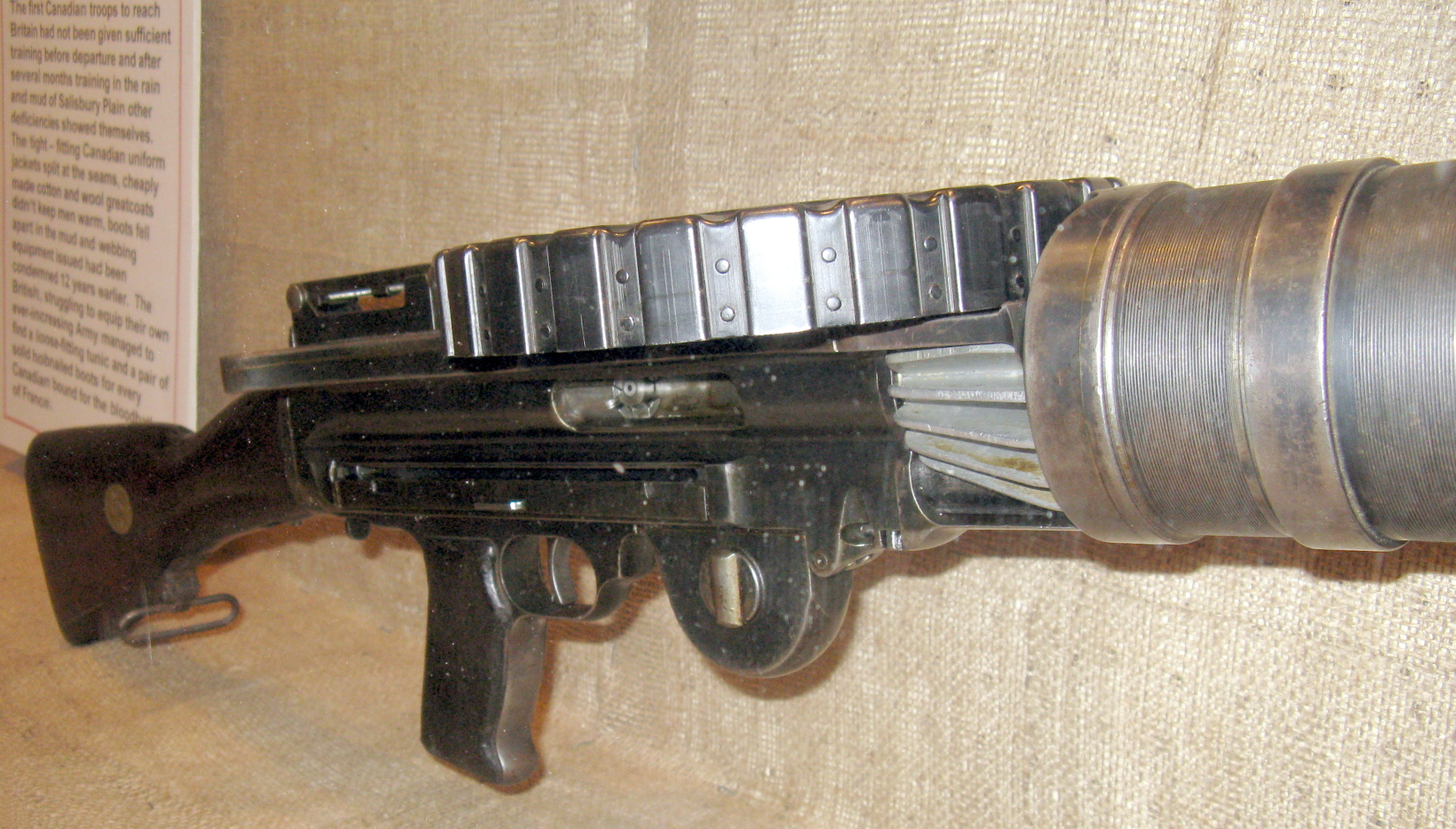
A Lewis gun at the Elgin Military Museum Canada. The rear end of its light-gray finned aluminium heat sink, which fits within the gun's brass-coloured cylindrical cooling shroud, can be seen.

The gun's aluminium barrel-shroud caused the muzzle blast to draw air over the barrel and cool it, due to the muzzle-to-breech, radially finned aluminium heat sink within the shroud's barrel, and protruding behind the shroud's aft end, running lengthwise in contact with the gun barrel (somewhat like the later American M1917/18 Marlin-Rockwell machine gun's similar gun barrel cooling design) from the "bottleneck" near the shroud's muzzle end and protruding externally behind the shroud's rear end. Some discussion occurred over whether the shroud was necessary: in the Second World War, many old aircraft guns that did not have the tubing were issued to anti-aircraft units of the British Home Guard and to British airfields, and others were used on vehicle mounts in the Western Desert; all were found to function properly without it, which led to the suggestion that Lewis had insisted on the cooling arrangement largely to show that his design was different from Maclean's earlier prototypes. Only the Royal Navy retained the tube/heatsink cooling system on their deck-mounted AA-configuration Lewis guns.

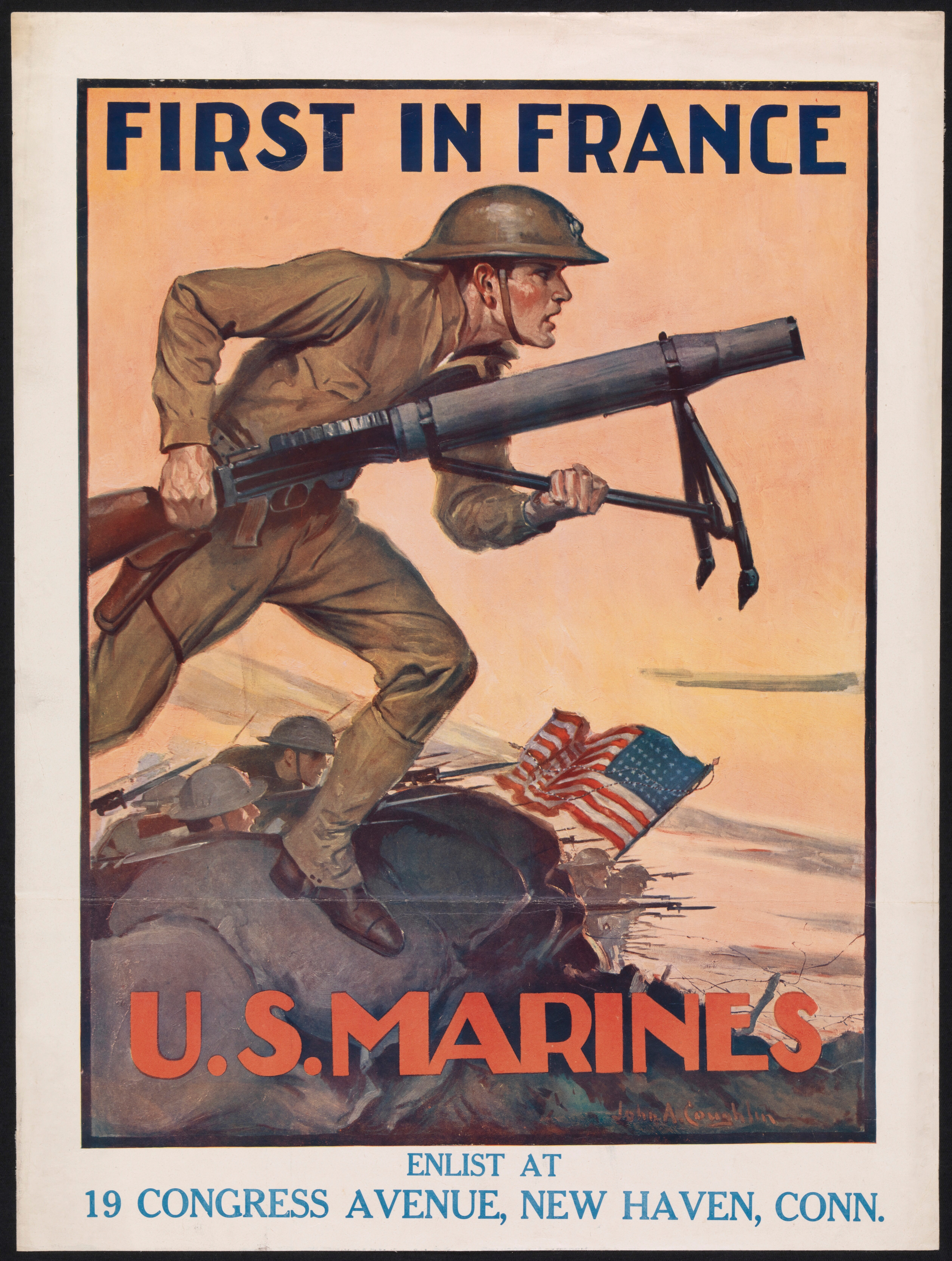
A 1917 recruiting poster for the United States Marines featuring a Lewis gun

The Lewis gun used a pan magazine holding 47 or 97 rounds. Pan magazines hold the ammunition nose-inwards toward the center, in a radial fan. Unlike the more common drum magazines, which hold the rounds parallel to the axis and are fed by spring tension, pan magazines are mechanically indexed. The Lewis magazine was driven by a cam on top of the bolt which operated a pawl mechanism via a lever.

In the First World War, Armourer Staff-Sargeant, Francis Leo Keeffe of the Royal Army Ordnance Corps, was awarded a Certificate of Merit for inventing an automatic filler for the gun's magazines.

An interesting point of the design was that it did not use a traditional helical coiled recoil spring, but used a spiral spring, much like a large clock spring, in a semicircular housing just in front of the trigger. The operating rod had a toothed underside, which engaged with a cog which wound the spring. When the gun fired, the bolt recoiled and the cog was turned, tightening the spring until the resistance of the spring had reached the recoil force of the bolt assembly. At that moment, as the gas pressure in the breech fell, the spring unwound, turning the cog, which, in turn, wound the operating rod forward for the next round. As with a clock spring, the Lewis gun recoil spring had an adjustment device to alter the recoil resistance for variations in temperature and wear. The Lewis design proved reliable and was even copied by the Japanese and used extensively by them during the Second World War.

The gun's cyclic rate of fire was about 500–600 rounds per minute. A recoil enhancer was added to the 1918 aircraft gun variant (and refitted to many 1917 models) which increased the rate of fire to about 800 rounds per minute. The ground use versions weighed 28 lb (12.7 kg), only about half as much as a typical medium machine gun of the era, such as the Vickers machine gun, and was chosen in part because, being more portable than a heavy machine gun, it could be carried and used by one soldier. BSA even produced at least one model (the "B.S.A. Light Infantry Pattern Lewis Gun", which lacked the aluminium barrel shroud and had a wooden fore grip) designed as a form of automatic rifle.

== Service ==
=== First World War ===
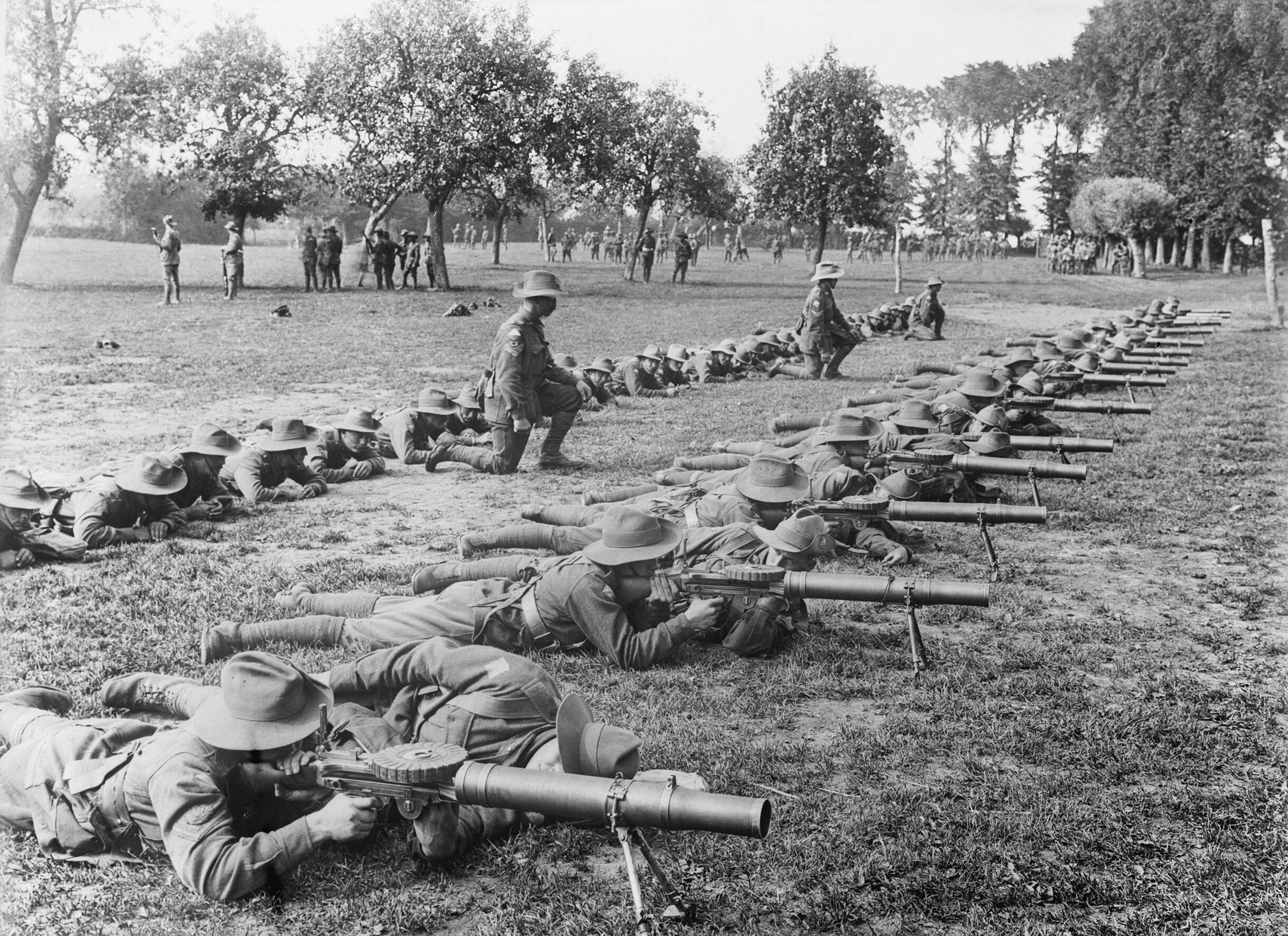
Men of the 28th Battalion of the 2nd Australian Division practising Lewis gun drill at Renescure

During the first days of the war, the Belgian Army had put in service 20 prototypes (5 in 7.65×53mm and 15 in .303) for the defense of Namur.

The United Kingdom officially adopted the Lewis gun in .303 British calibre for land and aircraft use in October 1915. The weapon began to be issued to the British Army's infantry battalions on the Western Front in early 1916 as a replacement for the heavier and less mobile Vickers machine gun, which had been withdrawn from the infantry for use by the specialist Machine Gun Corps. The US Navy and Marine Corps followed in early 1917, adopting the M1917 Lewis gun (produced by the Savage Arms Co.), in .30-06 calibre.

Notes made during his training in 1918 by Arthur Bullock, a private soldier in the 2/4th Oxfordshire and Buckinghamshire Light Infantry, record that the chief advantage of the gun was "its invulnerability" and its chief disadvantages were "its delicacy, the fact that it is useless for setting up a barrage, and also that the system of air cooling employed does not allow of more than 12 magazines being fired continuously." He records its weight as 26 lbs unloaded and 30 1/2 lbs loaded (though later he mentions that it weighed 35 lbs loaded), and that it had 47 cartridges in a fully loaded magazine; also that it was supported by a bipod in front and by the operator's shoulder at the rear. About six months into his service, Bullock was sent on Lewis gun refresher course at La Lacque, and he recalled that the rigour of the training meant that "everyone passed out 100 percent efficient, the meaning of which will be appreciated when I say that part of the final test was to strip down the gun completely and then, blindfolded, put those 104 parts together again correctly in just one minute."

Lewis Gun Manual used by Sgt. Don L. Palmer of the 25th Aero Squadron

The gun was operated by a team of seven. Bullock was the First Lewis Gunner who carried the gun and a revolver, while "The Second Gunner carried a bag containing spare parts, and the remaining five members of the team carried loaded pans of ammunition." Bullock noted, "all could fire the gun if required, and all could effect repairs in seconds." Bullock provides several vivid descriptions of the gun's use in combat. For example, on 13 April 1918 he and his fellow soldiers intercepted a German advance along the Calonne/Robecq road, noting "we fired the gun in turns until it was too hot to hold," and recording that 400 German casualties were caused, "chiefly by my Lewis gun!"

The US Army never officially adopted the weapon for infantry use and even went so far as to take Lewis guns away from US Marines arriving in France and replace them with the Chauchat LMG—a practice believed to be related to General Crozier's dislike of Lewis and his gun. The divisions of the US II Corps attached to the British Army were equipped with the gun. The US Army eventually adopted the Browning Automatic Rifle in 1917 (although it was September 1918 before any of the new guns reached the front). The US Navy and Marine Corps continued to use the .30-06 calibre Lewis until the early part of the Second World War.

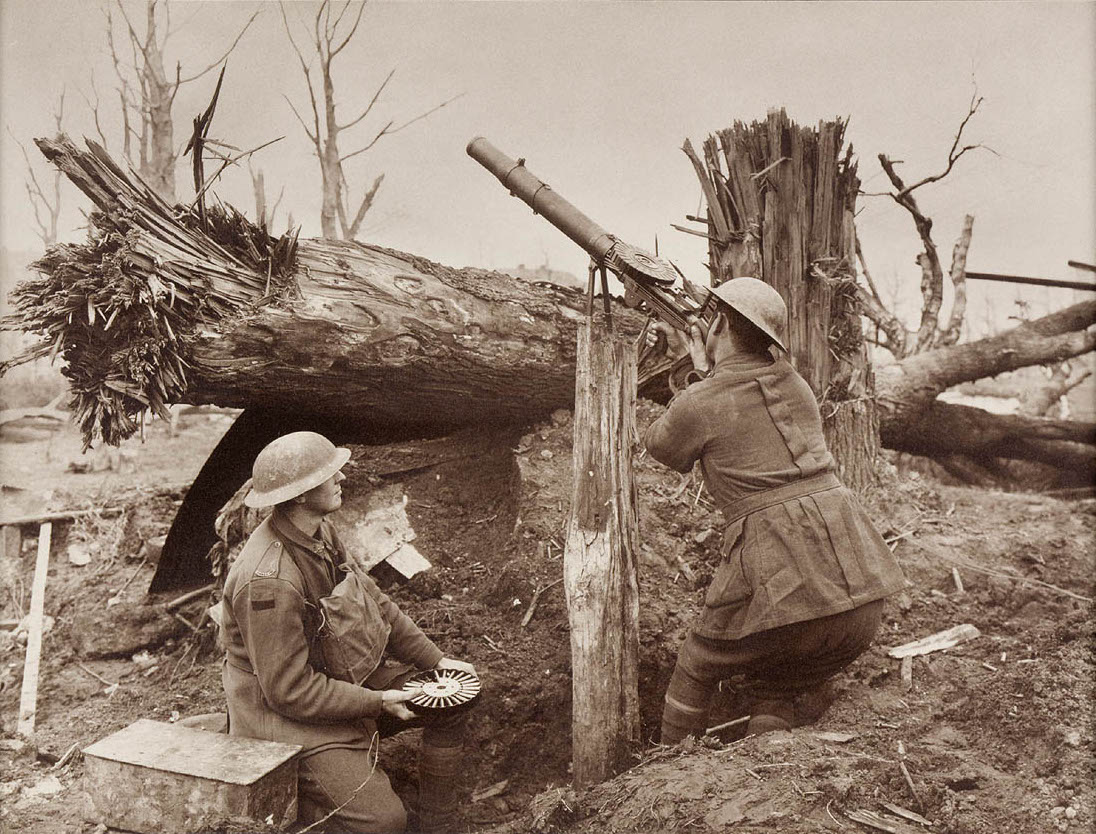
Australian soldiers firing at enemy aircraft during the First World War

The Russian Empire purchased 10,000 Lewis guns in 1917 from the British government, and ordered another 10,000 weapons from Savage Arms in the US. The US government was unwilling to supply the Tsarist Russian government with the guns and some doubt exists as to whether they were actually delivered, although records indicate that 5,982 Savage weapons were delivered to Russia by 31 March 1917. The Lewis guns supplied by Britain were dispatched to Russia in May 1917, but it is not known for certain whether these were the Savage-made weapons being trans-shipped through the UK, or a separate batch of UK-produced units. White armies in Northwest Russia received several hundred Lewis guns in 1918–1919.

British Mark IV tanks used the Lewis, replacing the Vickers and Hotchkiss used in earlier tanks. The Lewis was chosen for its relatively compact magazines, but the ventilation system inside the tank caused the airflow to be reversed through the Lewis cooling jacket, resulting in hot air and fumes being blown into the gunner's face. As soon as an improved belt feed for the Hotchkiss was developed, the Lewis was replaced by them in later tank models.

This gif shows how the Lewis Gun fired its rounds when in combat.

As their enemies used the mobility of the gun to ambush German raiding parties, the Germans nicknamed the Lewis "the Belgian Rattlesnake". They used captured Lewis guns in both World Wars, and included instruction in its operation and care as part of their machine-gun crew training.

Despite costing more than a Vickers gun to manufacture (the cost of a Lewis gun was £165 in 1915 and £175 in 1918; the Vickers cost about £100), Lewis machine guns were in high demand with the British military during the First World War. The Lewis also had the advantage of being about 80% faster to build than the Vickers, and was a lot more portable. Accordingly, the British government placed orders for 3,052 guns between August 1914 and June 1915. Lewis guns outnumbered the Vickers by a ratio of about 3:1.

==== Aircraft use ====
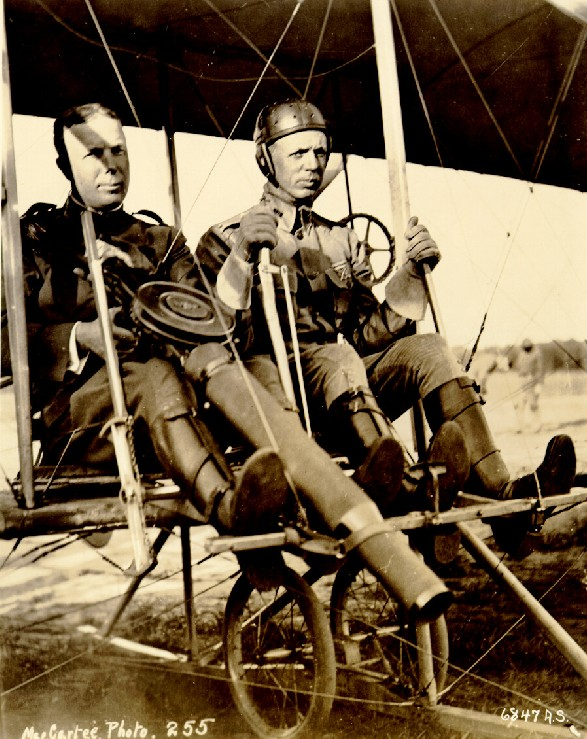
Captain Charles Chandler (with prototype Lewis Gun) and Lt Roy Kirtland in a Wright Model B Flyer after the first successful firing of a machine gun from an aeroplane in June 1912

The Lewis gun was the first machine gun fired from an aeroplane; on 7 June 1912, Captain Charles Chandler of the US Army fired a prototype Lewis gun from the foot-bar of a Wright Model B Flyer.

Lewis guns were used extensively on British and French aircraft during the First World War, as either an observer's or gunner's weapon or an additional weapon to the more common Vickers. The Lewis's popularity as an aircraft machine gun was partly due to its low weight, the fact that it was air-cooled and that it used self-contained 97-round drum magazines. Because of this, the Lewis was first mounted on the Vickers F.B.5 "Gunbus", which was probably the world's first purpose-built combat aircraft when it entered service in August 1914, replacing the Vickers machine gun used on earlier experimental versions. It was also fitted on two early production examples of the Bristol Scout C aircraft by Lanoe Hawker in mid-1915, mounted on the port side and firing forwards and outwards at a 30° angle to avoid the propeller arc.

The problem in mounting a Lewis to fire forward in most single-engined tractor configuration fighters was due to the open bolt firing cycle of the Lewis, which prevented it from being synchronized to fire directly forward through the propeller arc of such aircraft; only the unusual French SPAD S.A "pulpit plane" which possessed a unique hinged gunner's nacelle immediately ahead of the propeller (and the pilot), and the British pusher fighters Vickers F.B.5, Airco D.H.2, Royal Aircraft Factory F.E.2 and F.E.8 could readily use the Lewis as direct forward-firing armament early in the war. Some British single-engined tractor configuration fighters used a Foster mounting on the top wing to elevate a Lewis gun above the propeller arc for unsynchronized firing, including production S.E.5/S.E.5a fighters and field-modified examples of the Avro 504. For the use of observers or rear gunners, the Lewis was mounted on a Scarff ring, which allowed the gun to be rotated and elevated whilst supporting the gun's weight.

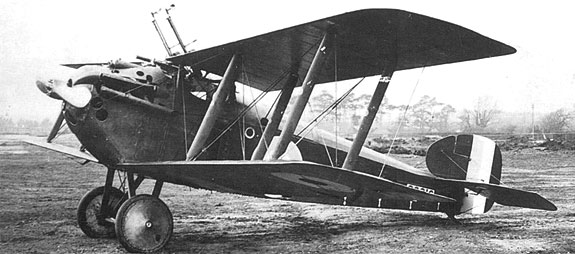
1918 Sopwith Dolphin with twin Lewis guns aimed upwards

Until September 1916 Zeppelin airships were very difficult to attack successfully at high altitude, although this also made accurate bombing impossible. Aeroplanes struggled to reach a typical altitude of 10,000 feet (3,000 m), and firing the solid bullets usually used by aircraft Lewis guns was ineffectual: they made small holes causing inconsequential gas leaks. Britain developed new bullets, the Brock containing spontaneously igniting potassium chlorate, and the Buckingham filled with pyrophoric phosphorus, to set fire to the Zeppelin's hydrogen. These had become available by September 1916. When combined with explosive Pomeroy bullets which ripped open the envelopes, they proved very successful, and Lewis guns loaded with a mixture of Pomeroy, Brock and Buckingham ammunition were often employed for balloon-busting against German Zeppelins, other airships and Drache barrage balloons.

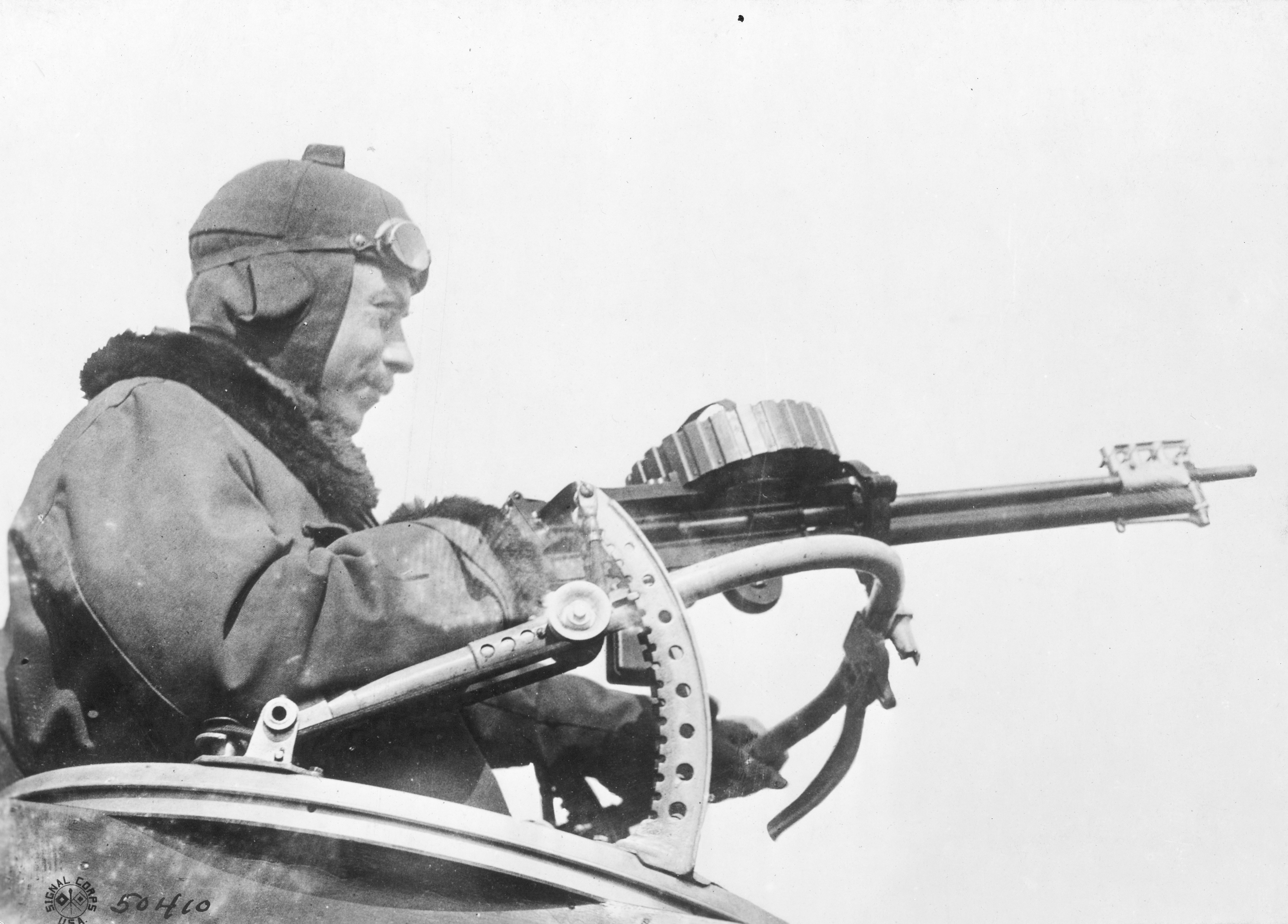
A closer view of the Lewis aircraft gun and mount

On the French Nieuport 11 and later Nieuport 17 sesquiplanes, a Lewis gun was mounted above the top wing (in a similar way as fitted to the British S.E.5a) – sometimes on a Foster mount, which allowed firing directly forward outside the propeller arc. The Foster mount usually incorporated an arc-shaped I-beam rail as its rearmost structural member, that a Lewis gun could be slid backwards and downwards along the rail towards the cockpit, to allow the ammunition drum to be changed in flight – but RFC fighter ace Albert Ball VC also understood that the Lewis gun in such a mount also retained its original trigger, and could thus be fired upwards. He used the upward firing Lewis to attack solitary German two-seater aircraft from below and behind, where the observer could not see him or fire back. It was his use of the weapon in this way, in a Nieuport, that led to its later introduction on the S.E.5/S.E.5a: Ball had acted in a consultant capacity on the development of this aeroplane. The later Sopwith Dolphin, already armed with twin synchronized Vickers guns just forward of the pilot and just above its V-8 engine, could also use one or two Lewis guns mounted on the forward crossbar of its cabane structure, between the top wing panels, as an anti-Zeppelin measure. A few of the Dolphins in use with No. 87 Squadron RAF in the summer of 1918, alternatively mounted their twin Lewises atop the lower wings just inboard of the inner wing struts for an additional pair of forward-firing machine guns; in such a field-achieved configuration, however, neither gun-jam clearing, nor drum magazine replacement were possible on their Lewises during a mission.

Lewis guns were also carried as defensive guns on British airships. The SS class blimps carried one gun. The larger NS class blimps carried two or three guns in the control car and some were fitted with an additional gun and a gunner's position at the top of the gasbag.

=== Second World War ===
By the Second World War, the British Army had replaced the Lewis gun with the Bren gun for most infantry use. As an airborne weapon, the Lewis was largely supplanted by the Vickers K, a weapon that could achieve over twice the rate of fire of the Lewis.

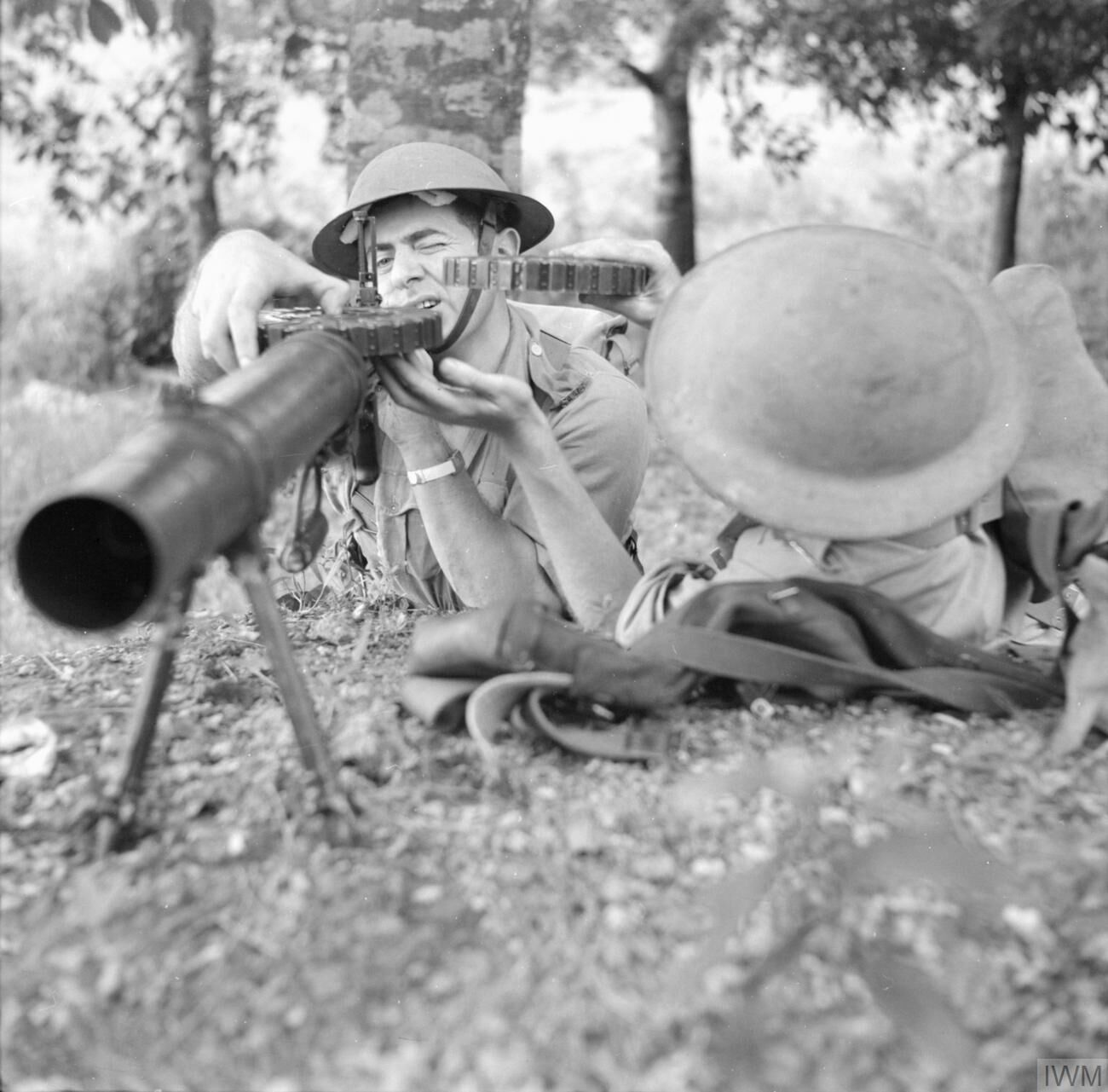
Recruits of the Singapore Volunteer Force training with a Lewis gun, 1941

In the crisis following the Fall of France, where a large part of the British Army's equipment had been lost up to and at Dunkirk, stocks of Lewis guns in both .303 and .30-06 were hurriedly pressed back into service, primarily for Home Guard, airfield defence and anti-aircraft use. 58,983 Lewis guns were taken from stores, repaired, refitted and issued by the British during the course of the war. In addition to their reserve weapon role in the UK, they also saw front-line use with the Dutch, British, Australian, and New Zealand forces in the early years of the Pacific campaign against the Japanese. The Lewis gun saw continued service as an anti-aircraft weapon during the war; in this role, it was credited by the British for bringing down more low-flying enemy aircraft than any other AA weapon. Peter White indicates that his battalion of the King's Own Scottish Borderers was still using the Lewis on Universal Carriers in 1945. Royal Naval Commandos were also designated use of the weapon for their beach parties.

At the start of the Second World War, the Lewis was the Royal Navy's standard close-range air defence weapon. It was installed on major warships, armed trawlers and defensively equipped merchant ships. It was often used in twin mountings and a quadruple mount was developed for motor torpedo boats. British submarines generally carried two guns on single mounts. Although it was gradually replaced by the Oerlikon 20 mm cannon, new corvettes were still being fitted with twin Lewises as late as 1942. Lewis guns were also carried by the Royal Air Force's air-sea rescue launches.

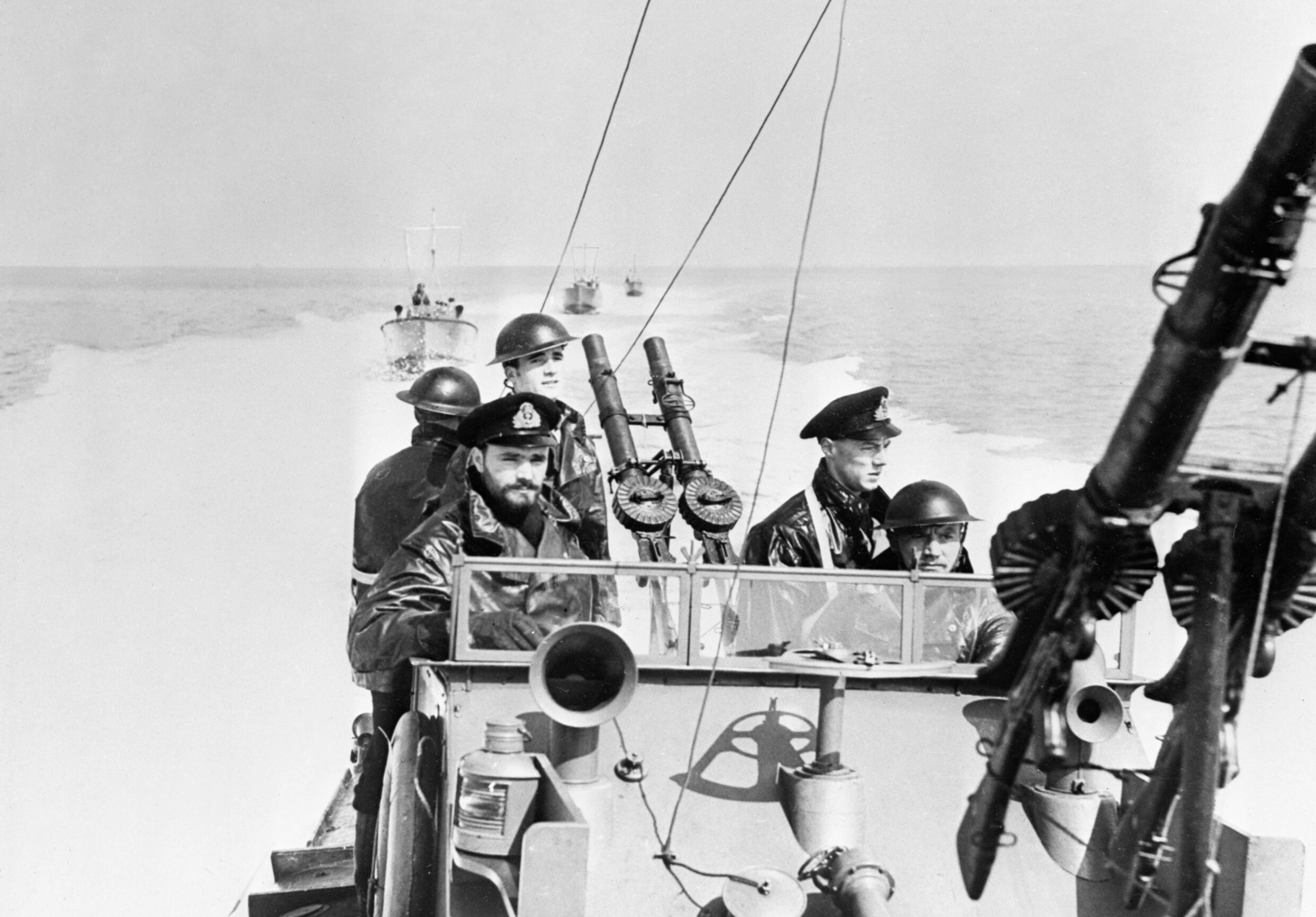
A Royal Navy Motor Torpedo Boat with two twin Lewis gun mounts, 1940

American forces used the Lewis gun (in .30-06 calibre) throughout the war. The US Navy used the weapon on armed merchant cruisers, small auxiliary ships, landing craft and submarines. The US Coast Guard also used the Lewis on their vessels. It was never officially adopted by the US Army for anything other than aircraft use.

The Germans used captured British Lewis guns during the war under the designation 7,7 mm l.MG 137(e), whilst after the German invasion of May 1940, the Dutch Lewis M.20 guns were also used by Germany under the designation 6,5 mm l.MG 100 (h). The Japanese copied the Lewis design and employed it extensively during the war; it was designated the Type 92 and chambered for a 7.7 mm rimmed cartridge that was interchangeable with the .303 British round.

The Lewis was officially withdrawn from British service in 1946, but continued to be used by forces operating against the United Nations in the Korean War. It was also used against French and US forces in the First Indochina War and the subsequent Vietnam War.

Total production of the Lewis gun during the Second World War by BSA was over 145,000 units, a total of 3,550 guns were produced by the Savage Arms Co. for US service: 2,500 in .30-06 and 1,050 in .303 British calibre.

== Variants ==
=== Canada ===
- Model 1915 — This was the designation given to .303 Lewis Mk I weapons manufactured for Canada in the United States by the Savage Arms Company. Large numbers of these guns were also produced by Savage for the British Army and in an aircraft configuration, for France and Italy.

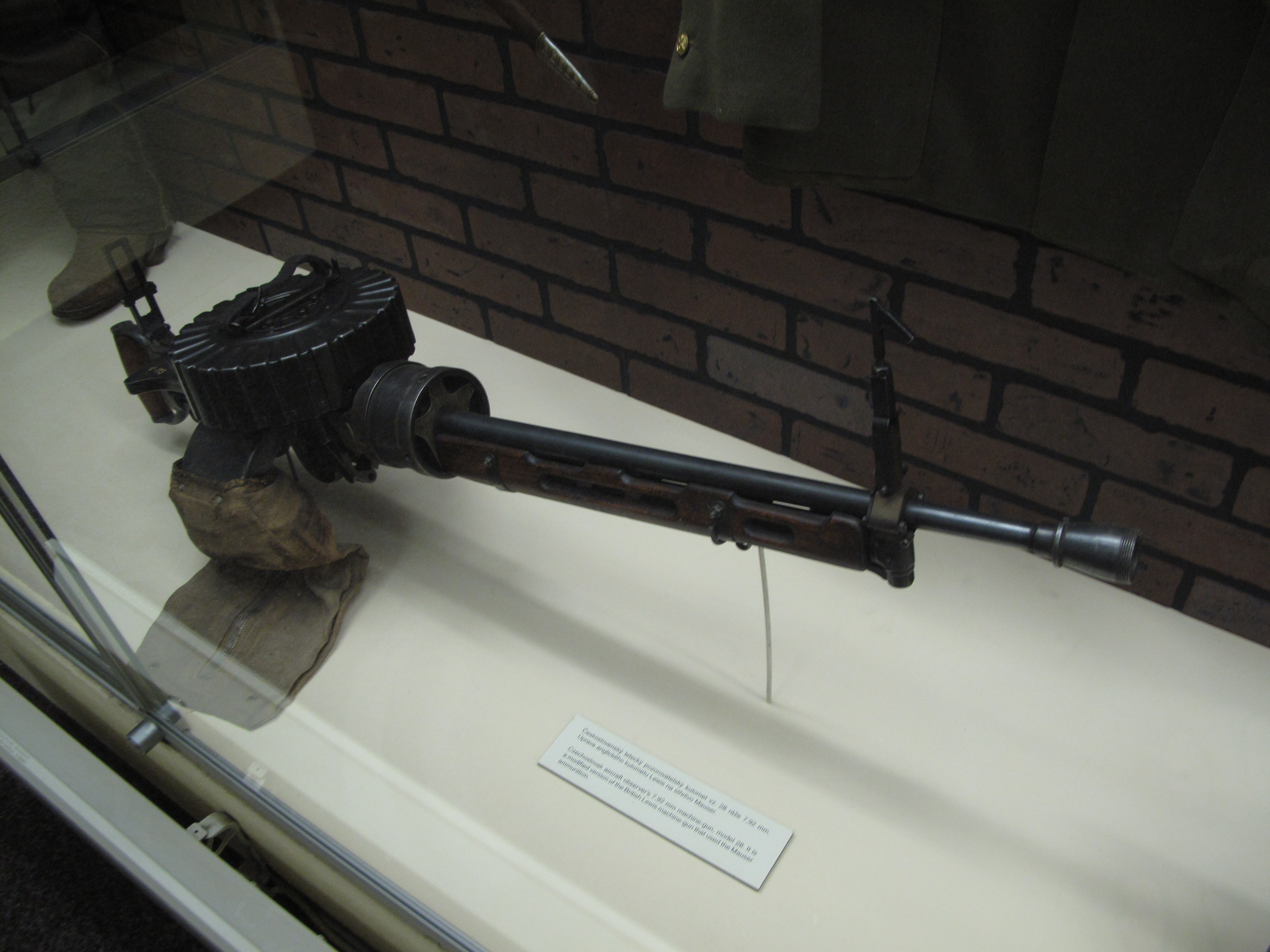
Czech Vz 28/L, chambered for the 7.92×57mm Mauser ammunition

=== Czechoslovakia ===
- Vz. 28/L — 731 Lewis guns (chambered in 7.92mm Mauser) formerly used by the Czechoslovak infantry were modified to aircraft (or anti-aircraft) machine guns by Česká zbrojovka Strakonice.

=== Netherlands ===
- Mitrailleur M.20 — In the Netherlands, the Lewis in both ground and aircraft versions was used in .256 Mannlicher, using a 97-round magazine only. The infantry version was equipped with a carrying handle on a clamp around the rear of the cooling tube. This Dutch modification of the older BSA redesign would have been extremely simple, as the Dutch/Romanian 6.5mm Mannlicher round has very nearly the same critical dimensions of the case head and rim as .303" British.

=== United Kingdom ===
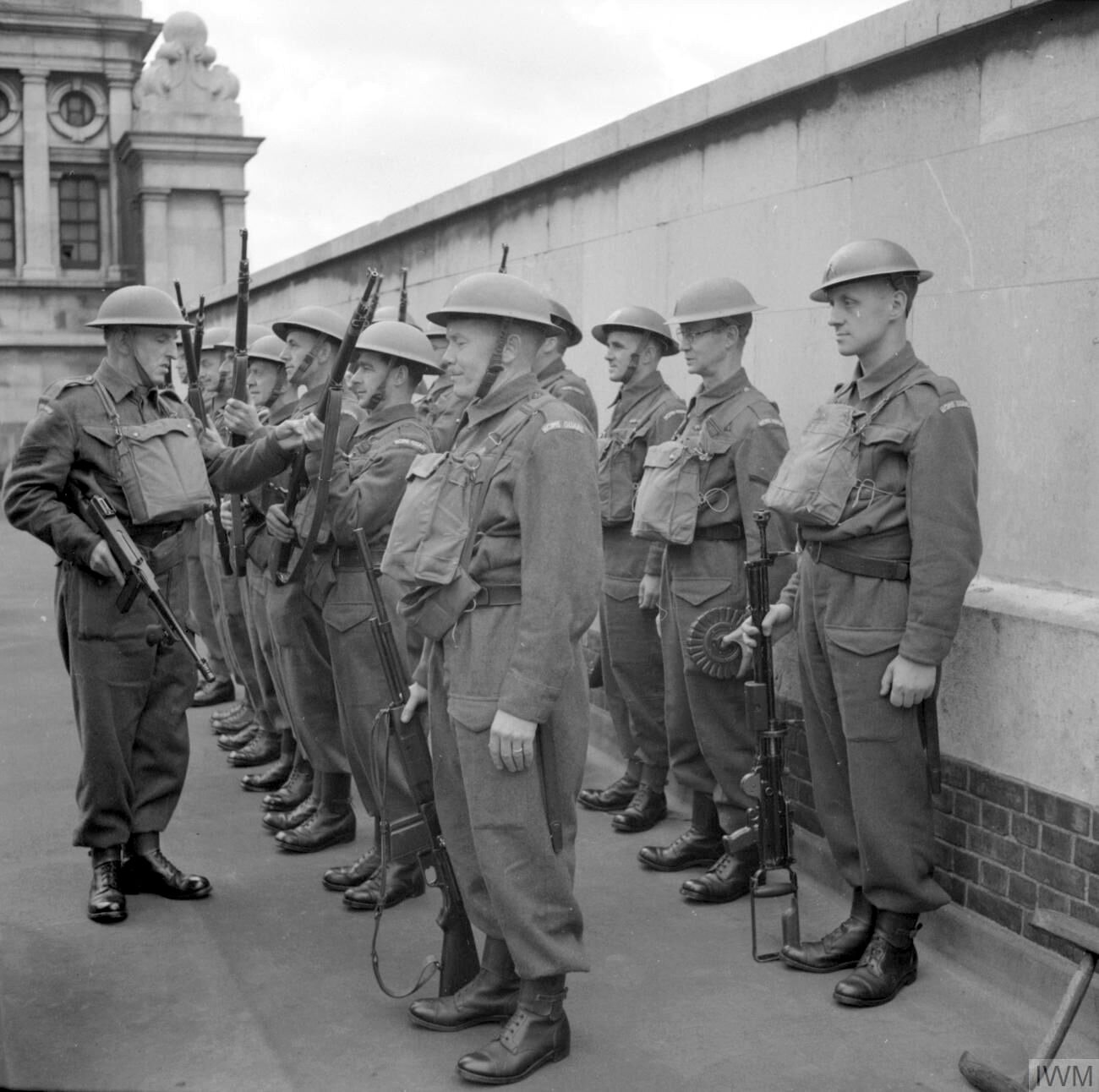
A British Home Guard platoon in 1941. The soldier on the right is carrying either a Lewis Mk III* or Mk III** with the improvised skeleton stock and fore-stock to make it usable as a ground weapon. The man next to him is carrying the drum magazine.

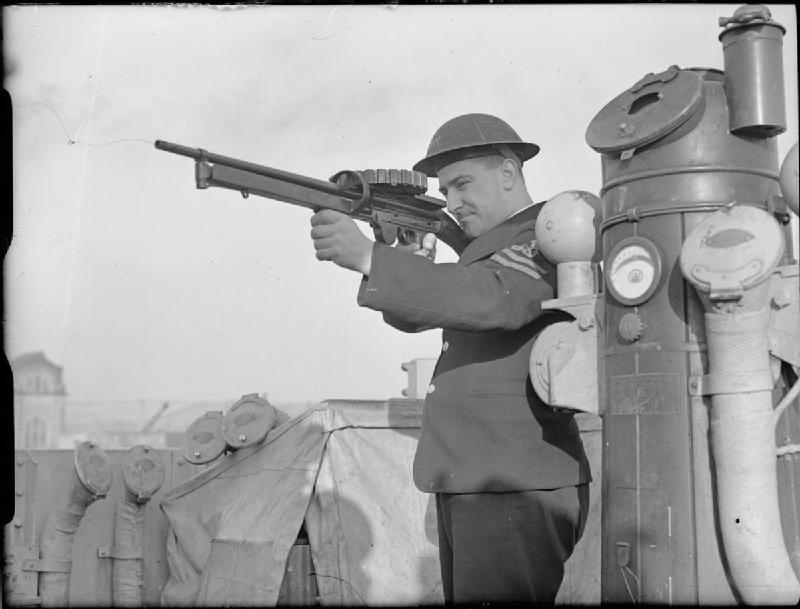
A Lewis Mark III DEMS used on defensively equipped merchant ships that used a vertical foregrip that allowed the weapon to be fired free-standing from the shoulder, from any part of a ship's decks.

- Mark I. The .303 Lewis Mk I was the basic ground pattern model used by British and British Empire forces from 1915 with few improvements.
- Mark II. This was the first purpose built aircraft version of the Lewis, earlier versions had been improvised from Mk I guns. The cooling fins were omitted to save weight, but a light protective shroud around the barrel was retained. The wooden stock was removed and replaced with a "spade" grip, which resembled the handle of a garden spade. A 97-round drum magazine was introduced which required a larger magazine spigot on the body of the gun.
- Mark II*. An improved Mk II with an increased rate of fire introduced in 1918.
- Mark III. A further upgrade of the Mk II with an even faster rate of fire and the barrel shroud removed, introduced later in 1918.
- Mark III*. The British designation for the US .30-06 M1918 aircraft gun, some 46,000 of which were imported for the use of the Home Guard in 1940. These guns were modified for ground use by the replacement of the spade grip with a crude skeleton stock and the addition of a simple wooden fore-stock which would allow the gun to be fired while resting on a sandbag, or from the hip while advancing.
- Mark III**. The designation for the .303 Mark III modified in the same way as the US M1918s.
- Mark III DEMS. Intended for defensively equipped merchant ships (DEMS), it was similar to the Mk III** but with the addition of a pistol grip on the fore-stock, so that the weapon could be fired free-standing from the shoulder, from any part of a ship's decks.
- Mark IV. After all the usable weapons had been reconditioned and issued, there remained a large number of incomplete Lewis guns and spare parts. These were assembled into guns similar to the Mk III**. There was a particular shortage of the fragile "clock" springs for the Lewis, so a simpler spring was manufactured and housed in a straight tube which extended into the skeleton stock. Many of these guns were fitted with a simple and light tripod which had been specially produced.

=== United States ===
- M1917 Lewis — Savage produced a version of the Lewis Mk I for US forces, rechambered for the .30-06 round and with a modified gas operation due to the greater power of the US ammunition. A few of these were modified for aircraft use, when intended for non-synchronized emplacements on an airframe. The US Navy designation was Lewis Mark VI and Mk VI Mod 1.
- M1918 Lewis — A purpose built aircraft version of the M1917.

=== Experimental projects ===
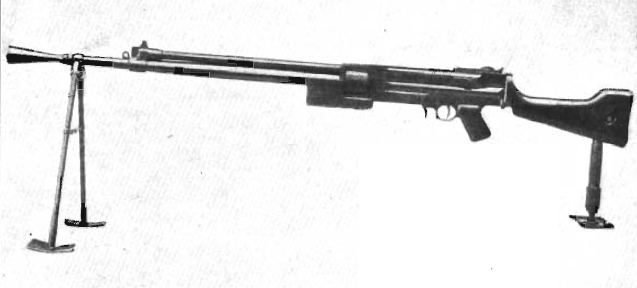
Lewis "Assault Phase" rifle

A commercial venture in 1921 by the Birmingham Small Arms Company was a version which fired the 12.7×81mm (0.5-inch Vickers) ammunition, intended for use against aircraft and tanks. At around the same time, BSA developed the Light Infantry Model which had a 22-round magazine and a wooden fore-stock in place of the radiator fins and shroud; it was intended to be used in a similar way to the Browning Automatic Rifle. Another development was a twin Lewis for aircraft use in which the bodies of the two weapons were joined side-by-side and the drum magazines were mounted vertically, one on each side. None of these projects was accepted by any armed forces.

Lewis had also experimented with lighter, 30-06 calibre, box magazine-fed infantry rifle variants intended for shoulder or hip fire as a competition to the BAR. They were dubbed "Assault Phase Rifle" – what could be understood as the first use of the term "Assault Rifle", despite the weapon being, by today's designation, a battle rifle. Despite being three pounds lighter than it and loaded with very forward-thinking features for the time (such as an ambidextrous magazine release), the U.S. Army still chose to adopt the BAR.

A semi-automatic pistol using the Lewis gas system existed and a recoil-operated variant.

A short-barrelled light machine gun variant was developed by the Soley Arms Company at the start of the Second World War. It came with a hand guard and was fed from a 30-round Bren magazines; however, it was decided by the British authorities to concentrate production on the Bren, which had the advantage of a changeable barrel.

== Influence on later designs ==
- The German FG 42 paratrooper's rifle used the Lewis gun's gas assembly and bolt design which were in turn incorporated into the M60 machine gun.
- The Type 92 machine gun, the standard hand-held machine gun used by Imperial Japanese Navy aircraft gunners in WWII, was essentially a copy of the Lewis gun.
- The Russian PKP Pecheneg machine gun uses a streamlined version of the Lewis gun's forced air cooling in a fixed heavy barrel. This enables the Pecheneg to fire more than 600 rounds through the barrel without warping.

== Users ==
- (Algeria) Armée de Libération Nationale guerrillas
- Australia
- Belgium
- Biafra
- Bolivia
- Canada
- China — Used by warlord armies Between 1928 and 1930, Liu Xiang's army acquired 3,000 British Lewis Guns with 15 million cartridges.
- Czechoslovakia
- Dominican Republic
- Estonia — Kept in reserve in 1940.
- Finland — Small number captured from Russia and used during the Finnish Civil War; also used in WW2 by air force and as anti-aircraft weapons. Designated as 7,62 pk/Lewis and 7,70 pk/Lewis
- France
- Empire of Japan — Locally produced as the Type 92 and adopted by the navy
- German Empire — It is estimated that the Germans captured more than 10,000 Lewis guns in World War I. Those were converted to fire 8mm Mauser in a special factory in Belgium
- Germany — The Wehrmacht captured a significant number of British and Dutch Lewis guns in 1940, and put these into service with second-line troops as the l.MG 137(e) and l.MG 100(h).
- Qajar Iran – South Persia Rifles
- Iraq — By the time of the Anglo-Iraqi War, an Iraqi infantry battalion at full strength included 4 anti-aircraft Lewis guns.
- Ireland — Used by Irish Republican Army in the Anglo-Irish War and Irish Civil War. In use by the Irish National Army, then by all services in the Irish Defence Forces. Also used by the Provisional IRA during the early period of The Troubles.
- Israel
- Italy — Infantry variant, modified to be used on aircraft
- Latvia — Standard LMG during Latvian War of Independence and interwar period. Used in both infantry and anti-aircraft roles, ~8000 in stock by April 1936. Used by Latvian Police Battalions of WW2.
- Lithuania — Used in the interwar period
- Mexico
- Netherlands
- New Zealand
- Nicaragua
- Norway — Manufactured before WWI
- Philippines
- Poland
- Portugal
- Romania
- Russian Empire
- Soviet Union
- Spanish Republic
- Tibet
- (Jordan) Transjordan
- United Kingdom
  - Barbados
  - Bermuda — Bermuda Volunteer Rifle Corps
  - Ceylon
  - Fiji
  - Guiana
  - Hong Kong
  - India
  - Malaya
  - Mauritius
  - North Borneo
  - Northern Rhodesia
  - Somaliland — Somaliland Camel Corps
  - Southern Rhodesia
- United States
- Vietnam

== See also ==
- DP machine gun
- Emu War
- Johnston Model D1918 machine gun
- Mendoza C-1934
- List of U.S. Army weapons by supply catalog designation SNL A-11

== General and cited references ==
- Bullock, Arthur (2009). Gloucestershire Between the Wars: A Memoir. The History Press. pp. 62–64, 66, 69–70, 85–86. ISBN 978-0-7524-4793-3.
- Chant, Christopher (2001). Small Arms of World War II. London: Brown Partworks. ISBN 978-1-84044-089-8.
- Dambītis, Kārlis (2016). Latvijas armijas artilērija 1919.-1940.g.: Vieta bruņotajos spēkos, struktūra un uzdevumi [Artillery of the Latvian Army (1918–1940): structure, tasks and place in the Armed forces] (PhD thesis). University of Latvia.
- Ford, Roger (2005). The World's Great Machine Guns from 1860 to the Present Day. London: Amber Books. ISBN 978-1-84509-161-3.
- Glanfield, John (2001). The Devil's Chariots: The Birth and Secret Battles of the First Tanks. Stroud, UK: Sutton. ISBN 978-0-7509-4152-5.
- Grant, Neil (2014). The Lewis Gun. Oxford: Osprey. ISBN 978-1-78200-791-3.
- Hogg, Ian V. (1978). The Complete Illustrated Encyclopedia of the World's Firearms. A&W. ISBN 978-0-89479-031-7.
- Hogg, Ian V.; Batchelor, John (1976). The Machine-Gun (Purnell's History of the World Wars Special). London: Phoebus.
- Skennerton, Ian (1988). British Small Arms of World War 2. Margate, QLD (Australia): Ian Skennerton. ISBN 978-0-949749-09-3.
- Skennerton, Ian (2001). .303 Lewis Machine Gun. Small Arms Identification Series. Gold Coast, QLD (Australia): Arms & Militaria Press. ISBN 978-0-949749-42-0.
- Smith, Joseph E. (1973). Small Arms of the World (10th Rev. ed.). Harrisburg, PA (USA): Stackpole Books. ISBN 978-0-88365-155-1.
- Smith, W. H. B. (1979) [1943]. 1943 Basic Manual of Military Small Arms (facs. ed.). Harrisburg, PA (USA): Stackpole Books. ISBN 978-0-8117-1699-4.
- Townsend, Reginald T. (December 1916). "'Tanks' and 'The Hose of Death'". The World's Work: A History of Our Time. XXXIII: 195–207.
- Textbook of Small Arms 1929 (Repr. ed.). London; Dural, NSW: HMSO for War Office. 1999 [1929]. OCLC 4976525.
