= Everard Enos Hatch =

U.S. Army officer (1859–1940)

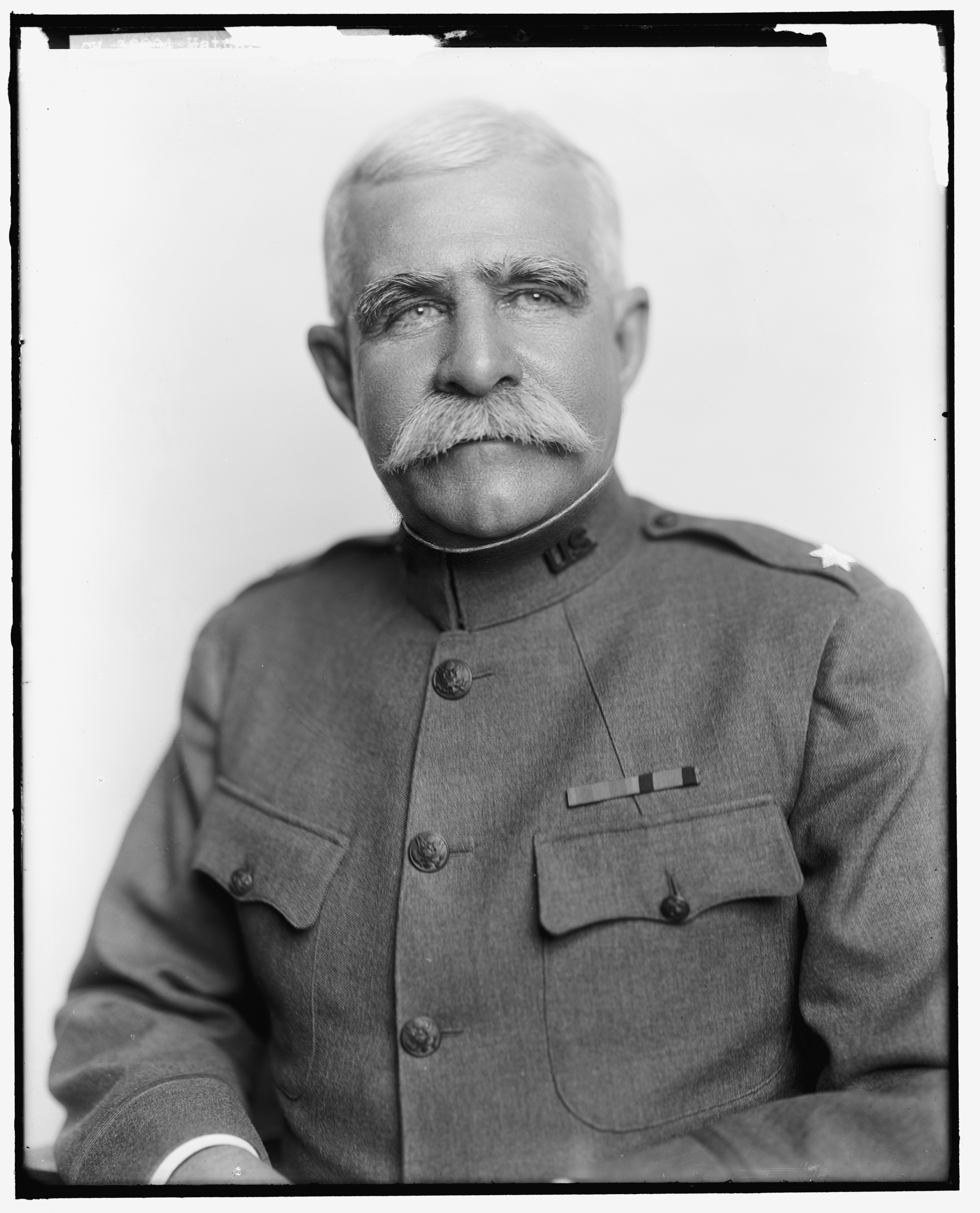
- Born: July 18, 1859; Montville, Maine
- Died: May 14, 1940 (aged 80); Laurel, Maryland
- Spouse: Mellie S. Rowe
- Military career
- Allegiance: United States
- Branch: United States Army
- Service years: 1890–1918
- Rank: Brigadier general
- Service number: 0-119
- Unit: Infantry Branch
- Commands: 158th Brigade
- Conflicts: Spanish–American War; Philippine–American War; United States occupation of Veracruz; World War I

Everard Enos Hatch (July 18, 1859 – May 14, 1940) was a United States Army officer in the late 19th and early 20th centuries. He served in several conflicts, including the Spanish–American War and World War I.

== Biography ==
Hatch was born on his father's farm in Montville, Maine, on July 18, 1859. His father, Enos M. Hatch, was an American Civil War veteran, having lost his right arm in the conflict. Hatch attended local public schools from 1865 to 1877, and in 1878, he worked in a general store and taught. After attending Eastern State Normal School in 1879, Hatch entered the United States Military Academy, graduating 15th in a class of 37 in June 1884.

Hatch was commissioned into the 18th Infantry Regiment and did frontier duty from 1884 to 1888. He was then assigned to Maine Agricultural College as a professor of Military Science and Tactics, something he did until 1891. Hatch then went to Fort Ringgold, Texas, and from 1894 to 1895, he served at the Clinton Liberal Institute.

Hatch participated in the Spanish–American War, the Philippine–American War, and the United States occupation of Veracruz. He graduated from the United States Army War College in 1915. He was promoted to the temporary rank of brigadier general on August 5, 1917, almost four months after the American entry into World War I. As a general, Hatch organized and trained the 158th Brigade.

After World War I ended, he reverted to his permanent rank of colonel. After commanding Fort Benjamin Harrison, Hatch served again with the American Expeditionary Forces from June through August 1919. He retired as a colonel in 1921, though Congress restored his brigadier general rank in June 1930.

Hatch served as the mayor of Laurel, Maryland from 1936 to 1940. He died on May 14, 1940, at the age of 80.

== Personal life ==
Hatch married his first wife, Mellie S. Rowe, on August 7, 1888, and his second wife Annie K. Spring on September 12, 1899. He was an Episcopalian.

== Bibliography ==
- Davis, Henry Blaine Jr. (1998). Generals in Khaki. Raleigh, North Carolina: Pentland Press. ISBN 1571970886. OCLC 40298151.
- Marquis Who's Who (1975). Who Was Who In American History – The Military. Chicago, Illinois: Marquis Who's Who. ISBN 0837932017.
