= Isaac Newton Lewis =

United States Army officer (1858–1931)

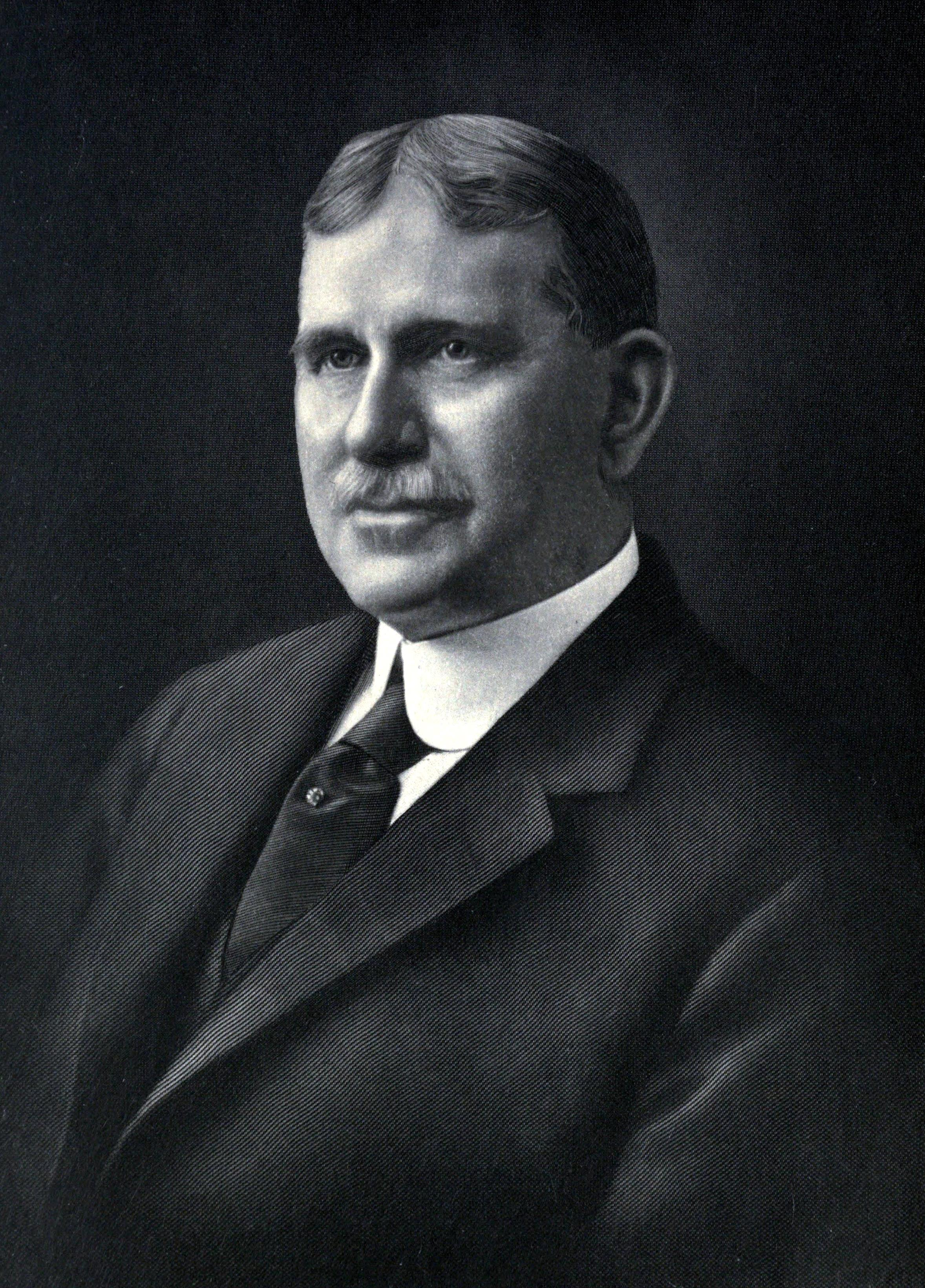
- Born: October 12, 1858; New Salem, Pennsylvania, US
- Died: November 9, 1931 (aged 73); Hoboken, New Jersey, US
- Occupations: Inventor, Officer
- Known for: Lewis gun

Isaac Newton Lewis (October 12, 1858 – November 9, 1931) was a United States Army officer and the inventor of the Lewis gun.

== Biography ==
Lewis was born in New Salem, Pennsylvania on October 12, 1858. He graduated 11th of 37 from the United States Military Academy in 1884 and was commissioned as a second lieutenant in the Second Artillery. Early in his career he made himself an authority on ordnance. In 1900, then-Captain Lewis was sent by Adjutant General Henry Clarke Corbin to Europe to study that subject, his report resulting in the re-armament of the field artillery. By successive promotions, he rose to the rank of colonel in the Coast Artillery Corps in August 1913, and he was retired the next month for disability incurred in line of duty.

In 1911, he refined an original machine gun design of Samuel Maclean and began active marketing of a type which came to be known simply as the "Lewis Gun", which was used in World War I, World War 2 (and through the Korean War) by the Allied armies, the United States Navy, and the airplanes of the United States and Allies. Initially, the United States Army was not interested in his new gun, but after the British and French had bought more than 100,000 for use in the trenches in France, the US Army did purchase them. Lewis, already a wealthy man, declined the royalties—amounting to at least $1.2 million (equivalent to $30 million in 2025)—on guns made for the United States after it entered the war.

His other inventions included a time-interval clock and bell system of signals, a replotting and relocating system for coast batteries, an automatic sight, quick-reading mechanical verniers for use in coast defenses, electric car lighting, and windmill electric lighting systems.

He was awarded the Franklin Institute's Elliott Cresson Medal in 1919.

== Death and interment ==
Lewis died from a myocardial infarction at the Lackawanna Railroad terminal in Hoboken, New Jersey, while waiting for a train to his home in Montclair.
