= Eugene Frederick Ladd =

United States Army general

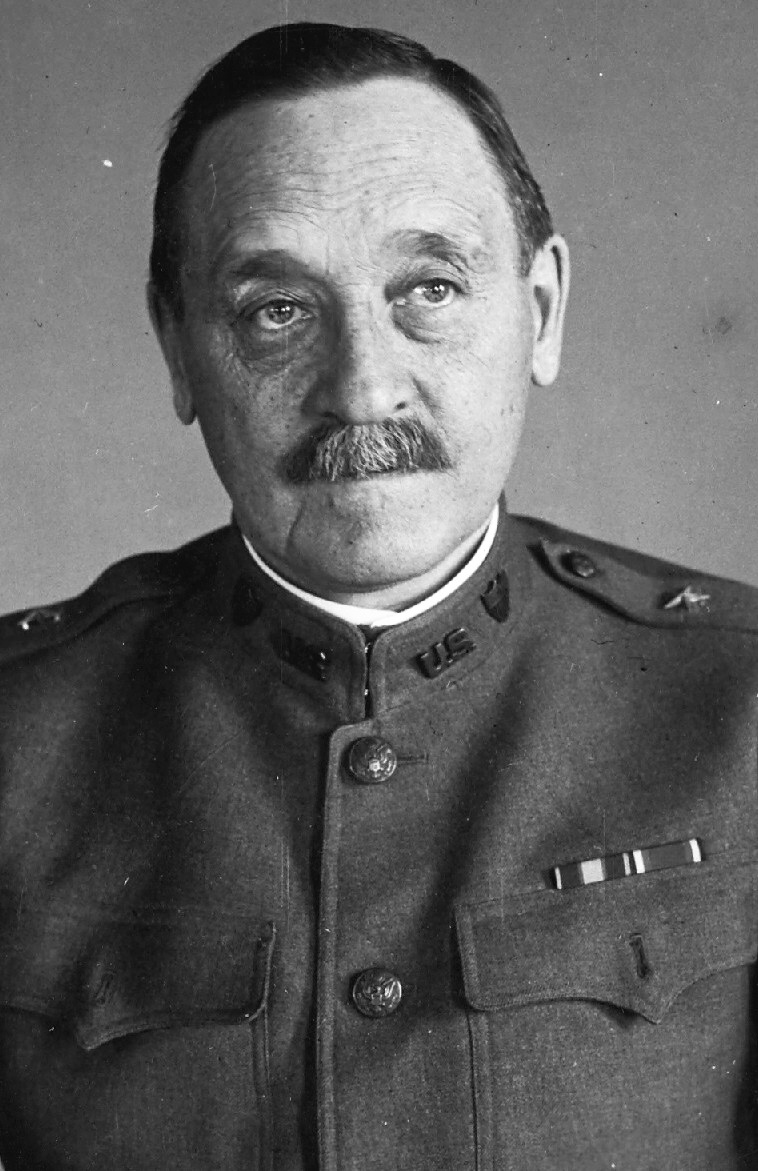
- Born: September 19, 1859; Thetford, Vermont
- Died: April 23, 1927 (aged 67); Boston, Massachusetts
- Burial place: Arlington National Cemetery
- Spouse: Violet Norman (m. 1888–1927, his death)
- Children: 1
- Military career
- Allegiance: United States
- Service: United States Army
- Service years: 1884–1915, 1917–1918
- Rank: Brigadier General
- Service number: 0-13295
- Units: U.S. Army Cavalry Branch; U.S. Army Adjutant General's Corps
- Conflicts: Bannock War of 1895; Spanish–American War; United States Military Government in Cuba; World War I
- Awards: Army Distinguished Service Medal

Eugene Frederick Ladd (September 19, 1859 – April 23, 1927) was a career officer in the United States Army. He attained the rank of brigadier general while on the staff of the Office of the U.S. Army Adjutant General during World War I.

== Early life and education ==
Ladd was born on September 19, 1859, in Thetford, Vermont, a son of George Ladd and Louise H. (Porter) Ladd. He graduated from Vermont's Randolph Normal School (now Vermont Technical College) in 1877. In 1880, he began attendance at the United States Military Academy, from which he graduated in 1884 ranked 12th of 37. He received his commission as a second lieutenant in the 9th Cavalry Regiment.

== Career ==
Ladd performed frontier duty at Fort Riley, Kansas, and Indian Territory from September 1884 to June 1885. He served at Fort McKinney, Wyoming, from June 1885 to August 1886, and Fort Duchesne, Utah, from August 1886 to May 1888. He served at Fort Robinson, Nebraska, until July 1896, and was promoted to first lieutenant in October 1889. Ladd served as the 9th Cavalry's regimental quartermaster from April 1891 to April 1895.

From July to November 1896, Ladd was assigned as depot quartermaster at Market Lake, Idaho. During this posting he took part in an expedition against the Bannock Indians which was a follow on operation to the Bannock War of 1895. From November 1896 to March 1897, Ladd served again at Fort Robinson. From March 1897 to May 1898, Ladd served as treasurer of the Soldiers' Home in Washington, D.C.

== Spanish–American War ==
On May 12, 1898, Ladd was promoted to temporary major for the Spanish–American War and assigned to quartermaster duty with the United States Volunteers. He served as acting chief quartermaster of the Second Army Corps at Camp Alger, Virginia, followed by assignment as chief quartermaster of 2nd Division, Second Army Corps during its training and organization at Camp Alger, Camp George Meade (Pennsylvania), and Camp Wetherill (South Carolina).

From March 1899 to May 1901, Ladd served in the U.S. Military Government in Cuba as treasurer and auditor of Cuban Customs. In July 1901 he received permanent promotion to captain.

== Continued career ==
Ladd served as constructing quartermaster at Fort Trumbull, New London, Connecticut, from July 1901 to June 1905. In this post, he was responsible for supervising creation of several Coast Artillery positions built to defend Long Island Sound. In June 1905, Ladd received permanent promotion to major. He served as military secretary and adjutant of the War Department general staff from June 1905 to April 1908. In March 1907, Ladd was promoted to lieutenant colonel.

From May 1908 to April 1910, Ladd served in the Philippines as adjutant of the Department of Luzon. During this posting, Ladd was appointed by Army Chief of Staff J. Franklin Bell to work with Captain Dwight E. Aultman to develop reliable sources for military intelligence in the Philippines.

From April 1910 to March 12, 1911, he served as adjutant of the Western Division in San Francisco, California. He then transferred to San Antonio, Texas, and served as adjutant of the 2nd Division. Ladd was promoted to colonel in August 1914. From August 1915 to October 1915, he served in the Office of the U.S. Army Adjutant General. On October 1, 1915, Ladd retired because of disability incurred in the line of duty.

== World War I ==
On June 17, 1917, Ladd was recalled to active duty for World War I and assigned to the Office of the U.S. Army Adjutant General on June 17, 1917. In August 1917, he was promoted to temporary brigadier general. During the war, Ladd's quartermaster and adjutant skills were employed in creating the framework for Army units as they were organized and fielded for the war.

Ladd retired again at his permanent rank of colonel on September 5, 1918. His wartime service was recognized with award of the Army Distinguished Service Medal, the citation for which reads:

The President of the United States of America, authorized by Act of Congress, July 9, 1918, takes pleasure in presenting the Army Distinguished Service Medal to Brigadier General Eugene Frederick Ladd, United States Army, for exceptionally meritorious and distinguished services to the Government of the United States, in a duty of great responsibility during World War I. While in charge of the Officers' Division of the Adjutant General's Office, General Ladd's comprehensive grasp of the new situations developing and his technical ability enabled him to perform the duties of his office with rare distinction, thus contributing greatly to the rapid organization of our new Army.

== Personal life ==
In 1888, Ladd married Violet D. Norman (1861–1939), the niece of Frederick Benteen's wife Catherine. They were the parents of daughter Katharine, the wife of Army officer William Torbert MacMillan.

== Retirement and death ==
In retirement, Ladd was a resident of Cohasset, Massachusetts. He died in Boston, Massachusetts, on April 23, 1927. Ladd was buried at Arlington National Cemetery. A federal law passed in 1930 permitted general officers from World War I to retire at the highest rank they held, and Ladd's rank of brigadier general was posthumously restored.
