= Grote Hutcheson =

U.S. Army general (1862–1948)

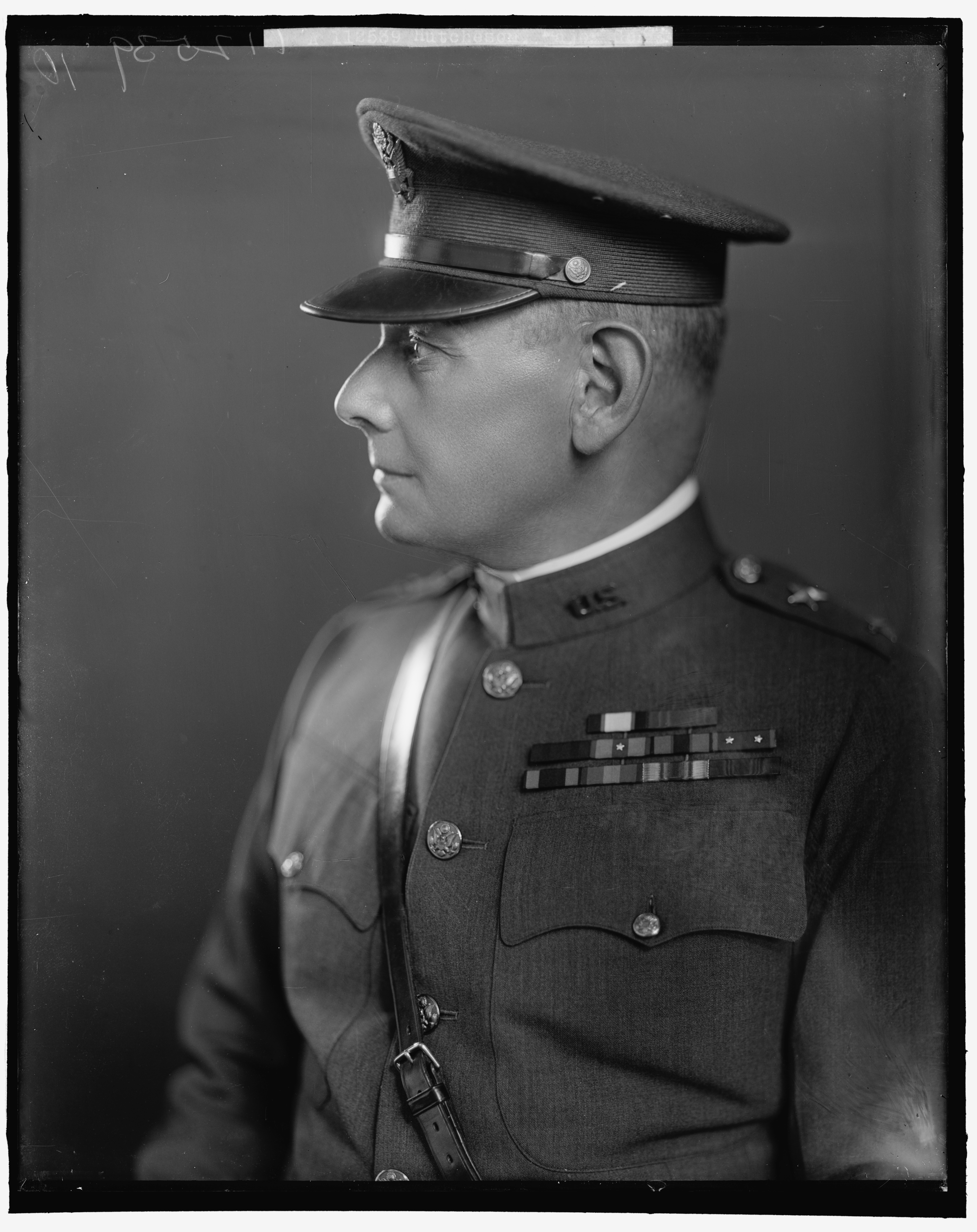
- Born: April 1, 1862; Cincinnati, Ohio, US
- Died: December 14, 1948 (aged 86); Saratoga, California, US
- Burial place: Arlington National Cemetery
- Spouse: Rosalie St. George
- Military career
- Branch: United States Army
- Service years: 1884–1924
- Rank: Major General
- Commands: 14th Infantry Division
- Conflicts: Sioux Wars: Pine Ridge Campaign; Spanish–American War: Puerto Rico Campaign; China Relief Expedition; Mexican Expedition World War I
- Awards: Army Distinguished Service Medal; Navy Distinguished Service Medal; Silver Star (3)

Grote Hutcheson (April 1, 1862 – December 14, 1948) was an officer of the U.S. Army from 1884 to 1924. After graduating from USMA in 1884, Hutcheson participated in the Pine Ridge Campaign. During the Spanish–American War, he was Adjutant General of the Puerto Rican Campaign. From 1899 to 1900, Hutcheson participated in the China Relief Expedition in which he received two Silver Star Commendations. From 1901 to 1902, Hutcheson was secretary to the Military Governor of the Philippines. He was then judge advocate of the Department of the East in Governor's Island, New York. From 1904 to 1908 Hutcheson was on the General Staff, serving in the office of Chief of Staff. From 1908 to 1910 and 1915 to 1916, Hutcheson was on the Mexican border. During World War I, Hutcheson formed the port of embarkation and Norfolk from 1917 to 1918, in which he was awarded the Army and Navy Distinguished Service Medals. Hutcheson then commanded the Fourteenth Infantry Division as major general. From 1920 to 1923, Hutcheson commanded the New York General Intermediate Depot as brigadier general and the Eleventh Field Artillery Brigade. Hutcheson retired in 1924 as major general due to disabilities.

== Early life ==
Grote Hutcheson was born April 1, 1862, to Ebenezer E. Hutcheson and Therese Turpini. Hutcheson attended the United States Military Academy and graduated twenty-fifth out of thirty-seven in the Class of 1884. Upon graduation, he was promoted to second lieutenant in the U.S. Army.

== Military career ==
=== Frontier Duty ===
Hutcheson served frontier duty in Oklahoma, serving at Fort Niobrara, Nebraska, from September 1885 to 1890. During this time, he was on leave to serve on the Department of the Platte, Rifle Competition, and Rifle Range. From November 1890 to March 27, 1891, Hutcheson was stationed at Fort Robinson, Nebraska, and participated during the Pine Ridge Campaign. On April 27, 1891, Hutcheson transferred to the 9th Cavalry at Powder River, Wyoming. He was assigned to the staff of Brigadier-General John J. Coppinger at the Department of Platte in Omaha, Nebraska. In 1895, Hutcheson took part in Bannock Indian campaign.

=== Spanish–American War ===
Hutcheson was assigned to Brigadier-General Theodore Schwan as captain and adjutant-general. He was stationed at Mobile, Alabama, Miami, and Tampa. On July 23, 1898, he embarked from Port Tampa on an expedition to Puerto Rico and landed at Ponce on July 31, 1898. Hutcheson participated at the Battle of Hormigueros and the Battle Las Marias on August 10 and 13. He was on sick leave on August 30, 1898. For his role in the Spanish–American War, Hutcheson was awarded the Silver Star

=== Boxer Rebellion ===
On June 9, 1889, Hutcheson was assigned as Adjutant-General of the Department of the Missouri in Omaha Nebraska. From April 1899 to May 1901, Hutcheson traveled to the Philippines and participated in the China Relief Expedition. He participated at the battle of Yangstun and Pekin. Hutcheson was a representative of the United States at Pao-thin-fu and secretary of the military governor of the Philippines. Hutcheson received two Silver Star commendations for his role in the China Relief Expedition.

According to Hutcheson, French forces burned each village they encountered during a 99-mile march and planted the French flag in the runs.

=== Before World War I ===
Upon returning to the United States, Hutcheson was judge advocate of the Department of the East on Governor's Island New York from 1903 to 1904. From 1904 to 1908, he was assigned to the General Staff, serving in the office of the chief of staff. In 1905, Hutcheson was on a special mission to observe maneuvers of the French Army. In 1908, he reported at Manila and Zamboanga and commanded Camp Overton, Mindanao until July 1908. From 1908 to 1910, he was captain of the 6th Cavalry at Fort Des Moines, Iowa. From 1911 to 1915, Hutcheson stationed at Fort Bliss, Fort Riley, and Fort Slocum.

=== World War I ===
From November 9, 1916, to April 21, 1917, Hutcheson commanded the Third Cavalry and inspector-general of Brownsville. During May 1917, He enlarged Fort Sam Houston and Fort Thomas. From 1917 to 1918, Hutcheson, created the port of embarkation and Norfolk, for which he was awarded the Army and Navy Distinguished Service Medals.

=== Later career ===
Hutcheson was promoted to major general on August 8, 1918. He commanded the Fourteenth Infantry Division at Camp Custer, Michigan and transferred it to Camp Meade, Maryland. In 1920, Hutcheson was promoted to brigadier general. He commanded the New York General Intermediate Deport from 1921 to 1923. Hutcheson was assigned at Fort Sill, Oklahoma, commanding the eleventh Field Artillery Brigade from October 1, 1922, to July 20, 1924. Hutcheson retired from service due to disabilities.

== Later life ==
Following military service, Hutcheson lived in Washington, D.C., for ten years. He then moved to Saratoga, California, where he died on December 14, 1948. Hutcheson was buried at Arlington National Cemetery.

== Personal life ==
On January 16, 1900, Grote Hutcheson married Rosalie St. George. Hutcheson was an Episcopalian and member of the Order of the Dragon, VFW, Union League Club, and Army and Navy Club. After his first wife's death in 1942, he married Anne Holt Pegram.

== Awards ==
=== Silver Star ===
==== Citation ====
Grote Hutcheson, United States Army, was cited for gallantry in action during the Puerto Rican Expedition in 1898.

==== Citation ====
Grote Hutcheson, United States Army, was cited for gallantry in action during the China Relief Expedition in 1900 – 1901. (Second Citation)

==== Citation ====
Grote Hutcheson, United States Army, was cited for gallantry in action during the China Relief Expedition in 1900 – 1901. (Third Citation)

=== Army Distinguished Service Medal ===
==== Citation ====
The President of the United States of America, authorized by Act of Congress, July 9, 1918, takes pleasure in presenting the Army Distinguished Service Medal to Major General Grote Hutcheson, United States Army, for exceptionally meritorious and distinguished services to the Government of the United States, in a duty of great responsibility during World War I, in the administration of the Port of Embarkation, Newport News, Virginia, in connection with the shipment of troops overseas.

=== Navy Distinguished Service Medal ===
==== Citation ====
The President of the United States of America takes pleasure in presenting the Navy Distinguished Service Medal to Major General Grote Hutcheson, United States Army, for distinguished service in the line of his profession as Commanding General, Port of Embarkation, Newport News, Virginia. By his close co-operation with the Commander, Newport News Division, Cruiser and Transport Force, the work of embarking troops and turnaround of transports were greatly expedited.
