= Wilbur L. Creech =

United States Air Force general (1927–2003)

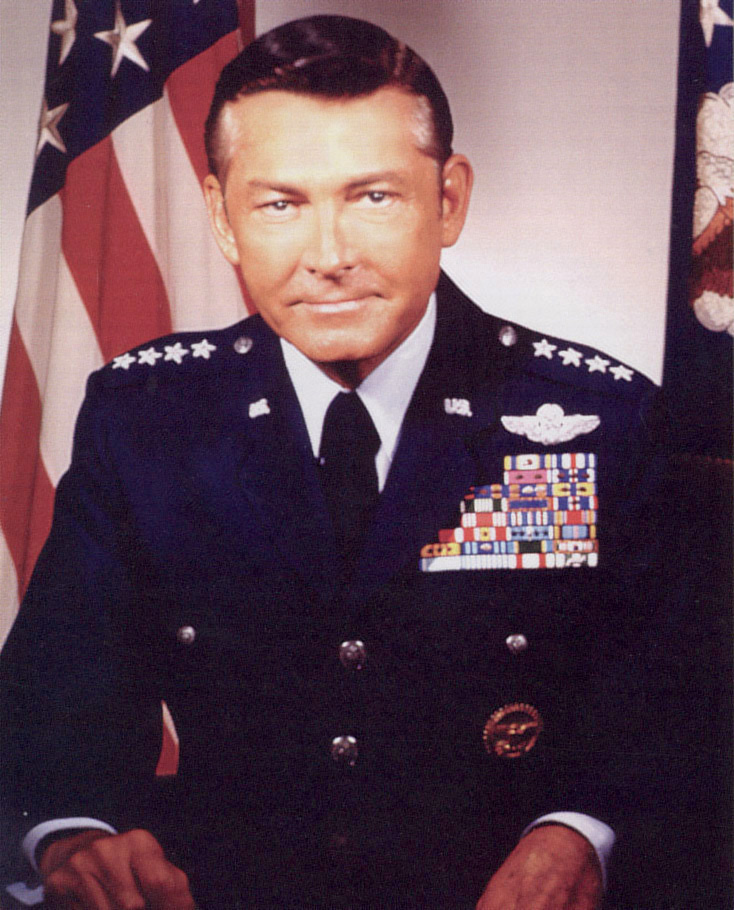
- General Wilbur L. Creech
- Born: March 30, 1927; Argyle, Missouri, U.S.
- Died: August 26, 2003 (aged 76); Henderson, Nevada, U.S.
- Burial place: Arlington National Cemetery
- Military career
- Allegiance: United States of America
- Branch: United States Air Force
- Service years: 1949–1984
- Rank: General
- Nickname: Bill
- Commands: Tactical Air Command
- Conflicts: Korean War; Vietnam War
- Awards: Air Force Distinguished Service Medal (2); Silver Star; Legion of Merit (3); Distinguished Flying Cross (4); Air Medal (16)

General Wilbur Lyman "Bill" Creech (March 30, 1927 – August 26, 2003) was a four-star general in the United States Air Force (USAF). He commanded Tactical Air Command (TAC), with headquarters at Langley Air Force Base, Virginia, from May 1, 1978, to December 31, 1984. As of February 1984, the now-inactive Major Command (MAJCOM) directed the activities of two Numbered Air Forces, three centers and seven air divisions. More than 111,300 military and civilian personnel were assigned to 32 TAC bases in the United States, Panama, Okinawa and Iceland. Tactical Air Command was the gaining organization for 58,300 Air National Guard and Air Force Reserve personnel in 149 major units throughout the United States.

Creech Air Force Base in Nevada is named in honor of him.

== Biography ==
General Creech was born in Argyle, Missouri, on March 30, 1927. His first experience with the military was when he enlisted as a private in July 1944 after graduating from Emmetsburg High School in Iowa. He earned a Bachelor of Science degree from the University of Maryland, a master's degree in international relations from The George Washington University, and graduated from the National War College in 1966. He received his wings and commission in September 1949 as a distinguished graduate of flying training school.

His first operational assignment was with the 51st Fighter Wing at Naha Air Base, Okinawa. During the Korean War he flew with the 51st Wing from Kimpo Air Base, South Korea and completed 103 combat missions over North Korea. He also served a combat tour of duty as a forward air controller with the United States Army's 27th Infantry Regiment, 25th Infantry Division.

In July 1951 General Creech was assigned as a flight commander at Luke Air Force Base near Phoenix, Arizona, where, for the next two and one-half years, he taught advanced gunnery to students from 14 nations. In November 1953 he joined the USAF aerial demonstration team, the Thunderbirds, and flew 125 official aerial demonstrations over the United States and Central America.

In January 1956 he became commander and leader of the United States Air Forces in Europe (USAFE) aerial demonstration team, the Skyblazers, based at Bitburg Air Base, West Germany. By December 1959 he had flown 399 official aerial demonstrations with this team throughout Europe, North Africa and the Middle East.

In June 1960 General Creech was named director of operations, USAF Fighter Weapons School at Nellis Air Force Base, Las Vegas, Nevada, where he served until February 1962. He then was assigned as a special adviser to the commander of the Argentine Air Force in Buenos Aires.

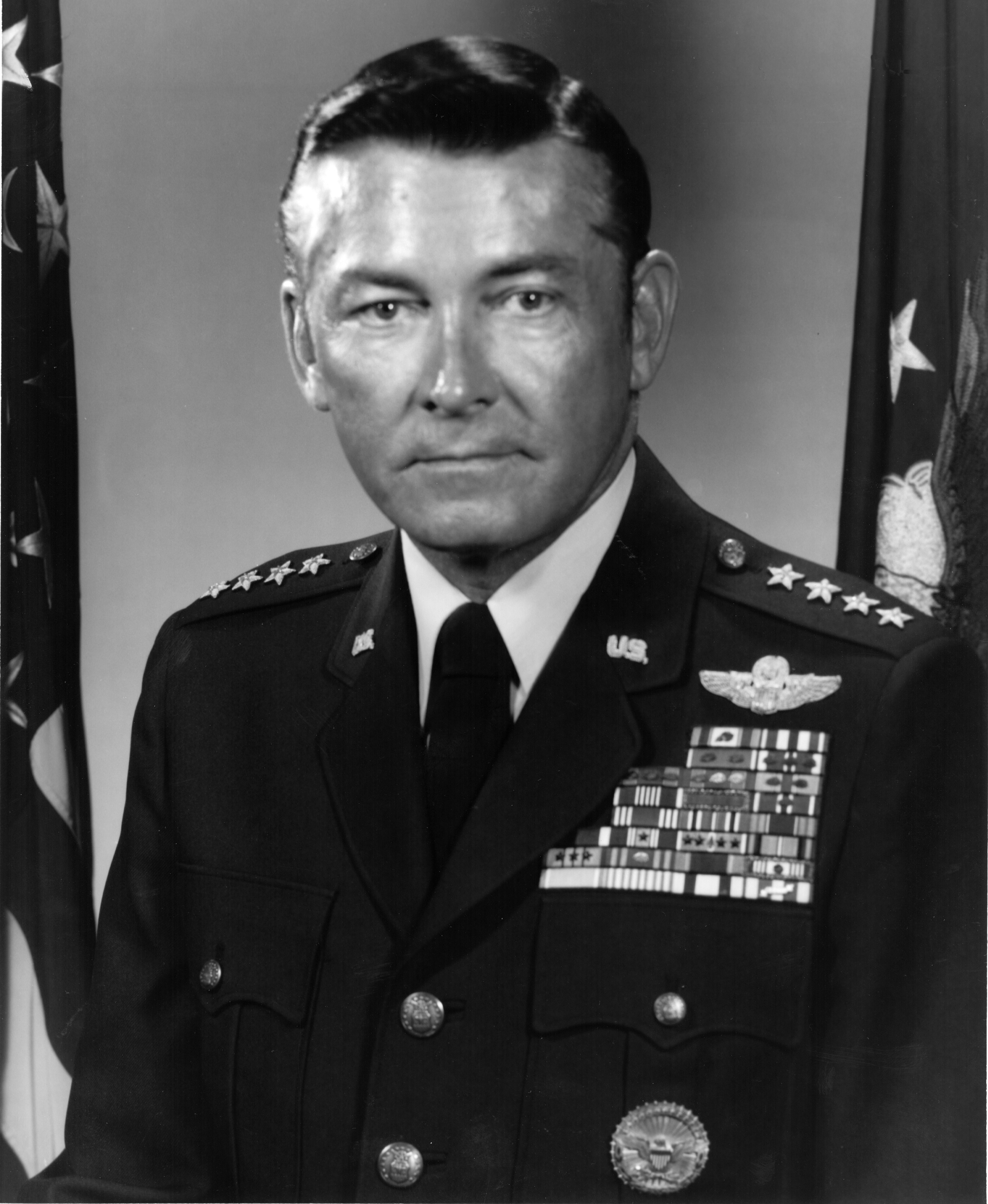
General Wilbur L. Creech

From August 1962 to August 1965, he was executive and aide to the commander of Tactical Air Command, Langley Air Force Base. In August 1965 he entered the National War College at Fort Lesley J. McNair, Washington, D.C. Upon graduation in June 1966, he was selected to be a staff assistant in the Office of the Secretary of Defense.

General Creech transferred to the Republic of Vietnam in November 1968 as deputy commander for operations of the 37th Tactical Fighter Wing, Phu Cat Air Base. After six months with the wing, during which he flew 177 combat missions, he became assistant deputy chief of staff for operations, Headquarters Seventh Air Force in Tan Son Nhut Air Base, Saigon.

In November 1969 General Creech was again assigned to USAFE and successively commanded two tactical fighter wings. After one year as commander of the 86th Tactical Fighter Wing at Zweibrücken Air Base, West Germany, he became the commander of the 401st Tactical Fighter Wing at Torrejon Air Base, Spain. From August 1971 until August 1974, General Creech served as deputy chief of staff for operations and intelligence, Headquarters USAFE at Lindsey Air Station and subsequently Ramstein Air Base, West Germany.

General Creech was assigned to Air Force Systems Command in September 1974 as vice commander of Aeronautical Systems Division at Wright-Patterson Air Force Base, Dayton, Ohio, and in October 1974 was appointed commander of the Electronic Systems Division at Hanscom Air Force Base, Massachusetts. The Electronic Systems Division manages the complex development and acquisition of command, control and communications equipment to meet the worldwide needs of the USAF and other Department of Defense agencies.

After two and one-half years as commander of Electronic Systems Division, General Creech was transferred to Washington, D.C., where he served concurrently as the assistant vice chief of staff, assistant to the Chief of Staff for Readiness and North Atlantic Treaty Organization matters and senior USAF member, Military Staff Committee, United Nations.

During his tenure as commander of TAC General Wilbur Creech pushed for the development of high-technology weapons systems that could overcome the expected numerical superiority of the Warsaw Pact forces. He championed the 'roll back' doctrine that focused on the suppression of enemy air defense as the initial priority, progressing from the front to the enemy's rear area to remove the threat to attacking aircraft and reduce the need for the low-level penetration tactics otherwise required to evade integrated air defense systems. In order to do this he promoted the development and fielding of long-range weapons that could be used day and night and in all weather. An example of this was the Enhanced Tactical Fighter program that resulted in the production of the F-15E Strike Eagle all-weather long-range strike fighter. Other examples were the AGM-65D Maverick all-weather imaging infrared ground-attack missile and the LANTIRN integrated navigation and targeting system. Creech kept in place the realistic training program implemented under his predecessor Robert J. Dixon's leadership, but with an added emphasis on flight safety.

He was a command pilot, experienced in 40 different military fighter, cargo and reconnaissance aircraft.

== Post-military ==
In 1985, after retiring from the Air Force, General Creech moved to Henderson, Nevada and began his own management advisory company, where he consultant for companies like General Electric, General Motors, IBM, ITT, Johnson & Johnson, Litton and Lockheed. He also became a motivational speaker and served on the Chicago-based Centel's corporate board and on the board of directors for several smaller corporations.

Creech died on Tuesday, August 26, 2003 at his home in Henderson. He was interred with full military honors at Arlington National Cemetery.

== Awards and decorations ==
US Air Force Command Pilot Badge
Office of the Secretary of Defense Identification Badge

Air Force Distinguished Service Medal with one bronze oak leaf cluster
Silver Star
Legion of Merit with two oak leaf clusters
Distinguished Flying Cross with three oak leaf clusters
Air Medal with fifteen oak leaf clusters
Air Force Commendation Medal with two oak leaf clusters
Army Commendation Medal
Air Force Presidential Unit Citation
Air Force Outstanding Unit Award with oak leaf cluster
Army Good Conduct Medal
American Campaign Medal
World War II Victory Medal
Army of Occupation Medal
National Defense Service Medal with one bronze service star
Korean Service Medal with nine service stars
Armed Forces Expeditionary Medal
Vietnam Service Medal with three service stars
Air Force Longevity Service Award with silver and two bronze oak leaf clusters
Small Arms Expert Marksmanship Ribbon
Vietnam Air Service Medal, Honor Class
Grand Cross of Aeronautical Merit, White Distinction (Spain)
Order of National Security Merit, Tong-il Medal
Republic of Korea Presidential Unit Citation
United Nations Korea Medal
Vietnam Campaign Medal

== Diamond Crash accident ==
The 1982 Diamond Crash was an accident that involved four Northrop T-38 Talon jets in training on 18 January 1982, killing all four pilots. It is the worst operational accident in the history of the U.S. Air Force Thunderbirds Air Demonstration Team. When this accident happened, Wilbur Creech was the commanding general of the USAF Tactical Air Command. On 2 April 1984 all copies of the crash videotape were destroyed, with Creech himself erasing the final crash segment of the master tape. He claimed to have done this to save the families from morbid sensationalism. At the time of the destruction, the families of the pilots and NBC had already demanded access to the tapes as part of a suit against Northrop Corporation and a Freedom of Information Act request, respectively. Creech did not seek JAG guidance prior to destroying the tapes, and asked personnel who had been involved in reviewing the tapes to leave the room prior to his erasure.

On June 20, 2005, Indian Springs Air Force Auxiliary Field, where the accident happened, officially changed its name to Creech Air Force Base in honor of General Wilbur L. "Bill" Creech, who was known as the "father of the Thunderbirds" and who was himself a Thunderbird pilot.

== Publications ==
The Five Pillars of TQM: How to Make Total Quality Management Work for You (1995) ISBN 0-452-27102-9 written under the pen name Bill Creech

== See also ==
- List of commanders of Tactical Air Command
