= William W. Momyer =

United States Air Force general (1916–2012)

William Wallace Momyer
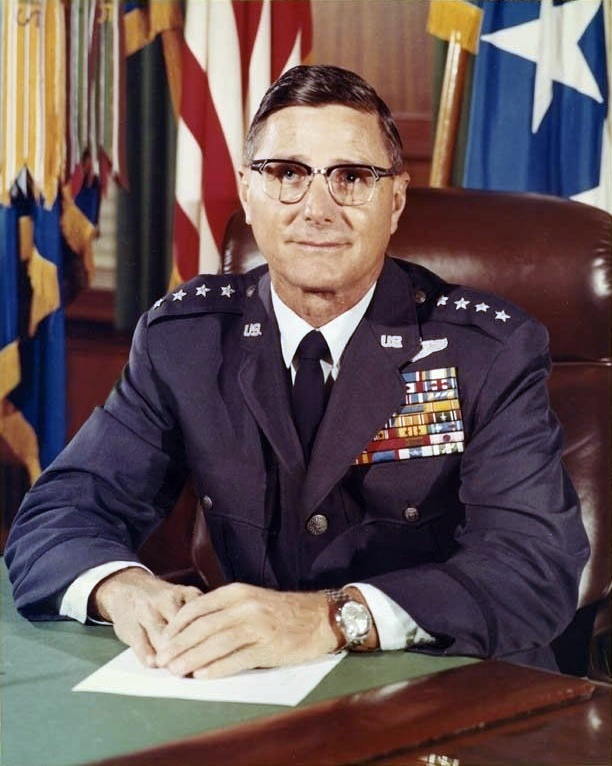
- General William W. Momyer
- Born: September 23, 1916; Muskogee, Oklahoma, U.S.
- Died: August 10, 2012 (aged 95); Merritt Island, Florida, U.S.
- Burial place: Arlington National Cemetery
- Military career
- Allegiance: United States
- Branch: United States Army Air Corps; United States Army Air Forces; United States Air Force
- Service years: 1938–1973
- Rank: General
- Nickname: Spike
- Commands: Tactical Air Command; Air Training Command; Seventh Air Force; 832d Air Division; 312th Fighter-Bomber Wing; 314th Air Division; 8th Fighter-Bomber Wing; 33rd Fighter Group
- Conflicts: World War II; Vietnam War
- Awards: Distinguished Service Cross; Air Force Distinguished Service Medal (2); Army Distinguished Service Medal (2); Silver Star (3); Legion of Merit (3); Distinguished Flying Cross

William Wallace Momyer (September 23, 1916 – August 10, 2012) was a general officer and fighter pilot in the United States Air Force (USAF). Among his notable posts were those commanding Air Training Command, the Seventh Air Force during the Vietnam War, and Tactical Air Command (TAC). During his tour in Southeast Asia, he was concurrently the deputy commander of Military Assistance Command, Vietnam (MACV) for air operations and thus responsible for Operation Rolling Thunder, the air campaign against North Vietnam, which Momyer executed in the face of micromanagement from President Lyndon B. Johnson and Secretary of Defense Robert S. McNamara.

Momyer was acknowledged in the USAF community as "a true expert in tactical air warfare". His predecessor as commander of TAC, General Gabriel P. Disosway, described him as difficult to work for or with because he was "much smarter than most people". After his retirement in 1973, he spent five years researching and writing Airpower in Three Wars, his treatise on airpower doctrine, strategy, and tactics.

Momyer is a controversial figure historically for displaying racist attitudes during World War II when as a fighter group commander he recommended that the 99th Fighter Squadron, a segregated African American unit then attached to his command, be removed from combat operations. The controversy reached the highest levels of the United States Army Air Forces (USAAF), was widely reported in the American press, and resulted in an official study that exculpated the "Tuskegee Airmen".

== Early life ==
Momyer was born in 1916, the son of a lawyer in Muskogee, Oklahoma. He was 14 when his father died of a heart attack and he moved with his mother to Seattle, Washington, where he attended Broadway High School and graduated with a Bachelor of Arts degree from the University of Washington in 1937.

Momyer entered military service in 1938 as an aviation cadet in the Air Corps, and after successfully completing primary and basic pilot training at Randolph Field, moved on to the advanced training school at Kelly Field, Texas, graduating in February 1939. He received his commission as a second lieutenant and a rating of pilot, assigned to pilot and flight commander duties until February 1941, when he became military observer for air with the military attaché in Cairo, Egypt. In this capacity, he was technical advisor to the Royal Air Force in equipping the first squadrons of the Western Desert Air Force with Curtiss Tomahawk fighters, which enabled him to fly combat missions. (Note: Boyne notes that one of the units with which Momyer flew was No. 112 Squadron RAF, the first unit to paint the "shark's teeth" markings associated with P-40s on its aircraft.) His nickname within the service was "Spike".

== Service in World War II ==
Early in 1942, during World War II at the age of 25, Momyer replaced Colonel Elwood R. Quesada as commanding officer of the Curtiss P-40 Warhawk-equipped 33d Fighter Group (FG). In October the group was carried to North Africa aboard the USS Chenango as part of Operation Torch. Launching from the aircraft carrier on November 10, the group attempted to land at the Port Lyautey airfield in French Morocco, which was still under occasional fire from French forces. Several aircraft were disabled in landing accidents and Momyer was awarded the Silver Star for personally extricating a trapped pilot from a P-40 that had flipped onto its back.

From Telergma Airfield, Algeria, and Thelepte Airfield, Tunisia, Momyer led the 33rd FG on combat missions in the Tunisia, Sicily and Naples-Foggia campaigns. For his performance during several combat actions of the North African campaign, he received the Distinguished Service Cross and two oak leaf clusters to his Silver Star. In North Africa, while leading his group on a ground attack against German positions near El Guettar, he single-handedly engaged 18 Junkers Ju 87 (Stuka) aircraft escorted by German and Italian fighters on 31 March 1943, and had four confirmed kills. He accrued more than 200 combat flying hours and became an ace with eight credited aerial victories.

During the initial campaign to evict the Axis forces from Tunisia in which the Luftwaffe had air superiority, the 33rd FG, in addition to supporting the push to the east, kept half of its operational strength in reserve in the Oran area to help the Twelfth Air Force guard the Strait of Gibraltar and other lines of communication from possible attack from Spain or Spanish Morocco. (Note: Only two of its three squadrons were forward-based at Thelepte, and both of those were half-strength due to combat losses and the transfer of P-40s on 9 January 1943 to the Free French to equip the first squadron of GCII/5. (Mayock, p. 112)) Because of the inadequate training and equipment of the A-20 Havoc light bomber complement of the XII Air Support Command and the tactical ineffectiveness of the Free French Air Forces P-40 squadron attached, the burden of air support fell primarily on the understrength 33rd FG. Thus despite cautions from Generals Jimmy Doolittle and Howard Craig to group commanders to conserve strength, Momyer was compelled to commit his aircraft to battle in small increments.

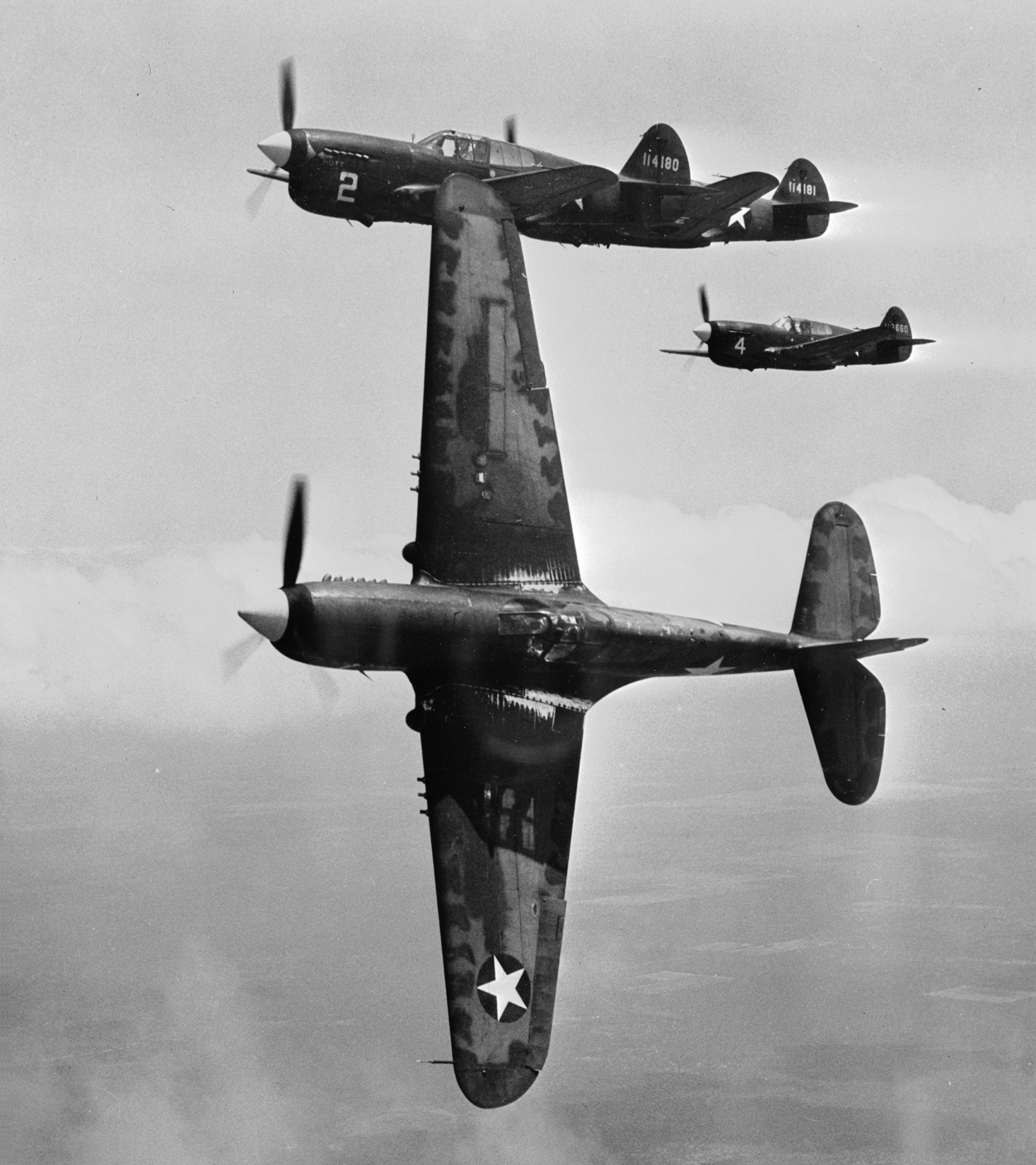
Curtiss P-40Fs similar to those flown by the 33rd FG in 1942–43

The priority of demands by ground force commanders for "umbrellas" (defensive air cover from attacks by Stukas) meant that other tactical missions such as close air support and escort were necessarily left to small elements, and without air superiority, attrition was high during the German offensives in central Tunisia of 18 and 30 January 1943. On 2 February 1943, during German attacks on Faid Pass, where the Luftwaffe had been reinforced by the remains of the Desert Luftwaffe retreating with field marshal Erwin Rommel, the group was tasked to provide both air cover for Allied ground forces under attack by Stukas and escort for attacking USAAF bombers, losing nine aircraft. As a consequence, the 33rd FG was one of four Twelfth Air Force groups (Note: In addition to the 33rd FG, the 14th Fighter Group (P-38s), 52nd Fighter Group (Spitfire Vs), and 319th Bomb Group (B-26s) also had to be withdrawn because of severe attrition in the month leading up to Kasserine. (Mayock, pp. 156–157)) so debilitated that they were withdrawn from combat to make up losses in pilots and acquire better aircraft. (Note: The "better equipment" for the 33rd FG was the P-40N variant, whose air combat capability was much closer to that of the German Bf 109 Gustav then in use in Tunisia. (Mayock, p. 159))

Of the situation, Momyer himself said:

The German Air Force controlled the air in northern and southern Tunisia. Friendly losses were so high that the mission of the air forces and the structure of the command and control system had to change drastically... The German fighters, by concentrating against small formations of U.S. and British fighters trying to maintain umbrellas over ground forces throughout the day, made Allied air losses prohibitive.

Soon after, during the Battle of the Kasserine Pass, Allied tactical airpower was reorganized in North Africa with the activation on 18 February of the Northwest African Tactical Air Force (NATAF), under the command of Royal Air Force Air Marshal Arthur Coningham. (Note: The reorganization of Allied tactical airpower in North Africa was not a consequence of the Kasserine crisis but the result of decisions handed down from the Casablanca Conference a month before.) The 33rd FG returned to combat on 22 February from Youks-les-Bains Airfield, the last forward field for the Twelfth Air Force. Coningham, like Momyer, advocated attacks on the Luftwaffe including their airbases to achieve air superiority, which they considered essential before direct air support of ground units could be undertaken. NATAF initiated a counter-air campaign in mid-March that achieved air superiority soon after. The 33rd FG, operating from the recaptured Sbeitla Airfield, transitioned at the direction of Coningham to the role of fighter-bomber at the same time and increased its effectiveness while decreasing its losses.

Following the surrender of Axis forces in North Africa on 13 May, the Allied air forces immediately began a campaign of softening up the island of Pantelleria in preparation for Operation Corkscrew, the amphibious landing to seize the island scheduled for 11 June as a preliminary step in the Allied invasion of Sicily. The 33rd FG began fighter-bomber attacks on the island on 29 May, augmented by attachment to the group of the segregated 99th Fighter Squadron (known unofficially as the "Tuskegee Airmen"), which flew its first combat mission on 2 June. (Note: The 99th FS was a separate squadron unassigned to any group until May 1944. It was assigned directly to XII Air Support Command and temporarily attached to groups for its combat missions. The 99th was twice attached to the 33d FG, in May–June and August–October 1943.) Following the surrender of Pantelleria on 11 June, the 33rd FG maintained patrols over the island and Allied shipping until 26 June, when it moved to the island's airfield to begin attacks on Sicily, invaded in July. The 99th FS was then sent to another group.

=== Racial controversy ===
In September 1943, after the 99th FS was again attached to his group, Momyer recommended in a memo to Major General Edwin J. House, commanding XII Air Support Command, that it be removed from operations and assigned coastal patrol duties in P-39 Airacobras, alleging that it was ineffective in combat because "(in) my opinion... they have failed to display the aggressiveness and desire for combat that are necessary to a first-class fighting organization. It may be expected that we will get less work and less operational time out of the 99th than any squadron in this group." One source claimed that Momyer had blamed the squadron for seeing little air-to-air combat while ignoring both their being awarded a Distinguished Unit Citation and that he had personally ordered them into a ground attack role. (Note: The 99th FS earned this Distinguished Unit Citation while attached to the 324th Fighter Group and it had not yet been awarded for Momyer to "ignore.") House forwarded his own memo with a similar recommendation to NAAF Deputy Commander Major General John K. Cannon based partly on Momyer's report, and within four days the memo went up the chain of command to Headquarters USAAF in Washington D.C.

Reports in the press that the USAAF was considering downgrading the combat role of the 99th FS, partly based on Momyer's assessment, were followed in October by a review conducted by the War Department's Advisory Committee on Negro Troop Policies, after House's report reached it, in which Colonel Benjamin O. Davis Jr. refuted the allegations and defended his former command. The 99th FS continued to serve in combat, although with different groups, and by July 1944 was reassigned to the African-American 332nd Fighter Group, which consisted of the 100th, 301st, and 302nd FSs. An official study was then undertaken to compare the 99th's performance with that of other P-40 units operating in the Mediterranean; it reported on 30 March 1944 that the 99th had performed as well as the other Warhawk outfits. (Note: The study was conducted by the AAF's Statistical Control Division, Office of Management Control, and examined operations between 3 July 1943 and 31 January 1944. (Haulman "Chronology", p. 19)) Historian Walter J. Boyne wrote: "Momyer's illustrious combat record was tarnished by (the) incident of racial intolerance... at a time when such attitudes were still pervasive... Momyer's assessment was wrong."

Momyer was replaced in command of the 33rd FG in October 1943, and did not receive another combat command during the remainder of the war. (Note: Momyer was replaced in command of the 33rd FG on the same date that the 99th FS was attached to the 79th Fighter Group in Italy, and the day after Davis defended his squadron's performance to a War Department inquiry. (Haulman "Chronology", p. 14))

He returned to the United States in 1944 to become chief of the Combined Operations Branch of the Army Air Forces Board, with the mission of devising doctrine for cooperation of air, land, and sea forces in combat operations. From his work came USAAF (and later USAF) doctrine that after the first priority of achieving air superiority was successful, the next priority for airpower was isolating an enemy's forward forces by destroying his forces in the rear.

== Post-World War II and USAF career ==
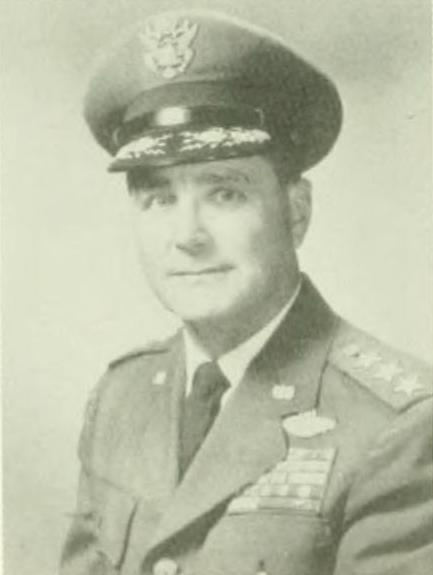
Lieutenant General Momyer as Commander, Air Training Command

He became the Assistant Chief of Staff (A-5) for Tactical Air Command in 1946 during the formation of TAC headquarters, and continued serving with TAC until he entered the Air War College in 1949.

Upon graduation from the Air War College in 1950 he became a member of the faculty. He attended the U.S. Army War College in 1953–1954 and then went to the Republic of Korea where he commanded the 8th Fighter-Bomber Wing. With the redeployment of units from Korea to Japan, the 8th Fighter-Bomber Wing moved to Itazuke Air Base.

In March 1955 Momyer returned to Korea to establish the 314th Air Division and command all United States Air Force units there. Returning to the United States in October 1955, he assumed command of the 312th Fighter-Bomber Wing at Clovis Air Force Base, New Mexico, (subsequently renamed Cannon Air Force Base).

Momyer assumed command of the 832d Air Division, Cannon AFB, in May 1957. As commander of the two F-100D Super Sabre fighter wings, he had the distinction of commanding the first units to take top honors for both conventional and special weapons teams during the USAF Fighter Weapons Meet at Nellis Air Force Base, Nevada.

Momyer was director of plans, Headquarters TAC, Langley Air Force Base, Virginia, from July 1958 to October 1961. He was assigned to Headquarters USAF from October 1961 to February 1964 as director of operational requirements, and during the period of February–August 1964, as assistant deputy chief of staff, programs and requirements. Of this period in his career, Boyne writes: "Characteristically, he continued to do as much work as possible himself, earning fame for his reading speed and total recall. This performance masked an important shortfall, though: By failing to use his deputies effectively, he also failed to train a next generation to replace him."

== Vietnam-era commands ==
In August 1964 Momyer became commander of the Air Training Command and held that post until July 1966, when he went to South Vietnam to serve as Deputy Commander for Air Operations, Military Assistance Command, Vietnam (MACV), and concurrently, Commander, Seventh Air Force. He served in this important dual role until August 1968, at which time he assumed command of Tactical Air Command. During Momyer's tour in Southeast Asia and the Vietnam War, he was a vigorous exponent of an all-jet air force, believing that jet fighter-bombers could outperform the often more accurate but slower (and thus more vulnerable) propeller-driven strike aircraft such as A-1 Skyraiders and T-28 Trojans.

Momyer has been subject to criticisms for his relationship to subordinates and insistence on implementation of his own views. Brigadier General Chuck Yeager, in his autobiography, related that in early 1968 he had been assigned as prospective commander of the 35th Tactical Fighter Wing, a unit at Phan Rang Air Base in Vietnam. While he was awaiting orders, Yeager was advised that Momyer had rejected him because as Seventh Air Force commander, he was entitled to select his own wing commanders and had not been consulted about the assignment. This resulted in Yeager being forced on Momyer by General John D. Ryan, Pacific Air Forces (PACAF) commander and a Yeager admirer. Although Momyer prevailed in the subsequent political tug of war, the controversy resulted in Momyer's lasting enmity towards Yeager, whom he had never met, for reasons that Yeager was unable to discern. Later that year Momyer became commander of TAC, in which Yeager was now a wing commander, culminating in early 1969 in a showdown in which Momyer purportedly threatened to terminate Yeager's command and possibly career. Yeager instead was promoted to brigadier general when the promotion board requested that Yeager be added to its selection choices after Momyer did not include him as one of his TAC recommendations.

Boyne stated: "(Momyer) brushed off subordinates’ opinions even though he often questioned his superiors’ views when they differed from his own." However, he supported Colonel Jack Broughton in his lobbying of higher echelons to have planning of air missions against North Vietnam determined by local commanders instead of being dictated by the White House, although Momyer later withheld award of decorations earned by Broughton when Ryan, one of the higher echelons opposing the lobbying, made known his intense dislike of Broughton. Momyer also notably brought Colonel Robin Olds to the Seventh Air Force, despite a personal animus, to reduce loss rates in the 8th Tactical Fighter Wing, and implemented the tactical initiative Operation Bolo proposed by Olds even while expressing personal disapproval of Olds' public persona.

Momyer retired from the USAF on September 30, 1973. He and his wife, Marguerite Willson Momyer, were married 69 years until her death in 2004. He died from heart failure on August 10, 2012, at an assisted living center in Merritt Island, Florida, aged 95.

== Awards and decorations ==
Momyer received the following awards and decorations:

USAF Command Pilot Badge

- Distinguished Service Cross
- Air Force Distinguished Service Medal with oak leaf cluster
- Army Distinguished Service Medal with oak leaf cluster
- Silver Star with two oak leaf clusters
- Legion of Merit with two oak leaf clusters
- Distinguished Flying Cross
- Légion d'honneur, Knight (France)
- Distinguished Flying Cross (United Kingdom)
- Order of National Security Merit, Tong-Il Medal
- Knight Grand Cross of the Order of the Crown of Thailand
- National Order of Vietnam, Commander
- Vietnam Air Force Distinguished Service Order, 2nd class
- Vietnam Gallantry Cross with palm
- Vietnam Air Gallantry Cross with silver wings
- Vietnam Campaign Medal

== Notes ==
Footnotes

Citations

== See also ==
- List of commanders of Tactical Air Command
