= Robert Russ =

Robert Russ may refer to:

- Robert Russ (painter) (1847–1922), Austrian painter
- Robert Edwin Russ (1830–1902), founder of Ruston, Louisiana
- Robert D. Russ (1933–1997), United States Air Force general
- Robert Russ (music producer) (born 1971), German music producer
