= Frank Everest =

Frank Everest may refer to:

- Frank F. Everest (1904–1983), U.S. Air Force general, and commander of Tactical Air Command
- Frank Kendall Everest Jr. (1920–2004), U.S. Air Force test pilot and general
