= Ralph Royce =

United States Army Air Forces general

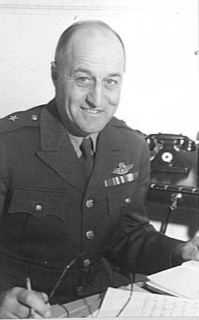
- Major General Ralph Royce, pictured here in 1942
- Born: 28 June 1890; Marquette, Michigan, United States
- Died: 7 August 1965 (aged 75); Miami-Dade County, Florida, United States
- Military career
- Allegiance: United States of America
- Branch: United States Army
- Service years: 1914−1946
- Rank: Major General
- Commands: Personnel Distribution Command; 1st Provisional Tactical Air Force; First Air Force; 20th Bombardment Wing; 7th Bombardment Group; 1st Pursuit Group; 1st Observation Group; 1st Aero Squadron
- Conflicts: World War I: Pancho Villa Expedition; Battle of Saint-Mihiel; Meuse-Argonne Offensive; World War II: Philippines campaign (1941–1942); Kokoda Track Campaign; Mediterranean and Middle East Theatre (1943–1944); France and Germany (1944–1945)
- Awards: Distinguished Service Cross; Distinguished Service Medal; Legion of Merit; Distinguished Flying Cross; Croix de guerre Order of the White Eagle

Signature
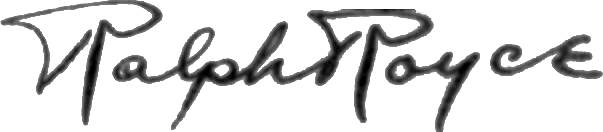

Ralph Royce (28 June 1890 – 7 August 1965) was a United States Army Air Forces general during World War II. A West Point graduate who learned to fly in 1915–16, he served with the 1st Aero Squadron in the Pancho Villa Expedition and later led it on the Western Front. During World War II as a brigadier general, he led the Royce special mission to Mindanao, in which a small force of bombers flew from Australia to attack Japanese targets in the Philippines. Later he was Deputy Commander of the Ninth Air Force and commanded the 1st Provisional Tactical Air Force.

== Early life ==
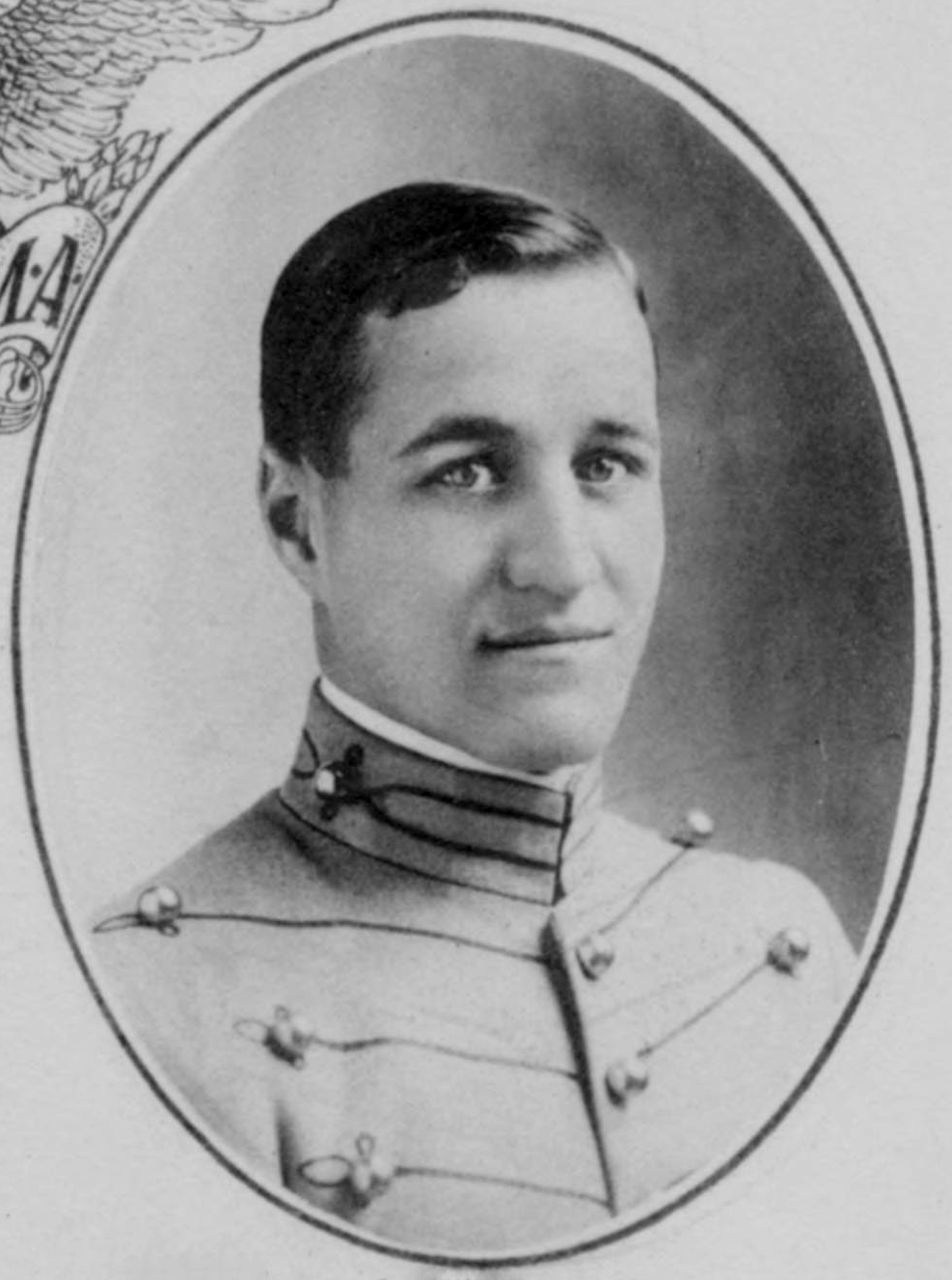
At West Point in 1914

Ralph Royce was born in Marquette, Michigan on 28 June 1890 and attended school at Hancock, Michigan. He entered the United States Military Academy at West Point on 1 March 1910. During his senior year, he served as captain of the ice hockey team. He graduated 12 June 1914, ranked 89th in merit in a class of 107 cadets, and was commissioned as a second lieutenant in the 26th Infantry. Among his fellow graduates included men such as William H. Holcombe, James B. Cress, Charles P. Gross, Brehon B. Somervell, Robert W. Crawford, Dabney O. Elliott, Arthur R. Harris, LaRhett L. Stuart, John B. Anderson, Harry C. Ingles, James L. Bradley, John H. Woodberry, Harold F. Loomis, Carl Spaatz, Harold R. Bull, Charles M. Milliken, Joseph W. Byron, Paul C. Paschal, Francis R. Kerr, Vicente Lim, Sylvester D. Downs Jr., Orlando Ward, Benjamin G. Weir, William O. Ryan, Frank W. Milburn, John B. Thompson and Jens A. Doe. All of them would later rise to the rank of brigadier general or higher in their later military careers. In 1915, Royce was detailed to the Aviation Section, U.S. Signal Corps (ASSC) and sent to the Signal Corps Aviation School at Rockwell Field, California, for pilot training. On graduation on 16 May 1916, he was rated a Junior Military Aviator and promoted to temporary first lieutenant in the ASSC.

== World War I ==
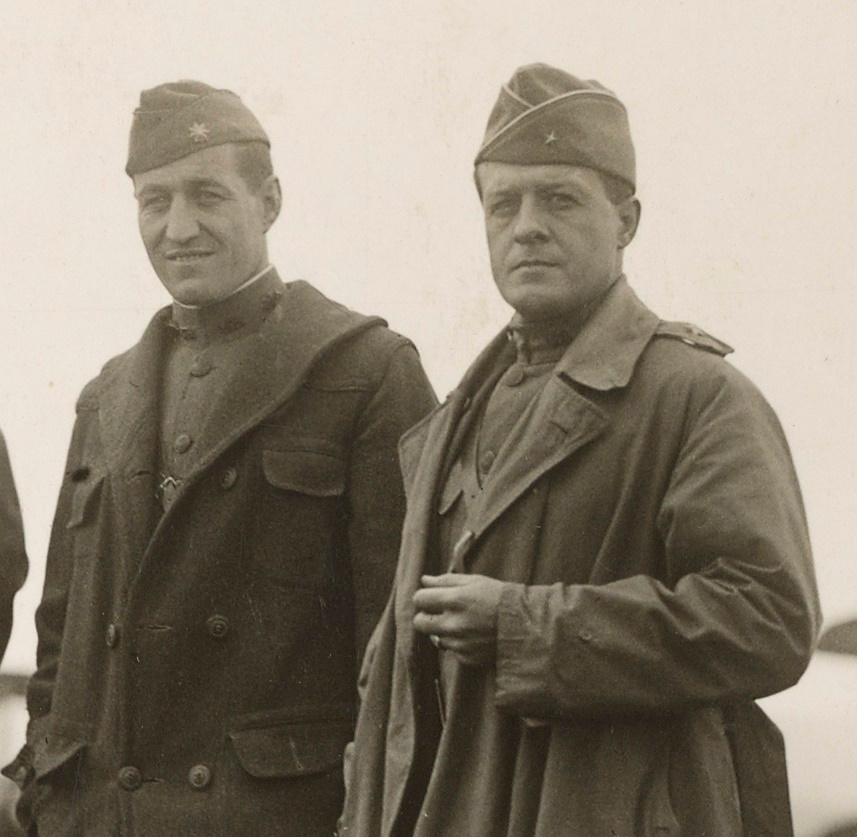
Then Major Ralph Royce (left) with Brigadier General Benjamin Foulois in France 1918

Royce was posted to the 1st Aero Squadron, which was then serving on the Mexican border in support of the Pancho Villa Expedition. He briefly commanded the squadron in March 1917, before being promoted to captain in May 1917. In August 1917, he assumed command of the squadron again, taking it to the Western Front. There, he was promoted to major in June 1918 and lieutenant colonel in August as commander of the 1st Observation Group.

For his service in France, he was awarded the Croix de Guerre with the citation: "Commanding the 1st American Observation Escadrille, he insisted on making the first reconnaissance above the enemy lines himself. Gives to his pilots generally an example of admirable dash and intrepidity."

== Between the wars ==
Royce experienced the chaotic ups and downs in rank common to Regular officers in 1920, when the National Defense Act of 1920 reorganized the military. He first reverted to his permanent rank of captain of Infantry 1 March 1920 when his temporary ranks expired. On 1 July 1920, when the Air Service became a combatant arm of the line, he formally transferred to the branch, with promotion to major by virtue of a provision in the Act that allowed officers who earned their rank in service with the AEF to retain it. On 18 December 1922 he was discharged when Congress set a new ceiling on the number of majors authorized the Air Service, and reappointed as a captain, then promoted again to major on 11 July 1923.

From 1920 to 1926 he was commanding officer of the primary flying school at Carlstrom Field, Arcadia, Florida. In 1926 he was transferred to Langley for duty as a student at the Air Corps Tactical School. He then became commandant of Brooks Field, San Antonio, Texas. He then went to Fort Leavenworth, Kansas as a student in the Command and General Staff College. From 1928 to 1930, he commanded the 1st Pursuit Group at Selfridge Field. Michigan.

In January 1930 Royce commanded the 1st Pursuit Group in a flight across the northern United States from Selfridge Field to Spokane, Washington and back in what became known as the "Arctic Patrol" flight, in order to put "pursuit tactics to the acid test under extremely rigorous weather conditions, and to afford a very broad opportunity for testing flying equipment in zero temperatures". For this, Royce won the Mackay Trophy.

In July and August 1934, he piloted one of ten Martin B-10 bombers from Washington, DC to Fairbanks, Alaska and back, as Operations Officer for an expedition led by Henry H. Arnold, for which Arnold won the Mackay trophy. In February 1935 he led the 1st Pursuit Group in a series of a cold weather flights through the northern states where the airmen encountered blizzards, and subzero temperatures. He attended the Army War College from 1933 to 1934, after which he resumed command of the 1st Pursuit Group. He was promoted to lieutenant colonel in 1935. From 1937 to 1939, he served as Air Officer of the Philippine Department. On returning to the United States in 1939 he assumed command of the 7th Bombardment Group at Hamilton Field CA.

== World War II ==
Royce was promoted to colonel on 1 March 1940. He assumed command of the 20th Bombardment Wing at Fort Douglas, Utah in March 1941 and was promoted to brigadier general in April. In May 1941 he became Assistant Military Attaché at the American Embassy in London. In July 1941 he became Military Attaché for Air.

=== Special mission in the Philippines ===
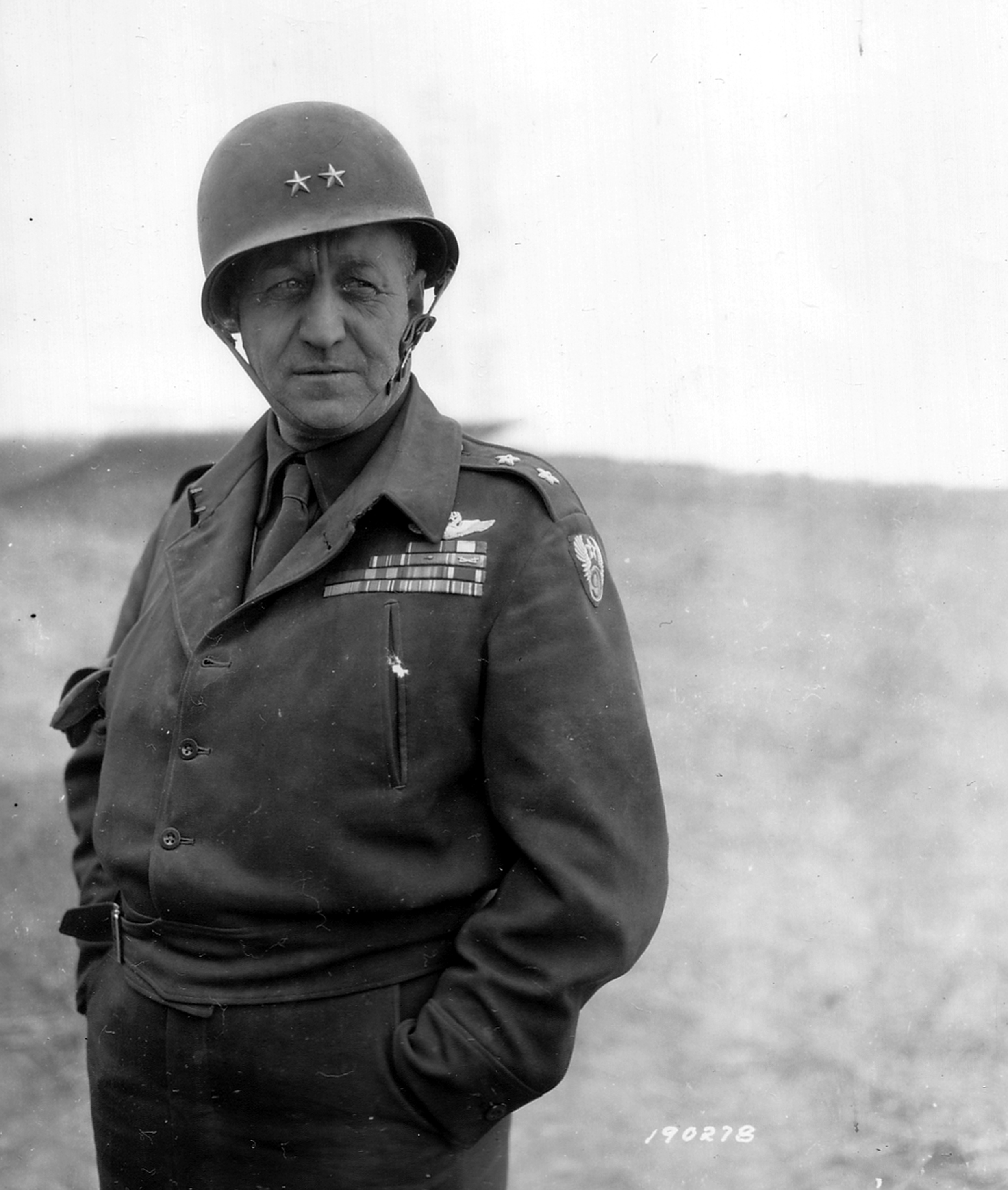
Major General Ralph Royce during World War II

In January 1942, Royce was posted to Australia as Chief of the Air Staff, US Army Forces in Australia (USAFIA). In March 1942, the commander of US Forces in the Philippines, Lieutenant General Jonathan Wainwright, asked that a squadron of bombers be sent to the Philippines to break the Japanese blockade and allow supplies to be moved from Cebu to Corregidor. A conference was held in Melbourne on 7 April and plans were drawn up. Royce commanded the mission in person, which consisted of ten B-25 Mitchell medium bombers of the 3rd Bomb Group and three B-17 Flying Fortress heavy bombers of the 19th Bomb Group.

The force took off from Darwin on 11 April and flew 1,500 miles (2,400 km) to Del Monte Airfield on Mindanao. All the planes arrived safely and the B-25s were dispersed to concealed P-40 Warhawk airstrips at Valencia and Maramag. Royce inexplicably declined to disperse the B-17s, and one was damaged by an air attack on Del Monte during the subsequent mission after it had been left behind for repairs. After the other two B-17s returned from the mission, they too were caught in the open on the ground and damaged, while the original bomber was destroyed. During missions on 12 and 13 April, the force carried out a series of small air strikes against shipping and harbor facilities at Cebu, the harbor and airstrips at Davao, and Nichols Field on Luzon, the B-17s flying only two sorties while the B-25s conducted more than twenty. They then returned safely to Australia with evacuees, including U.S. Navy Lieutenant John D. Bulkeley. For leading the mission, Royce was awarded the Distinguished Service Cross.

=== Subsequent war service ===
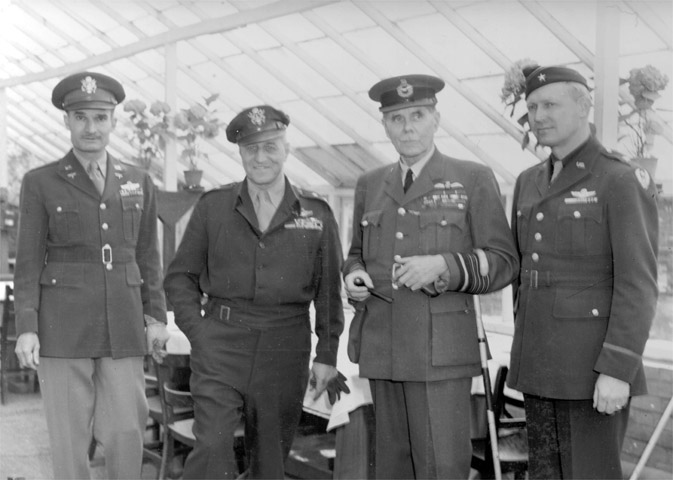
A meeting, less than a month before the Normandy landings, of (from left to right) Brigadier General Richard C. Sanders, CG of the 100th Fighter Wing; Major General Ralph Royce, then Deputy Chief of Staff for the Ninth Air Force; Lord Trenchard, Marshal of the Royal Air Force; Brigadier General Otto P. Weyland, CG of the XIX TAC

In the May 1942 organization of South West Pacific Area, Royce became senior air staff officer, Allied Air Forces. He was promoted to major general in June 1942. Royce returned to the United States in September 1942 and assumed command of the South Eastern Training Center at Maxwell Field in Montgomery, Alabama. He commanded the First Air Force from April to September 1943.

From September 1943 to March 1944, he was commander of U.S. Army Forces in the Middle East. In March 1944, Royce returned to the United Kingdom as Deputy Commander of the Ninth Air Force to Lieutenant General Lewis H. Brereton and later Major General Hoyt Vandenberg. He commanded the First Tactical Air Force (Provisional) from October 1944 to January 1945, operating in support of the Sixth United States Army Group. After the bombing of the French city of Royan on 5 January 1945, where about 500 French civilians were killed and about 1000 wounded because of inadequate intelligence transferred to RAF, Ralph Royce was removed from the European theater of operations by Supreme Allied Commander Dwight D. Eisenhower. He then commanded the Personnel Distribution Command at Louisville, Kentucky until August 1945. Royce was married again in Detroit in February 1945, this time to Agnes Berges an ex-Manhattan hotel executive and overseas Red Cross worker.

== Post-war ==
Royce received a disability retirement from the military in July 1946. He died of leukemia on 7 August 1965 at the Homestead Air Force Base Hospital in Miami-Dade County, Florida.

== Bibliography ==
- Ancell, R. Manning; Miller, Christine (1996), The Biographical Dictionary of World War II Generals and Flag Officers: The US Armed Forces, Westport, Connecticut: Greenwood Press, p. 438, ISBN 0-313-29546-8
- Bartsch, William H. (1992), Doomed From the Star: American Pursuit Pilots in the Philippines, 1941-1942, College Station, Texas: Texas A&M University Press, ISBN 0-89096-679-6
- Brett, George H. (October 1947). "The MacArthur I knew". True Magazine.
- Craven, Wesley Frank; Cate, James Lea, eds. (1948), "Vol. I, Plans and Early Operations", The Army Air Forces in World War II, University of Chicago Press
- Fogerty, Dr Robert O. (1953), Biographical data on Air Force General Officers (PDF), Maxwell Air Force Base, Alabama: Air University, archived from the original (PDF) on 13 March 2013
