= Otto P. Weyland =

United States Air Force general

Otto Paul Weyland
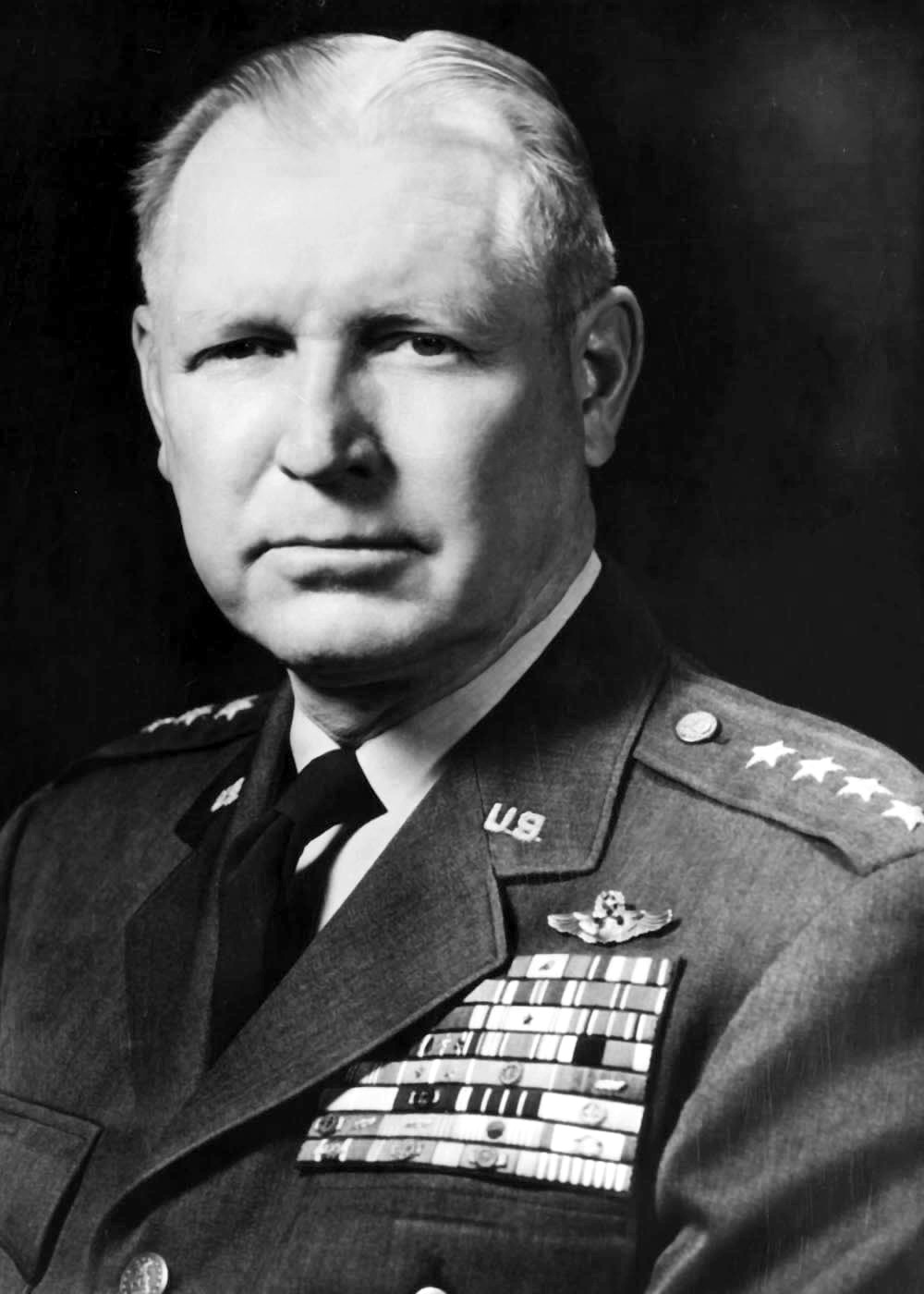
- General Otto P. Weyland
- Born: January 27, 1903; Riverside, California
- Died: September 2, 1979 (aged 76); San Antonio, Texas
- Military career
- Allegiance: United States of America
- Branch: United States Air Force
- Service years: 1923 - 1959
- Rank: General
- Nickname: Opie
- Commands: Tactical Air Command; Far East Air Forces; XIX Tactical Air Command; 84th Fighter Wing
- Conflicts: World War II; Cold War; Korean War
- Awards: Distinguished Service Medal; Silver Star; Distinguished Flying Cross; Legion of Merit; Bronze Star; Air Medal; Order of the British Empire

Otto Paul Weyland (January 27, 1903 – September 2, 1979) was a United States Air Force (USAF) general and the post-World War II Commander of Far East Air Forces during the Korean War and of Tactical Air Command.

== Early life ==
His family moved to Texas when he was a youth. He went to high school at Taft, Sinton, and Hempstead, Texas. From 1919 to 1923, he attended Texas A&M University, graduating with a bachelor of science degree in mechanical engineering, and getting his commission in the United States Army Air Service.

== Early military career ==
He took flying training at Brooks and Kelly Fields, Texas, with initial duty with the 12th Observation Squadron at Fort Sam Houston, Texas. He returned to Kelly Field to teach flying. Promoted to first lieutenant in June 1930, he went to Hawaii as commanding officer of the 4th Observation Squadron at Luke Field. He returned to Kelly Field in November 1934 as instructor and in 1935 became chief of the Observation Section, with promotion to captain that March. Weyland attended both the Air Corps Tactical School at Maxwell Field, Alabama, and the Command and General Staff School at Fort Leavenworth, Kansas, with next duty in Washington in June 1939 as assistant to the chief of Aviation Division in the National Guard Bureau.

== World War II ==
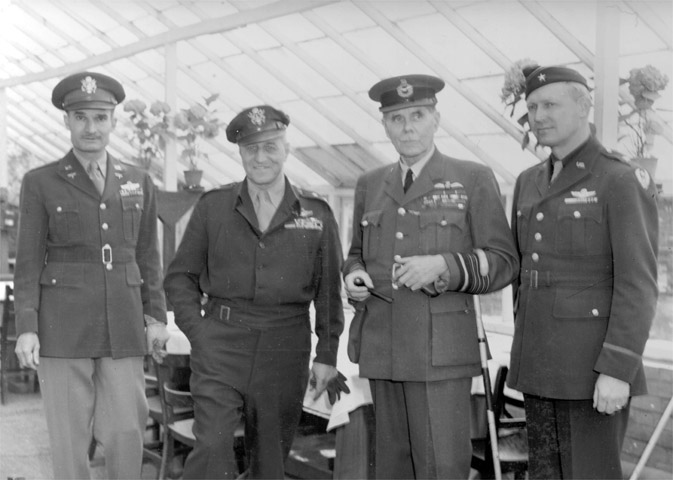
A meeting, less than a month before the Normandy landings, of (from left to right) Brigadier General Richard C. Sanders, CG of the 100th Fighter Wing; Major General Ralph Royce, then Deputy Chief of Staff for the Ninth Air Force; Lord Trenchard, Marshal of the Royal Air Force; Brigadier General Otto P. Weyland, CG of the XIX TAC.

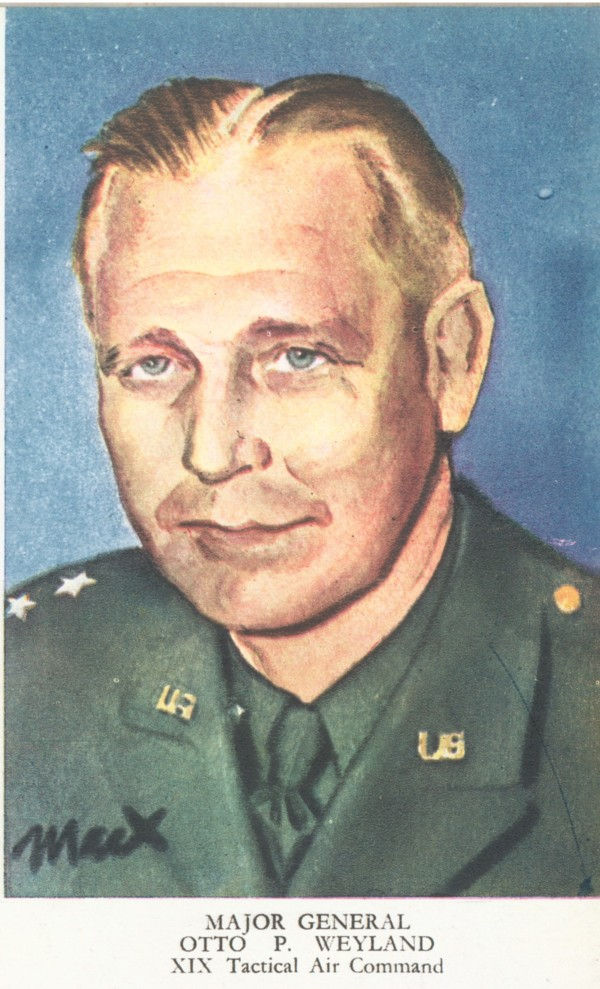
Watercolor portrait of Major General Otto P. Weyland, 9th Air Force, United States Army Air Force 1945

He was promoted to major in March 1940 and to lieutenant colonel in December 1941, the latter coming while he was in the Panama Canal Zone as commanding officer of the 16th Pursuit Group and chief of staff of the 6th Air Force. Weyland was promoted to colonel in March 1942 and returned to Washington in June as deputy director of air support at Headquarters United States Army Air Forces (USAAF).

He was advanced to brigadier general in September 1943 and in November went to Europe as commanding general of the 84th Fighter Wing. Four months later he became commanding general of the XIX Tactical Air Command. Under him this combat unit gained fame for its close air support of General George Patton's U.S. Third Army in the successful movement across France in August 1944 and Germany in the spring of 1945. By January 1945 Weyland had become a major general and finished the air war against Germany, participating in six major campaigns and called by Patton "the best damn general in the Air Corps."

Returning to the United States in September 1945, Weyland served for nine months as Assistant Commandant of the school at Fort Leavenworth, Kansas, and in June 1946 went to Washington as Assistant Chief of Plans at Headquarters USAAF. He moved to Plans and Operations when the United States Air Force became a separate service in 1947. From February 1948 to July 1950, he served as Deputy Commandant of the National War College in Washington.

== Korea and retirement ==
In July 1950 he was briefly commanding general of Tactical Air Command (TAC) until going to Headquarters Far East Air Forces (FEAF) in Tokyo as vice commander for operations in the first full month of the Korean War. In April 1951, he returned to TAC and was promoted to lieutenant general.

In June 1951, he went back to Tokyo as commanding general of FEAF and the United Nations Air Forces when Lieutenant General George Stratemeyer had a heart attack. Weyland's widely recognized ability and experience in tactical warfare was demonstrated in ten major campaigns in Korea. He was promoted to four-star general on July 5, 1952. He stayed in Japan to help that nation reorganize its air defense forces and aircraft industry, and became known as the "father of the new Japanese air force."

Weyland returned to the United States in May 1954 to serve as Commanding General of TAC. He retired from the United States Air Force on July 31, 1959. He died on September 2, 1979.

== Awards and decorations ==
During his career, he earned many decorations, including two Distinguished Service Medals, the Silver Star, the Distinguished Flying Cross (for personally leading a bomber formation against important Communist targets in North Korea when weather prevented fighter cover and escort), the Legion of Merit, Bronze Star, and Air Medal, as well as awards from Great Britain (Commander, Order of the British Empire—for air cover of the Normandy Invasion), France, Luxembourg, Belgium, Korea, Thailand, the Philippines, Japan and Brazil.

- Distinguished Service Medal with oak leaf cluster
- Silver Star
- Legion of Merit
- Distinguished Flying Cross
- Bronze Star
- Air Medal

== See also ==
- List of commanders of Tactical Air Command
