= Jerome F. O'Malley =

United States Air Force general

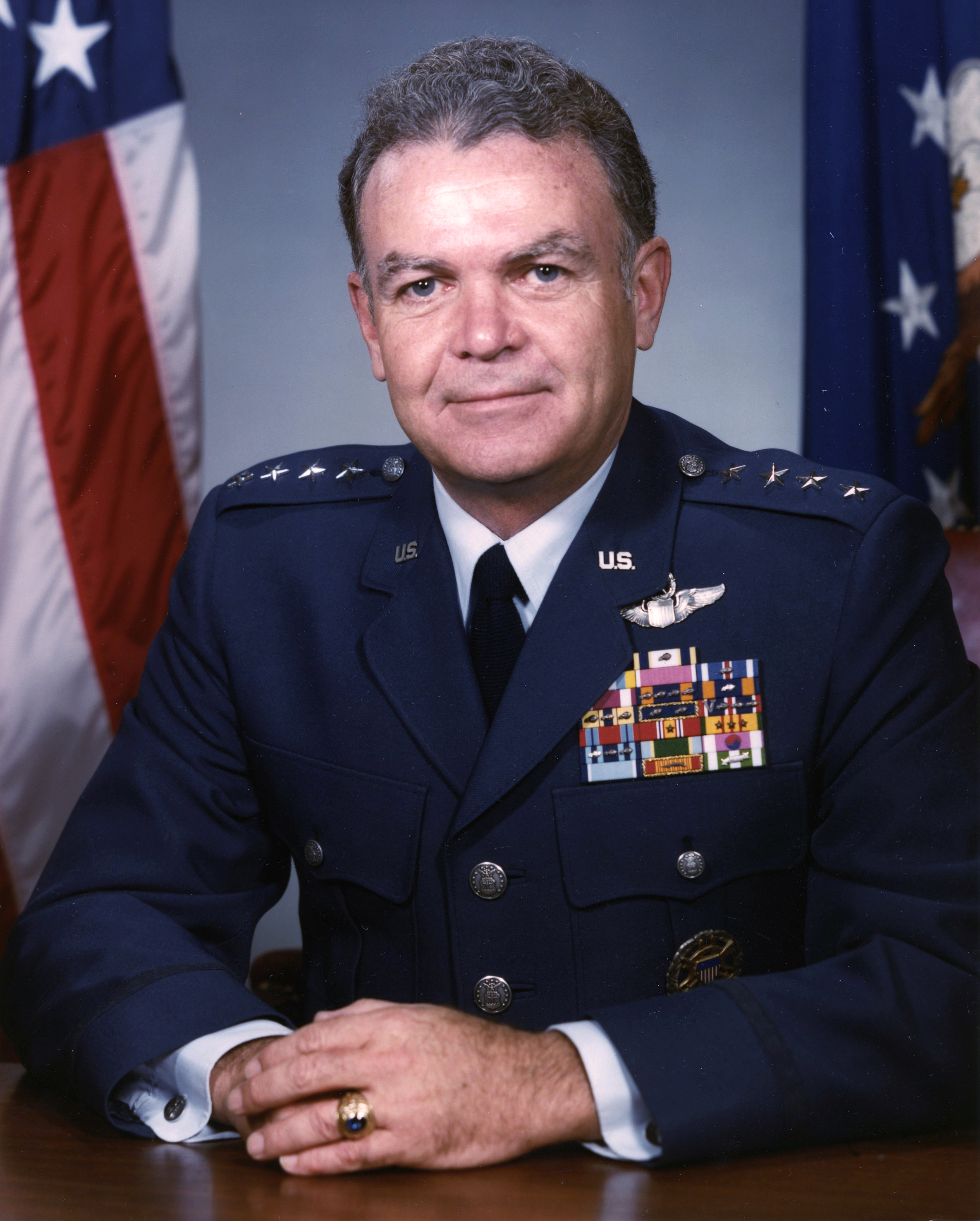
- General Jerome F. O'Malley
- Born: February 25, 1932; Carbondale, Pennsylvania
- Died: April 20, 1985 (aged 53); Pittston Township, Pennsylvania
- Burial place: Arlington National Cemetery
- Military career
- Allegiance: United States
- Branch: United States Air Force
- Service years: 1953–1985
- Rank: General
- Nickname: Jerry
- Commands: 460th Tactical Reconnaissance Wing; 432nd Tactical Reconnaissance Wing; 9th Strategic Reconnaissance Wing; 22nd Bomb Wing; Tactical Air Command; Pacific Air Forces
- Conflicts: Vietnam War
- Awards: Air Force Distinguished Service Medal (2); Defense Superior Service Medal; Legion of Merit; Distinguished Flying Cross (2); Meritorious Service Medal; Air Medal (10)

General Jerome Francis O'Malley (February 25, 1932 – April 20, 1985) was a United States Air Force four-star general who served as Vice Chief of Staff, U.S. Air Force (VCSAF) from 1982 to 1983; Commander in Chief, Pacific Air Forces (CINCPACAF) from 1983 to 1984; and Commander, Tactical Air Command (COMTAC) from 1984 to 1985. He died in an airplane crash while still in command of Tactical Air Command in 1985.

== Biography ==
O'Malley was born in Carbondale, Pennsylvania, and graduated from St. Rose Parochial School in 1949. Three years prior he made headlines after winning the Scranton, Pennsylvania Soap Box Derby and making it to the second round at the 9th All-American in Akron, Ohio. He graduated from the United States Military Academy, West Point, New York, in 1953 with a bachelor of science degree in military science and a commission as a second lieutenant in the U.S. Air Force. O'Malley completed the Air Command and Staff College at Maxwell Air Force Base, Alabama, and concurrently earned a master's degree in business administration from The George Washington University, Washington, D.C., in 1965, and graduated from the Naval War College, Newport, Rhode Island, in 1970.

After receiving his pilot wings in August 1954 at Bryan Air Force Base, Texas, O'Malley received jet training in F-86 Sabrejets at Perrin Air Force Base, Texas. station functioned as a Ground-Control Intercept (GCI) and warning station and could not accommodate pilot training.

In January 1955 he was assigned as an air training officer at the U.S. Air Force Academy, then located at Lowry Air Force Base, Colorado. He attended B-47 transition training at McConnell Air Force Base, Kansas, from December 1957 to February 1958, and was then assigned as a B-47 pilot with the 529th Bombardment Squadron at Plattsburgh Air Force Base, New York. From June 1960 to August 1964, O'Malley served as an aide to General Hunter Harris, who was Eighth Air Force commander at Westover Air Force Base, Massachusetts, and then vice commander in chief, Strategic Air Command, Offutt Air Force Base, Nebraska.

Following graduation with distinction from the Air Command and Staff College in June 1965, O'Malley served as a pilot with the 9th Strategic Reconnaissance Wing, Beale Air Force Base, California. While there he flew the first operational mission of the SR-71. In July 1969 he entered the Naval War College.

From July 1970 to April 1971, he was director of operations for the 67th Tactical Reconnaissance Wing, Mountain Home Air Force Base, Idaho, and flew RF-4Cs. O'Malley then left for Southeast Asia and served as vice commander and later commander of the 460th Tactical Reconnaissance Wing at Tan Son Nhut Air Base, Republic of Vietnam. In September 1971 he was assigned as vice commander of the 432d Tactical Reconnaissance Wing, Udorn Royal Thai Air Force Base, Thailand. He flew 116 combat missions in F-4D's and RF-4Cs.

He commanded the 9th Strategic Reconnaissance Wing at Beale Air Force Base from May 1972 to May 1973. He was then named commander of the 22d Bombardment Wing, March Air Force Base, California, and later served as chief of staff for Fifteenth Air Force, also located at March Air Force Base. He was then assigned as assistant deputy chief of staff for plans at SAC headquarters, Offutt Air Force Base, from July 1974 to June 1975, when he was named deputy chief of staff for operations plans.

In January 1977 he moved to Washington, D.C., for duty as vice director for operations, Operations Directorate, Joint Staff, Organization of the Joint Chiefs of Staff. O'Malley served as assistant deputy chief of staff, operations, plans and readiness at U.S. Air Force headquarters, from May 1979 to August 1980, when he became deputy chief of staff for plans and operations. He was appointed vice chief of staff of the U.S. Air Force in June 1982 and in October 1983 was named commander in chief of the Pacific Air Forces, Hickam Air Force Base, Hawaii. He assumed command of Tactical Air Command in September 1984.

General O'Malley died on April 20, 1985, with his wife Diane when the CT-39 Sabreliner they were in experienced hydraulic failure at the Wilkes-Barre Scranton International Airport. Also killed in the accident were Capt. Harry L. Haugh, the pilot; Sgt. Robert A. Eberflus, the crew chief and Lt. Col. Lester R. Newton, the co-pilot. Lt Col Newton had given his seat in the cockpit to General O’Malley and was seated in the cabin with Mrs. O’Malley. At the time of General O'Malley's death, General Robert D. Russ assumed command of the Tactical Air Command.

He was buried with full military honors at Arlington National Cemetery.

== Awards and honors ==
O'Malley was a command pilot with more than 5,000 flying hours. His military decorations and awards included:

United States Air Force Command Pilot Badge
Air Force Distinguished Service Medal with bronze oak leaf cluster		Defense Superior Service Medal
Legion of Merit	Distinguished Flying Cross with bronze oak leaf cluster	Meritorious Service Medal
Air Medal w/with one silver and three bronze oak leaf clusters	Air Medal (second ribbon required for accouterment spacing)	Air Force Commendation Medal with three bronze oak leaf clusters
Air Force Presidential Unit Citation with two bronze oak leaf clusters	Air Force Outstanding Unit Award with Valor device and three bronze oak leaf clusters	Combat Readiness Medal
National Defense Service Medal with service star	Vietnam Service Medal with three bronze campaign stars	Air Force Longevity Service Award with one silver and two bronze oak leaf clusters
Small Arms Expert Marksmanship Ribbon	Air Force Training Ribbon	South Korean Order of National Security Merit; Tongil Medal
Republic of Vietnam Air Service Medal; Honor Class	Republic of Vietnam Gallantry Cross Unit Citation	Republic of Vietnam Campaign Medal

== See also ==
- List of commanders of Tactical Air Command
