= List of commanders of Tactical Air Command =

Tactical Air Command
- Shield of Tactical Air Command
- Active: 21 March 1946 – 1 June 1992 (46 years)
- Country: United States of America
- Branch: United States Army Air Forces (21 March 1946 – 18 September 1947); United States Air Force (18 September 1947–1 June 1992)
- Type: Major Command
- Headquarters: Langley AFB, Virginia
- Motto: Vigilance for Freedom
- Anniversaries: 21 March 1946 - Founding
- Engagements: European Theater of World War II; Berlin airlift; Cold War

The Commander, Tactical Air Command was the most senior officer and head of the United States Air Force command called TAC.

== List of Commanders of Tactical Air Command ==
#	Photo	Name	Dates	Notes
11		John M. Loh	1991-1992	
10		Robert D. Russ	1985-1991	
9		Jerome F. O'Malley	1984-1985	
8		Wilbur L. Creech	1978-1984	
7		Robert J. Dixon	1973-1978	
6		William W. Momyer	1968-1973	
5		Gabriel P. Disosway	1965-1968	
4		Walter C. Sweeney, Jr.	1961-1965	
3		Frank F. Everest	1959-1961	
2		Otto P. Weyland	1954-1959	
1		John K. Cannon	1951-1954	

== List of Vice Commanders of Tactical Air Command ==
#	Photo	Name	Dates	Notes
1		Glenn O. Barcus	January 1951 – May 1951	Designated as Deputy Commander
2		Otto P. Weyland	May 1951 – 1952	Designated as Deputy Commander
3		Frank F. Everest	May 1952 – April 1953	Designated as Deputy Commander
4		Earl W. Barnes	April 1953 – February 1956	Designated as Deputy Commander
5		William Eckert	July 1956 – February 1960	
6		Jacob E. Smart	January 1960 – August 1961	
7		Gabriel P. Disosway	1961 – November 1962	
8		Charles B. Westover	November 1962 – August 1965	
9		Albert P. Clark	August 1965 – August 1968	
10		Gordon M. Graham	August 1968 – February 1970	
11		Jay T. Robbins	February 1970 - August 1972	
12		Dale S. Sweat	August 1972 – September 1974	
13		Robert Hails	August 1974 – February 1975	
14		Sanford K. Moats	September 1975 – July 1977	
15		James A. Knight Jr.	July 1977 – March 1979	
16		Robert C. Mathis	March 1979 – March 1980	
17		Philip C. Gast	March 1980 – July 1980	
18		Thomas H. McMullen	July 1980 – August 1982	
19		Robert D. Russ	October 1982 – July 1983	
20		Robert E. Kelley	July 1983 – September 1986	
21		James R. Brown	October 1986 – July 1988	
22		Jimmie V. Adams	August 1988 – March 1989	
23		Henry Viccellio Jr.	May 1989 – September 1989	
24		Joseph W. Ashy	September 1989 – June 1990	
25		Thomas A. Baker	July 1990 – May 1991	
26		Donald Snyder	May 1991 – July 1992	

== See also ==
- List of United States Air Force four-star generals
- List of commanders-in-chief of the Strategic Air Command
- List of commanders of USAFE
