= First Tactical Air Force (Provisional) =

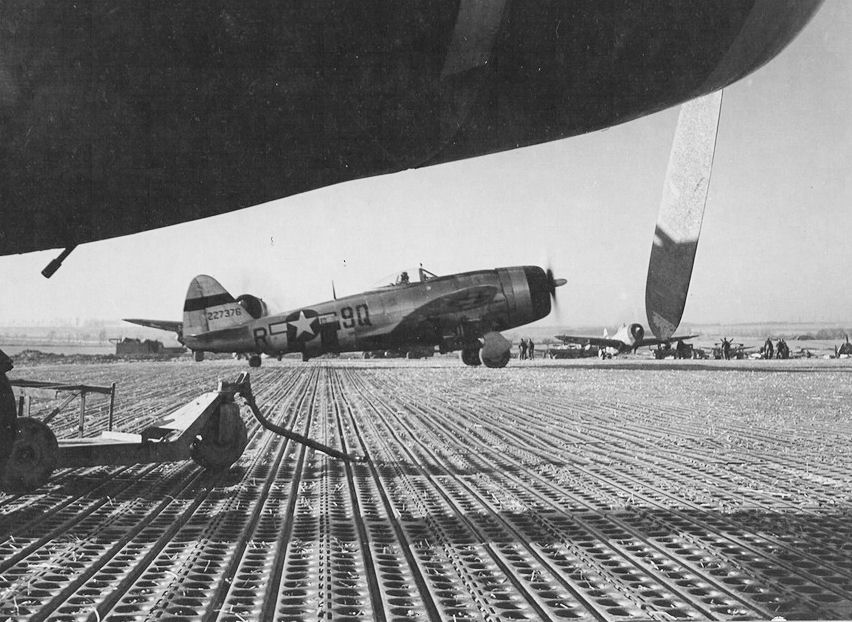
- P-47 Thunderbolts of the 371st Fighter Group at Tantonville Airfield
- Active: 1944–1945
- Countries: United States, France
- Branch: Air Force
- Role: Control of tactical air forces
- Part of: Supreme Headquarters Allied Expeditionary Force
- Engagements: European Theater of Operations

Commanders
- Commander Oct 1944-Jan 1945: Major General Ralph Royce
- Jan 1945-Feb 1945: Brigadier General Gordon P. Saville
- Feb 1945-May 1945: Brigadier General Robert M. Webster

First Tactical Air Force (Provisional) was a U.S.-French multinational air formation active in 1944-45. It was organized in the fall of 1944 to provide air support to the Sixth Army Group. Its operations concentrated on the reduction of the Colmar Pocket on the east side of the Rhine River. After the success of Operation Cheerful, it moved into southern Germany, continuing operations against German forces there. Following V-E Day, it was discontinued and its elements returned to their assigned headquarters.

== History ==
=== Background ===
In August 1944, the Allies landed in the French Riviera in Operation Dragoon. As the United States Seventh Army and the French Army B pursued the German 19th Army northward up the Rhone Valley, they were combined into the Sixth Army Group. However, Allied operations were hindered by a lack of airpower. Supreme Headquarters Allied Expeditionary Forces (SHAEF) had not created a permanent air organization to support Operation Dragoon and the advance northward to link with Allied forces advancing through northern France. Air support for Dragoon was provided by elements of Ninth Air Force and Mediterranean Allied Air Forces, but most of these units had been withdrawn to their permanent commands to resume normal operations. The Allies had not made plans for a permanent air establishment to support Sixth Army Group. In October 1944, the remaining American and French air units were combined into a single air force, although only on a provisional basis.

=== Operations ===
The First Tactical Air Force (Provisional) (1 TAF) was formed at Vittel, France, drawing its cadre from XII Tactical Air Command. It was assigned four subordinate operational commands; one American, one combined American and French, and two entirely French. At the end of January 1945, 1 TAF strength included just over 21,000 Americans and 15,500 French. (Note: These numbers do not include personnel in the Western French Air Force, whose number was reported as "unknown." Koontz, p. 29, note 18.) Due to competing needs for aircraft by other commands, most assigned units were understrength.

==== Western French Air Force ====
The Western French Air Force (Forces Aeriennes de l'Atlantique [FAA] ) was attached to 1TAF, but operated under the control of the French Ministry of War. It operated a motley assembly of obsolete French, American and British planes along with German aircraft that were either captured or found in the French factories contracted to make them. From its stations at Cognac and Bordeaux, the Western French Air Force (FAA) patrolled the Atlantic coast of France and monitored the coastal 'pockets' still occupied by German forces. Due to competing needs for aircraft by other commands, most assigned units were understrength. 1 TAF's connection was primarily for logistic support.

Plans were drawn up for Operation Independence to capture these German occupied cities, but were delayed by operations in the Battle of the Bulge. The force participated in Operation Venerable, the final attacks which eliminated some of these pockets of resistance toward the end of the war in April 1945.

==== Operation Northwind ====
In late December 1944, the German 19th Army launched Operation Northwind (Unternehmen Nordwind), intended to support German operations in the Battle of the Bulge. Northwind was designed to break through US Seventh Army's lines and capture Strasbourg. During the operation, the Luftwaffe was only able to provide air support once or twice a week, and most of its formations were intercepted by Allied fighters and forced to turn back without completing their mission. Northwind ended with the gain of little on the ground, and the loss of additional German combat aircraft available for defense of the Upper Rhine. With the exception, of the first Messerschmitt Me 262s to appear in the area, German fighters were reluctant to engage. This, in turned enabled 1 TAF's fighter-bombers to concentrate on interdiction, rather than conducting fighter sweeps to engage enemy aircraft. Sweeps were assigned to French Supermarine Spitfires, which had only a limited ground attack capability.

==== Operation Cheerful ====
The German 19th Army had not retreated into Germany, but had remained on the left bank of the Rhine River in the Brückekopf Elsaß, called by the Allies, the Colmar Pocket. In early January 1945, preparations began for Operation Cheerful, to eject the Germans from this bridgehead. 1 TAF had conducted attacks against the railroad bridge over the Rhine between Breisach, Germany and Neuf-Brisach, France since October 1944 with little success. Most of these operations were conducted by French Martin B-26 Marauder units. (Note: The French First Army had been assigned the main responsibility for the Colmar Pocket. Support for this army was usually assigned to French Air Force elements. Koontz, p. 41.) This bridge was one of only two railroad bridges across the Rhine to the Colmar Pocket, with the other at Neuenburg am Rhein. Both were critical lines of communication for the Germans, who had established heavy anti-aircraft defenses around them and concentrated rapid repair facilities nearby. Not only air defenses, but winter weather limited 1 TAF's ability to attack the bridges. A planned January strike on the Breisach bridge by heavy bombers of Eighth Air Force was totally frustrated by cloud cover over the bridge.

The 1 TAF air plan for Operation Cheerful, however, called on 1TAF's medium bombers and fighter-bombers to focus on air support, rather than interdiction, with hopes that forces from Eighth and Ninth Air Forces would provide interdictory support. 1 TAF lacked the resources to perform both missions. Attacks on the Rhine bridges resulted in temporary blockages of vehicle traffic, but the railroad bridges remained in operation. German resupply was, however, forced to operate under cover of darkness. Although combat aircraft available to 1 TAF were limited and the readiness rate of French bombers and fighters was low, Luftwaffe losses during the drive up the Rhone River were heavy, and 1 TAF enjoyed air superiority in its area and its intelligence staff estimated that no more than 45 fighters were available to the enemy at any given time.

1 TAF's superiority made German attempts to maneuver by vehicle or on foot during daylight hours especially risky. The greatest risk to its fighter-bombers and medium bombers was from flak, with nearly 140 batteries of IV Flak Corps defending the area. However, weather during the operation was a major factor in limiting 1 TAF's ability to use this supremacy, particularly for reconnaissance missions. 64th Fighter Wing reported only 18 days from mid January to the end of March 1945 with "operational flying weather," but 27 days of "non operational" weather. (Note: The remaining 33 days were reported as having weather permitting limited operational capability. Koontz, p. 59.) Between 20 January and 9 February, the 42nd Bombardment Wing was only able to fly any sorties on six days. The weather did not start to clear until Operation Cheerful had ended and the wing's role in the operation was negligible.

1 TAF's Republic P-47 Thunderbolt units were able to strike marshalling yards, rail and road junctions and bridges on the German side of the Rhine to prevent reinforcements into the Colmar Pocket, or later an orderly retreat out of it. However, most Thunderbolt missions were armed reconnaissance, striking targets located in an assigned patrol area, or requested by ground controllers. On days with good weather, they would fly multiple sorties. Individual sorties frequently combined interdiction, armed reconnaissance, and close air support, striking fortified positions and troop concentrations. As the operation began, fighter strikes were diverted to the north of the pocket, where the 12th Armored Division was under heavy counterattack after an attempt to eliminate German forces there. Perhaps the most successful close air support mission of the campaign occurred on 26 January, when Thunderbolts from the 50th Fighter Group were able to take off during a brief weather break and support the 3rd Infantry Division, enabling it to repel German counterattacks near the Colmar Canal.

As German forces began to retreat from the pocket in early February and as weather cleared, American and French fighters effectively attacked disorganized columns, inflicting severe damage on rail cars, vehicles and personnel. Meanwhile, 1 TAF's medium bombers struck supply and ammunition depots.

The Breisach railroad bridge was finally destroyed on 5 February, but by German engineers, to prevent its use by Allied forces as the Germans retreated across the Rhine. The Neuenburg bridge continued in use during the German retreat, but was used only at night, which limited 1 TAF operations against these forces to what the nine Bristol Beaufighters of the 415th Night Fighter Squadron were able to do. Other elements of 1 TAF concentrated on targets on the German side of the Rhine to prevent the Germans from reorganizing the elements they had been able to withdraw and pounding the few forces left in what remained of the Colmar Pocket. All resistance on French soil had ended by 9 February

==== Operation Floorlamp ====
In March, as planning began for Operation Floorlamp, which was intended to prevent the German Nineteenth Army from moving to safer locations in the Black Forest or linking up with forces further north, General Saville was replaced in command by Brigadier General Robert M. Webster. within a few weeks, few German forces were left south of Offenburg. Following the end of this operation 1 TAF continued strikes deeper into the Black Forest area, striking supply depots, barracks and motor transport to keep the German forces from reassembling as an effective combat force. 1 TAF began preparations for Operation Undertone. breaching the Siegfried Line and began moving its American combat elements to airfields in Germany. It was reinforced by the addition of two new fighter groups and support elements from Twelfth Air Force, although the 371st Fighter Group returned to Ninth Air Force control. 1 TAF headquarters relocated to Heidelberg, Germany in early April 1945

==== Final operations ====
1 TAF participated in Operation Clarion, The 1945 attacks to destroy the German transportation system and Operation Riptide, the final campaign against the German Air Force. After V-E Day, 1 TAF participated in Operation Eclipse, the disarmament of Germany. It was discontinued on 21 May 1945 and its elements reassigned to Ninth Air Force.

=== Command ===
Major General Ralph Royce, 1 TAF's first commander, attended a January 1945 meeting of senior air leaders of SHAEF at Versailles. At this meeting, he argued for support for Operation Cheerful, particularly for heavy bomber strikes against the key rail bridges across the Rhine. Air Chief Marshall Sir Arthur W. Tedder and Royce's commander, Lieutenant General Carl Spaatz made it clear to Royce that he would have to complete the operation with 1 TAF's assets alone. This culminated what Royce regarded as continuing disinterest by his superiors in the logistical, organizational and operational difficulties faced by 1 TAF. During planning for Operation Cheerful, he was of the opinion that the war in Europe was essentially over, and doubted Cheerful would contribute to its successful conclusion. As the operation was about to begin, he submitted his resignation. On his recommendation, Brigadier General Gordon P. Saville, commander of XII Tactical Air Command was promoted to replace him as Operation Cheerful began, while Royce returned to the United States.

== Lineage ==
- Organized on 20 October 1944
- Discontinued on 21 May 1945

=== Assignments ===
- United States Strategic Air Forces, 20 October 1944 – 21 May 1945

=== Components ===
- XII Tactical Air Command
  - 64th Fighter Wing
    - 50th Fighter Group
    - 324th Fighter Group
    - 358th Fighter Group
    - 371st Fighter Group
    - 415th Night Fighter Squadron
    - Provisional Reconnaissance Group
      - 34th Photographic Reconnaissance Squadron
      - 111th Tactical Reconnaissance Squadron
      - 162d Tactical Reconnaissance Squadron
  - 42nd Bombardment Wing
    - 17th Bombardment Group
    - 320th Bombardment Group
    - 31. Escadre de Bombardement Moyen
      - I/19 Groupe de Bombardement “Gascogne”
      - I/22 Groupe de Bombardement “Maroc”
      - II/20 Groupe de Bombardement “Bretagne”
    - 34. Escadre de Bombardement Moyen (Note: Administrative control of the two French bombardment groups remained with the Free French Air Force II Brigade de Bombardment. Koontz, p. 23.)
      - I/32 Groupe de Bombardement “Bourgogne”
      - II/52 Groupe de Bombardement “Franche-Comté”
      - II/63 Groupe de Bombardement “Sénégal”
- 71st Fighter Wing (from 24 October 1944) (Note: Wing headquarters only. Used to augment Headquarters, 1 TAF.)
- 27th Fighter Group (attached 21 February – 30 March 1945)
- 1er Corps Aerien Francais
  - 1. Escadre de Chasse
    - I/3 Groupe de Chasse “Corse”
    - I/7 Groupe de Chasse “Provence”
    - II/7 Groupe de Chasse “Nice”
  - 3. Escadre de Chasse
    - I/4 Groupe de Chasse “Navarre”
    - I/5 Groupe de Chasse “Champagne”
  - 4. Escadre de Chasse
    - II/3 Groupe de Chasse “Dauphiné”
    - II/5 Groupe de Chasse “La Fayette”
    - III/3 Groupe de Chasse “Ardennes”
  - I/33 Groupe de Reconnaissance “Belfort”
  - II/33 Groupe de Reconnaissance “Savoie”
- Western French Air Force [FAA: Forces Aeriennes de l'Atlantique]
- First Tactical Air Force Service Command (Provisional)
- First Tactical Air Force Engineer Command (Provisional)
  - 4 Engineer Aviation Battalions

=== Stations ===
- Vittel, France, 20 October 1944
- Heidelberg, Germany, 7 April 1945 – 21 May 1945

=== Aircraft ===
- Bristol Beaufighter
- Dewoitine D.520
- Douglas A-24 Banshee
- Lockheed F-5 Lightning
- Martin Maryland
- Martin B-26 Marauder
- North American F-6 Mustang
- Republic P-47 Thunderbolt
- Supermarine Spitfire (Note: In addition, the Western French Air Force flew a number of obsolescent aircraft. Koontz, p. 23.)>

=== Campaigns ===
Campaign Streamer	Campaign	Dates	Notes
	Rhineland	20 October 1944–21 March 1945	
	Ardennes-Alsace	16 December 1944–25 January 1945	
	Central Europe	20 October 1944–10 May 1945	(Note: This list is based on campaigns credited to XII Tactical Air Command, while it was the major American tactical element of 1 TAF.)

== See also ==
- Free French Air Forces
- List of Martin B-26 Marauder operators
- List of Supermarine Spitfire operators
