= Richard C. Sanders =

United States Air Force general

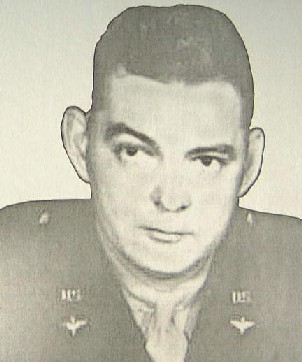
Richard C. Sanders.

Richard Condie Sanders (August 19, 1915 – September 20, 1976) was the youngest general officer in the history of the United States Air Force.

== Early career ==
Born in 1915, in Salt Lake City, Utah, he graduated from the University of Utah in 1937, with a Bachelor of Science degree, and was appointed a second lieutenant, Field Artillery Reserve on September 4, 1936, while still in college. He served on extended active duty from July 28, 1937, to June 30, 1938, and from July 5, 1938, to September 30, 1938. He then enlisted as a flying cadet on October 4, 1938, and, on completion of his training, was commissioned a second lieutenant, Air Reserve, on August 25, 1939. He was called to active duty the next day and was commissioned a second lieutenant, Air Corps, Regular Army, on July 1, 1940.

== Military service ==
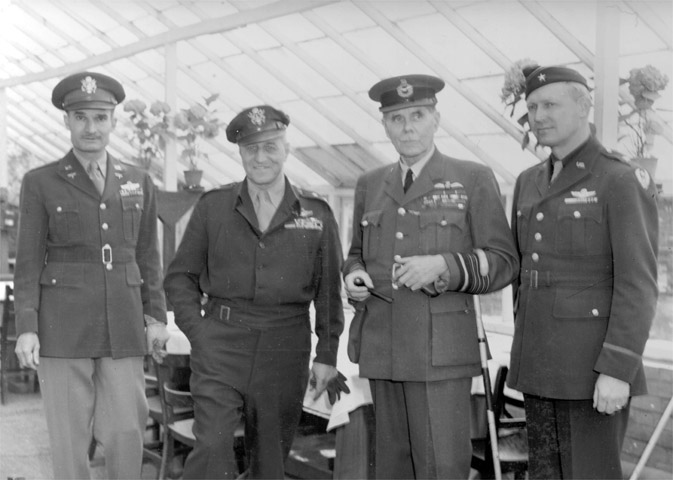
A meeting, less than a month before the Normandy landings, of (from left to right) Brigadier General Richard C. Sanders, CG of the 100th Fighter Wing; Major General Ralph Royce, then deputy chief of staff for the Ninth Air Force; Lord Trenchard, Marshal of the Royal Air Force; Brigadier General Otto P. Weyland, CG of the XIX TAC.

In July 1937, Sanders was ordered to Fort Lewis, Washington, serving with the 10th Field Artillery as a battalion reconnaissance and supply officer. He was with the 5th Infantry Brigade on Civilian Conservation Corps duty at Camp Soda Springs, Yakima, Washington, from July to September 1938, when he began his primary flying training at Randolph Field, Texas. Upon graduation from the Air Corps Primary Flying School, he went to Kelly Field, Texas, for advanced training, and upon graduation from the Air Corps Advanced Flying School in September 1939, was assigned to Mitchell Field, Long Island, N.Y., as assistant squadron adjutant, 18th Reconnaissance Squadron. He later served at Langley Field, Virginia, and Greenville Army Air Base, South Carolina, with the 18th Reconnaissance Squadron as intelligence and engineering officer. In February 1942, he was assigned to the Tenth Air Force at Patterson Field, Ohio, and Fort Myers, Florida.

Sanders was assigned to the IX Bomber Command in August 1942, and served overseas in the North African and European Theater of Operations as executive officer of a bombardment group, chief of staff, XX Bomber Command, and in November 1943, became commanding officer of a bombardment group. In January 1944, he was named administrative officer of the IX Bomber Command in the European Theater of Operations, promoted to brigadier general June 1944 (age 28), and in November 1944, was announced as chief of staff of the IX Bomber Command, which was then serving in France. In August 1945, he became commanding general of the 99th Bomber Group in Germany and three months later, was assigned to Headquarters Air Forces Personnel Distribution Command, Louisville, Kentucky. In March 1946, he was announced as commanding that installation. The same month his appointment as a brigadier general was terminated and he was administratively reduced to the rank of colonel. He retired on July 1, 1950.

== Decorations ==
Sanders was awarded the Distinguished Flying Cross in January 1943, for extraordinary achievement while participating in aerial flight against the enemy in the Middle East Theater. He was awarded an oak leaf cluster to this decoration in May 1943.

In January 1943, he was given the Air Medal and won two oak leaf clusters in January 1944. In January 1946, he was awarded the Distinguished Service Medal.

Sanders was also entitled to the American Defense Service Medal, American Campaign Medal, European-African-Middle Eastern Campaign Medal, World War II Victory Medal, Army of Occupation Medal and National Defense Service Medal.

== Dates of rank ==
Source - Official Register of the U.S. Army, 1947. pg. 979.

- 2nd Lieutenant - September 4, 1936
- 1st Lieutenant - October 10, 1941
- Captain - March 1, 1942
- Major - March 1, 1942
- Lieutenant Colonel - January 24, 1943
- Colonel - March 14, 1943
- Brigadier General - June 7, 1944 (Age 28 years, 9 months.)
- Appointment as brigadier general terminated, reverted to rank of colonel - March 31, 1946
