= Robert D. Russ =

United States Air Force general (1933–1997)

Robert Dale Russ
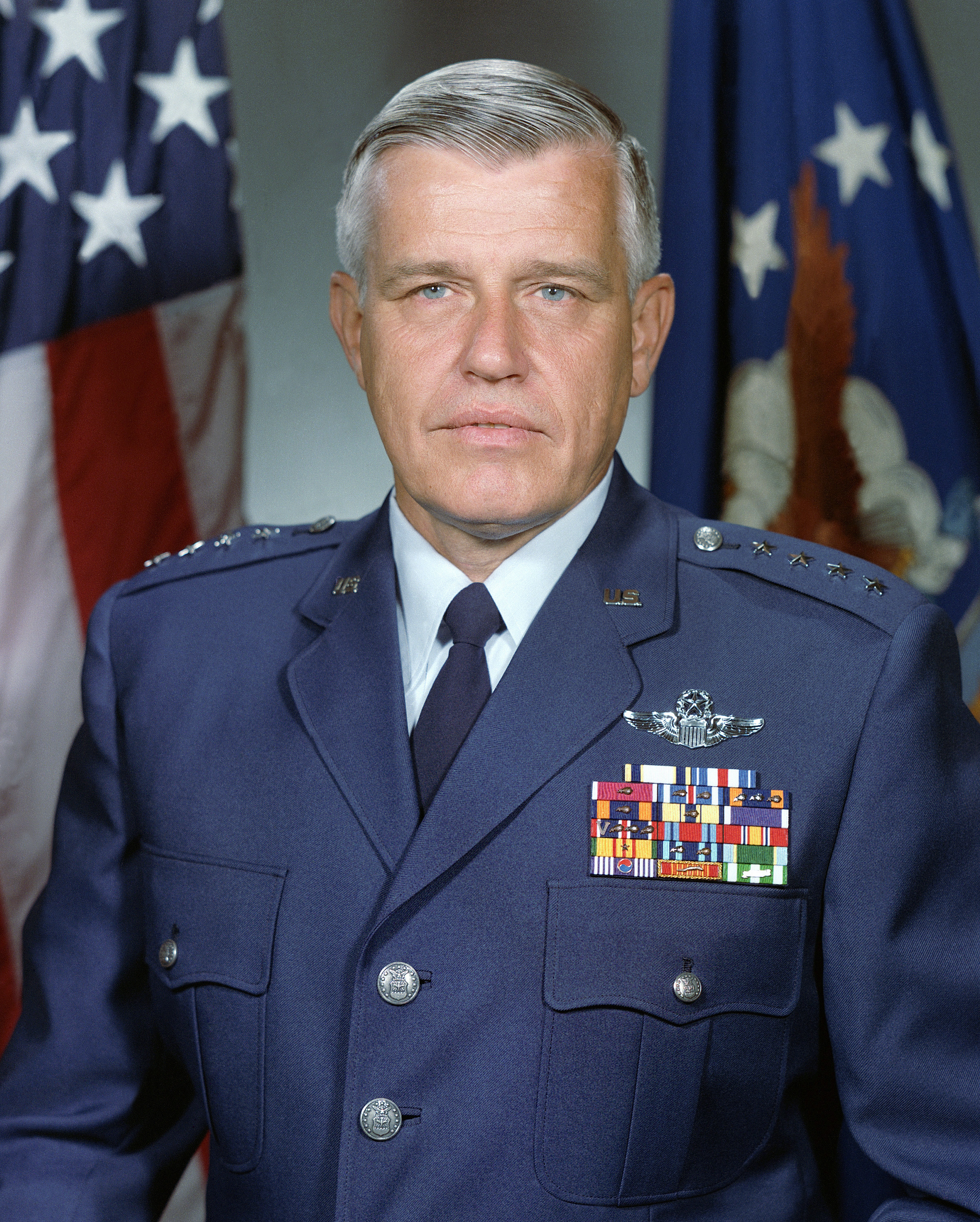
- General Robert D. Russ, 1985
- Born: March 7, 1933; Portland, Oregon, U.S.
- Died: May 22, 1997 (aged 64); Shalimar, Florida, U.S.
- Burial place: Arlington National Cemetery
- Military career
- Allegiance: United States
- Branch: United States Air Force
- Service years: 1955–1991
- Rank: General
- Commands: Vice Commander 68th Tactical Air Support Group; 4th Tactical Fighter Wing; Tactical Air Command
- Conflicts: Cold War; Vietnam War; Gulf War

Robert Dale Russ (March 7, 1933 – May 22, 1997) was a United States Air Force (USAF) general and commander of Tactical Air Command.

== Biography ==
=== Early life ===
Russ was born in 1933, in Portland, Oregon, and graduated from Wapato High School in Washington in 1951. He received a bachelor's degree in business administration from Washington State University in 1955.

He was commissioned as a second lieutenant through the Air Force Reserve Officer Training Corps program at Washington State University and entered active duty in September 1955 at Lackland Air Force Base, Texas. He completed pilot training at Webb Air Force Base, Texas, in October 1956 and subsequently attended F-84F Thunderjet gunnery school at Luke Air Force Base, Arizona, and F-100A Super Sabre gunnery school at Nellis Air Force Base, Nevada.

In May 1957, Russ was assigned to the 81st Tactical Fighter Wing at Royal Air Force Station Bentwaters, England, flying F-84F Thunderjets and, later, F-101A Voodoos. After completing this tour of duty in May 1960, he transferred to the 437th Fighter-Interceptor Squadron at Oxnard Air Force Base, California, where he flew F-101Bs. Moving to Hamilton Air Force Base, California, in May 1962, the general served as chief of the Fighter Section, Directorate of Tactical Evaluation, 28th Air Division, until August 1964.

After graduation from Air Command and Staff College in July 1965, he was assigned to Headquarters Air Defense Command, Colorado. That same year, he also received a master's degree in business administration from The George Washington University. While there he served as a fighter officer in the Directorate of Tactical Evaluation and later as aide to the commander, Air Defense Command. After attending F-4 Phantom replacement training at Davis-Monthan Air Force Base, Arizona, from July 1967 to January 1968, Russ was assigned to the 12th Tactical Fighter Wing at Cam Ranh Bay Air Base, Republic of Vietnam, where he flew 242 combat missions, of which 50 were over North Vietnam.

Upon returning to the United States in March 1969, he was a plans officer in the Fighter and Reconnaissance Branch of the Force Development Directorate, Office of the Deputy Chief of Staff, Plans and Operations, Headquarters United States Air Force, Washington D.C. He moved from the Air Staff to the Organization of the Joint Chiefs of Staff in December 1970 and served as plans officer for general purpose forces, J-5, Directorate of Plans, until July 1972. The general graduated from the National War College in June 1973 and was assigned to the 68th Tactical Air Support Group, Shaw Air Force Base, South Carolina, as vice commander. He held that position until becoming deputy commander for operations of Shaw's 363rd Tactical Reconnaissance Wing in January 1974.

=== Later career ===
Russ was vice commander of the 4th Tactical Fighter Wing at Seymour Johnson Air Force Base, North Carolina, from February 1974 until August 1975, when he became wing commander. In February 1977 he became assistant deputy chief of staff for plans at Tactical Air Command (TAC) headquarters, and in July 1977 was named the command's assistant deputy chief of staff, operations, for operations and training. He assumed duties as assistant deputy chief of staff, operations, for control and support in July 1978.

In November 1979 Russ moved to USAF headquarters and was appointed director of operational requirements, Office of the Deputy Chief of Staff, Research, Development and Acquisition. The general was named vice commander of TAC in October 1982 and in July 1983 became special assistant to the vice chief of staff, Washington, D.C. In October 1983 he became deputy chief of staff for research, development and acquisition at USAF headquarters. He assumed command of TAC in May 1985. He was promoted to general May 22, 1985, with same date of rank. He was buried at Arlington National Cemetery, in Arlington, Virginia.

== Awards ==
Awards earned during his career:

- Air Force Distinguished Service Medal
- Silver Star
- Legion of Merit with an oak leaf cluster
- Distinguished Flying Cross with two oak leaf clusters
- Purple Heart
- Air Medal with thirteen oak leaf clusters
- Air Force Commendation Medal with an oak leaf cluster
- Air Force Outstanding Unit Award with "V" device and five oak leaf clusters
- Air Force Organizational Excellence Award with two oak leaf clusters
- Combat Readiness Medal
- National Defense Service Medal
- Vietnam Service Medal with five service stars
- Air Force Overseas Ribbon-Short
- Air Force Overseas Ribbon-Long
- Air Force Longevity Service Award Ribbon with seven oak leaf clusters
- Small Arms Expert Marksmanship Ribbon
- Air Force Training Ribbon
- Order of National Security Merit
- Gugseon Medal (Republic of Korea)
- Republic of Vietnam Gallantry Cross with Palm
- Republic of Vietnam Campaign Medal
- Command pilot with more than 5,700 flying hours

== See also ==
- List of commanders of Tactical Air Command
