= Gabriel P. Disosway =

United States general

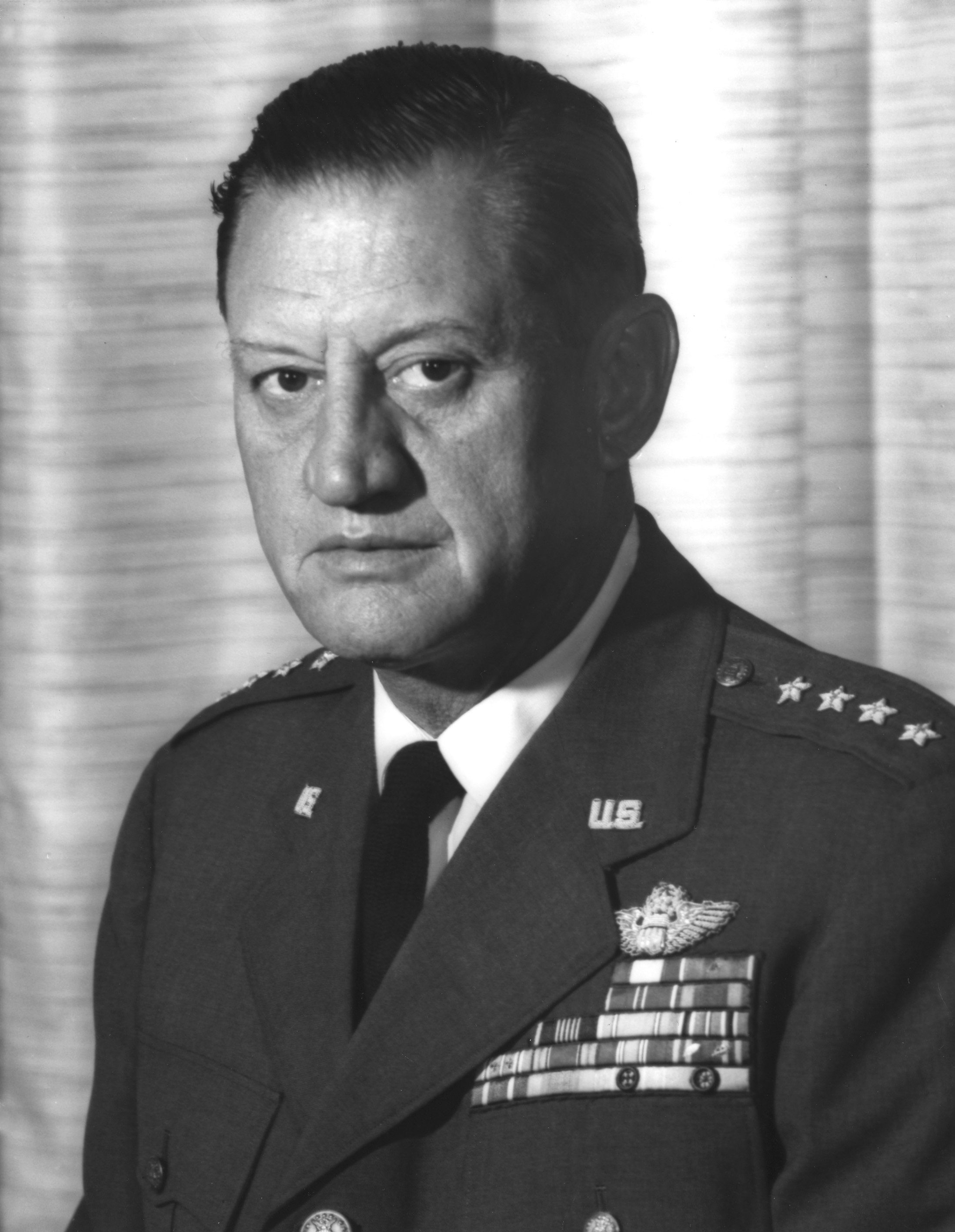
- General Gabriel P. Disosway
- Born: June 11, 1910; Pomona, California
- Died: February 23, 2001 (aged 90); Shreveport, Louisiana
- Burial place: Forest Park East Cemetery, Shreveport, Louisiana (formerly) Colorado Springs, El Paso County, Colorado (currently)
- Military career
- Allegiance: United States of America
- Branch: United States Air Force
- Service years: 1933–1968
- Rank: General
- Commands: Tactical Air Command; 17th Air Force; 12th Air Force
- Conflicts: World War II; Cold War
- Awards: Distinguished Service Medal; Legion of Merit (3); Bronze Star; Air Medal

General Gabriel Poillon Disosway (DIS-os-way; June 11, 1910 – February 23, 2001) was a noted four-star general in the United States Air Force (USAF) and served as commander of Tactical Air Command.

== Background ==
A native of Pomona, California, Disosway was born on June 11, 1910, to Wilbur Fotheringham Disosway and Elizabeth Forrest. Disosway is the namesake of his great-grandfather Gabriel Poillon Disosway (1798–1868) of Staten Island, New York, one of the founders of Randolph Macon College and one of the earliest leaders on Staten Island of the newly forming Methodist Church. Disosway is of Huguenot ancestry. Disosway graduated from Wichita Falls High School in Wichita Falls, Texas, in 1927 and then attended the University of Oklahoma. In July 1929, he entered the United States Military Academy and graduated class of 1933, where was commissioned a second lieutenant of Field Artillery in the United States Army. He entered Primary Flying School at Randolph Field, Texas, and upon completion of the course, transferred to the Advanced Flying School at Kelly Field, Texas, from which he graduated in October 1934. He transferred from the Field Artillery to the United States Army Air Corps in January 1935.

== Military career ==
Disosway's first assignments were with the 71st Service and 55th Pursuit Squadrons at Barksdale Field, Louisiana. He was transferred to Randolph Field as a primary flying instructor in March 1938 and remained there until January 1942, serving as an instructor and flight and stage commander. While with the 71st Service squadron Disosway coached the 71st baseball team which included Shoeless Joe Jackson who played under an assumed name and commented in a later interview that he played for different teams around the south.

He then went to Lake Charles Field, Louisiana, as director of flying, and in June 1942, returned to Randolph as director of training. He was appointed commander of Bryan Army Air Base, Texas, in January 1943.

In April 1943, General Disosway went to Albrook Field, Panama Canal Zone as commander of the 37th Fighter Group. He later served as air inspector and deputy commander of the XXVI Fighter Command in Panama and trained the First Brazilian Fighter Group which went to Italy. In September 1944 he was assigned as commander of Ephrata Army Air Base, Washington.

In January 1945, General Disosway was transferred to China as operations officer of the 312th Fighter Wing. He assumed command of the 311th Fighter Group in May 1945, and in July of the same year took command of the 312th Fighter Wing. In August he was named United States Army Air Forces liaison officer with the III Amphibious Corps of the United States Marine Corps in Tianjin, China.

General Disosway returned to the United States in April 1946, to become assistant commander of Barksdale Field. He entered the Air War College at Maxwell Field, Alabama in 1947. Upon graduation, he was appointed chief of the Training Division in the Directorate of Training and Requirements at Headquarters USAF, Washington, D.C.

portrait of Disosway as commander of the Air Training Command's Flying Training Air Forrce in the early 1950s

In February 1951, he became director of training in the Office of the Deputy Chief of Staff for Personnel, at Headquarters USAF. He next was named commander of Air Training Command's Flying Training Air Force in September 1952, with headquarters at Waco AFB, Texas. After nearly five years in this position, he assumed command of the 12th Air Force, with headquarters at Ramstein Air Base, West Germany.

In January 1958, he became deputy commander, United States Air Forces in Europe (USAFE), Advanced Operations Unit at Ramstein, becoming commander of the 17th Air Force, also at Ramstein, in November 1959.

Returning to the United States during June 1960, General Disosway was assigned duty as senior USAF member, Military Studies and Liaison Division, Weapons Systems Evaluation Group, Office of the Secretary of Defense (Research and Engineering). In mid-1961 he was promoted to lieutenant general and assigned as vice commander, Tactical Air Command. General Disosway became deputy chief of staff, operations, Headquarters USAF, in November 1962. This position was redesignated as deputy chief of staff, programs and requirements in February 1963.

In August 1963, he assumed command of USAFE, Wiesbaden, West Germany. Returning to the United States in July 1965 he assumed command of the Tactical Air Command, Langley Air Force Base, Virginia. He retired from the USAF on August 1, 1968, and died on February 23, 2001.

== Awards and decorations ==
A command pilot, Disosway received numerous awards and decorations including the Air Force Distinguished Service Medal, Legion of Merit with two oak leaf clusters, Bronze Star, Air Medal, Chinese Order of the Cloud and Banner, Chinese Order of Yun Hui and Brazilian Southern Cross.

== See also ==
- List of commanders of Tactical Air Command
- List of commanders of USAFE
