= Frank F. Everest =

United States Air Force general (1904–1983)

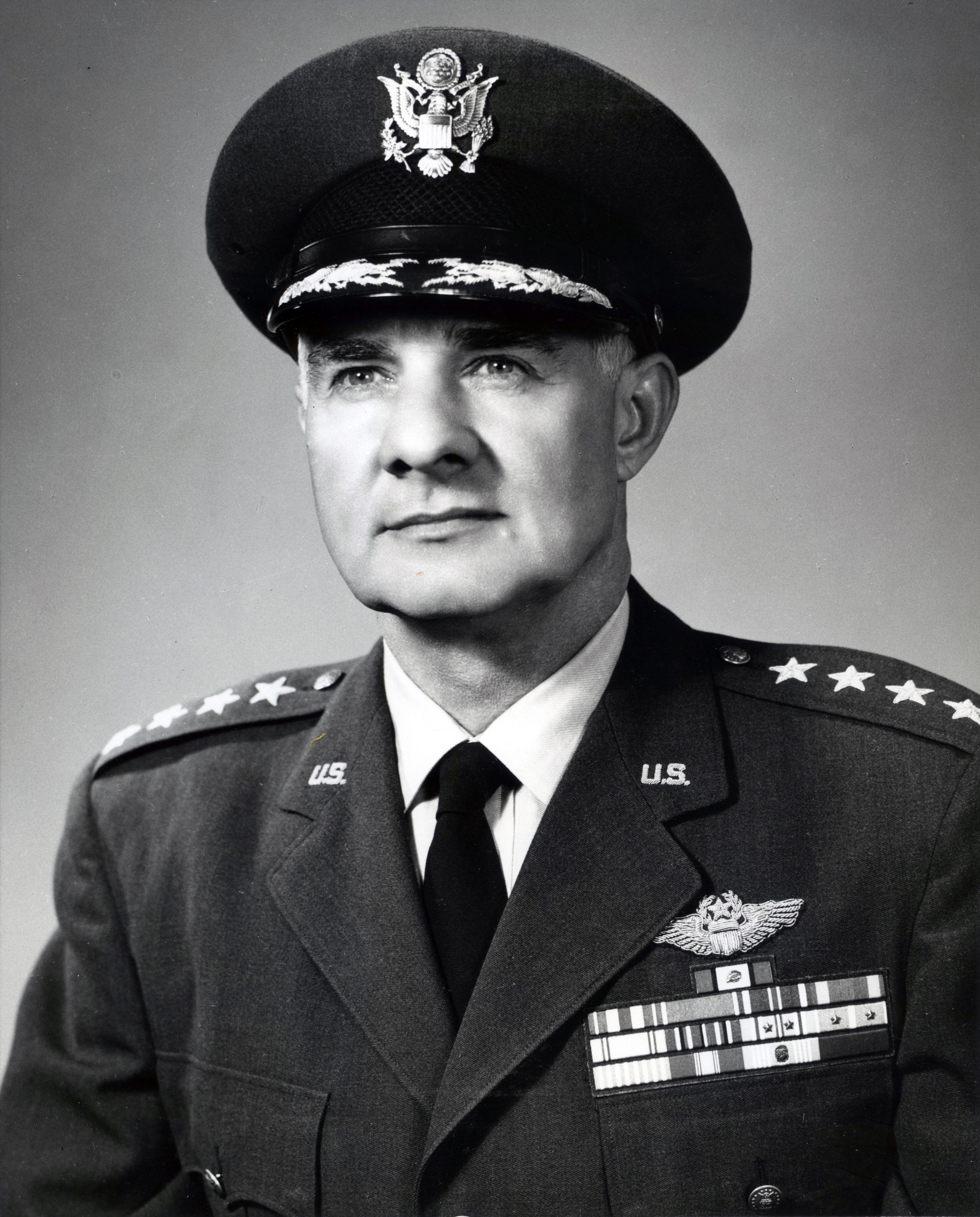
- General Frank F. Everest
- Born: November 13, 1904; Council Bluffs, Iowa, U.S.
- Died: October 10, 1983 (aged 78); Council Bluffs, Iowa, U.S.
- Military career
- Allegiance: United States of America
- Branch: United States Air Force
- Service years: 1928–1961
- Rank: General
- Commands: Tactical Air Command; U.S. Air Forces in Europe
- Conflicts: World War II; Korean War
- Awards: Silver Star; Legion of Merit; Distinguished Flying Cross; Air Medal

Frank Fort Everest (November 13, 1904 – October 10, 1983) was a four-star general in the United States Air Force (USAF). He commanded both United States Air Forces in Europe and Tactical Air Command.

== Biography ==
At West Point in 1928

He was born in Council Bluffs, Iowa, in 1904. He graduated from the United States Military Academy on June 9, 1928, and was commissioned a second lieutenant of Field Artillery.

Entering Primary Flying School at Brooks Field, Texas, Lieutenant Everest graduated from Advanced Flying School at Kelly Field, Texas, in September 1929, with initial assignment to the 8th Attack Squadron at Fort Crockett, Texas. After completing the armament course at the Air Technical School at Chanute Field, Illinois, in March 1933, he held several assignments at Maxwell Field, Alabama. Everest was promoted to first lieutenant in 1934, and to captain a year later. Captain Everest graduated from the Air Corps Tactical School at Maxwell in June 1937.

He then served in Hawaii at Wheeler Field with the 18th Pursuit Group, moving to Lowry Field, Colorado, in September 1939 as an instructor in the Air Corps Technical School. Everest was promoted to major in January 1941. The following August Major Everest was assigned to Headquarters, United States Army Air Forces (USAAF), for duty in the Plans and Training Division. He became a lieutenant colonel in January 1942 and in March joined the Operations and Planning Division of the War Department General Staff. He also became a colonel in March.

In August 1942 Colonel Everest was assigned to Headquarters, United States Army Air Forces in the South Pacific Area, where he served successively as liaison officer to the commander, aircraft, South Pacific; commanding officer of the 11th Heavy Bomb Group at New Hebrides Islands and Guadalcanal; and Army air officer on the staff of the commander of the South Pacific Theater. For combat action Everest earned a number of awards including the Silver Star for a key mission from Guadalcanal against the Japanese on February 13, 1943.

Colonel Everest was reassigned to USAAF Headquarters as Air Force director of the Joint War Plans Committee in the Office of the Assistant Chief of Air Staff for Plans in January 1944, and became a brigadier general in June. He joined the special organizational planning group at USAAF Headquarters in November 1945. Two months later he was designated Air Force member of the Joint Staff Planners of the Joint Chiefs of Staff, and in August 1946 he assumed additional duties as deputy assistant chief of air staff for plans at USAAF Headquarters.

Everest assumed command of the Yukon Sector, Alaskan Air Command, with headquarters at Ladd Field, Alaska, in January 1947 and remained there until June 1948, when he was named assistant deputy chief of staff for operations at United States Air Force (USAF) Headquarters in Washington. He became a major general in April 1948. In March 1950 he assumed the additional duty of senior USAF member on the Military Liaison Committee to the Atomic Energy Commission.

Everest became commanding general of the Fifth Air Force, Far East Air Forces, during the Korean War in May 1951. Through his efforts, the Fifth Air Force was able to attain, and maintain, air superiority over the enemy.

Everest became a lieutenant general in December 1951. In mid-1952 he was appointed deputy commander of Tactical Air Command (TAC) at Langley Air Force Base, Virginia. He was named director of the Joint Staff in the Office of the Joint Chiefs of Staff, Washington, in April 1953. One year later he was designated deputy chief of staff for operations at USAF Headquarters, a post he held until July 1, 1957, when he was appointed commander-in-chief of United States Air Forces in Europe and promoted to a full general.

Returning to the United States on August 1, 1959, General Everest was assigned duty as commander of TAC at Langley AFB. He retired from the United States Air Force on September 30, 1961.

Everest was awarded the Air Force Distinguished Service Medal with oak leaf cluster, the Silver Star, the Legion of Merit, the Distinguished Flying Cross, the Air Medal, Honorary Companion of the Military Division of the Most Honourable Order of the Bath, Republic of Korea's Taeguk Order of Military Merit, World War II Victory Medal.

He died on October 10, 1983.

General Everest was not related to General Frank Kendall Everest Jr.

== Effective dates of promotion ==
Insignia	Rank	Date
	General	July 1, 1957
	Lieutenant general	December 20, 1951
	Major general	April 9, 1948
	Brigadier general	June 5, 1944
	Colonel	March 1, 1942
	Lieutenant colonel	February 1, 1942
	Major	January 31, 1941
	Captain	March 11, 1935
	First lieutenant	March 1, 1934
	Second lieutenant	June 9, 1928

== See also ==
- List of commanders of Tactical Air Command
- List of commanders of USAFE
