= Robert J. Dixon =

United States Air Force general

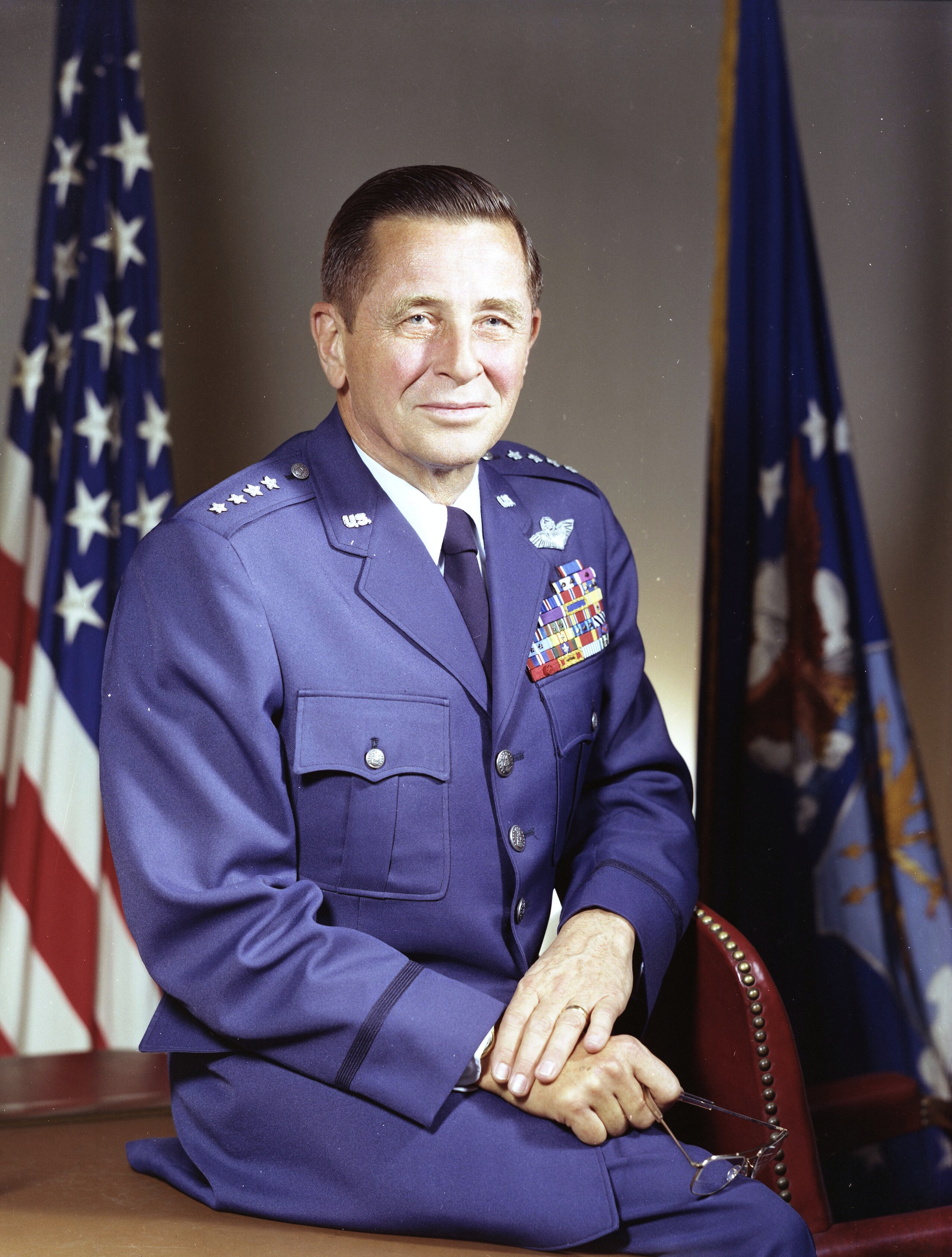
- General Robert J. Dixon
- Born: April 9, 1920; New York City, New York
- Died: March 21, 2003 (aged 82); Fair Oaks Ranch, Texas
- Military career
- Allegiance: United States of America
- Branch: Royal Canadian Air Force; United States Army; United States Air Force
- Service years: 1941–1943 (RCAF); 1943–1947 (USA); 1947–1978 (USAF)
- Rank: General
- Commands: Tactical Air Command
- Conflicts: World War II; Korea War; Vietnam War
- Awards: Distinguished Service Cross; Legion of Merit (2); Distinguished Flying Cross; Bronze Star; Air Medal (12); Purple Heart; Distinguished Flying Cross (United Kingdom)

General Robert James Dixon (April 9, 1920 – March 21, 2003) was a four-star general and Command Pilot in the United States Air Force (USAF) who served as Commander, Tactical Air Command (COMTAC) from 1973 to 1978. He also served simultaneously as commander in chief of U.S. Air Forces for both the U.S. Atlantic Command and U.S. Readiness Command.

== Biography ==
Dixon was born in New York City in 1920. He graduated from Dartmouth College in June 1941 with a Bachelor of Arts degree in literature. In 1941 he entered pilot training in the Royal Canadian Air Force (RCAF) and in November 1942 was commissioned a pilot officer (second lieutenant equivalent) in the RCAF. He then graduated with an additional navigator rating from the RCAF Astro Navigation School. After completing Supermarine Spitfire training at RAF Dyce, Scotland, he was assigned to the 541 Squadron Royal Air Force, a photo reconnaissance squadron at RAF Benson, England.

== World War II ==
In September 1943 during World War II, Dixon was transferred from the RCAF to the United States Army, where he served in the U.S. Army Air Forces and assigned to the 7th Photographic Group, Eighth Air Force, European Theater of Operations. In 1944 Dixon assumed command of the 14th Photographic Reconnaissance Squadron, 7th Photographic Group, which had Mark XI Spitfires, P-38 Lightnings and P-51 Mustangs.

He flew missions in four different aircraft for a total of 235 combat flying hours in 65 missions. He was shot down by enemy anti-aircraft fire while doing reconnaissance of the oil refinery at Merseburg, Germany in 1944. He was captured and remained a prisoner of war until liberated by U.S. forces in May 1945.

== Korea ==
After hospitalization, Dixon served at Will Rogers Field, Oklahoma City, Oklahoma, and Rapid City Army Air Field, South Dakota. He was an instructor at the West Point Preparatory School in 1947 and then was assigned as group and wing personnel officer for the 82d Fighter Wing, Grenier Field, New Hampshire.

From November 1948 to 1953, Dixon served in the Directorate of Personnel at Headquarters, Strategic Air Command. He next served 11 months in South Korea during the Korean War with the 4th Fighter-Interceptor Wing as wing inspector and then as commander of the 335th Fighter-Interceptor Squadron. He completed 28 combat missions before the Korean armistice.

Dixon returned to the United States in 1954. He was assigned to Headquarters USAF and subsequently served as assistant to the deputy chief of staff, plans and operations, for National Security Council affairs. In this capacity he was Air Force action officer with the Joint Chiefs of Staff, the U.S. Department of State and the National Security Council.

He graduated from the Air War College in 1959 and was assigned to Supreme Headquarters Allied Powers Europe (SHAPE), Paris, France, as staff missile planner. Reassigned to the Pentagon in 1962, he served as assistant deputy director for war plans and later as assistant for joint and National Security Council matters, deputy chief of staff, plans and operations. In this latter capacity, Dixon was the Air Force planner for Joint Chiefs of Staff matters.

In September 1965 Dixon was assigned to the 45th Air Division, Strategic Air Command, at Loring Air Force Base, Maine, as an air division commander responsible for B-52/KC-135 wings at Loring AFB, Dow AFB, Ernest Harmon AFB and Goose Air Base. From July 1967 until July 1969, he was assigned as assistant deputy chief of staff, personnel for military personnel, and Commander, Air Force Military Personnel Center, Randolph Air Force Base, Texas. While in this assignment, he received the 1969 Eugene M. Zuckert Management Award.

== Vietnam ==
In July 1969, during the Vietnam War, Dixon was transferred to the Republic of Vietnam as Vice Commander, Seventh Air Force. He flew 36 combat missions during this tour in Southeast Asia. On August 1, 1970, he was promoted to lieutenant general and assumed the duties of deputy chief of staff, personnel, Headquarters USAF. He served in that position until October 1, 1973, at which time he was promoted to general and assumed command of Tactical Air Command (TAC).

During his tenure as COMTAC, General Robert Dixon revamped the way TAC personnel trained. It was under his command that the Red Flag training exercises were started at Nellis Air Force Base, Nevada in order to more realistically simulate the expected combat environment and to reduce the high casualty rate experienced during the early phases of offensive operations in the Vietnam War. Another driver was the lessons learned during the 1973 Yom Kippur War, where the use of Soviet-supplied integrated air defense systems by the Egyptians and the Syrians had severely restricted the capability of the Israeli Air Force (IAF) to support the ground forces. Dixon developed a close friendship with the commander of the IAF, Major General Benny Peled that facilitated the prompt supply of U.S. replacement systems to Israel and also of Israeli-captured Soviet equipment to the U.S. Dixon also decentralized aircraft maintenance in order to improve aircraft availability and combat sortie rates.

== Post-military ==
Dixon retired from the military on May 1, 1978, and died on March 21, 2003.

== Awards and decorations ==
General Dixon was a Command Pilot with more than 6,000 flying hours. His military decorations and awards include the Distinguished Service Cross, Distinguished Service Medal with two oak leaf clusters, Legion of Merit with oak leaf cluster, Distinguished Flying Cross, Bronze Star, Air Medal with 11 oak leaf clusters, Purple Heart, British Distinguished Flying Cross and French Croix d'Officier de la Légion d'honneur. 1977 he get the Collier Trophy.

- Distinguished Service Cross
- Air Force Distinguished Service Medal with two oak leaf clusters
- Legion of Merit with oak leaf cluster
- Distinguished Flying Cross
- Bronze Star
- Purple Heart
- Air Medal with 11 oak leaf clusters
- British Distinguished Flying Cross
- Legion of Honor

== See also ==
- List of commanders of Tactical Air Command
