= Somerville (surname) =

Somerville is a Scottish surname of Norman origin.

== Derivation ==
Also for years the origin of the name was quoted from the book of surnames of Scotland, a copy did exist in the library of the University of Abertay in Dundee, stating the name originating from Caen or possibly from the commune of Sémerville (Semervilla 1209), near Évreux, that is 141 miles from Caen. However, there are other possibilities, first of all a disappeared place name of Cotentin Sumelleville (Summerleevilla ab. 1210) closer to Caen. Other hypothesis like Sommervieu (Bessin, Summerveium 1146 ; Sommerveu 1291), 18,5 miles from Caen, were proposed.

== History ==
In 1066 the Lord of Somerville, Sir Gaultier / Walter de Somerville joined William the conqueror on his invasion of England, for his support Sir Gaultier de Somerville was given land in the North of England. By the twelfth century, the Somervilles were granted land and title of lord in Scotland and were at one time among the noble families of Scotland. Alternatively, Somerville can also be a Scottish clan surname.

The Irish House of Somerville began when William Somerville came to Ireland in 1690. William was an Episcopalian minister forced to flee from his manse when it was attacked by Covenanters. William brought his sons William and Thomas with him to Ireland. While the younger William returned to Scotland, his brother Thomas stayed in Ireland. Thomas would be educated at Trinity College in Dublin eventually earning a BA in 1711. He entered the church of his father and was ordained a minister at Cloyne Cathedral in 1715. It was in 1732 that Thomas was made the rector of Myross and Castlehaven. It was his son Thomas who by becoming a very successful merchant with Newfoundland and the West Indies was able to build up the Irish house of Somerville to the ranks of landed gentry a class out of which the Somerville clan had dropped for five generations.

== People ==
The following people have the surname Somerville (or the variant Somervile):

- Amanda Somerville (b. 1979), American pop, metal singer
- Annis Somerville, New Zealand judge
- Alexander Somerville (1811–1885), Scottish journalist and soldier
- Alexander Neil Somerville, Scottish minister and evangelist
- Annesley Somerville (1858–1942), British politician
- Bonnie Somerville (b. 1974), American actress
- Boyle Somerville (1863–1936), brother of Edith, sailor, antiquarian, anthropologist, killed by the IRA
- Carla Somerville (b. 1973), Canadian field hockey player
- Daniel Somerville (1879–1938), British politician
- Dave Somerville (1933–2015), Canadian singer
- Ed Somerville (1853–1877), American baseball player
- Edith Somerville (1858–1949), Irish novelist
- Geraldine Somerville (b. 1967), Irish-born British actress
- Greg Somerville, NZ rugby player
- James Somerville (Bruce County politician) (1826–1898), Scottish-Canadian businessperson, notary and Member of Parliament (Bruce West electoral district)
- James Somerville (Wentworth County, Ontario politician) (1834–1916), Canadian journalist, editor and Member of Parliament (Brant North, Wentworth North and Brant electoral districts)
- James Somerville (1882–1949), British admiral during World War II
- James Dugald Somerville, best known as J. D. Somerville, Scottish-Australian historian
- Jason Somerville, American professional poker player
- Jimmy Somerville (footballer), Scottish football player
- Jimmy Somerville (b. 1961), Scottish pop singer
- John Somerville (1939–1984), Australian rules footballer with Essendon (1960–1967)
- John Somerville, Scottish football player and manager
- Colonel John (J.A.C.) Somerville, brother of Edith, Commandant Royal Military School of Music 1920–1925
- Julia Somerville (b. 1947), ITN newsreader
- Lord Somerville, any of a family of Scottish peers
- Margaret Somerville (b. 1942), Canadian ethicist
- Mary Somerville (1780–1872), Scottish scientific writer, after whom Somerville College is named
- Ormond Somerville (1868–1928), justice of the Supreme Court of Alabama
- Peggy Somerville (1918–1975), British Impressionist painter
- Peter Somerville (b. 1968), Australian rules footballer
- Phyllis Somerville (1943–2020), American actress
- Rachel Somerville, American astrophysicist and astronomer
- Reginald Somerville 1867–1948, English composer and actor
- Richard Somerville (b. 1941), American climatologist
- Robert Somerville (b. 1940), American historian of Christianity
- Robert Brown Somerville (1812–1904), Scottish-born merchant and politician in Quebec
- Ross Somerville (1903–1991), Canadian golfer
- Shirley-Anne Somerville (b. 1974), Scottish politician
- Thomas David Somerville (b. 1915), former Bishop of the Diocese of New Westminster
- Wesley Somerville (c.1941–1975), Northern Irish loyalist paramilitary
- William Lyon Somerville (1886–1965), Canadian architect
- William Somervile (1675–1742), English poet (Somerville is alternate surname spelling)
- William Somerville (disambiguation), several people

== See also ==
- Somerville (disambiguation)
- Sommerville (disambiguation)
