= Somervell =

Somervell may refer to:

== People ==
- Alexander Somervell (1796-1854), Texan soldier who led the Somervell Expedition into Mexico
- Arthur Somervell (1863–1937), British composer
- Brehon B. Somervell (1892–1955), American general
- D. C. Somervell (1885–1965), British historian
- Donald Somervell, Baron Somervell of Harrow (1889–1960), British judge and Conservative politician
- Howard Somervell (1890–1975), British explorer
- James Somervell (1825-1924), British Conservative politician
- William Somervell (1860–1934), British Liberal politician

== Places ==
- Somervell County, Texas

== Other ==
- USAV General Brehon B. Somervell, a logistics support vessel in the United States Army

== See also ==
- Somerville (disambiguation)
- Summerville (disambiguation)
