= Somerfield (disambiguation) =

Somerfield was a UK supermarket chain.

Somerfield may also refer to:

- Somerfield, New Zealand, a suburb of Christchurch
- Alf Somerfield (1918–1985), English footballer
- Stafford Somerfield (1911–1995), British newspaper editor
- USS Somerfield (1861), a Union ship in the American Civil War
- Somerfield, Pennsylvania, a ghost town under the waters of Youghiogheny River Lake

== See also ==
- Summerfield (disambiguation)
