= Patrol torpedo boat PT-658 =

Torpedo boat of the United States Navy

Motor torpedo boat PT-658
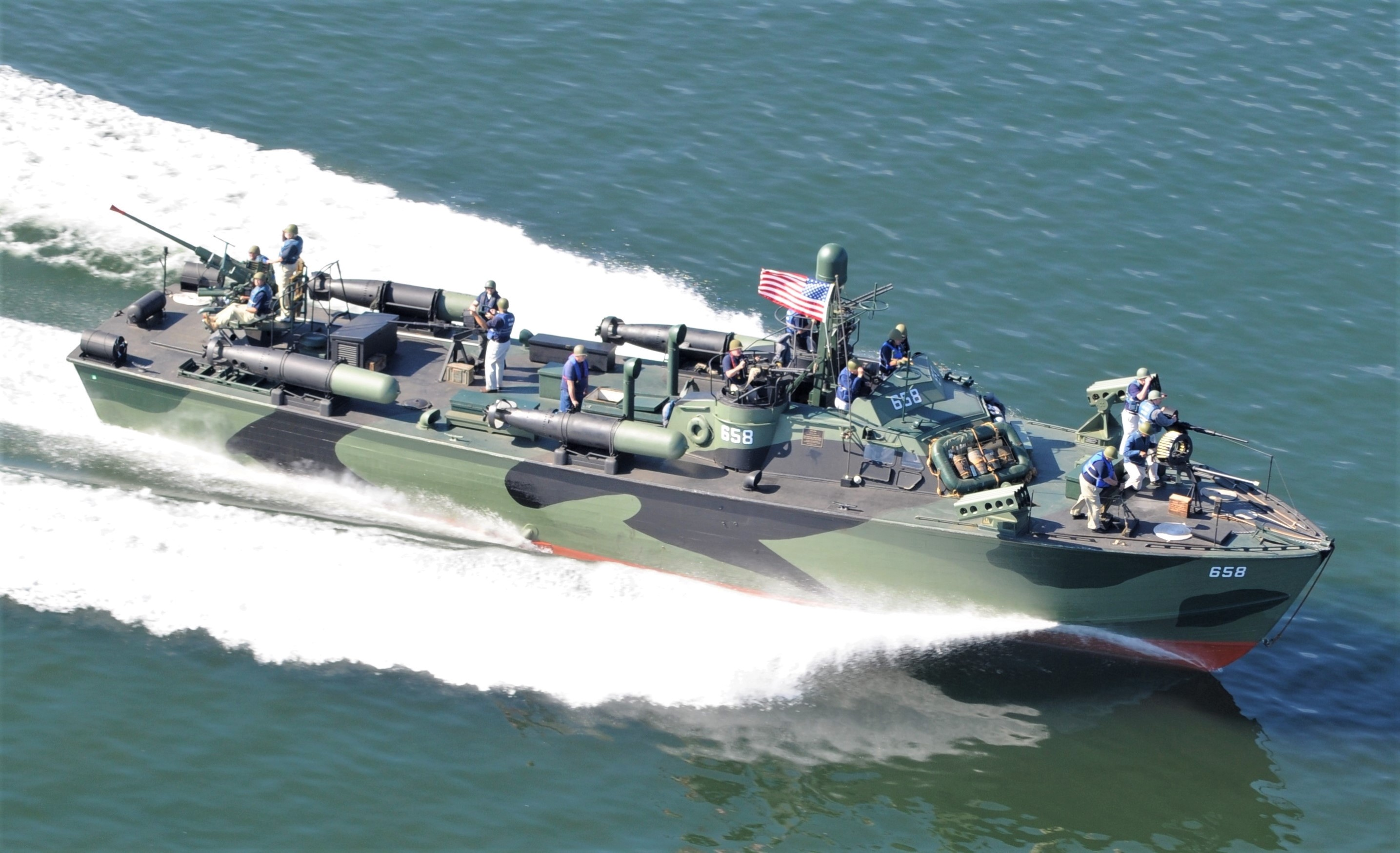
- PT-658 at 35 knots in October 2014

History

United States
- Builder: Higgins Industries, New Orleans
- Laid down: 24 February 1945
- Launched: 11 April 1945
- Completed: 30 July 1945
- Commissioned: 1945
- Decommissioned: 1958
- Reclassified: Small Boat, C105343, 27 August 1946; Floating Equipment, 3 December 1948; "RCT-13" 7 November 1949
- Identification: MMSI number: 367655060; Callsign: WDH8139
- Fate: Sold 30 June 1958; Museum ship from 1993

General characteristics
- Class & type: PT-625-class Higgins 78 ft (24 m) PT boat
- Displacement: 103,000 lb (47,000 kg)
- Length: 78 ft 6 in (23.93 m)
- Beam: 20 ft 1 in (6.12 m)
- Draft: 5 ft 3 in (1.60 m)
- Installed power: 3 × 1,850 shp (1,380 kW) Packard 5M-2500 V12 engines
- Propulsion: 3 shafts
- Speed: 41 knots (76 km/h; 47 mph)
- Range: 520 nmi (960 km; 600 mi) at 2,000 rpm
- Complement: 2 officers, 14 enlisted
- Sensors & processing systems: Raytheon SO/SO3 radar
- Electronic warfare & decoys: Farnsworth BN Interrogator Responsor and Hazeltine BK Transponder IFF
- Armament: 4 × 22.5 in (570 mm) Mark 13 torpedoes; 1 × Bofors 40 mm autocannon; 1 × 37 mm M4 cannon; 2 × Oerlikon 20 mm cannons; 2 × twin .50 cal. M2 Browning machine guns; 2 × Mk6 420 lbdepth charges; 2 × Mk50 Rocket Launchers (8 cell) firing 5 in (130 mm)Mk7 spin-stabilized rockets SSR; 1 × 60mm M2 Mortar for target illumination mounted on bow; 2 × .30 cal Browning Automatic Rifles BAR; 2 × Thompson submachine guns; 2 × M1 carbines; 1 × 35 gal Mk6 TiCl4 Smoke generator
- PT-658 (motor torpedo boat)
- U.S. National Register of Historic Places
- Location within Oregon
- Location: Vigor Industrial Shipyard, Pier 307 5555 N Basin Av., Portland, Oregon
- Coordinates: 45°34′13.4″N 122°43′13.6″W
- NRHP reference No.: 12000602
- Added to NRHP: 4 September 2012

Motor torpedo boat PT-658 is a PT-625-class Higgins 78-foot (24 m) PT boat, built for the United States Navy during World War II. PT-658 is a prime example of US Navy motor torpedo boat development during World War II. PT-658 was in the last group of four boats delivered from the 36-boat contract NObs-1680, October 1944 for PT-625 to PT-660. Delivered and accepted on 31 July 1945, she was fitted with all of the latest armaments and design modifications as a result of lessons learned from previous contracts and battlefield experience. In this way, PT-658 is a showcase of the final form that motor torpedo boats would take by the end of World War II. PT-658 was listed on the National Register of Historic Places on 4 September 2012. Of three PT boats listed on the National Register, she is one of 2 maintained in operating condition. (Note: PT-305, at The National WWII Museum in New Orleans, has been restored to operating condition as of March 2017, but it not (yet) listed in the National Register. PT-657 is operating in a non-historical configuration as the charter fishing boat Malahini out of San Diego.)

== Service history ==
PT-658 was one of a group of PT boats assigned to Motor Torpedo Boat Squadron 45 in April 1945, for transfer to the USSR under Lend-Lease. By the time she was completed on 30 July 1945, this transfer had been cancelled. PT-658 was transported to Bremerton, Washington on the deck of LST-375 from New Orleans along with PT-657, PT-659, and PT-660, arriving on 25 September 1945. PT-658 was then stationed at Port Hueneme, California, where on 27 August 1946, she was reclassified as a Small Boat, renumbered C105343, and served as a missile range patrol boat. On 3 December 1948, she was reclassified as Floating Equipment. PT-658 was then transferred to Naval Air Station Point Mugu, reclassified as RCT-13, and used to patrol the Point Mugu missile test range for watercraft straying into the missile landing area, and for towing targets. Also during this period, PT-658 served twice a week as a high speed transport, carrying men and supplies to the United States Air Force D.E.W. Radar Station on Santa Rosa Island, off the coast of Los Angeles in the Channel Island Group. PT-658's survival has been attributed to her completion late in the war, and that she was never sent overseas.

On 30 June 1958, PT-658 was sold to a private individual in the Oakland and Alameda, California area and renamed Porpoise. The private owner changed very little of her structure during the time he owned her. In 1993, she was donated by the late owner's estate to the veterans of Save the PT Boat, Inc. of Portland, Oregon. PT-658 was transported from Alameda to Portland in May 1994 by the 144th Transportation Unit of the Washington National Guard on the deck of the U.S. Army Logistics Support Vessel General Brehon B. Somervell (LSV-3).

== Restoration ==
A dedicated group of PT boat veterans formed the organization Save the PT Boat, Inc., a 501(c)(3) non-profit organization. The group restored PT-658 to her original 1945 configuration between 1995 and 2005. PT-658 is now fully functional and afloat, one of only two restored U.S. Navy PT boats that are operational today.

(The second, PT-305, was the beneficiary of some leftover parts collected by the PT-658 restoration team.)

PT-658's restoration includes (non-functional replicas of) a full armament of four Mark 13 torpedoes, two twin .50 caliber Browning M2 machine guns, a 40 mm Bofors cannon, two 20 mm Oerlikon cannon, two eight-cell Mark 50 Spin Stabilized 5-inch rocket launchers, two Mark 6 300 lb (140 kg) TNT depth charges, and a 60 m M2 mortar. She has three working 1,850 hp (1,380 kW) Packard 5M-2500 V12 gasoline engines.

PT-658 Heritage Museum is located in Portland, Oregon, at the Swan Island Industrial Park. She is moored to Pier 307 of Vigor Industrial Shipyard as of October 2013. Visitor access is provided via the marked Gate 18 at 5555 N. Lagoon Avenue. The PT-658 Heritage Museum is open to the public every Monday, Thursday and Saturday, 9am to 4pm for visitors. She has been moved into a new boathouse and the group continues to raise money for ongoing projects such as deck replacement, charthouse repair, and bottom replacement. Money is also being raised for final boathouse improvements and to build a PT-658 Heritage and Education Center. In May 2010, replacement of the deck was completed in time for various summer festivals and shows.

Funding raised for additional restoration work included a $14,000 grant from the Oregon Cultural Trust, awarded in July 2010.

When originally launched in 1945, PT-658 wore a camouflage paint scheme (specifically, Camouflage Measure 31, Design 20L), and this was restored in early 2011. In July 2011, two Mark 50 eight-cell rocket launcher mounts were added to the port and starboard bow. In May 2012, an original SOA radar mast (obtained on loan from PT Boats Inc. of Germantown, Tennessee) was installed along with an appropriately sized radar dome, signal generator and waveguide. Simultaneously, the 40mm Bofors cannon mount was improved with the addition of an ammunition clip holder/loader handrail to the rear of the mount, along with adjustable seats and authentic aerial spider type gunsights. Further equipment additions added by the crew in 2014 include authentic IFF dipole antennae on the chart house and radar mast, and a US M2 60mm mortar on the starboard side of the bow.

PT-658
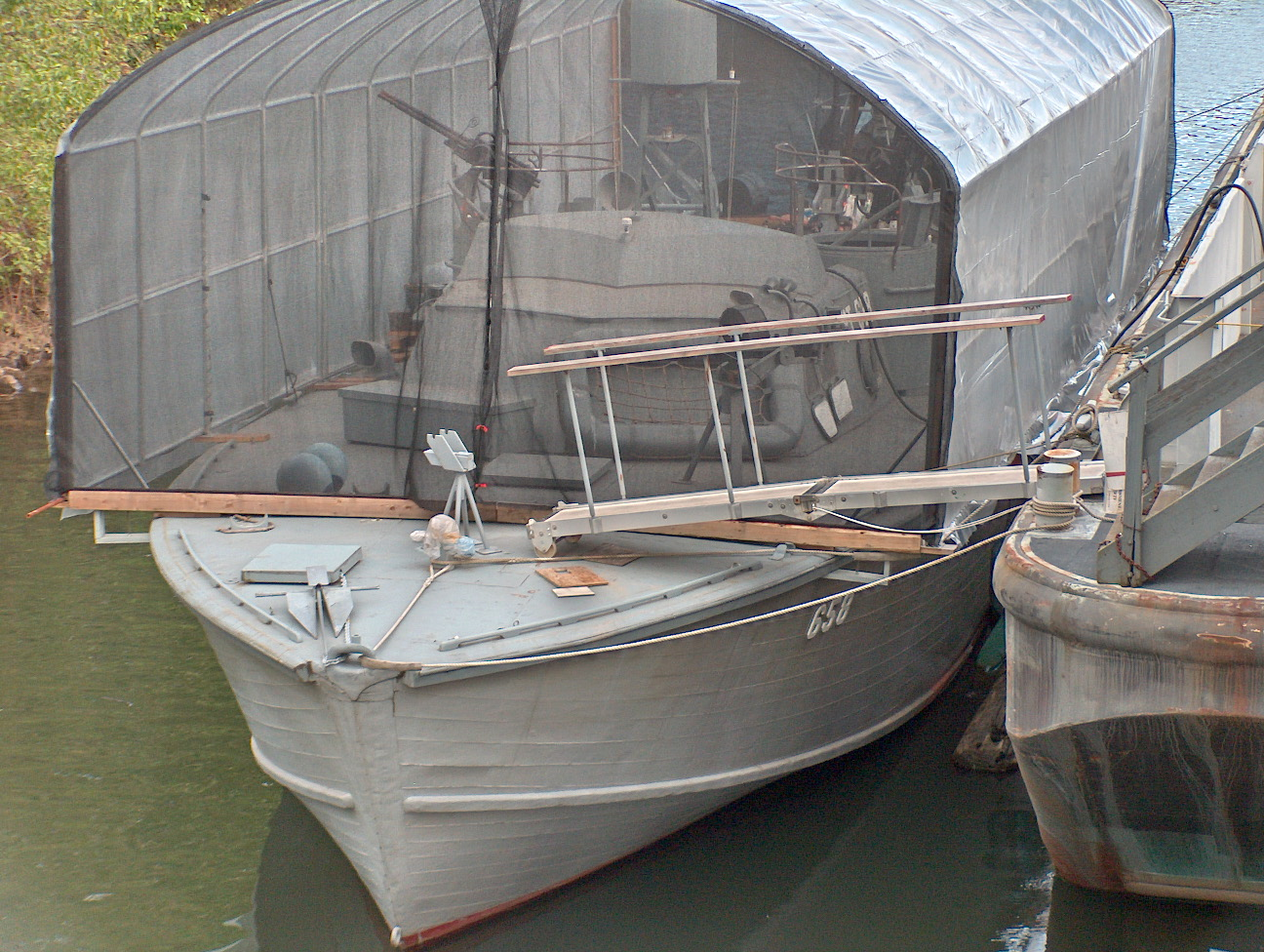
PT-658 in Portland, Oregon, in 2007

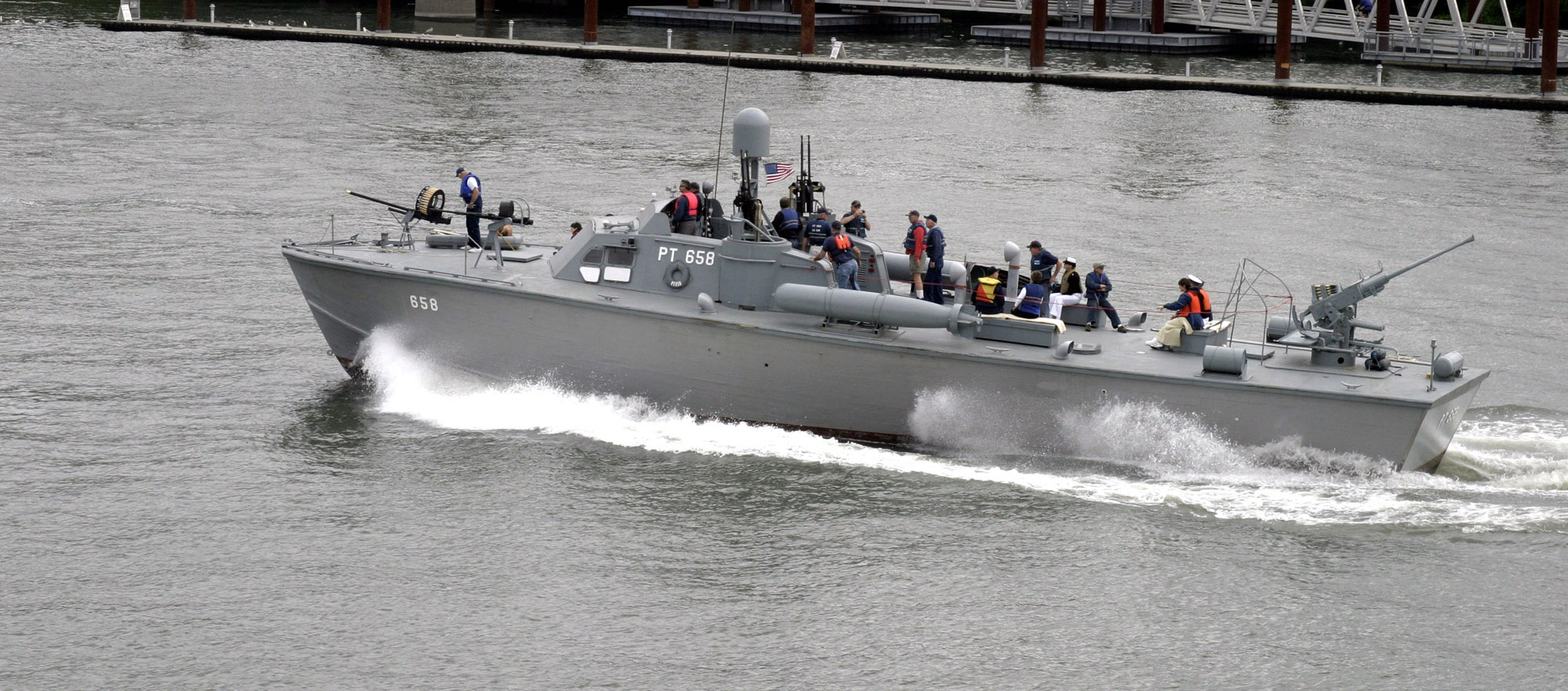
PT-658 in 2006, in the paint scheme she wore from the late 1940s through 2010

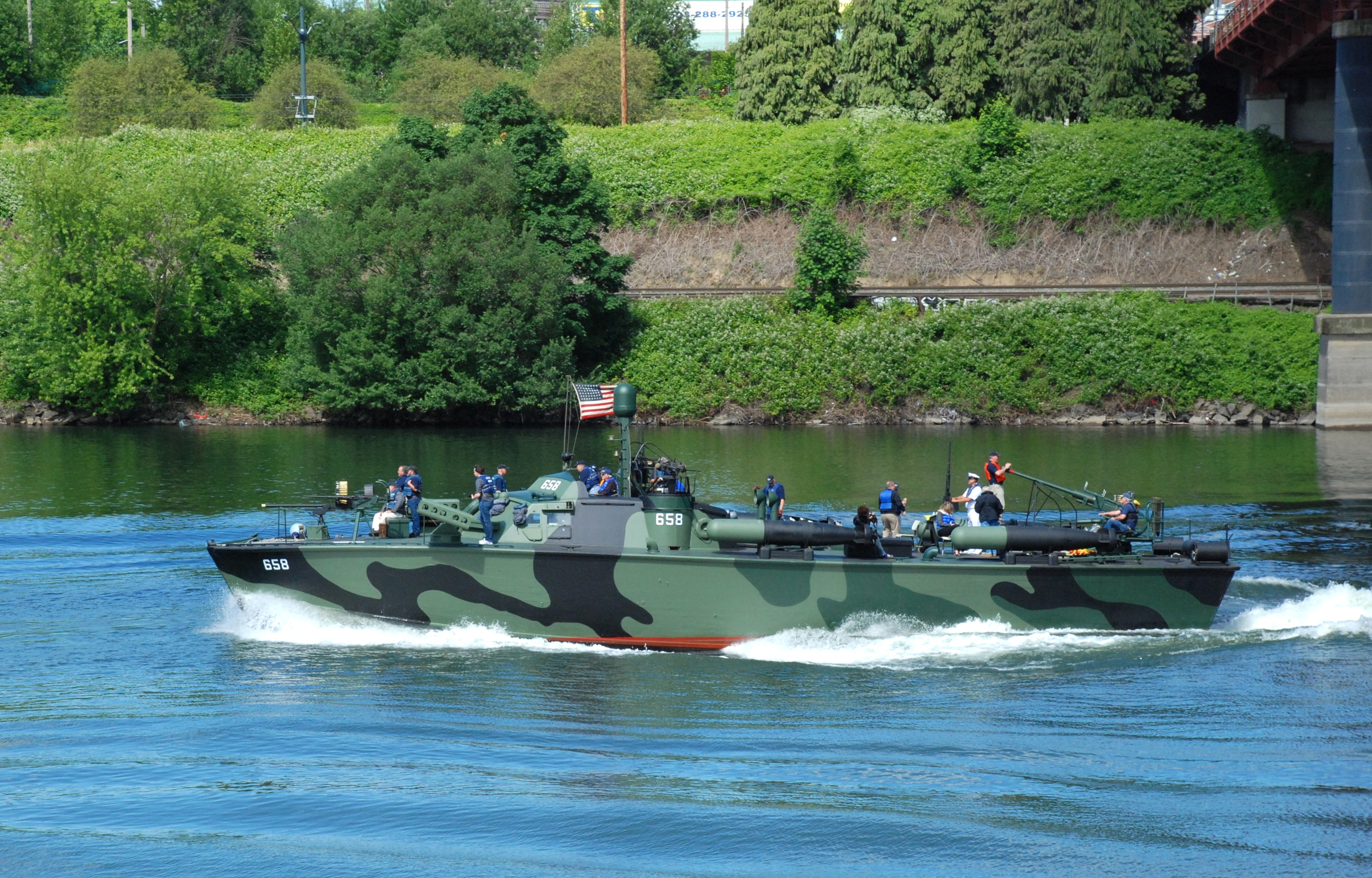
In 2011, PT-658 was restored to her original paint scheme, a camouflage pattern known as Measure 31-20L.

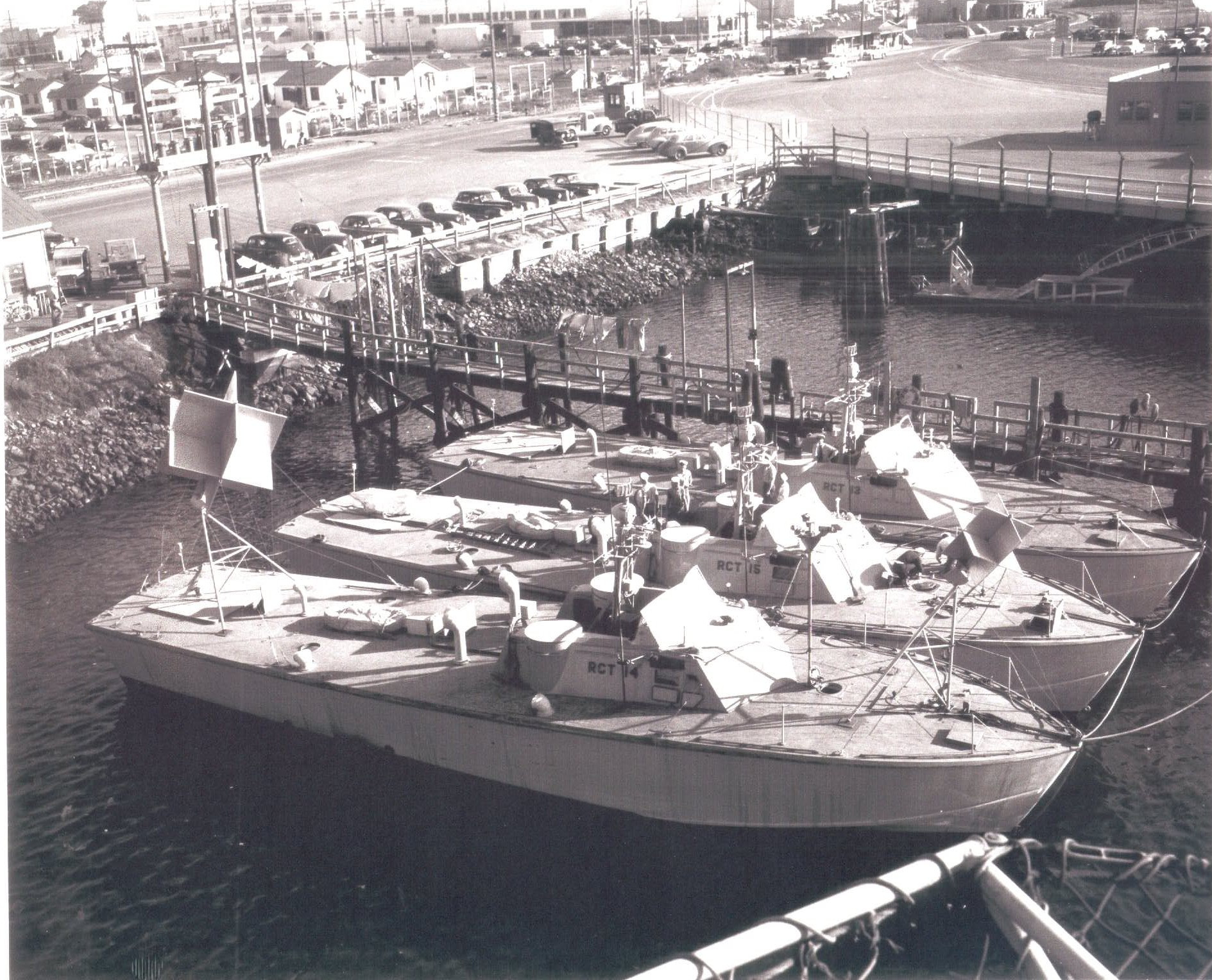
PT-658, PT-659 and PT-660 (RCT-13, RCT-14 and RCT-15), Point Mugu Boat Basin November 1949

PT veteran Dick Lowe in front of bunk

== See also ==
- List of museum ships
- Patrol torpedo boat PT-657
