= Somerville =

Somerville may refer to:

== Places ==
=== Australia ===
- Somerville, Victoria, a town
  - Somerville railway station
- Somerville, Western Australia, a suburb of Kalgoorlie

=== New Zealand ===
- Somerville, New Zealand, a suburb of Manukau City

=== United States ===
- Somerville, Alabama, a town
- Somerville (Kenton, Delaware), a historic house
- Somerville, Indiana, a town
- Somerville, Maine, a town
- Somerville, Massachusetts, a city
- Somerville, New Jersey, a borough
  - Somerville Circle, a traffic circle near Somerville, New Jersey
- Somerville, Ohio, a census-designated place
- Somerville, Queens, a neighborhood located in Arverne, Queens in New York City
- Somerville, Tennessee, a town
- Somerville, Texas, a city
  - Somerville Lake, a reservoir near Somerville, Texas
- Somerville, Virginia, an unincorporated hamlet in Fauquier County

== Other uses ==
- Somerville (surname)
- Somerville (crater), a crater in the eastern part of the Moon
- Somerville (video game), a 2022 game from Jumpship
- Somerville College, Oxford, a constituent college of the University of Oxford
- Somerville College Boat Club, the rowing club of Somerville College, Oxford
- Somerville Theatre, a movie theatre and concert venue in Massachusetts
- Somerville Auditorium, an outdoor cinema at the University of Western Australia
- Somerville Times, a newspaper published in Somerville, Massachusetts

== See also ==
- Somervell, a surname
- Somersville (disambiguation)
- Sommerville (disambiguation)
- Summerville (disambiguation)
