= Harris Dining Hall (Miami University) =

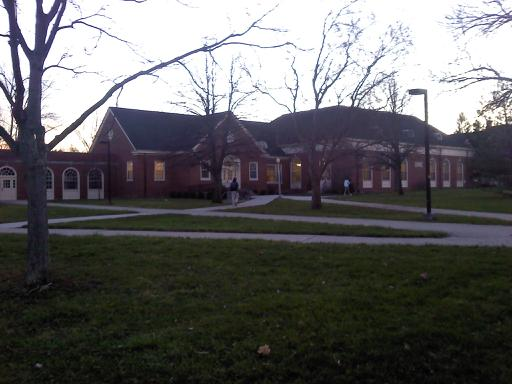
- A view of Harris Dining Hall

- Location within Ohio
- Alternative names: Harris Hall

General information
- Architectural style: Georgian Revival
- Location: Oxford, Ohio, United States
- Coordinates: 39°30′07″N 84°44′05″W
- Inaugurated: 16 September 1961
- Cost: $1,278,000.00
- Owner: Miami University

Dimensions
- Other dimensions: 50,035 GSF

Design and construction
- Architects: Cellarius & Hilmer
- Main contractor: Frank Messer & Sons

Harris Dining Hall – also known simply as Harris Hall- was named after Andrew Lintner Harris and was one of the many dining facilities located on the campus at Miami University in Oxford, Ohio. Since 1961, it was the main all-you-can-eat dining hall for undergraduate students who live on the southern side of the campus. The dining hall was closed after the spring semester of the 2016/2017 school year and it is unknown whether it will reopen. Harris was designed like most other buildings on campus in red brick and with a Georgian Revival architectural style.

== Location ==
Harris Dining Hall is located on the South Quadrangle of Miami University's campus. Adjacent to the main dining hall in the same building are two other dining areas, Panache, a restaurant in the west side of the building, and La Mia Cucina in the east dining room. La Mia Cucina, a restaurant which opened February 3, 2010, served many different Italian dishes for students. Each of these dining spaces accepted payment in the form of a meal plan or with cash or credit.

There are quite a few residence halls that border Harris Dining Hall and many of the students who live in these areas ate here because of its convenient location. Anderson Hall and Stanton Hall are located directly next to Harris Dining Hall. Dodds, MacCracken and Porter Hall are also situated in the same area on the South Quad. There are three other halls across the street, Morris, Emerson, and Tappan that form an area which is sometimes referred to as MET quad. They are also considered a part of South Quad.

== History ==
Before Harris Dining Hall was built, the area held a temporary dining spot called South Dining Hall. In 1946, this wooden structure was purchased as war surplus from the government and used for dining services. In 1961, Harris Hall was built and dedicated in a ceremony along with six other newly developed buildings. The dedication took place on the South Quadrangle of South Campus in a ceremony on September 16, 1961, at approximately 11am. President John Millett spoke at the dedication ceremony and the chairman at that time, Edward Nippert, presided over the event.

Each of these new residence and dining halls, MacCracken, Dodds, Stanton, Harris, Anderson, and Porter Hall, were dedicated to people who had relations to Miami University. Two halls, Anderson and Stanton Hall, were named after past presidents of Miami. Harris Dining Hall was named after Andrew Lintner Harris, a former governor of Ohio and Miami University student. Harris Dining Hall was built to be the central dining hall for South Campus.

== Andrew Lintner Harris ==
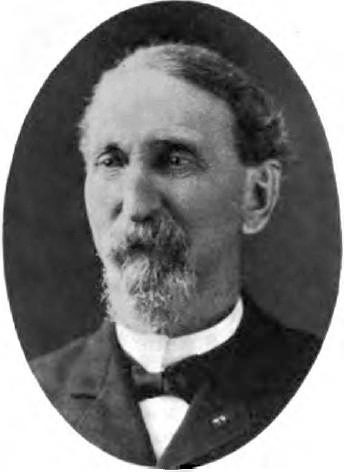
Andrew Lintner Harris

Andrew L. Harris (b. November 17, 1835º was the 44th governor of Ohio.
