= Ampherlaw House =

Coordinates: 55°44′10″N 3°36′27″W

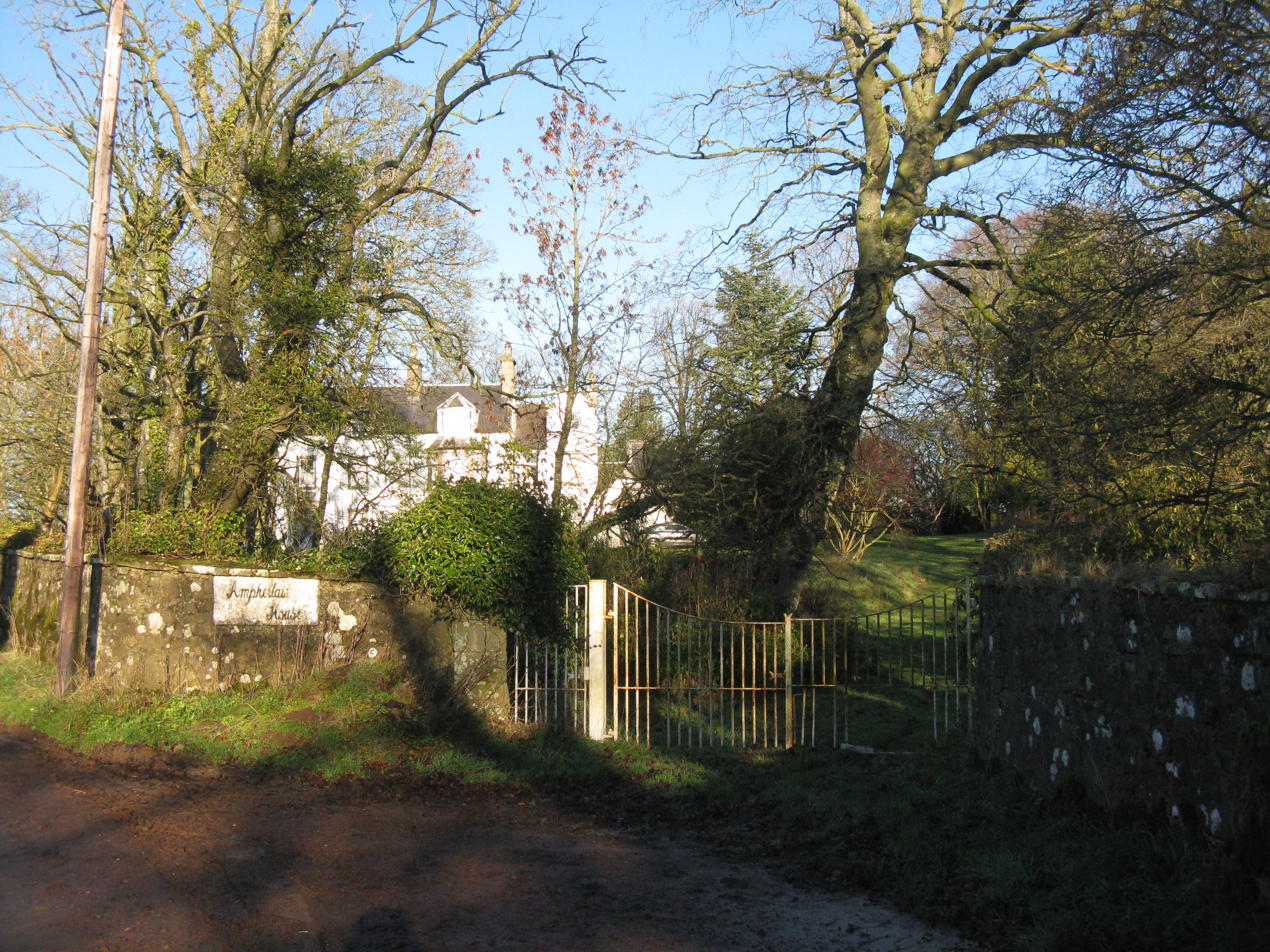
- Interactive map of the Ampherlaw House area

General information
- Status: Completed
- Type: Laird's house
- Architectural style: 18th century, with 19th and early-20th century additions
- Location: Carnwath, South Lanarkshire, Scotland
- Completed: early-20th century

Technical details
- Floor count: 2

Website
- https://portal.historicenvironment.scot/designation/LB706

Ampherlaw House is a manor house in Lanarkshire, Scotland, near the village of Carnwath and one of the former possessions of the Somerville family. It was built before the 18th century. The house is "B" listed by Historic Environment Scotland.

== History ==
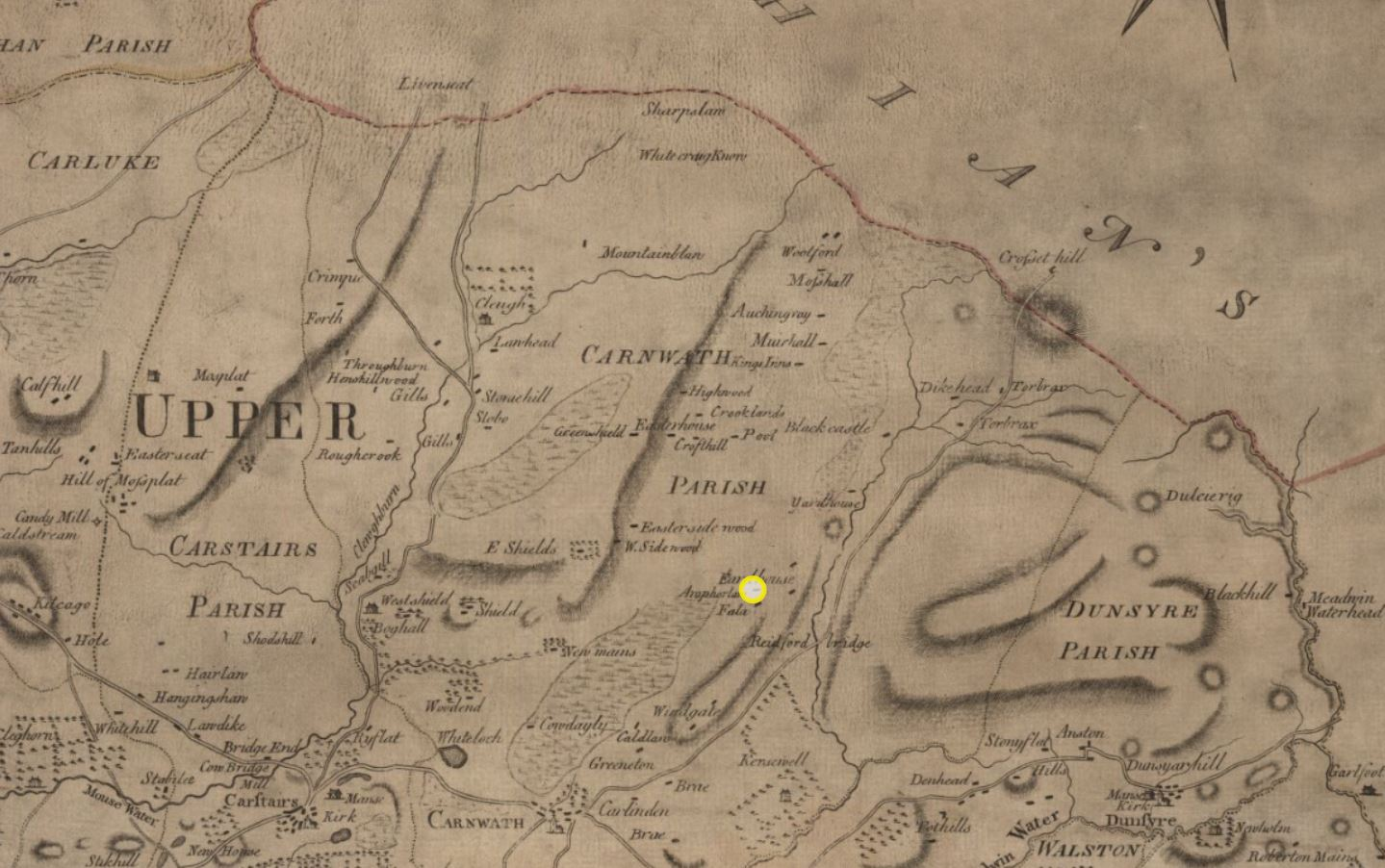
Location of Ampherlaw House on a map by Ross, C (1773) A Map of the shire of Lanark

The members of the Somerville family who held the Ampherlaw estate were cadets of the Lords Somerville of Carnwath and Linton. After the siege of Cowthally Castle in 1597, which later fell into ruins - three important stones were retained and erected at Ampherlaw. One is a marriage stone from 1569, another is of Dame Janet Maitland depicted as Charity and finally, there is a statue of Mary, Queen of Scots, playing the lute. This is especially suitable, as the Somerville family were supporters of the Marian cause and assisted in raising an army for her in 1568 at Hamilton.

William Somerville Esq. of Ampherlaw, although the eldest son and born at Ampherlaw, was passed over for his younger brother, in the Scottish manner of succession to land and titles, and chose to emigrate to Tasmania with his wife and several children. Their ship was the ill-fated Catherine Sharer, which blew up in June 1855 in the D'Entrecasteaux Channel at night on its approach to Hobart. The unhappy emigrants were clad only in their nightclothes, so urgent was their escape. The ship was smuggling gunpowder, which was believed to have been ignited by a disaffected sailor.

William Somerville and his family settled at Huntly Hill in Lilydale, where he was a successful farmer, J.P. and lay preacher of the Presbyterian Church.
