= William Somerville =

William Somerville may refer to:

- William Somervile (1675–1742), English poet, also written as William Somerville
- William Somerville (cricketer) (born 1984), New Zealand cricketer
- William Somerville (physician) (1771–1860), Scottish physician
- William E. Somerville (1869–1950), Scottish aircraft engineer
- William Lyon Somerville (1886–1965), Canadian architect
- William Lorne Northmore Somerville (1921–2009), Canadian lawyer
- William Somerville, 1st Baron Athlumney (1802–1873), Anglo-Irish politician
- William C. Somerville (1790–1826), American plantation owner, author, historian and diplomat
- William Somerville, 2nd Lord Somerville (died 1456), member of the Scottish Parliament
- William Somerville (priest), Archdeacon of Armagh
- Sir William Somerville (agriculturalist) (1860-1932), British agriculturalist
