= Summersville =

Summersville may refer to a place in the United States:

- Summersville, Kentucky
- Summersville, Missouri
- Summersville, West Virginia

== See also ==
- Somersville (disambiguation)
- Summerville (disambiguation)
