= Somersville =

Somersville may refer to:

- Somersville, California
- Somersville, Connecticut
- Somersville, Ohio
- Somersville Historic District, in Somers, Connecticut
- Somersville Towne Center, a regional shopping mall in Antioch, California

== See also ==
- Somerville (disambiguation)
- Summersville (disambiguation)
