= Patrol torpedo boat PT-657 =

Torpedo boat of the United States Navy

Coordinates: 32.723333°N 117.227667°W

Motor torpedo boat PT-657
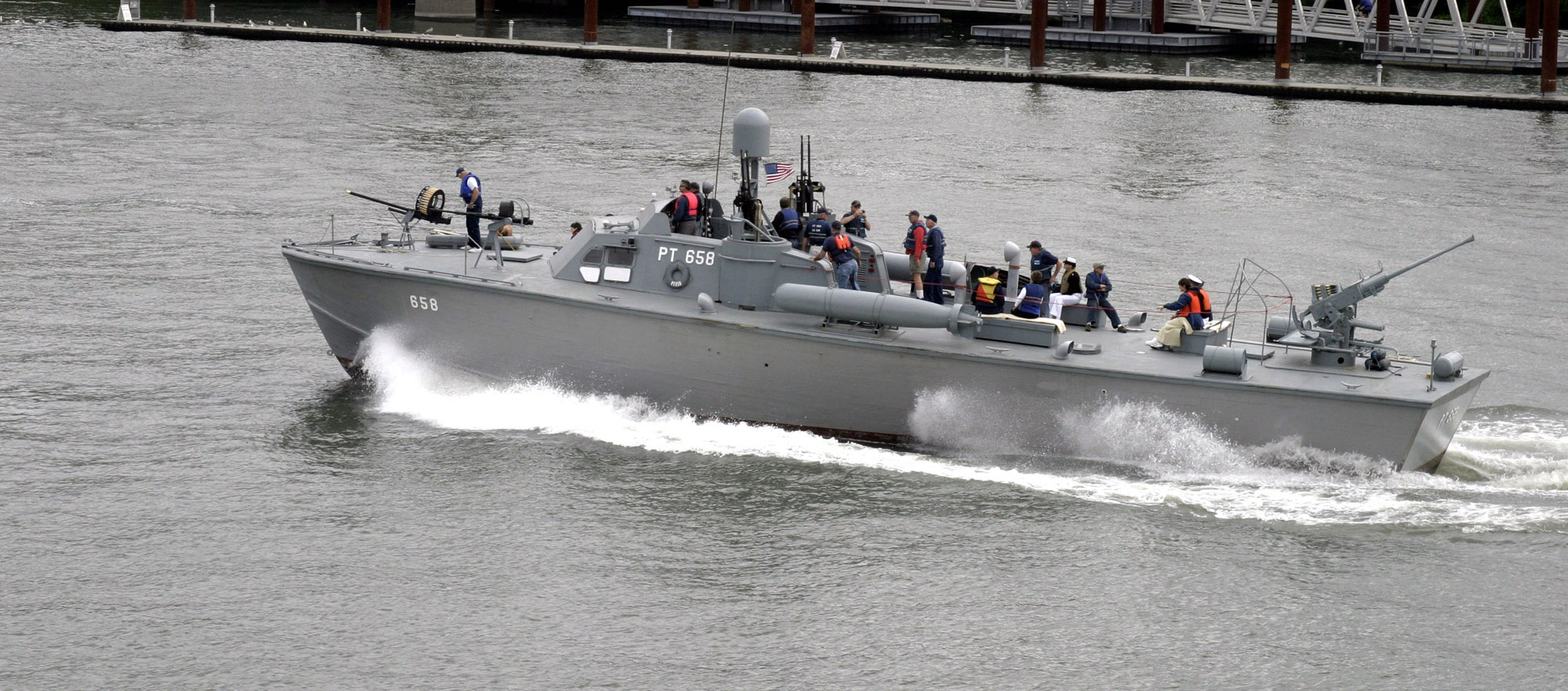
- PT-657 sister 78-foot Higgins PT Boat PT-658

History

United States
- Builder: Higgins Industries, New Orleans
- Laid down: 16 February 1945
- Launched: 2 April 1945
- Completed: 21 July 1945
- Commissioned: 1945
- Decommissioned: 28 November 1945
- Identification: Callsign: Nan - Queen - Item - William
- Fate: Sold; Charter fishing boat Owner William Wilkerson at H & M Landing, San Diego; Named Malihini.

General characteristics
- Class & type: PT-625-class Higgins 78 ft (24 m) PT boat
- Displacement: 103,000 lb (47,000 kg)
- Length: 78 ft 6 in (23.93 m)
- Beam: 20 ft 1 in (6.12 m)
- Draft: 5 ft 3 in (1.60 m)
- Installed power: 3 × 1,850 shp (1,380 kW) Packard 5M-2500 V12 engines
- Propulsion: 3 shafts
- Speed: 41 knots (76 km/h; 47 mph)
- Range: 520 nmi (960 km; 600 mi) at 2,000 rpm
- Complement: 2 officers, 14 enlisted
- Sensors & processing systems: Raytheon SO
- Electronic warfare & decoys: Farnsworth BN Interrogator Responsor and Hazeltine BK Transponder IFF
- Armament: 4 × 22.5 in (570 mm) Mark 13 torpedoes; 1 × Bofors 40 mm autocannon; 1 × 37 mm M4 cannon; 2 × Oerlikon 20 mm cannons; 2 × twin .50 cal. M2 Browning machine guns; 2 × Mk6 420 lbdepth charges; 2 × Mk50 Rocket Launchers (8 cell) firing 5 in (130 mm)Mk7 spin-stabilized rockets SSR; 1 × 60mm M2 Mortar for target illumination mounted on bow; 2 × .30 cal Browning Automatic Rifles BAR; 2 × Thompson submachine guns; 2 × M1 carbines; 1 × 35 gal Mk6 TiCl4 Smoke generator

Motor torpedo boat PT-657 is a PT-657-class Higgins 78-foot (24 m) PT boat, built for the United States Navy during World War II. PT-657 was built at Higgins Industries in New Orleans, Louisiana. PT-657 part of United States Navy order for boats: PT-625 to PT-660. PT-657 was laid down on 16 February 1945, launched on 2 April 1945 and completed on 21 July 1945. PT-657 was scheduled for transfer to the Soviet Union on the Lend-Lease act, but the war need before the transfer and the transfer was canceled. With the war ending on in September 1945 and no need for PT-boats, PT-657 was struck as a PT boat from the Navy Register on 28 November 1945. Later sold off as a charter fishing boat Malihini in San Diego, California.

== History ==
This group of PT boats was delivered to the US Navy 31 July 1945 and was to be part of PT Squadron (RON) 45. PT-657 on a LST ship going from New Orleans to Seattle when the war ended. The LST ship returned to New Orleans. ' On 14 November 1946 PT-657 was transferred to the War Shipping Administration 14 November 1946 to be sold as surplus. PT-625 was sold and converted to a charter fishing boat, in a non-historical configuration. She is now owned by William Wilkerson of San Diego, operating out of H & M Landing, San Diego, named Malihini. The word Malihini is a Hawaiian word meaning a foreigner, a stranger or newcomer to a place.

== Gallery ==
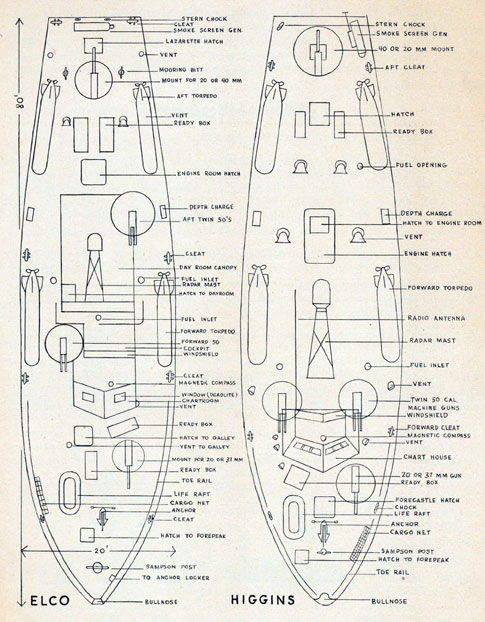
ELCO and Higgins PT boats, Know Your PT Boat US Navy July 1945

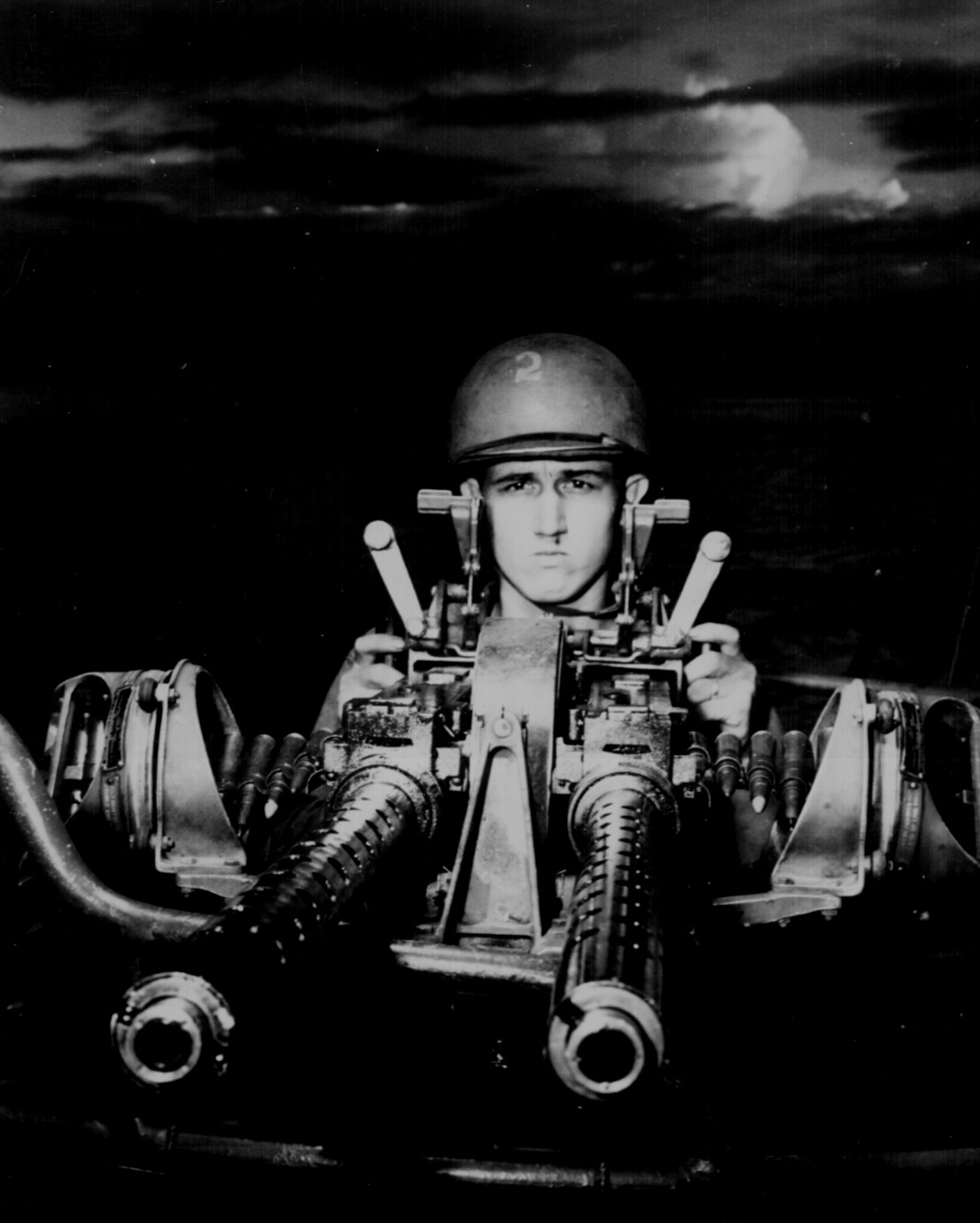
PT boat 50 cal. M2 Browning machine gun

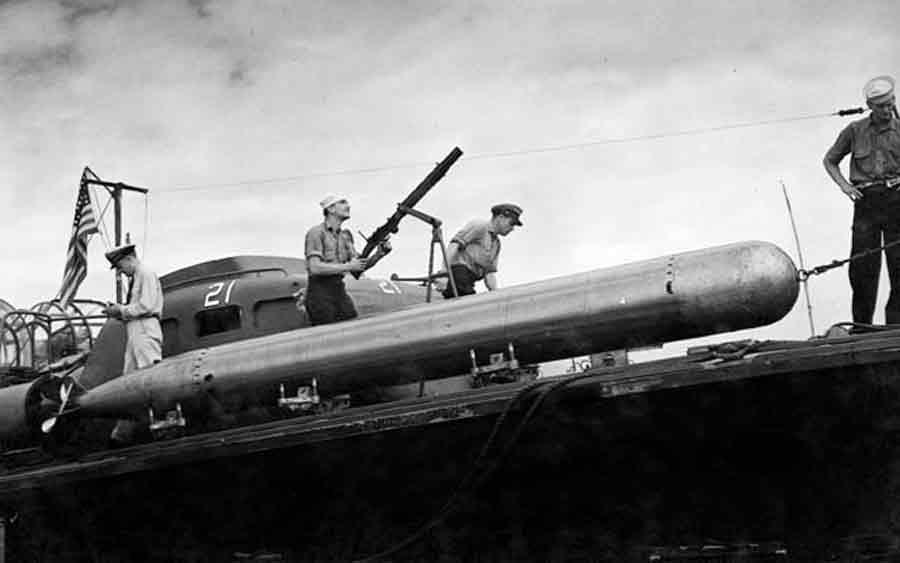
PT Mark 8 torpedo

== See also ==
- List of museum ships
- Patrol torpedo boat PT-617
- Motor torpedo boat PT-796
- Motor torpedo boat PT-105
- Motor torpedo boat PT-658
