= Summerfield =

Summerfield may refer to:

== Places ==
=== United Kingdom ===
- Summerfield, Birmingham, a district of Birmingham
- Summerfield Research Station, a munitions production site near Kidderminster, Worcestershire

=== United States ===
- Summerfield, Alabama
- Summerfield, Florida
- Summerfield, Illinois
- Summerfield, Kansas
- Summerfield, Louisiana
- Summerfield, Maryland
- Summerfield, Missouri
- Summerfield, North Carolina
- Summerfield, Ohio
- Summerfield, Texas
- Summerfield Township, Clare County, Michigan
- Summerfield Township, Monroe County, Michigan
- New Summerfield, Texas

=== Canada ===
- Summerfield, Prince Edward Island

== Other uses ==
- Summerfield (surname)
- Summerfield (film)
- Summer Fields School in Oxford, England, which at one time was called "Summerfield"
- Summerfield Schools, a school district in Michigan
- Summerfield School (disambiguation)
- Summerfield United Methodist Church in downtown Milwaukee, Wisconsin
- Summerfield Suites, a chain of hotels

== See also ==
- Somerfield (disambiguation)
- Summerville (disambiguation)
