= John D. Millett =

16th president of Miami University

John David Millett
- Born: March 4, 1912; Indianapolis, Indiana, US
- Died: November 14, 1993 (aged 81); Cincinnati, Ohio, US
- Years active: 1938-1972
- Known for: 16th president of Miami University, first chancellor of the Ohio Board of Regents

John David Millett (March 14, 1912 – November 14, 1993) was the 16th president of Miami University in Oxford, Ohio, and first chancellor of the Ohio Board of Regents. During his career, he served as the Senior Vice President of the Academy for Educational Development in Washington, D.C. Millett Hall at Miami University and an academic building at Wright State University in Dayton, Ohio, are named in his honor.

== Biography ==
John David Millett was born in Indianapolis, Indiana, of parents who had come from small towns in southwestern Indiana. He was the first of two children, the only son, born to Grover Allan Millett (1884–1953)and Helen Elizabeth (Welch) Millett (1886–1968). His father had been a successful businessman in the 1920s, but went bust in the Great Depression. Millett attended Indianapolis public schools and was graduated from Shortridge High School in 1929. He received a Rector Scholarship and entered DePauw University in Greencastle, Indiana, in 1929 and was graduated with highest honors in 1933. Widely recognized as a campus leader, he was editor of the school newspaper, Phi Beta Kappa, and president of his fraternity, Phi Delta Theta. After a year traveling around the world, he entered Columbia University as a graduate student in 1934 in political science with a specialty in public administration. On September 2, 1934, he married Catherine Letsinger of Bloomfield, Indiana, whom he had dated at DePauw and who was earning her degree in the School of Journalism at Columbia. He received his PhD in January 1938 at the age of 25 and spent one year as postdoctoral student at the London School of Economics. He returned to teaching at Columbia University in 1939. At the beginning of World War II, he joined the personal staff of Gen. Brehon B. Somervell, commander of the Army Service Forces, in the Pentagon (which Somervell had designed and built as the commander of the U.S. Army Corps of Engineers). He rose from the rank of major to full colonel and received the Legion of Merit for his military service.

After World War II, he returned to the graduate faculty of Columbia University, rising to the rank of tenured full professor. He returned to active duty in the Army in 1947 to study logistical management of the German Army during the war. He also served on the staff of the first Hoover Commission and various prestigious committees. Millett served as the 16th president of Miami University in Oxford, Ohio, from 1953 to 1964. He managed a vast expansion of the physical campus and a doubling of student enrollment. He also oversaw significant progress in the academic quality and national reputation of the university. He was a champion of the liberal arts education and instituted the Common Curriculum at Miami. He became the first chancellor of the Ohio Board of Regents, 1964–1972, enjoying a close working relationship with Governor James A. Rhodes. He delivered the presidential nomination address for Rhodes at the 1968 Republican National Convention. As chancellor he promoted the state's expanding network of technical and community colleges in addition to coordinating the state's expanding system of public universities. He was widely respected for his expertise in the financial management of higher education, long-term strategic planning, and best practices of public administration as applied to higher education.

John and Catherine Millett parented three sons: Allan R. Millett, PhD (military historian, university professor, and colonel, USMC); David P. Millett, M.D., (flight surgeon and FAA regional medical director); and Stephen M. Millett, PhD (historian, futurist, consultant, and member of the Ohio State Board of Education). Millett authored or coauthored nearly two dozen books and numerous professional journal articles in educational policy and public administration. His most acclaimed works included Financing Higher Education in the United States (1952), The Organization and Role of the Army Service Forces (1954), Management in the Public Service (1954), The Liberating Arts (1957), The Academic Community (1962), and Politics and Higher Education (1974). He was also particularly proud of his numerous honorary degrees from universities across the country.

Millett was a longtime affiliate of political science honors society Pi Sigma Alpha. He served as president, vice president, and executive council member of the society, and was also inducted into it as a college student at DePauw University.

Millett retired from public service in Ohio in 1972 and joined the executive leadership team at the Academy for Educational Development in Washington, D.C. He consulted with universities and educational institutions around the world. Also in 1972 he was elected President of the General Council of the Phi Delta Theta national organization. Millett was a trustee of the Educational Testing Service and the Institute for American Universities (Aix-en-Provence, France). He was active in the Cosmos Club, Rotary, and the United Methodist Church. He was elected the first chairman of the National Academy of Public Administration. He returned to live in Oxford, Ohio, in 1980. He suffered a severe heart attack in 1988 and subsequently died after a long illness at a retirement center in Cincinnati, Ohio.

Educational offices
Preceded by Ernest H. Hahne	President of Miami University; 1953 – 1964	Succeeded by Phillip R. Shriver
