= Peggy Somerville =

Margaret Scott Somerville
- Born: 2 June 1918; Ashford, Middlesex, England
- Died: 29 June 1975 (aged 57); Middleton, Suffolk, England
- Other name: Peggy Somerville
- Education: Royal Academy Schools
- Occupation: Painter

Margaret Scott Somerville (2 June 1918 – 29 June 1975) was a child prodigy who learned to paint at the same time she learned to talk.

== Biography ==
Somerville was born in Ashford in Middlesex to the artist and collector Charles Somerville and his wife Rose Annie, née Chantree.

When she was three some of her watercolours were selected for an exhibition held by the Royal Society of Drawing. At the age of seven one of her paintings, Happy Days by the Sea, was exhibited at the New Irish Salon in Dublin, having been chosen on merit by judges who knew nothing of her age.

Her first one-woman 'retrospective' was held when she was nine at the Claridge Gallery in London. She was hailed as a child genius by newspapers throughout Britain and as far away as Boston, and, in a matter of days, each one of the hundred paintings on show had sold. Yet despite her fame she was a very private person and after studying at the Royal Academy Schools for just a few months she gave up formal study and became a Land Girl.

== Adult life ==
In her adult life Somerville continued to paint and, during the early 1960s, she moved to Middleton, near Westleton in Suffolk. From here she made frequent excursions to the coast nearby, particularly Aldeburgh. An archetypal British Impressionist who made Suffolk her home and was able to continue to paint the things she loved: sunlight, landscapes, flowers and her family.

While in many ways she can be seen as continuing the tradition from Gainsborough, through Constable and Thomas Churchyard, to Wilson Steer, she was also deeply indebted to the French Impressionists, especially Bonnard. From 1964 until her early death she lived and worked in Suffolk painting vigorous oils, watercolours and pastels, her Aldeburgh paintings showing a rare sensuality and sensitivity.

After her early fame, her national reputation declined until she was rediscovered by art historian Stephen Reiss during the period he was managing the Aldeburgh Festival. Somerville is now recognised as one of the most interesting of the later British impressionists.

She died on 29 June 1975, after suffering from cancer.

Norfolk Museums Service holds a number of her works.
