= Sommerville =

Sommerville may refer to:

== Institutions ==
- Sommerville Manor School

== People ==
- Duncan Sommerville (1879-1934), Scottish and New Zealand mathematician
- George Sommerville, Scottish footballer
- Ian Sommerville (academic), British academic
- Ian Sommerville (technician), (fl. c. 1960s)
- James Sommerville, hornist for the Boston Symphony Orchestra

== Places ==
- Sommerville, alternative name for Somersville, California

== See also ==
- Somerville (disambiguation)
- Summerville (disambiguation)
