= USS Somerfield =

USS Somerfield (1861) was a Chesapeake Bay schooner purchased by the Union Navy at Baltimore, Maryland, on 13 August 1861 for the purpose of obstructing the North Carolina sounds.

== Destined for the "stone fleet" ==
Manned by her merchant crew of three sailors, Capt. North, master, and heavily laden with stone, the schooner sailed to Hampton Roads, Virginia, and proceeded on to Hatteras Inlet, North Carolina.

On 11 October, she was one of five schooners there in "pretty good condition." Four of these vessels – not identified – were being used as ships for the "Stone Fleet" of sunken obstructions in harbors and other waterways of the Confederate States of America. On 14 November 1861, three of these schooners – again unidentified – were sunk in the channel of Ocracoke Inlet, and she may have been one of them.

== See also ==
- Union Blockade
