= Patrol torpedo boat PT-305 =

Patrol vessel of the United States Navy

Coordinates: 30.040815°N 90.013170°W

History

United States
- Name: PT-305
- Builder: Higgins Industries, New Orleans
- Laid down: 30 March 1943
- Launched: 27 May 1943
- Commissioned: 8 December 1943
- In service: 22 December 1943
- Out of service: 15 November 1945
- Stricken: 28 November 1945
- Status: Museum ship

General characteristics
- Type: PT boat
- Displacement: 42 long tons (43 t)
- Length: 78 ft (24 m)
- Beam: 20.08 ft (6.12 m)
- Draft: 5.25 ft (1.60 m)
- Speed: 40 knots (74 km/h; 46 mph)
- Armament: 4 × 21 in (533 mm) torpedo tubes; 4 × .50 caliber machine guns; Mark 6 anti-submarine depth charges

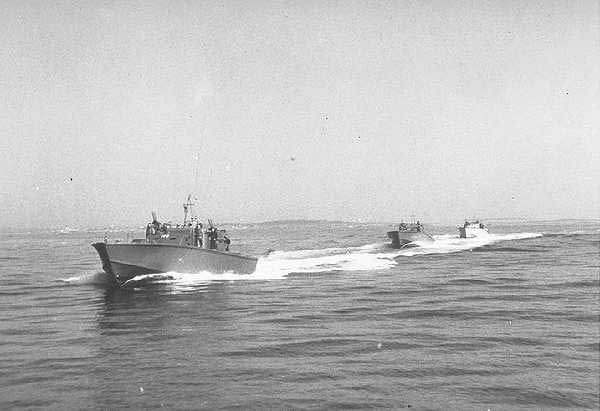
Patrol Torpedo boats

PT-305, also known as USS Sudden Jerk, is a 78-foot Higgins PT-200-class motor torpedo boat that served with Motor Torpedo Boat Squadron 22, assigned to the Mediterranean, based at Bastia, Corsica, and St. Tropez, France, where it participated in Allied invasions.

After World War II, the boat operated as a tour boat in New York City and as an oyster boat in the Chesapeake Bay. It was recovered and has been restored to its 1944 condition and is on display at The National WWII Museum in New Orleans.

== Specifications ==
source: The National WWII Museum

=== Higgins "78" PT boat specifications ===
| Length | 78 ft (24 m) |
| Beam | 20.08 ft (6.12 m) |
| Draft | 5.25 ft (1.60 m) |
| Weight | 43 tons (56 tons when fully armed and loaded) |
| Engines | 3 x Packard 1A-2500 V-12s (located mid-ship) |
| Speed | 40 knots (74 km/h; 46 mph) |
| Crew | 2x officers, 11x sailors |
