= Brehon B. Somervell =

United States Army general (1892–1955)

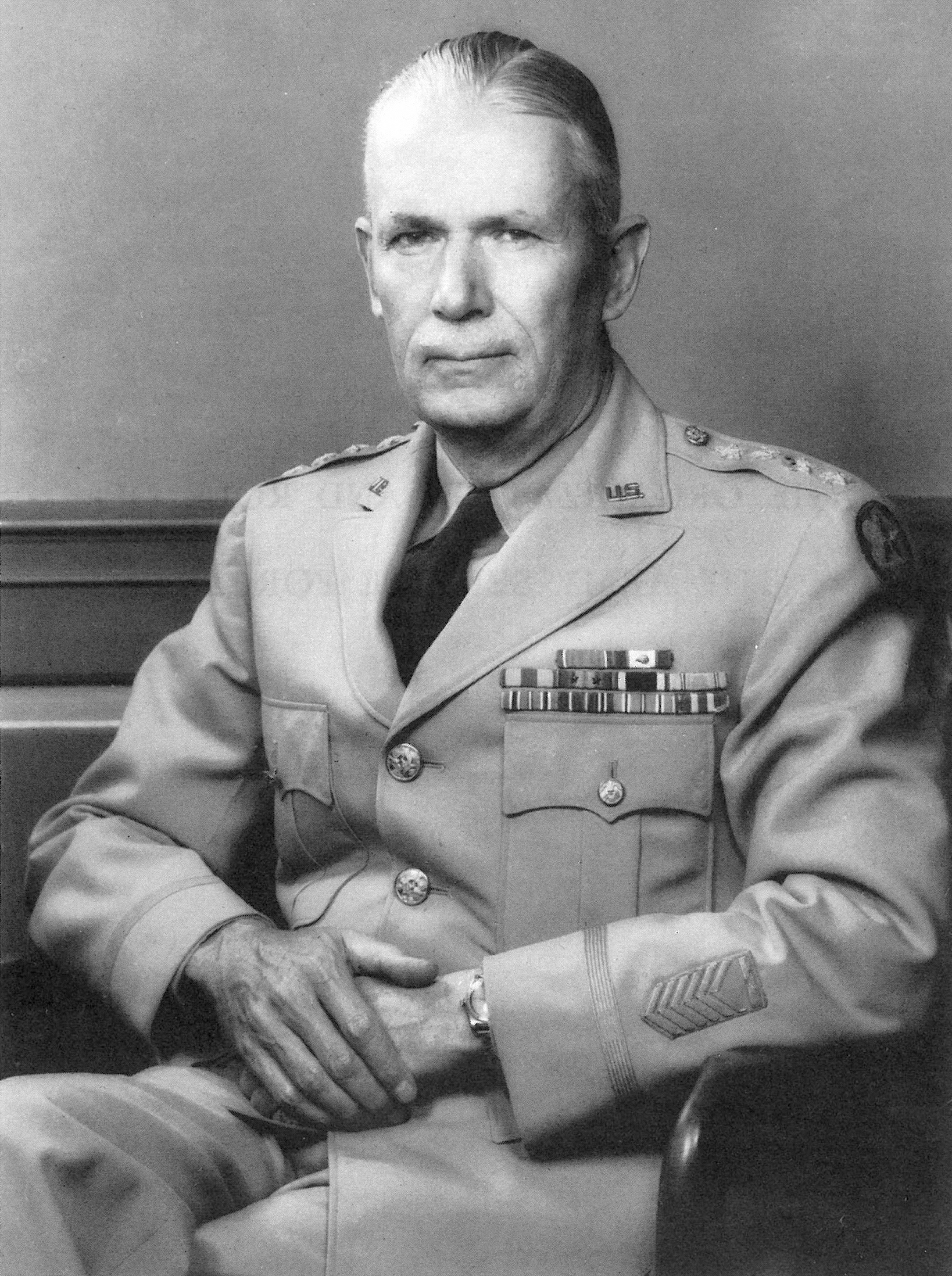
- Somervell on an undated photograph
- Born: Brehon Burke Somervell; 9 May 1892; Little Rock, Arkansas, United States
- Died: 13 February 1955 (aged 62); Ocala, Florida, United States
- Military career
- Allegiance: United States
- Branch: United States Army
- Service years: 1914–1946
- Rank: General
- Nickname: "Bill"
- Service number: 0-3665
- Unit: Corps of Engineers
- Commands: Army Service Forces
- Conflicts: Pancho Villa Expedition; World War I World War II
- Awards: Distinguished Service Cross; Army Distinguished Service Medal (3); Legion of Merit (2)
- Other work: President of Koppers

Brehon Burke Somervell (9 May 1892 – 13 February 1955) was a general in the United States Army and Commanding General of the Army Service Forces in World War II. As such he was responsible for the U.S. Army's logistics. Following his death, The Washington Post lauded him as "one of the ablest officers the United States Army has produced".

Somervell graduated near the top of his United States Military Academy class of 1914 and was commissioned in the United States Army Corps of Engineers. During World War I he served with the Pancho Villa Expedition in Mexico and the American Expeditionary Force in France in logistical posts. He was also decorated for gallantry in the Meuse-Argonne Offensive.

After the war he served in various engineering assignments. From 1936 to 1940 Somervell was head of the Works Progress Administration in New York City, where he was responsible for a series of Great Depression relief works, including the construction of LaGuardia Airport.

As head of the Construction Division of the Quartermaster Corps in 1941, Somervell took charge of the construction of a series of camps to house the large numbers of draftees entering the Army. Once again, Somervell was able to deliver vital projects on time. The most enduring of these projects was the Pentagon, which is today one of the most recognizable buildings in the world. From 1942 to 1945, Somervell commanded the Army Service Forces, the logistical arm of the United States Army.

== Early life ==
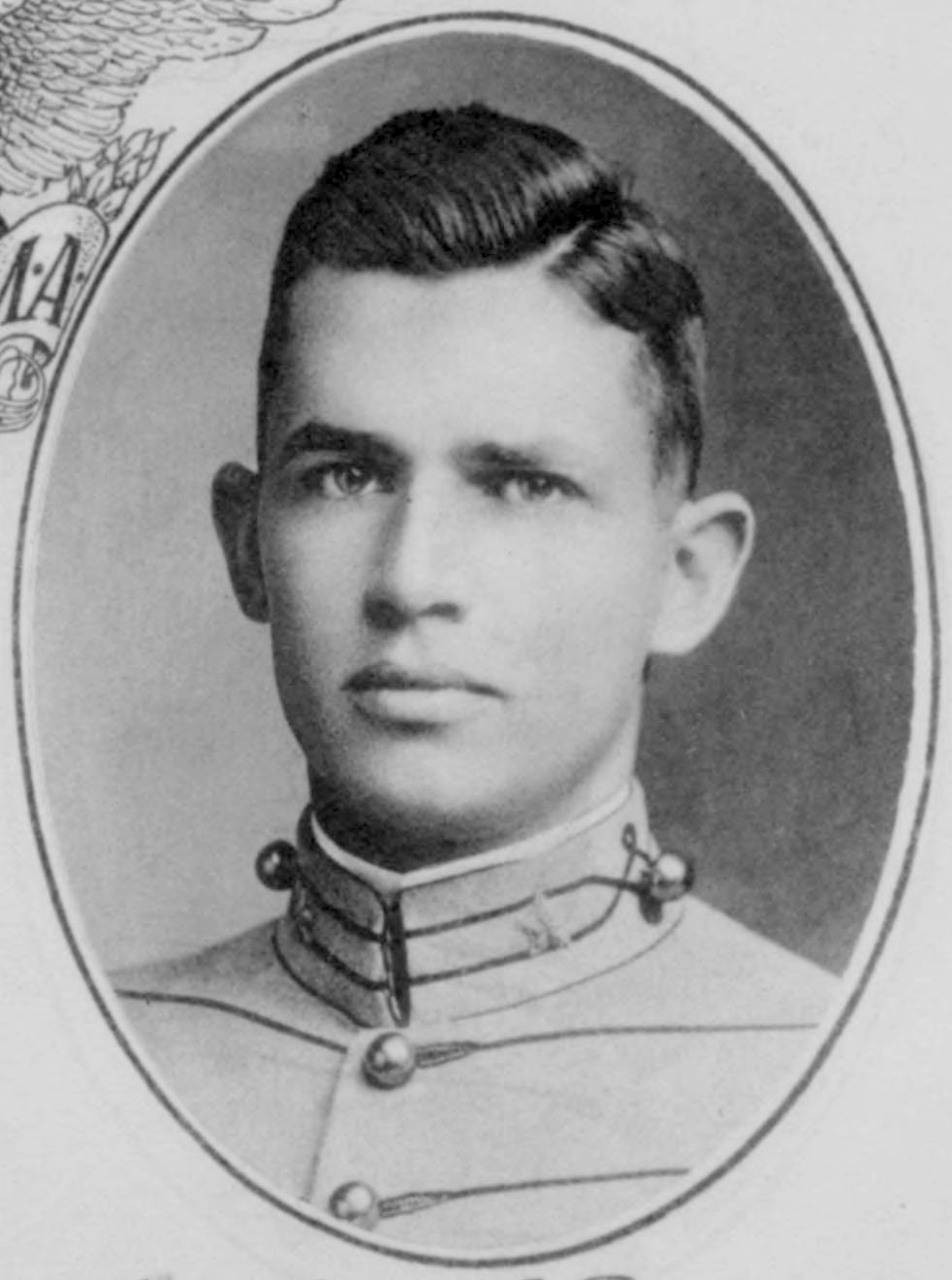
At West Point in 1914

Brehon Burke Somervell was born on 9 May 1892 in Little Rock, Arkansas, the only child of William Taylor Somervell, a physician, and wife Mary née Burke, a schoolteacher. The two of them opened Belcourt Seminary, a girls' finishing school in Washington, D.C., in 1906.

Somervell was appointed to the United States Military Academy at West Point, New York by Congressman Charles C. Reid of Arkansas. He entered West Point in 1910 and graduated sixth out of the 107 cadets in the class of 1914. Like other high-ranking cadets of the period, he was commissioned a second lieutenant in the United States Army Corps of Engineers. Fellow graduates included men such as William H. Holcombe, James B. Cress, Charles P. Gross, Robert W. Crawford, Dabney O. Elliott, Arthur R. Harris, LaRhett L. Stuart, John B. Anderson, Harry C. Ingles, James L. Bradley, John H. Woodberry, Harold F. Loomis, Carl Spaatz, Harold R. Bull, Charles M. Milliken, Joseph W. Byron, Paul C. Paschal, Francis R. Kerr, Vicente Lim, Sylvester D. Downs Jr., Orlando Ward, Benjamin G. Weir, Ralph Royce, William O. Ryan, Frank W. Milburn, John B. Thompson and Jens A. Doe. All of them would later rise to the rank of brigadier general or higher in their later military careers.

== World War I ==
Somervell traveled to Europe for his two months' graduation leave and was in Paris when World War I broke out. Reporting to the U.S. Embassy in Paris for volunteer duty, he became an assistant to the military attaché. He took charge of refugee funds and dispensed $1,000,000 to help American citizens to get back home.

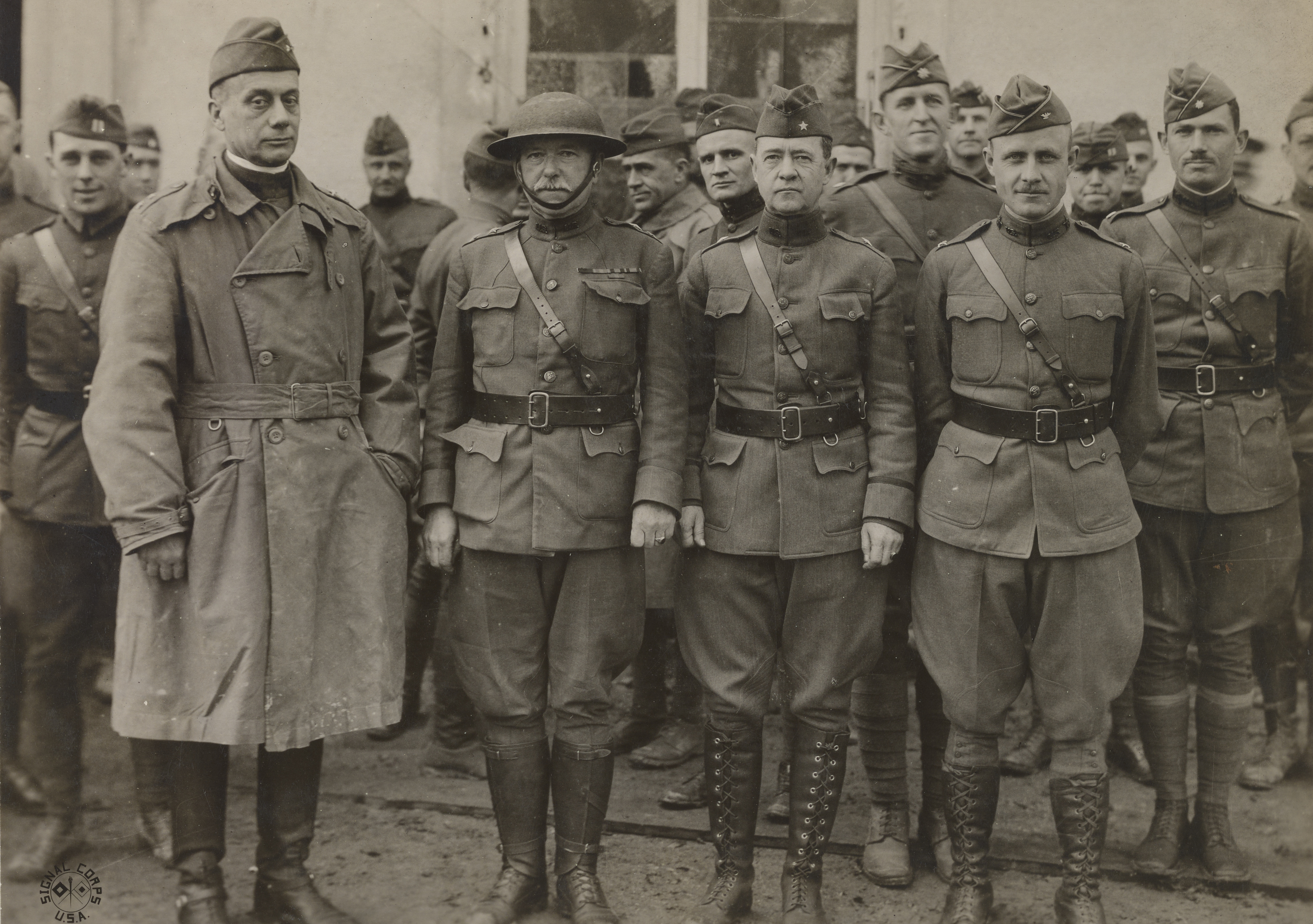
Senior officers of the 89th Division at Stenay, Meuse, France, 12 November 1918. Pictured on the extreme right is Lieutenant Colonel Brehon B. Somervell

On return to the United States, he was posted to an engineer battalion at Washington Barracks, DC. Scoring high marks in his Garrison Officers' School examinations, he was promoted to first lieutenant on 28 February 1915. During the Punitive Expedition into Mexico in 1916, he was for a time depot manager at Columbus, New Mexico, the main logistical base of the expedition. Later, he joined the expedition in Mexico, working on roads and as a supply officer.

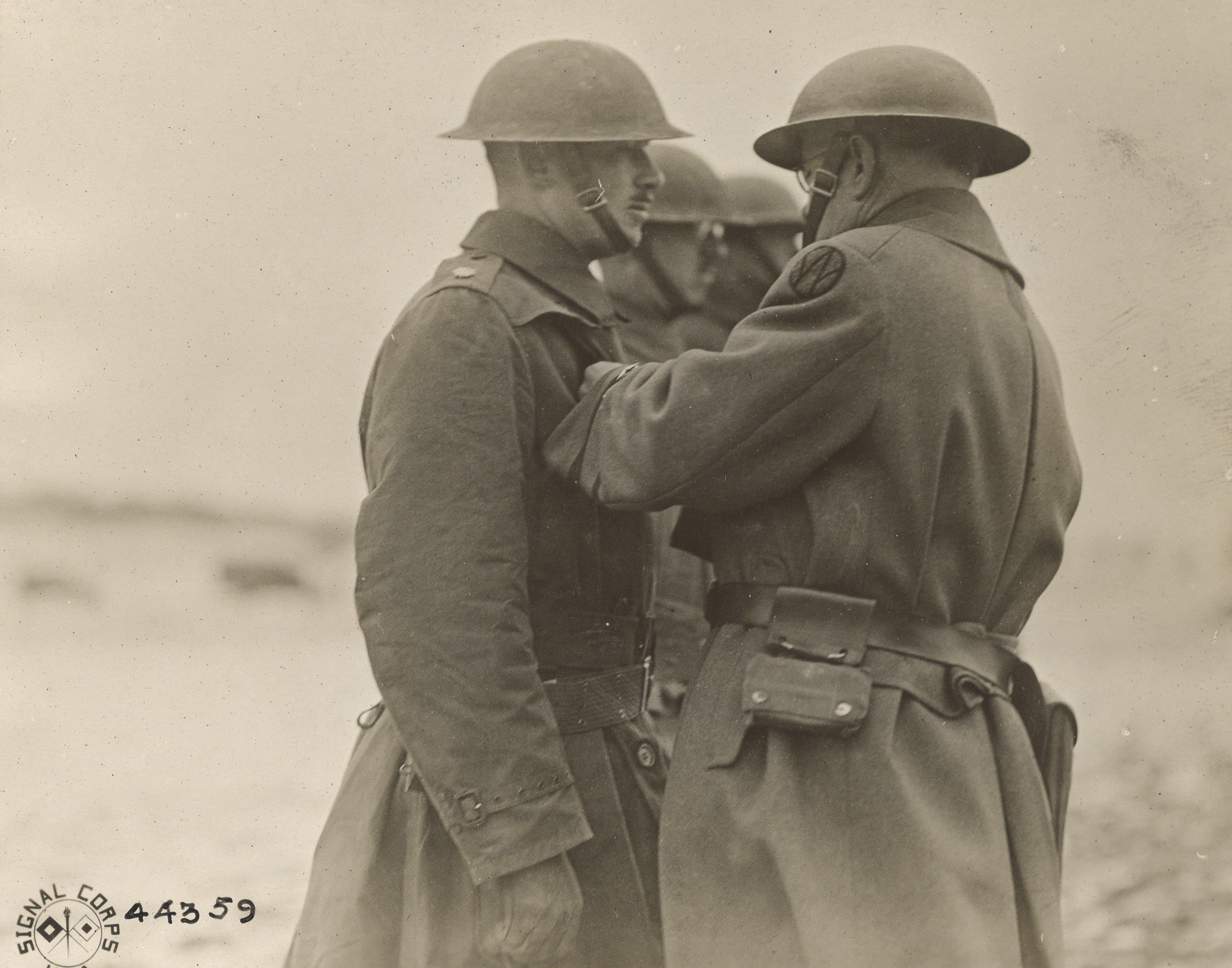
Lieutenant Colonel Brehon B. Somervell being decorated with the DSC by Major General Frank L. Winn at Nattenheim, Germany, December 1918

Somervell returned to Washington Barracks to attend the Engineer School but his course was interrupted by the declaration of war by the United States on Germany on 6 April 1917. The course was abruptly terminated and Somervell, along with hundreds of other junior officers, was ordered to appear before an examination board that would determine his fitness for promotion. Following a favorable report from the board, Somervell was promoted to captain on 15 May 1917. He helped organize the 15th Engineers, a rail transport unit, at Pittsburgh, Pennsylvania. In July 1917 this became the first engineer regiment to be sent overseas, arriving in England in July 1917 and France later that month. The 15th Engineers worked on several construction projects, including a munitions dump at Mehun-sur-Yèvre and an advanced depot and regulating station at Is-sur-Tille. Somervell got his projects completed by working his men around the clock and deploying every available resource regardless of the cost. For his role, Somervell was awarded the Army Distinguished Service Medal (DSM), the citation for which reads:

The President of the United States of America, authorized by Act of Congress, 9 July 1918, takes pleasure in presenting the Army Distinguished Service Medal to Lieutenant Colonel (Corps of Engineers) Brehon Burke Somervell (ASN: 0-3665), United States Army, for exceptionally meritorious and distinguished services to the Government of the United States, in a duty of great responsibility during World War I. As Adjutant, 15th Engineers, during the period of organization and training, in charge of construction of the Mehun Ammunition Depot, in charge of the construction at Is-sur-Tille Depot, including the Gas Depot at Poinson and the Etain Engine Terminal; Assistant Chief of Staff, G-3, and Assistant Chief of Staff, G-1, 89th Division from October 1918 until the division returned to the United States, when he was assigned as Assistant Chief of Staff, G-4, 3d Army. In all these positions Lieutenant Colonel Somervell displayed unusual vision, initiative, sound judgment, and high professional skill, contributing in a conspicuous way to the successful operation of the American forces in France.

He was promoted to major on 15 August 1917 and lieutenant colonel on 1 October 1918. While visiting some friends at the 89th Division, he volunteered his services to its chief of staff, Colonel John C. H. Lee, who accepted him as a temporary replacement for his Assistant Chief of Staff, G-3, (Note: Under the continental staff system adopted by the US Army during World War I, staff functions were numbered: G-1 for personnel; G-2 for intelligence; G-3 for operations; and G-4 for logistics. The Assistant Chief of Staff, G-4 headed the G-4 section of the headquarters. The term G-4 was used to designate both that officer and the section that he headed. See Staff (military) for more details.) in charge of operations, who had been captured a few days before. For leading a three-man patrol to inspect damage to a bridge some 600 yards (550 m) in front of American lines, Somervell was awarded the Distinguished Service Cross. The citation for the medal reads:

The President of the United States of America, authorized by Act of Congress, 9 July 1918, takes pleasure in presenting the Distinguished Service Cross to Lieutenant Colonel (Corps of Engineers) Brehon Burke Somervell (ASN: 0-3665), United States Army, for extraordinary heroism in action while serving with 89th Division, A.E.F., near Pouilly, France, 5–6 November 1918. Voluntarily serving on the staff of the 89th Division, Lieutenant Colonel Somervell conducted the first engineering reconnaissance of the damaged bridges at Pouilly, advancing more than 500 meters beyond the American outposts, crossing three branches of the Meuse River, and successfully reconnoitering the enemy.

He was one of only nine American officers, including Douglas MacArthur, Barnwell R. Legge, Sereno E. Brett or William J. Donovan, to have been awarded both the DSC and the Army DSM in the First World War. A few days later Lee arranged for Somervell to be permanently assigned to the 89th Division as the G-4 Supply Officer.

== Between the wars ==
Successful management depends on five factors. The first factor is a precise understanding of the job to be done. The second is qualified and capable men in key positions. The third is a workable organization properly adapted to the job to be done. The fourth is a simple, direct system for carrying on the activities involved in the job. The fifth is a positive method for checking on the results. Given any three of these five, a business or agency can probably function with fair success. four of them operating together will result in much better than average efficiency. however, it requires all five to create the best management obtainable.

— Brehon Somervell

The 89th Division returned to the United States in May 1919 but Somervell remained behind as Assistant Chief of Staff, G-4, in charge of supply, of the Third Army, and the American Forces in Germany, as it was re-designated on 2 July 1919. There, he met Anna Purnell, the daughter of a Chicago businessman, who was there as a YMCA volunteer. The two were married in August 1919. They had three children together, all daughters. While in Germany, Somervell also met Walker Hines, a prominent New York corporate lawyer, whom he assisted with a survey of shipping and navigation on the Rhine River. Somervell reverted to the permanent rank of major on 1 July 1920.

Returning to the United States in July 1920, Somervell was posted to the Office of the Chief of Engineers in Washington, D.C. His war record earned him a place at the U.S. Army Command and General Staff College at Fort Leavenworth, reserved for the Army's best and most promising officers, from August 1922 to June 1923. He once again ranked near the top of his class. After graduation he was posted to the 1st New York Engineer District but soon obtained leave to assist Hines with a special study of navigation on the Rhine and Danube Rivers on behalf of the League of Nations, essentially a continuation of the work that the two men had done in 1920. He then attended the Army War College from 1925 to 1926.

From 1926 to 1930 he was District Engineer, Washington, D.C. Engineer District. As such he became involved in a conflict between proponents of the development of hydroelectric power through damming the Great Falls of the Potomac River and the Maryland-National Capital Park and Planning Commission. Despite his advocacy, the falls remain undammed to this day. On 1 September 1930, Somervell was transferred to the Lower Mississippi Valley Division as Assistant Chief Engineer. The next year he became assistant to, and then the District Engineer of the Memphis District. In 1933, he teamed up with Hines again, for an economic survey of Turkey, which culminated in a seven-volume report. Named as District Engineer for Ocala, Florida, Somervell got behind a project to build the Cross Florida Barge Canal. Somervell was chosen to head the project but although President Franklin D. Roosevelt allocated emergency funds for the canal in 1935, opponents of the canal protested that it would cause seawater to seep into the groundwater, and work was stopped a year later. In the meantime, he was promoted to lieutenant colonel on 1 August 1935.

In 1935, Somervell was appointed as head of the Works Progress Administration in New York City. Over the next three and a half years he spent $10,000,000 a month on Great Depression relief works. The biggest project was the construction of what became LaGuardia Airport. Somervell established a reputation as a man who could handle projects involving hundreds of thousands of people and hundreds of millions of dollars. Early in his administration he worked to repair relations with labor unions and left-wing groups that had suffered under his strongly anti-Communist predecessor Victor F. Ridder. He stated he had no objection to picketing of WPA headquarters. He also downplayed talk of a "Red menace" in the New York WPA, once declaring that "I wouldn't know a Red if I saw one, and wouldn't do anything about it if I did."

Somervell's relations with WPA's arts program were particularly difficult. When Congress in 1940 required all WPA workers to sign a loyalty oath an increasingly anti-Communist Somervell ordered a deeper investigation of even those arts project workers who had signed the oath. He also began a program of censoring the content of WPA-financed murals and other art, giving instructions to "guard against anything in which the main idea is social content, rather than artistic value, and eliminate anything that may savor of propaganda, and to see that the project devotes itself to art and not politics". In his most controversial decision, in July 1940 he ordered the burning of three out of four murals on the history of aviation at Floyd Bennett Field in Brooklyn because of the inclusion of supposed Communist symbols.

== World War II ==
=== Construction Division ===
In 1940, the rapid expansion of the Army's strength from an authorized 174,000 to 1,400,000 strained the capacity of the Construction Division of the Quartermaster Corps. Headed by Brigadier General Charles D. Hartman and primarily concerned with peacetime maintenance, the organization floundered to meet the Chief of Staff of the United States Army, General George C. Marshall's deadline to have camps for arriving draftees completed within ninety days and was charged with "incompetence, ineptitude, and stupidity" by the press and Congress. In December 1940, Somervell became head of the Construction Division of the Quartermaster Corps, and was promoted to the temporary rank of brigadier general on 29 January 1941.

Based on his experience as a district engineer and with the WPA, Somervell rapidly reorganized the Construction Division. He reduced its eleven branches to five, and added two sections, a Public Relations Section and Control Section, the latter responsible for preparing statistics for reports and coordinating the work of other branches. By December, he had decentralized operations into nine territorial construction zones, each supervised by a constructing quartermaster responsible for all local problems.

Reasoning that time was more important than money, Somervell pushed the camp construction project through to completion. By February, with a workforce of 485,000 people employed on military construction projects, the job was completed on time but over $100 million over budget. He was also responsible for constructing new facilities to hold stores and munitions, for which $700 million was allocated by December 1940. By December 1941, 375 projects had been completed and 320 were still under way, with a total value of $1.8 billion. He accepted promotion to brigadier general in the Army of the United States on 14 February 1941 with the date of rank of 29 January 1941.

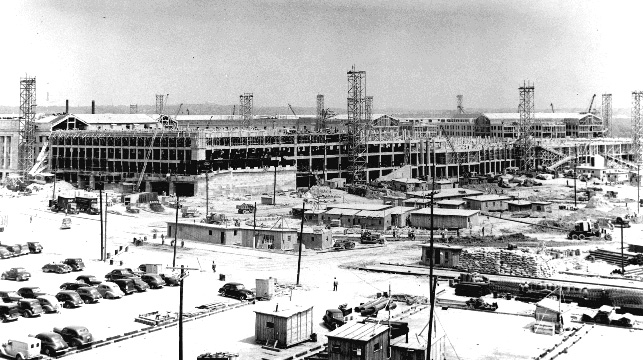
Northwest exposure of the Pentagon's construction underway, 1 July 1942

The best known of these projects was the Pentagon, an enormous office complex to house the War Department's 40,000-person staff together in one building. On the afternoon of Thursday, 17 July 1941, Somervell summoned George Bergstrom and Major Hugh Casey. Bergstrom was a former president of the American Institute of Architects; Casey a Corps of Engineers officer seconded to the Construction Division. The two had previously worked together closely on the design of cantonments. Somervell gave them until 9 a.m. on Monday morning to design the building, which he envisaged as a modern, four-story structure with no elevators on the site of the old Washington Hoover Airport. Over that "very busy weekend", Casey, Bergstrom and their staff roughed out the design for a four-story, five-sided structure with a floor area of 5,100,000 square feet (470,000 m^{2})—twice that of the Empire State Building. The estimated cost was $35 million. President Roosevelt subsequently moved the site of the building, over Somervell's objections, in order to prevent it being constructed in front of Arlington National Cemetery.

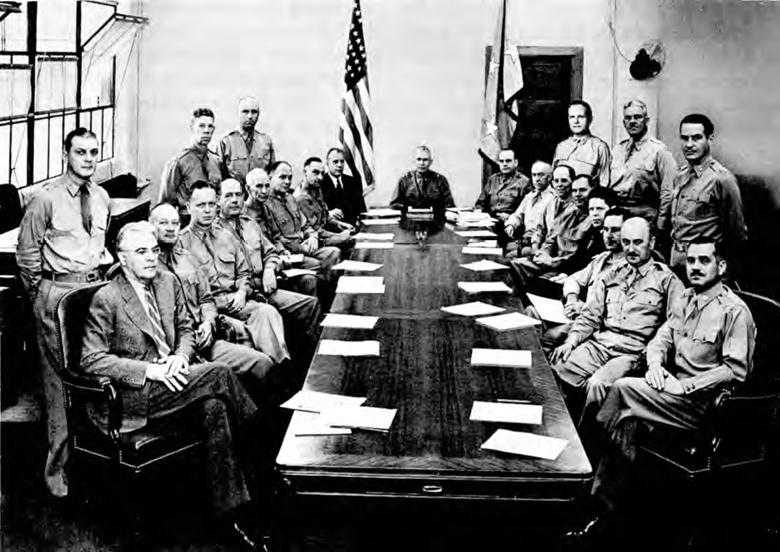
Weekly Staff Conference at United States Army Services of Supply (USASOS) headquarters in June 1942. Major General Brehon B. Somervell is sat at the head of the table

Somervell still pursued his own designs, making important changes, including the addition of a fifth story. The outbreak of war led to a new urgency, and by May 1942, some 13,000 workers were working around the clock on the building, which was completed in early 1943 at a cost of $63 million, the overrun being caused by the emphasis on speed and the addition of the extra floor. For his work with the Construction Division, Somervell was awarded an oak leaf cluster to his Distinguished Service Medal.

Somervell hoped to become Chief of Engineers but was "not really in the running", being too junior in rank. Instead, the job went to Brigadier General Eugene Reybold, the Assistant Chief of Staff, G-4 on the War Department General Staff. Somervell's post was abolished on the transfer of the Construction Division to the Corps of Engineers. Reybold, who considered Somervell "a firecracker but ruthless" who "didn't care who he hit", selected Brigadier General Thomas M. Robins to head the new Corps of Engineers Construction Division.

Somervell instead received Reybold's former assignment, with promotion to the temporary rank of major general on 28 January 1942 and was promoted to temporary lieutenant general on 9 March 1942. The posting was unusual because Somervell had never previously served on War Department General Staff. As Assistant Chief of Staff, G-4, Somervell pressed for the adoption of a comprehensive Army Supply Program that would set targets and priorities for all Army production. Such a program could be used as the basis for requests for appropriations, for expenditures, and for allocating scarce materials.

=== Army Service Forces ===
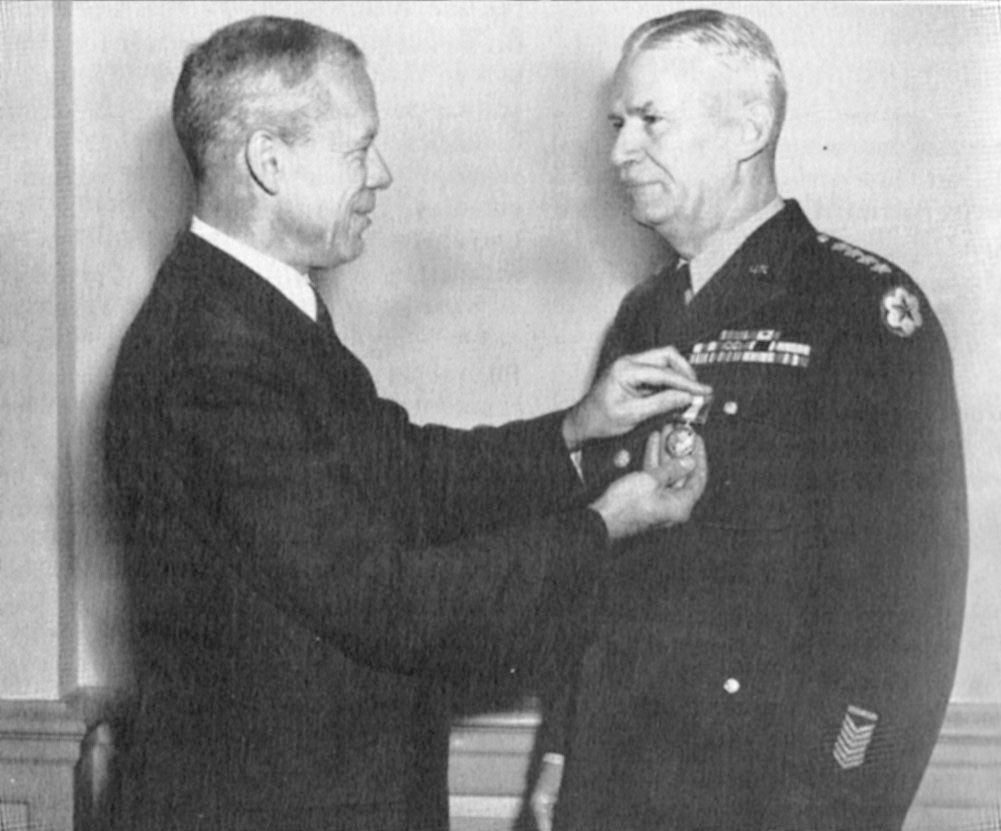
Secretary of War Robert P. Patterson awards Somervell his third Distinguished Service Medal in October 1945

Within weeks, Chief of Staff General George C. Marshall implemented sweeping changes to the War Department designed to reduce the number of people reporting to him so as to free his time for planning and conducting a global war. Three huge new commands were created by Executive Order Number 9082 of 28 February 1942, "Reorganizing the Army and the War Department": the Army Air Forces under Lieutenant General Henry H. Arnold, the Army Ground Forces under Lieutenant General Lesley J. McNair and the Services of Supply, under Somervell. As such, he was not only promoted to the rank of lieutenant general over the heads of many more senior officers, but some of them, including Reybold, now found themselves his subordinates. He was answerable to two men: Marshall, and Under Secretary of War Robert P. Patterson. Somervell built up a good working relationship with both. Senator Harry S. Truman of the Truman Committee disapproved of Somervell's cost overruns, declaring: "I will say this for General Somervell, he will get the stuff, but it is going to be hell on the taxpayer. He has a WPA attitude on the expenditure of money."

The Services of Supply was renamed the Army Service Forces in March 1943, as the term "supply" was felt to be too narrow a description of the broad range of logistic activities carried out by the organization. As head of Army Service Forces, Somervell became responsible for the implementation of the Army Supply Program. Somervell was on the cover of 15 June 1942 issue of Time and also of Life in an article written by Charles J. V. Murphy titled "Somervell of the S.O.S", on 8 May 1943 issue. According to military historian John D. Millett, who served on Somervell's Army Service Forces staff, Somervell was "impatient, tense, and decisive". Some saw him as an "empire-builder". Millett noted the opinion of an observer that:

In the jurisdictional wrangles that developed there was one argument ad hominem that was constantly used, to wit: that the A.S.F. and its dynamic Commanding General were constantly seeking as "Empire Builders" to enlarge their job by encroaching on that of others. By dint of repetition it got considerable acceptance inside the Department and out. There was something in the drive of the Commanding General of the A.S.F., his quickness on the mental trigger, his adroitness and his evident ambition to tackle tough jobs that in itself lent some support to this feeling of impending encroachment among those of a more deliberate pace. I should be surprised if the Chief of Staff ever had any such feeling though he must have been well aware of the feelings of others in his organization in this respect.

A 1943 attempt by Somervell to abolish the Technical Services failed amid the furor and panic created by false rumors that he was being considered for the post of chief of staff if Marshall was sent to Europe to command the Supreme Headquarters Allied Expeditionary Force. Somervell sometimes pushed extravagant white elephant projects, such as the Canol Road, which he continued long after the strategic imperative behind it had faded.

When Somervell's retirement was announced in December 1945, Secretary of War Robert P. Patterson issued a press release that read:

In organizing and directing the worldwide supply lines on which our troops depended for their offensive power, General Somervell performed a service without parallel in military history. He was completely dedicated to the task of winning the war in the shortest possible time and with the smallest cost in America lives, and the energy and ability he applied to his task contributed in great measure to the force of our attack and the speed of our victory.

== Later life and legacy ==
Somervell retired from the Army on 30 April 1946 and moved to Ocala, Florida. His wife Anna had died in January 1942, and he had married Mrs. Louise Hampton Wartmann, a former student at Belcourt, in March 1943. Somervell accepted an offer to become president of Koppers, a Pittsburgh-based company that mined coal and manufactured and sold coal-based products. Applying the same managerial techniques that he had employed in the Army, he thoroughly reorganized the company, and doubled revenues and tripled profits over the next five years.

Somervell suffered a series of health problems in the 1950s. He had an appendectomy in 1953 and a hernia operation in 1954. He suffered a severe heart attack in September 1954 and returned to his home in Ocala to recuperate. In early 1955 he decided to resign as president and withdraw from day-to-day operations. He had a second, fatal heart attack at his home on 13 February 1955. He was buried in Arlington National Cemetery, not far from his "brain child", the Pentagon. His other great creation, the Army Service Forces, did not survive, being abolished in May 1946. The Washington Post lauded him as "one of the ablest officers the United States Army has produced". General Marshall, speaking in later years, said of him:""He was one of the most efficient officers I have ever seen ... [he] got things done in Calcutta as fast as he did in the meadows around the Pentagon. Whenever I asked him for something he did it and got it". Marshall went on to say, "if I went into control in another war, I would start looking for another General Somervell the very first thing I did and so would anybody else who went through that struggle on this side".

The USAT General Brehon B. Somervell, a US Army Logistics Support Vessel based in Yokohama, Japan that can carry up to 2,000 short tons (1,800 t) of cargo, is named in his honor.

== Orders, decorations and medals ==
Below is the ribbon bar of General Brehon B. Somervell:

1st Row	Distinguished Service Cross		Army Distinguished Service Medal with two oak leaf clusters
2nd Row	Legion of Merit with oak leaf cluster	Mexican Service Medal	World War I Victory Medal with two campaign clasps
3rd Row	Army of Occupation of Germany Medal	American Defense Service Medal	American Campaign Medal
4th Row	Asiatic–Pacific Campaign Medal	European-African-Middle Eastern Campaign Medal with three campaign stars	World War II Victory Medal
5th Row	Army of Occupation Medal	Knight Commander of the Order of the British Empire	Grand Officer of the Legion of Honor (France)
6th Row	French Croix de guerre 1939-1945 with Palm	Order of Yun Hui, Grand Cross (Republic of China)	Medal of La Solidaridad (Panama)

== Dates of rank ==
Insignia	Rank	Component	Date
No insignia	Cadet	United States Military Academy	1 March 1910
No insignia in 1914	Second lieutenant	Regular Army	12 June 1914
	First lieutenant	Regular Army	28 May 1915
	Captain	Regular Army	15 May 1917
	Major	Temporary	5 August 1917
	Lieutenant colonel	Regular Army	1 October 1918
	Major	Regular Army	1 July 1920
	Lieutenant colonel	Regular Army	1 August 1935
	Brigadier general	Army of the United States	29 January 1941
	Major general	Army of the United States	28 January 1942
	Lieutenant general	Army of the United States	9 March 1942
	Colonel	Regular Army	1 July 1942
	Brigadier general	Regular Army	1 September 1943
	Major general	Regular Army	3 September 1943
	General	Army of the United States	6 March 1945
	Major general	Retired List	30 April 1946
	General	Retired List	4 June 1948

== General and cited references ==
- Ancell, R. Manning; Miller, Christine (1996). The Biographical Dictionary of World War II Generals and Flag Officers: The US Armed Forces. Westport, Connecticut: Greenwood Press. ISBN 0-313-29546-8.
- Cullum, George W. (1920). Biographical Register of the Officers and Graduates of the US Military Academy at West Point New York since its Establishment in 1802: Supplement Volume VI 1910–1920. Chicago, Illinois: R. R. Donnelly and Sons, The Lakeside Press.
- Cullum, George W. (1930). Biographical Register of the Officers and Graduates of the US Military Academy at West Point New York since its Establishment in 1802: Supplement Volume VII 1920–1930. Chicago, Illinois: R. R. Donnelly and Sons, The Lakeside Press.
- Fine, Lenore; Remington, Jesse A. (1972). The Corps of Engineers: Construction in the United States. Washington, D.C.: United States Army Center of Military History.
- Millett, John D. (1954). The Organization and Role of the Army Service Forces. Washington, DC: Office of the Chief of Military History, Department of the Army. Archived from the original on 20 June 2008.
- Ohl, John Kennedy (1994). Supplying the Troops: General Somervell and American Logistics in World War II. DeKalb, Illinois: Northern Illinois Press. ISBN 0-87580-185-4.
- Smith, R. Elberton (1959). The Army and Economic Mobilization. Washington, DC: Office of the Chief of Military History, Department of the Army. ISBN 0-16-023939-7.
- Vogel, Steve (2007). The Pentagon: A History: The Untold Story of the Wartime Race to Build the Pentagon—and to Restore it Sixty Years Later. New York: Random House. ISBN 978-0-8129-7325-9.
- Wertheim, Eric (2007). The Naval Institute Guide to Combat Fleets of the World: their Ships, Aircraft, and Systems. Annapolis: Naval Institute Press. ISBN 9781591149552. OCLC 140283156.
