= USAV General Brehon B. Somervell =

American logistics support vessel

General Brehon B. Somervell
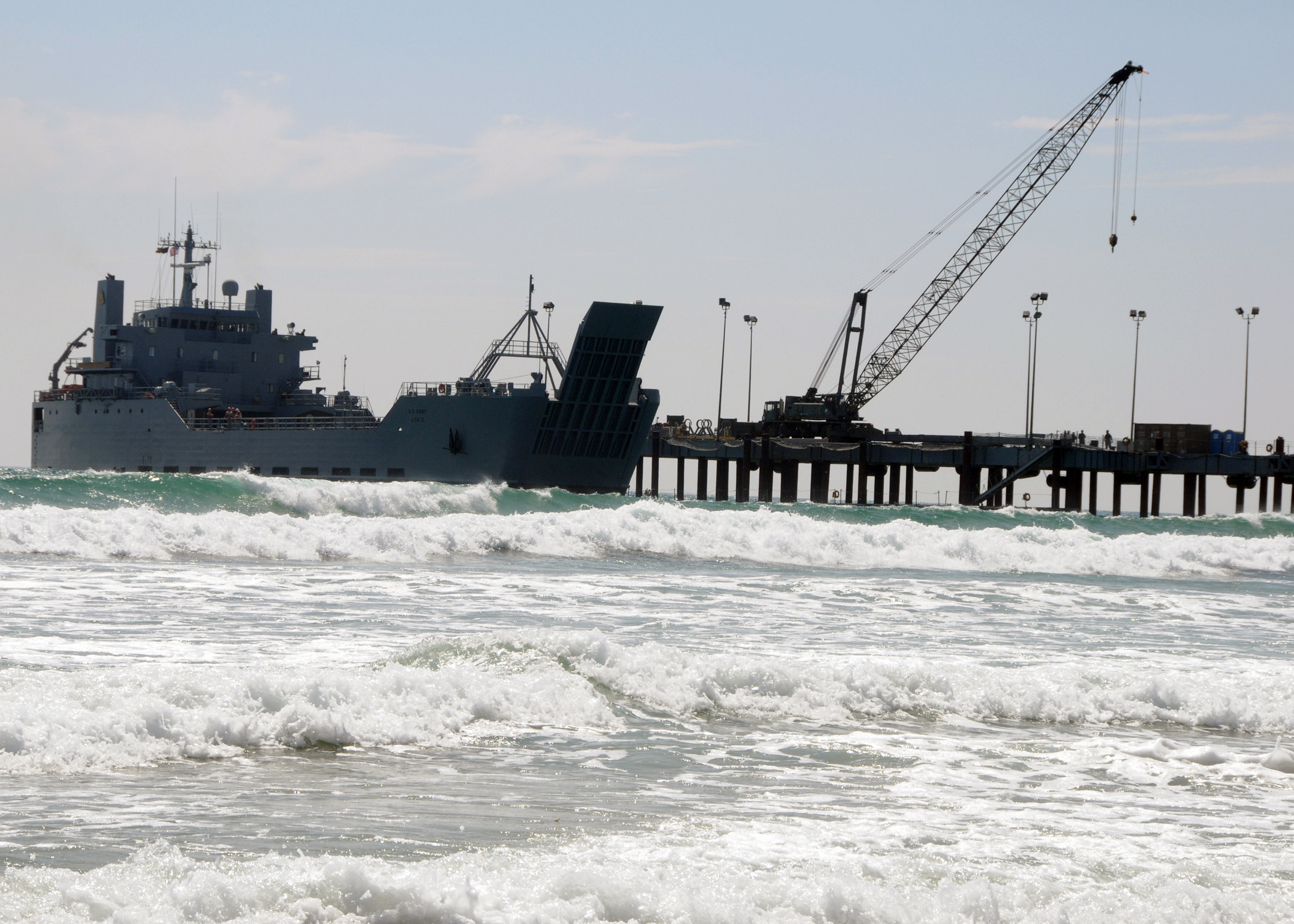
- USAV Gen. Brehon B. Somervell (LSV 3) approaches the surf zone as it comes alongside the elevated causeway system at Red Beach

History

United States
- Namesake: Brehon B. Somervell
- Builder: VT Halter Marine, Gulfport, Mississippi
- Acquired: 19 September 1987
- Home port: Joint Base Pearl Harbor Hickam (JBPHH) Honolulu, HI
- Identification: MMSI number: 368729000; Callsign: AAEE
- Status: in active service, as of 2025

General characteristics
- Type: Logistics Support Vessel
- Displacement: 4,199 long tons (4,266 t)
- Length: 273 ft (83 m)
- Beam: 60 ft (18 m)
- Draft: 12 ft (3.7 m)
- Propulsion: 2 × EMD 16-645E2; 1,950 hp (1,450 kW) each
- Speed: 12.5 kn (23.2 km/h; 14.4 mph) (light); 11.5 kn (21.3 km/h; 13.2 mph) (loaded)
- Range: 8,200 nmi (15,200 km; 9,400 mi) (light); 6,500 nmi (12,000 km; 7,500 mi) (loaded)
- Complement: 8 warrant officers, 23 enlisted

USAV General Brehon B. Somervell (LSV-3) is a General Frank S. Besson-class logistics support vessel. The ship was built by VT Halter Marine, (formerly Moss Point Marine) of Gulfport, Mississippi. It is named for General Brehon B. Somervell, the Commanding General of the United States Army Service Forces in World War II.

The vessel is currently home-ported in Joint Base Pearl Harbor Hickam (JBPHH), Hawai’i and is assigned to the 8th Special Troops Battalion, 8th Theater Sustainment Command

In 1994 the vessel transported Save the PT Boat, Inc.'s PT-658 up the Columbia River to Portland, Oregon.

The vessel is currently planned to be retired from service in 2029.
