= William Somerville (priest) =

William Somerville was Archdeacon of Armagh from 1426 to 1427:

He was appointed Rector of Phillipstown in 1430 and a Canon of Armagh from 1440 to 1455.
