= Annis Somerville =

New Zealand judge

Judge
- In office 2 March 2001 – 2017

Annis Somerville is a retired New Zealand judge. She was the first judge of Māori descent to be appointed to the Family Court of New Zealand.

== Biography ==
Somerville was born in Lawrence, Central Otago and attended school in Oamaru. She studied anthropology, philosophy and Russian studies at the University of Otago. She then trained as a school teacher and taught for two years, including one year at Otumoetai Intermediate School in 1973. Somerville decided to enrol for law studies when her older brother started studying law.

Somerville was admitted to the bar in 1978, and initially worked for a private law firm. In 1987 she set up her own all-women barristers and solicitors practice. Somerville served as Chair of the Family Law Section Executive and as a member of the Law Practitioners' Disciplinary Tribunal. She was appointed a Family Court judge on 2 March 2001 and served for 16 years in Tauranga and Rotorua before retiring in 2017.

Somerville is a fellow and vice chair of Knox College and founding member and an honorary life member of the Otago Women's Law Society. In 1996 she was president of the Otago District Law Society. She was also a founding member and president of the NZ Association of Women Judges until 2016. In addition, she is an adviser to the Dunedin Community Law Centre, a sexual harassment assessor for the Presbyterian Church, Honorary Solicitor for the Otago Foster Parents' Association and a management committee member of Nga Toko Amo Education and Wellness Centre.

== Personal life ==
Somerville has Ngāi Tahu and Scottish descent. In 1998, Somerville married fellow lawyer Peter Rollo. Rollo was also appointed a judge, in 2000; they became the first husband and wife judiciary officers in New Zealand.
