= Summerville =

Summerville may refer to:

in Canada

- Summerville, Newfoundland and Labrador, a settlement in Newfoundland
- Summerville, Yarmouth County, Nova Scotia, a community

in South Africa

- Summerville, Western Cape, a suburb of Kraaifontein

in the United States

- Summerville, former name of Somersville, California, United States
- Summerville, Georgia, city in Chattooga County, Georgia
  - Summerville Commercial Historic District
  - Summerville station
- Summerville (Augusta, Georgia), neighborhood and historic district in Augusta, Richmond County, Georgia
- Summerville, Oregon, a city in Union County, Oregon
- Summerville, Pennsylvania, a borough in Jefferson County, Pennsylvania
- Summerville, South Carolina, a town mostly in Dorchester County, South Carolina

== See also ==
- Sommerville (disambiguation)
- Summerfield (disambiguation)
- Summersville (disambiguation)
