= List of United States Military Academy alumni =

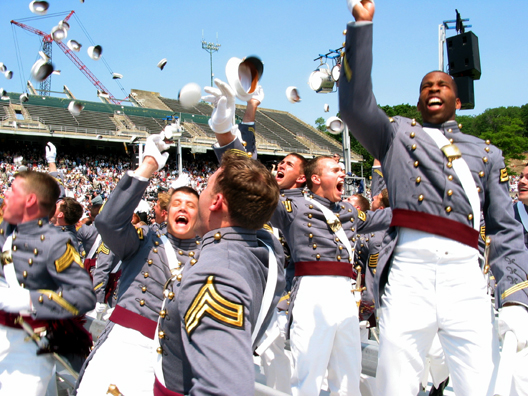
Traditional hat toss anniversary graduation ceremony at the United States Military Academy in June 2002

Logo of the Military Academy

The United States Military Academy (USMA) is an undergraduate college in West Point, New York with the mission of educating and commissioning officers for the United States Army. The academy was founded in 1802 and is the oldest of the United States' five service academies. It is also referred to as West Point (the name of the military base that the academy is a part of). The academy graduated its first cadet, Joseph Gardner Swift, in October 1802. Sports media refer to the academy as "Army" and the students as "Cadets"; this usage is officially endorsed. The football team is also known as "The Black Knights of the Hudson" and "The Black Knights". A small number of graduates each year choose the option of cross-commissioning into the United States Air Force, United States Navy, or the United States Marine Corps. Before the founding of the United States Air Force Academy in 1955, the academy was a major source of officers for the Air Force and its predecessors. Most cadets are admitted through the congressional appointment system. The curriculum emphasizes the sciences and engineering fields.

The list is drawn from graduates, non-graduate former cadets, current cadets, and faculty of the Military Academy. Notable graduates include 2 American Presidents, 4 additional heads of state, 20 astronauts, 76 Medal of Honor recipients (more than any other service academy or undergraduate institution), 70 Rhodes Scholars, and 3 Heisman Trophy winners. Among American universities, the academy is fourth on the list of total winners for Rhodes Scholarships, seventh for Marshall Scholarships and fourth on the list of Hertz Fellowships.

"Class year" refers to the alumni's class year, which usually is the same year they graduated. However, in times of war, classes often graduate early. For example, there were two classes in 1943 – January 1943 and June 1943.

== Academia ==
| Name | Class year | Notability | References |
|---|---|---|---|
| Horace Webster | 1818 | Lieutenant; mathematics professor at the Academy (1818–1825); professor of mathematics, professor of intellectual philosophy, and president at Geneva College (1828–1830, 1835–1836); president Free Academy of New York (1848–1869) | |
| Dennis Hart Mahan | 1824 | Lieutenant; military theorist, educator, author, and engineer; founding member of National Academy of Sciences; father of American naval historian and theorist Rear Admiral Alfred Thayer Mahan; of his other four children, son Frederick August Mahan graduated from the Academy in 1867 | |
| Alexander Dallas Bache | 1825 | Lieutenant; founding president of the National Academy of Sciences; member of the Scientific Lazzaroni and the Royal Society; professor of natural philosophy and chemistry at the University of Pennsylvania (1828–1843) | |
| Leonidas Polk | 1827 | Second lieutenant USA, lieutenant general in Confederate States Army; resigned his commission soon after graduating from the academy to enter Virginia Theological Seminary; founder of University of the South; killed in combat during the Battle of Marietta; Fort Polk named in his honor | |
| Andrew A. Humphreys | 1831 | Major General; American Civil War; topographical and hydrological surveyor of the Mississippi River Delta; Chief of Engineers (1866–1875); an incorporator of the United States National Academy of Sciences | |
| William Augustus Norton | 1831 | Lieutenant; Black Hawk War; professor of natural philosophy and civil engineering (1831–1883); member of the United States National Academy of Sciences | |
| Benjamin Stoddert Ewell | 1832 | Colonel in Confederate States Army; professor of mathematics and natural philosophy at Hampden-Sydney College (1839–1846); president of The College of William & Mary (1854–1888); brother Richard S. Ewell, class of 1840, was a lieutenant general in Confederate States Army | |
| Francis Henney Smith | 1833 | Major General in Confederate States Army; first and longest-serving superintendent of Virginia Military Institute (1839–1889) | |
| Montgomery C. Meigs | 1836 | Major General; Quartermaster General during American Civil War; river and civil engineer; early member of National Academy of Sciences; General Montgomery Meigs, class of 1967, is his descendant | |
| William Gilham | 1840 | Colonel in Confederate States Army; Seminole War and Mexican–American War; professor at Virginia Military Institute; author of Manual of Instruction for the Volunteers and Militia of the United States, which was in use for over 145 years | |
| Bushrod Johnson | 1840 | Major General in Confederate States Army; Seminole War and Mexican–American War; served with distinction in many key battles such as the Battle of Chickamauga and Siege of Petersburg; professor of philosophy, chemistry, and engineering; co-chancellor of the University of Nashville (1870–1875) | |
| Josiah Gorgas | 1841 | Captain USA, brigadier general in Confederate States Army; Mexican–American War; chief of ordnance for the Confederacy; president of University of Alabama (1878-1883); son William C. Gorgas became Surgeon General of the United States Army | |
| Henry L. Eustis | 1842 | Brigadier General; American Civil War; founded the Lawrence Scientific School, later the Harvard School of Engineering and Applied Sciences | |
| Daniel Harvey Hill | 1842 | Lieutenant General in Confederate States Army; professor at Washington and Lee University and Davidson College; later the first president of the University of Arkansas (1877–1884) | |
| Edmund Kirby Smith | 1845 | Major USA, General CSA; Mexican–American War; Confederate commander of the Trans-Mississippi Department; president of University of Nashville (1870-1875); professor of mathematics at Sewanee: The University of the South in Sewanee, Tennessee (1875-1893) | |
| Stonewall Jackson | 1846 | Major in United States Army, lieutenant general in Confederate States Army; Mexican–American War; professor of natural and experimental philosophy and artillery at Virginia Military Institute (1851–1861); excelled in several battles during the American Civil War, including the First Battle of Bull Run where he received his nickname; accidentally shot by his own troops at the Battle of Chancellorsville and died of complications from pneumonia eight days later | |
| Oliver Otis Howard | 1854 | Major General; recipient of the Medal of Honor for his actions leading an attack at the Battle of Seven Pines despite wound which resulted in the loss of his right arm; led the campaign against Chief Joseph and the Nez Perce tribe; founder of Howard University; Superintendent of the Academy (1881–1882) | |
| George Washington Custis Lee | 1854 | First Lieutenant US Army, Major General CSA; graduated first in his class at the Academy; father Robert E. Lee, class of 1829, graduated second in his class; President, Washington and Lee University (1871–1897) | |
| Stephen D. Lee | 1854 | First Lieutenant USA, Lieutenant General CSA; Seminole Wars, American Indian Wars; youngest Lieutenant General in the Confederate States Army; first president of Agricultural and Mechanical College of Mississippi (1880-1899) | |
| Alexander S. Webb | 1855 | Major General; recipient of the Medal of Honor for his actions at the Battle of Gettysburg for personal bravery and leadership repulsing Pickett's Charge; president of the City College of New York (1869–1902) | |
| Winfield Scott Chaplin | 1870 | Chancellor of Washington University in St. Louis (1891–1907); Dean of the Lawrence Scientific School at Harvard University; Faculty member at Maine State College, Imperial University in Tokyo, and Union College | |
| John Wilson Ruckman | 1883 | Major General; a founder of the Journal of the United States Artillery; invented several artillery devices used during World War I; instructor at School of Submarine Defense | |
| Dwight D. Eisenhower | 1915 | General of the Army; trained tank crews in Pennsylvania during World War I; World War II; commander of European Theater of Operations and Supreme Headquarters Allied Expeditionary Force (1942–1945); 1st Military Governor of American Occupation Zone in Germany (1945); President of Columbia University (1948–1950, 1952–1953); 1st Supreme Allied Commander Europe (1951–1952); 34th President of the United States (1953–1961) | |
| Robert F. McDermott | 1943 | Brigadier General; World War II fighter pilot; executive of United Services Automobile Association (USAA); first Dean of Faculty at the United States Air Force Academy | |
| Wesley Posvar | 1946 | Brigadier General in the Air Force; first US Air Force officer to be granted a Rhodes Scholarship; 15th chancellor of the University of Pittsburgh (1967–1991), where Posvar Hall is named in his honor | |
| James R. Allen | 1948 | General in the Air Force; fighter pilot in Korean War and Vietnam War; superintendent of United States Air Force Academy (1974–1977) | |
| Charles R. Hamm | 1956 | Lieutenant General in the Air Force; fighter pilot in Vietnam War; member of the Air Force air demonstration squadron, the Thunderbirds (1964–1966); superintendent of United States Air Force Academy (1987–1991) | |
| Robert Ivany | 1970 | Major General; Vietnam War and Gulf War veteran; former president of the U.S. Army War College (2001–2004); president of University of Saint Thomas (2004–present) | |
| John Mearsheimer | 1970 | Served five years as an Air Force officer; political science professor at University of Chicago (1982–present), where he is the R. Wendell Harrison Distinguished Service Professor of Political Science and the co-director of the Program on International Security Policy; proponent of offensive realism | |

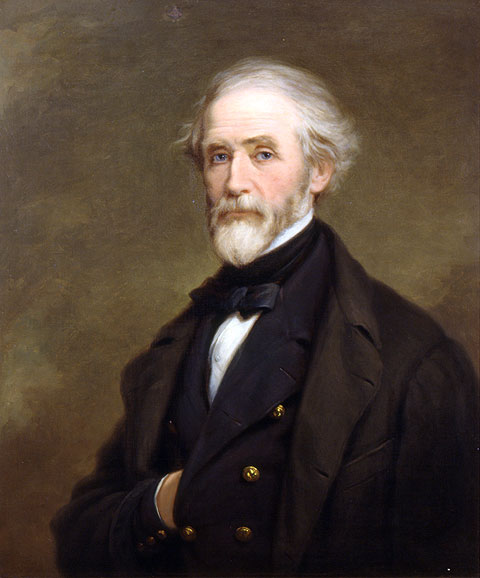
Dennis Hart Mahan

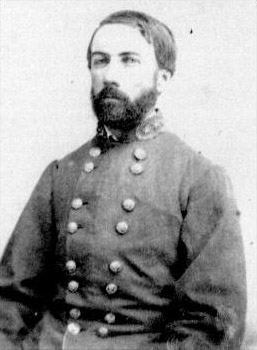
Daniel H. Hill

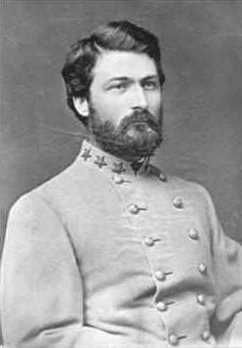
Custis Lee

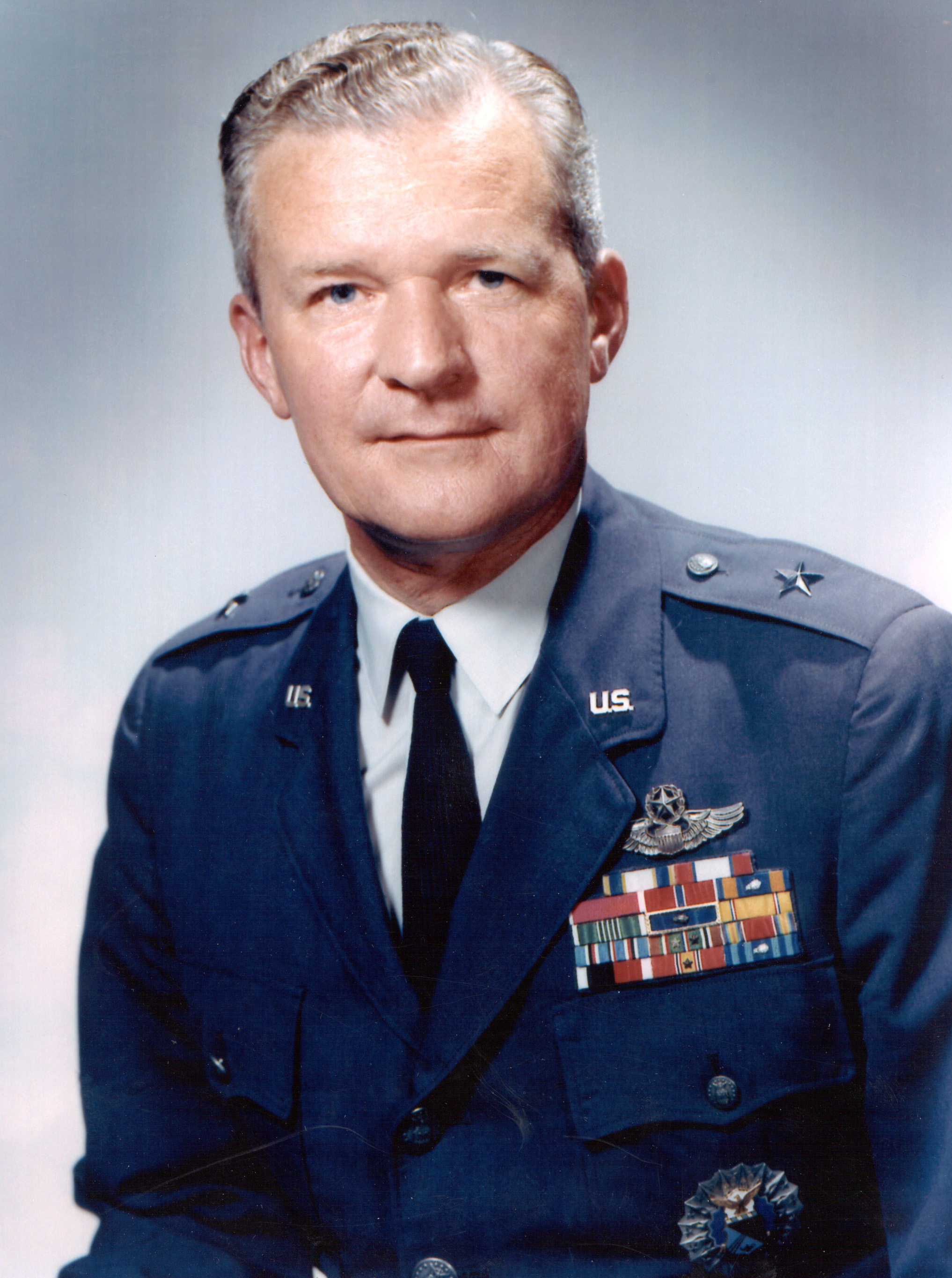
Robert McDermott

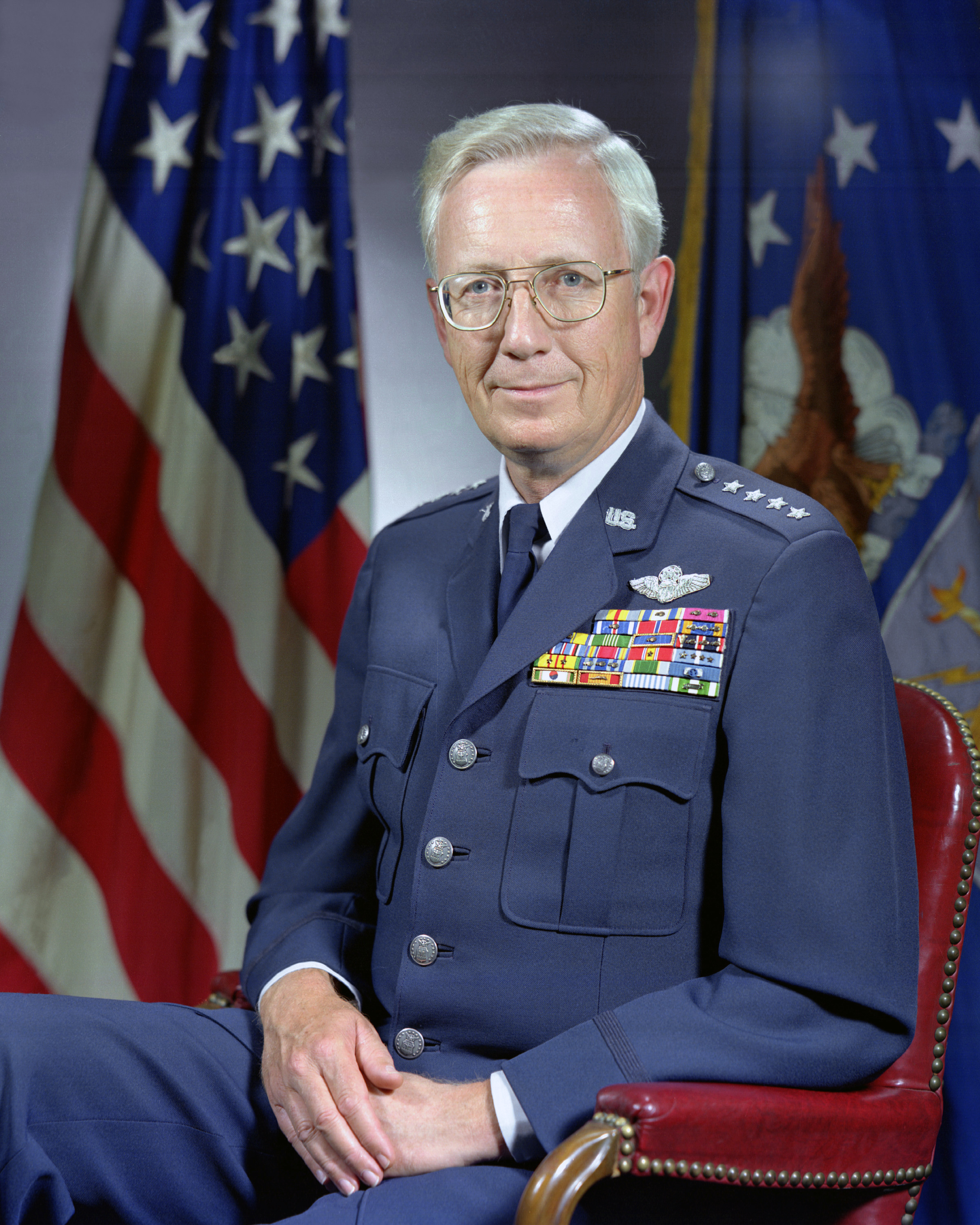
James Allen

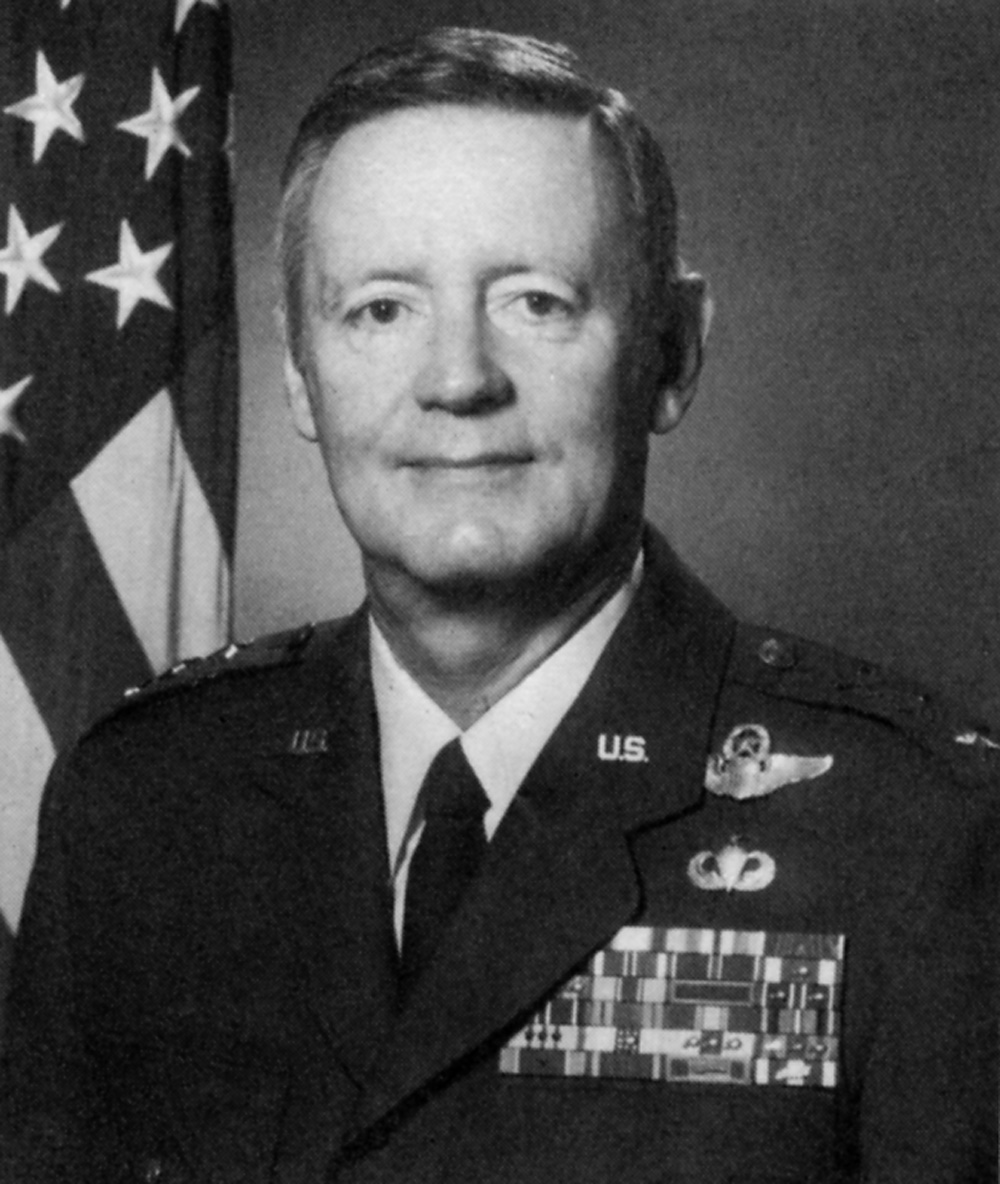
Charles Hamm

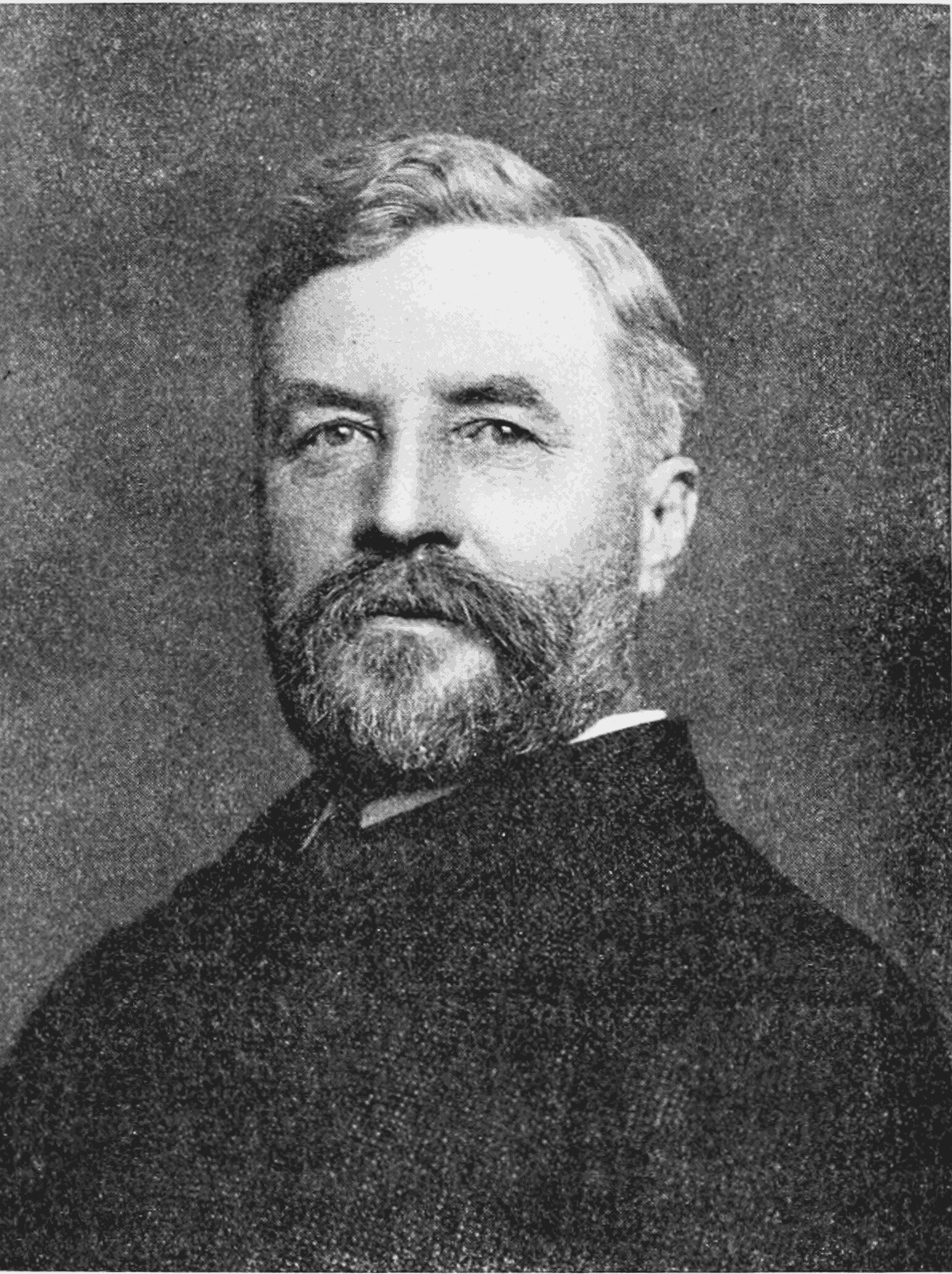
Winfield Scott Chaplin

=== Superintendents of the United States Military Academy ===
| # | Start | End | Name | Class year | Notability | References |
|---|---|---|---|---|---|---|
| 3 | 1812 | 1814 | Joseph Gardner Swift | 1802 | Brigadier general; first graduate of the Academy; Chief of Engineers | |
| 4 | 1814 | 1817 | Alden Partridge | 1806 | Captain; served as Acting Superintendent and Professor of Engineering; his administration was regarded as unsatisfactory and negligent to duties; when Sylvanus Thayer was appointed, Partridge refused to relinquish command and was court-martialed; he was sentenced to be cashiered in November 1817, and resigned from the Army in April 1818 | |
| 5 | 1817 | 1833 | Sylvanus Thayer | 1808 | Brigadier general; "Father of West Point"; emphasized engineering; founded engineering schools; helped found the Academy's Association of Graduates; Sylvanus Thayer Award created by the Academy in his honor | |
| 6 | 1833 | 1838 | René Edward De Russy | 1812 | Brigadier general; military engineer; Union Army veteran | |
| 7 | 1838 | 1845 | Richard Delafield | 1818 | Major general; Chief of Engineers; American Civil War veteran; served as 7th, 11th, and 13th Superintendents | |
| 8 | 1845 | 1852 | Henry Brewerton | 1819 | Brigadier general; military engineer; Union Army veteran | |
| 9 | 1852 | 1855 | Robert E. Lee | 1829 | Colonel USA; graduated second in his class at the Academy, without demerits; son George Washington Custis Lee, class of 1854, graduated first in class; served in Confederate States Army ( 1861–1865); President, Washington and Lee University (1865–70) | |
| 10 | 1855 | 1856 | John Gross Barnard | 1833 | Major general; military engineer; Union Army veteran | |
| 11 | 1856 | 1861 | Richard Delafield | 1818 | Major general; Chief of Engineers; Union Army veteran; served as 7th, 11th, and 13th Superintendents | |
| 12 | 1861 | 1861 | Pierre Gustave Toutant (P.G.T.) Beauregard | 1838 | General CSA; military engineer; ordered the firing of shots at Fort Sumter, South Carolina that started the Civil War | |
| 13 | 1861 | 1861 | Richard Delafield | 1818 | Major general; Chief of Engineers; Union Army veteran; served as 7th, 11th, and 13th Superintendents | |
| 14 | 1861 | 1864 | Alexander Hamilton Bowman | 1825 | Lieutenant Colonel; military engineer; son Charles Stuart Bowman graduated from the Academy, class of 1860 | |
| 15 | 1864 | 1864 | Zealous Bates Tower | 1841 | Major general; military engineer; Union Army veteran | |
| 16 | 1864 | 1866 | George Washington Cullum | 1833 | Brigadier general; military engineer; wrote Biographical Register of the Officers and Graduates of the U.S. Military Academy at West Point, N.Y. in 1891 and developed the Cullum number system | |
| 17 | 1866 | 1871 | Thomas Gamble Pitcher | 1845 | Brigadier general; veteran of Battle of Harper's Ferry, Mexican–American War, and the Civil War | |
| 18 | 1871 | 1876 | Thomas H. Ruger | 1854 | Major general; military engineer and lawyer; veteran of Civil War; military engineer and lawyer; military Governor of Georgia (1868) | |
| 19 | 1876 | 1881 | John McAllister Schofield | 1853 | Lieutenant general; recipient of the Medal of Honor for his actions leading an attack at the Battle of Wilson's Creek; Superintendent of the Academy (1876–81); Commanding General of the United States Army (1888–95) | |
| 20 | 1881 | 1882 | Oliver Otis Howard | 1854 | Major general; recipient of the Medal of Honor for his actions leading an attack at the Battle of Seven Pines despite wound which resulted in the loss of his right arm; led the campaign against Chief Joseph and the Nez Perce tribe; founder of Howard University | |
| 21 | 1882 | 1887 | Wesley Merritt | 1860 | Major general; veteran of the Civil War and Spanish–American War; first Military Governor of the Philippines | |
| 22 | 1887 | 1889 | John Parke | 1849 | Major general; military engineer; Union Army veteran | |
| 23 | 1889 | 1893 | John Moulder Wilson | 1860 | Brigadier general; recipient of the Medal of Honor for his actions at the Battle of Malvern Hill though acutely ill; Chief of Engineers (1897–1901) | |
| 24 | 1893 | 1898 | Oswald Herbert Ernst | 1864 | Major general; military engineer; Union Army and Spanish–American War veteran | |
| 25 | 1898 | 1906 | Albert Leopold Mills | 1879 | Major general; recipient of the Medal of Honor for continuing to lead his men at the Battle of San Juan Hill despite being shot in the head and temporarily blinded; appointed Superintendent to West Point by President McKinley, which carried automatic promotion from First Lieutenant to Colonel | |
| 26 | 1906 | 1910 | Hugh L. Scott | 1876 | Major general; learned to speak many western Native American languages; Chief of Staff of the Army (1914–17) | |
| 27 | 1910 | 1912 | Thomas Henry Barry | 1877 | Major general; cavalry and infantry officer; veteran of Indian Wars, China Relief Expedition, and Philippine–American War | |
| 28 | 1912 | 1916 | Clarence Page Townsley | 1881 | Major general; coastal artillery officer; commanded 30th Infantry Division during World War I | |
| 29 | 1916 | 1917 | John Biddle | 1881 | Major general; military engineer; World War I veteran | |
| 30 | 1917 | 1919 | Samuel Escue Tillman | 1869 | Brigadier general; recalled from retirement during World War I to serve as superintendent; refused to add military aviation to the curriculum; instructor at the Academy for more than 30 years; author of numerous books on chemistry and geology | |
| 31 | 1919 | 1922 | Douglas MacArthur | 1903 | General of the Army, Field Marshal in the Philippine Army; United States occupation of Veracruz; Second Battle of the Marne, Battle of Saint-Mihiel, Meuse-Argonne Offensive during World War I; commander of the 42nd Infantry Division; established Honor Code, and intramural sports at the U.S. Military Academy; brigade commander in the Philippine Division; commander of the Philippine Department; Chief of Staff of the United States Army (1930–35); recipient of the Medal of Honor for actions during the Battle of Bataan, commander of the South West Pacific Area during World War II; Supreme Commander of the Allied Powers during the Occupation of Japan; Korean War; grandson of Wisconsin Governor Arthur MacArthur Sr.; son of Lieutenant General and Medal of Honor recipient Arthur MacArthur Jr. | |
| 32 | 1922 | 1925 | Fred Winchester Sladen | 1890 | Major general; Superintendent of Fort McHenry National Monument (1931–32) | |
| 33 | 1926 | 1927 | Merch Bradt Stewart | 1896 | Brigadier general; infantry officer; Spanish–American War veteran; commander 175th Infantry Brigade during World War I | |
| 34 | 1927 | 1928 | Edwin Baruch Winans | 1891 | Major general; instructor at military schools; commended for leadership of the 10th Cavalry Regiment | |
| 35 | 1929 | 1932 | William Ruthven Smith | 1892 | Major general; artillery and infantry officer; commanded 36th Infantry Division during World War I | |
| 36 | 1932 | 1938 | William Durward Connor | 1897 | Major general; awarded two Silver Stars; Commandant of Army War College | |
| 37 | 1938 | 1940 | Jay Leland Benedict | 1904 | Major general; artillery and staff officer; Army General Staff during World War II | |
| 38 | 1940 | 1942 | Robert L. Eichelberger | 1909 | General; American Expeditionary Force Siberia; commanded Eighth United States Army in World War II | |
| 39 | 1942 | 1945 | Francis Bowditch Wilby | 1905 | Major general; Chief of Staff of First United States Army (1939–41) | |
| 40 | 1945 | 1949 | Maxwell Davenport Taylor | 1922 | General; developed the phrasing of the Cadet Honor Code at the Academy; commander of 101st Airborne Division (1944–45); Chief of Staff of the Army (1955–59); Chairman of the Joint Chiefs of Staff (1962–64); United States Ambassador to South Vietnam (1964–65) | |
| 41 | 1949 | 1951 | Bryant Edward Moore | August 1917 | General; commanded 8th Infantry Division killed in a helicopter crash on 24 February 1951 while commanding the IX Corps during the Korean War | |
| 42 | 1951 | 1954 | Frederick Augustus Irving | April 1917 | Major general; commander 24th Infantry Division during World War II | |
| 43 | 1954 | 1956 | Blackshear M. Bryan | 1922 | Lieutenant general; commanded Prisoner of War Division for all the United States during World War II; commanded First United States Army (1957–60); his son, Blackshear M. Bryan Jr., class of 1954, was killed in Vietnam | |
| 44 | 1956 | 1960 | Garrison H. Davidson | 1927 | Lieutenant general; Academy football coach (1933–37); combat engineer during World War II and the Korean War; helped construct The Pentagon | |
| 45 | 1960 | 1963 | William Westmoreland | 1936 | General; Distinguished Eagle Scout; given the Pershing Sword for the most able cadet upon graduation from the Academy; commander 101st Airborne Division; commander Military Assistance Command, Vietnam (1964–68); Chief of Staff of the Army (1968–72) | |
| 46 | 1963 | 1966 | James Benjamin Lampert | 1936 | Lieutenant general; combat engineer during World War II; early pioneer of nuclear weapons and nuclear power, served as General Leslie Groves' executive officer as part of the Manhattan Project after World War II; his father, James G. B. Lampert, class of 1910 was killed in World War I | |
| 47 | 1966 | 1969 | Donald V. Bennett | 1940 | General; Director of the Defense Intelligence Agency (1969–72); commander United States Army Pacific (1972–74) | |
| 48 | 1969 | 1970 | Samuel William Koster | 1942 | Major general but demoted to brigadier general and denied a promotion to lieutenant general for covering up the My Lai Massacre | |
| 49 | 1970 | 1974 | William Allen Knowlton | January 1943 | General; World War II and Vietnam War veteran; his daughter married General David Petraeus who was a cadet while Knowlton was Superintendent; Chief of Staff for United States European Command (1974–76) | |
| 50 | 1974 | 1977 | Sidney Bryan Berry | 1948 | Lieutenant general; Korean and Vietnam War veteran, wounded twice in Vietnam; Superintendent during the time women were first admitted to the Academy; Commissioner of Public Safety for the state of Mississippi (1980–84) | |
| 51 | 1977 | 1981 | Andrew Jackson Goodpaster | 1939 | General; 8th Infantry Division (1961–62); Supreme Allied Commander, Europe (1969–74); Commander in Chief of the United States European Command (CINCEUR) (1969–74); retired then became Superintendent, then retired a second time | |
| 52 | 1981 | 1986 | Willard Warren Scott Jr. | 1948 | Lieutenant general; commander 25th Infantry Division (1976–78); commander V Corps (1980–81) | |
| 53 | 1986 | 1991 | Dave Richard Palmer | 1956 | Lieutenant general; military historian; instructor at the Academy and the Vietnamese National Military Academy | |
| 54 | 1991 | 1996 | Howard D. Graves | 1961 | Lieutenant general; Rhodes Scholar; military engineer; Chancellor of the Texas A&M University System (1999–2003) | |
| 55 | 1996 | 2001 | Daniel William Christman | 1965 | Lieutenant general; graduated first in his class in 1965; Senior Vice President for International Affairs, U.S. Chamber of Commerce; four-time recipient of the Defense Distinguished Service Medal. | |
| 56 | 2001 | 2006 | William James Lennox Jr. | 1971 | Lieutenant general; artillery and staff officer; Deputy Commanding General Eighth United States Army; doctorate in literature from Princeton University | |
| 57 | 2006 | 2010 | Franklin Lee Hagenbeck | 1971 | Lieutenant general; commander 10th Mountain Division (2001–03) | |
| 58 | 2010 | 2013 | David H. Huntoon | 1973 | Lieutenant general; Director of the Army Staff; Former Commandant of the U.S. Army War College | |
| 59 | 2013 | 2018 | Robert L. Caslen | 1975 | Lieutenant general; chief of staff for Combined Joint Task Force-180 (CJTF-180) in Afghanistan from May through September 2002; Chief of the Office of Security Cooperation for Iraq | |
| 60 | 2018 | 2022 | Darryl A. Williams | 1983 | General; Managed U.S. response to the West African Ebola virus epidemic in 2016; Commander of NATO Allied Land Command (2016–2018); First black superintendent in the academy's history | |
| 61 | 2022 | | Steven W. Gilland | 1990 | Lieutenant general; Academy's commandant of cadets (2017–2019), Commander of the 2nd Infantry Division (2019–2021) | |

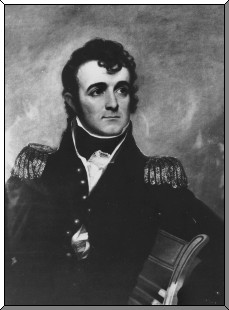
Joseph Swift (1812–14)

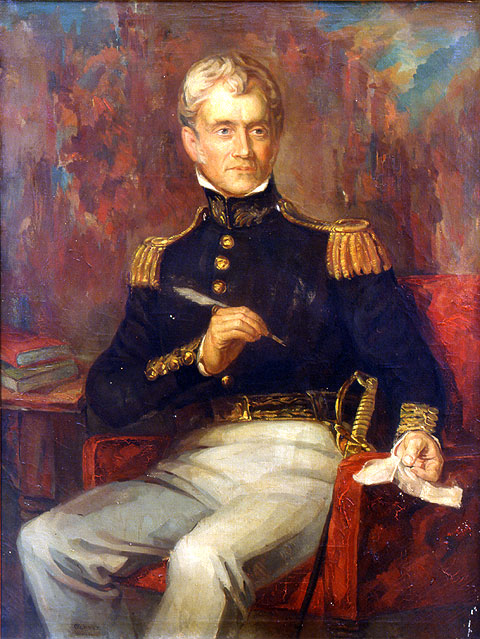
Sylvanus Thayer (1817–1833)

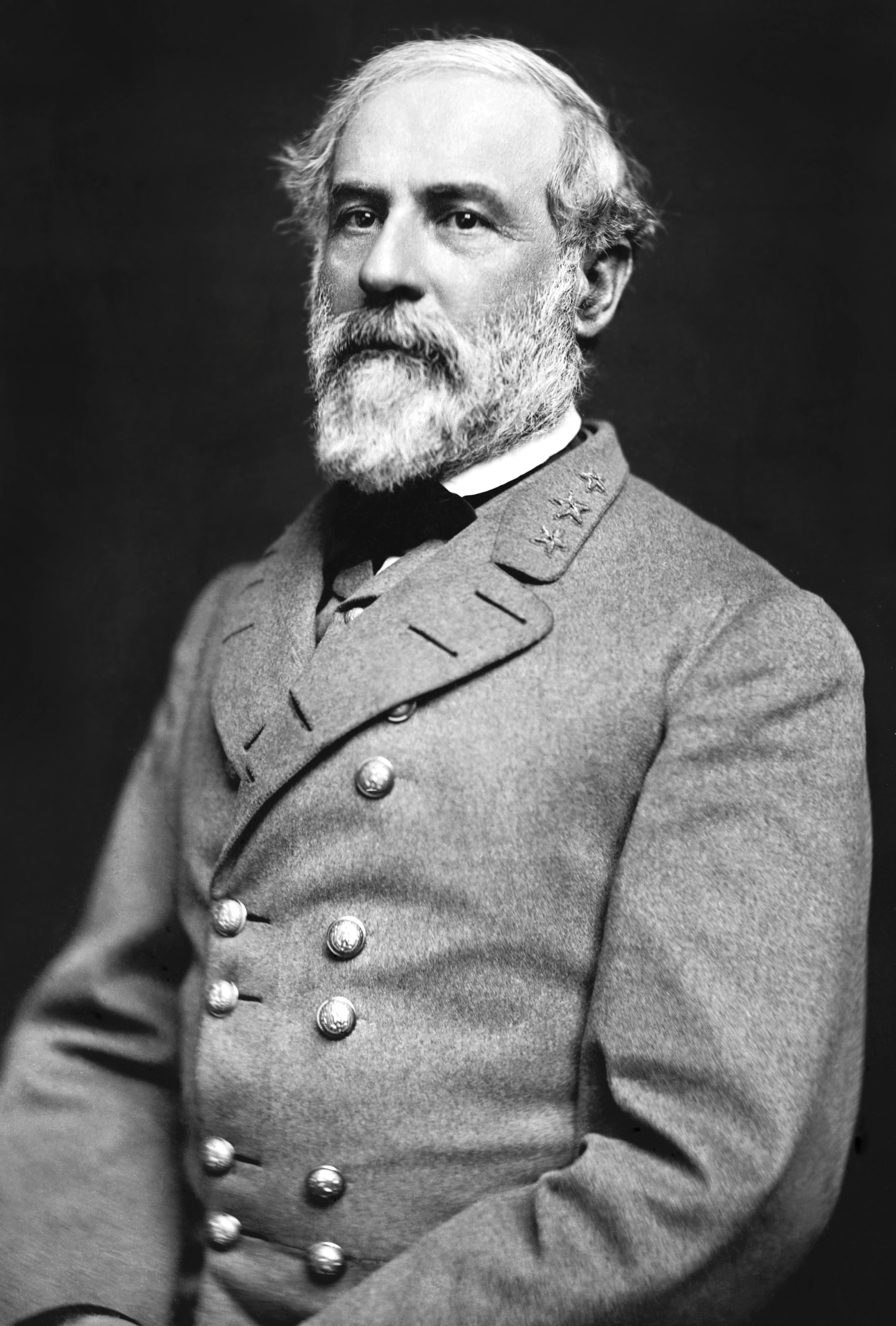
Robert E. Lee (1852–55)

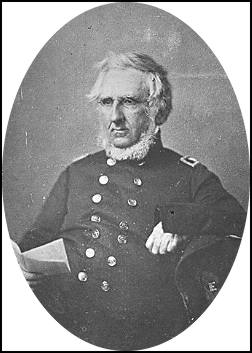
Richard Delafield (1856–61)

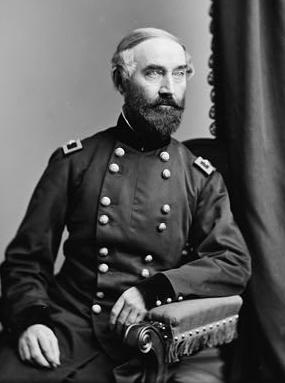
George Cullum (1864–66)

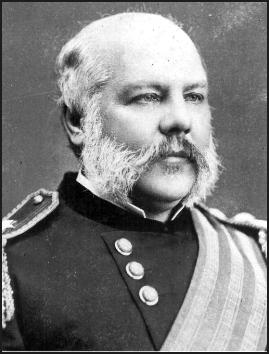
John Schofield (1876–81)

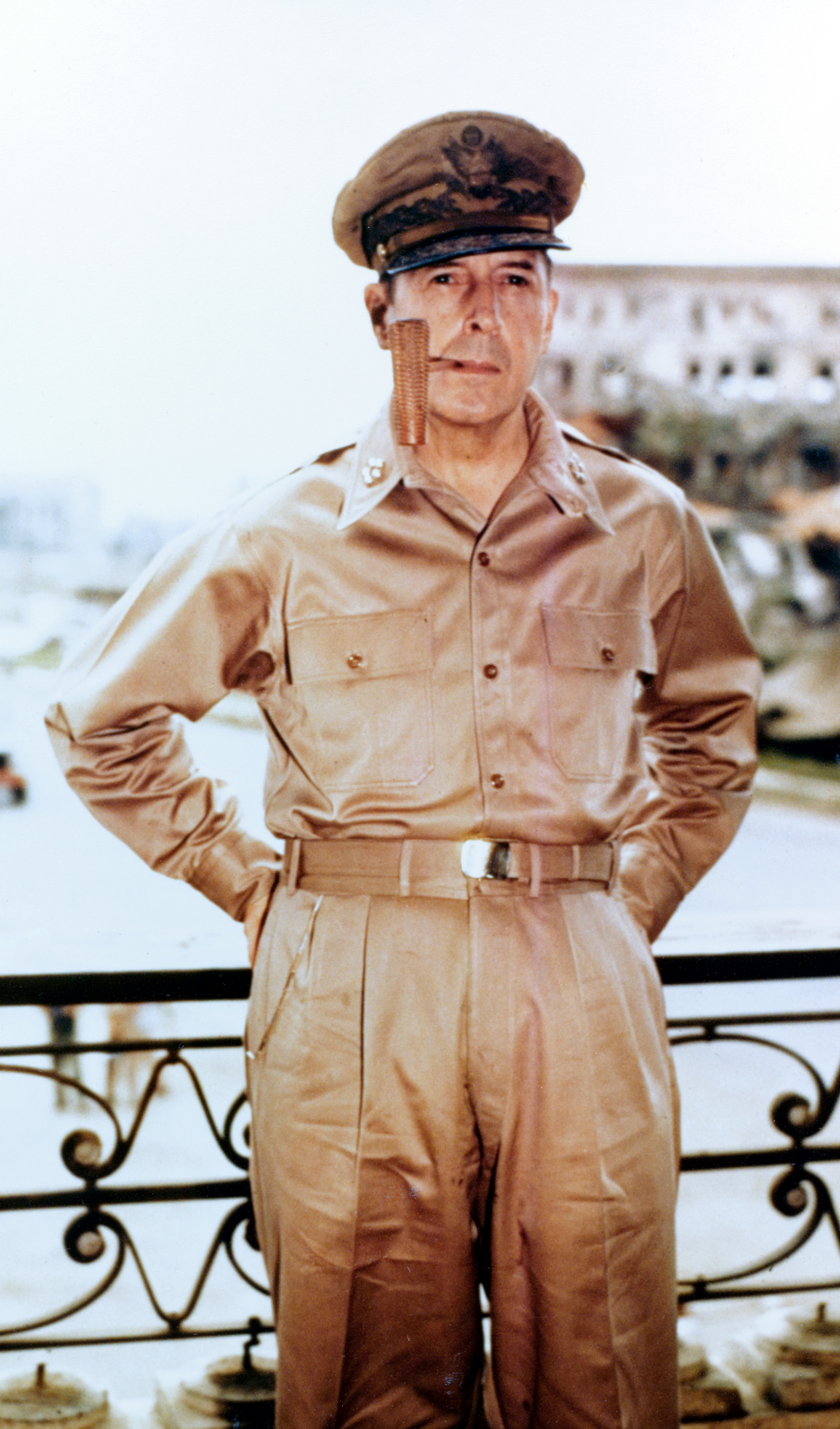
Douglas MacArthur (1919–22)

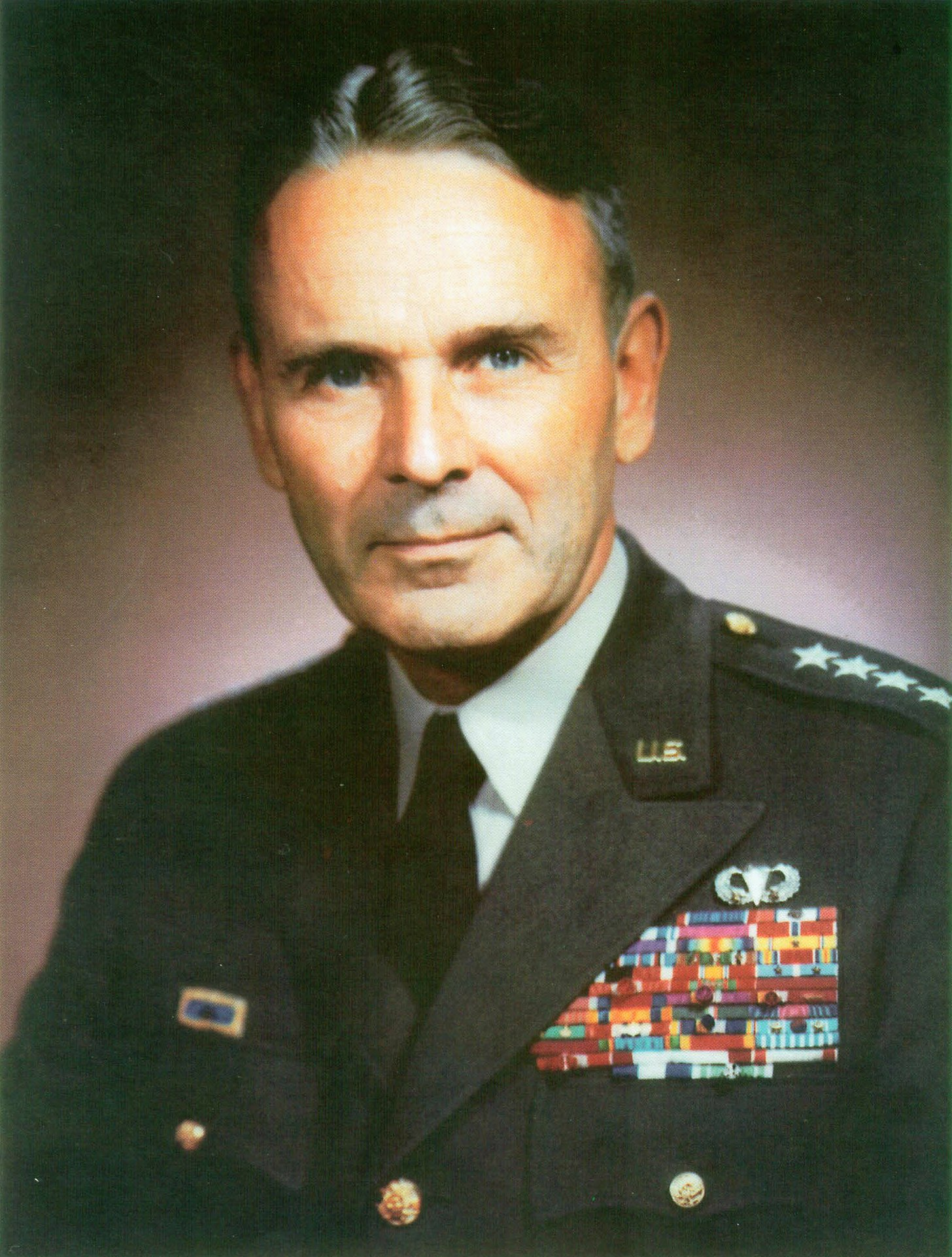
Maxwell Taylor (1945–49)

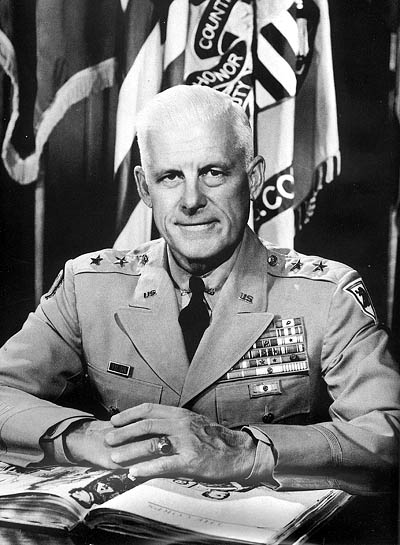
Garrison Davidson (1956–60)

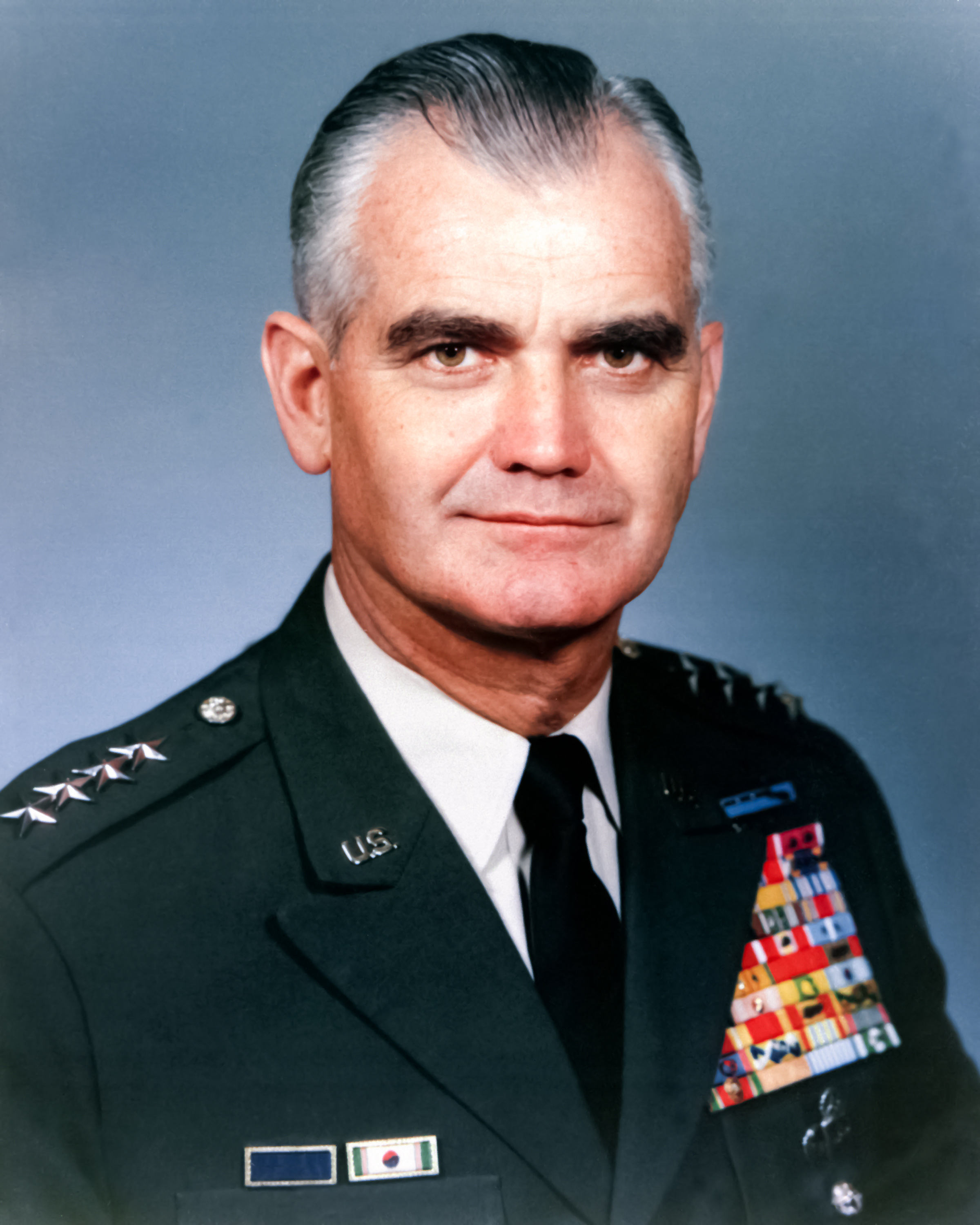
William Westmoreland (1960–63)

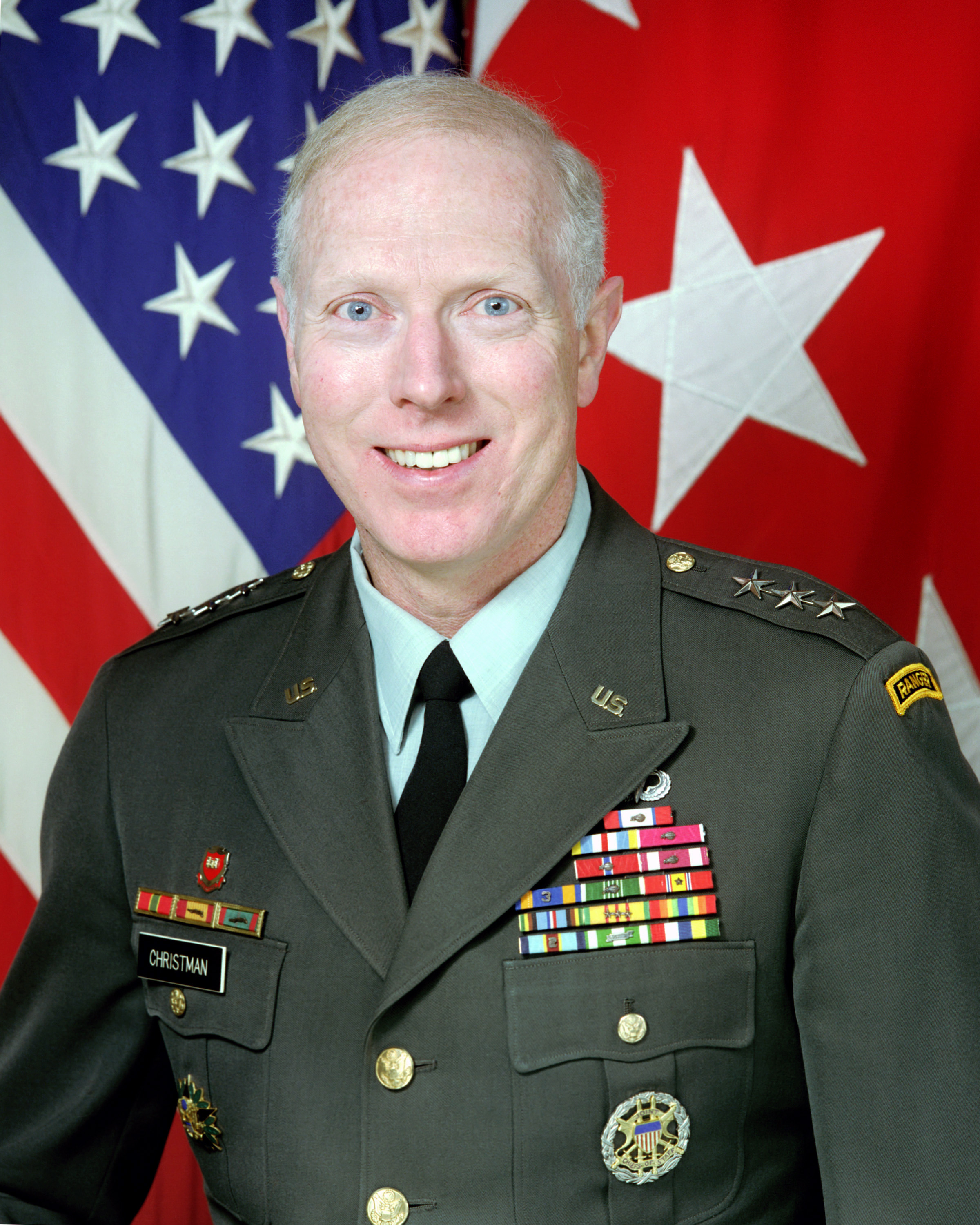
Daniel Christman (1996–2001)

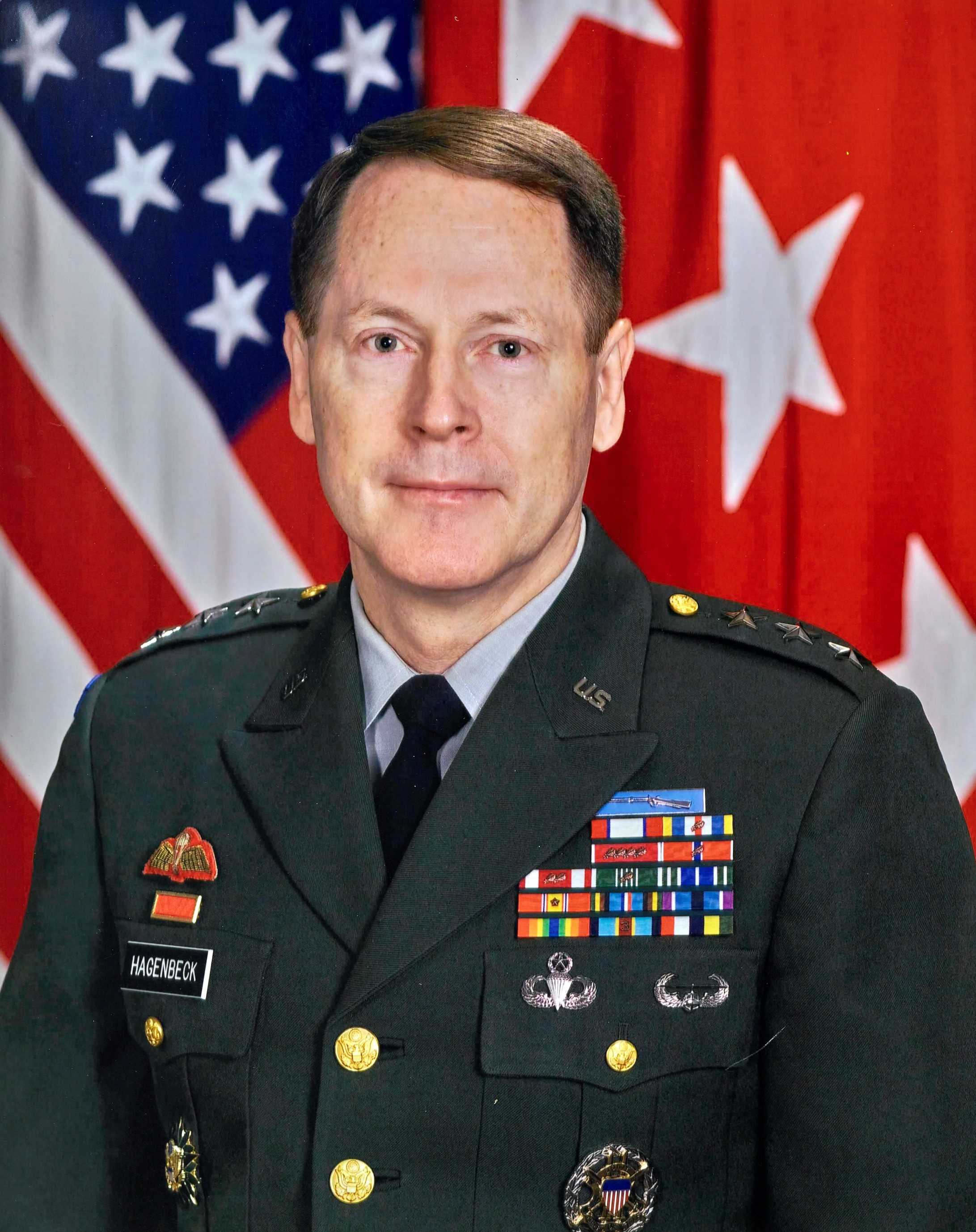
Franklin Hagenbeck (2006–10)

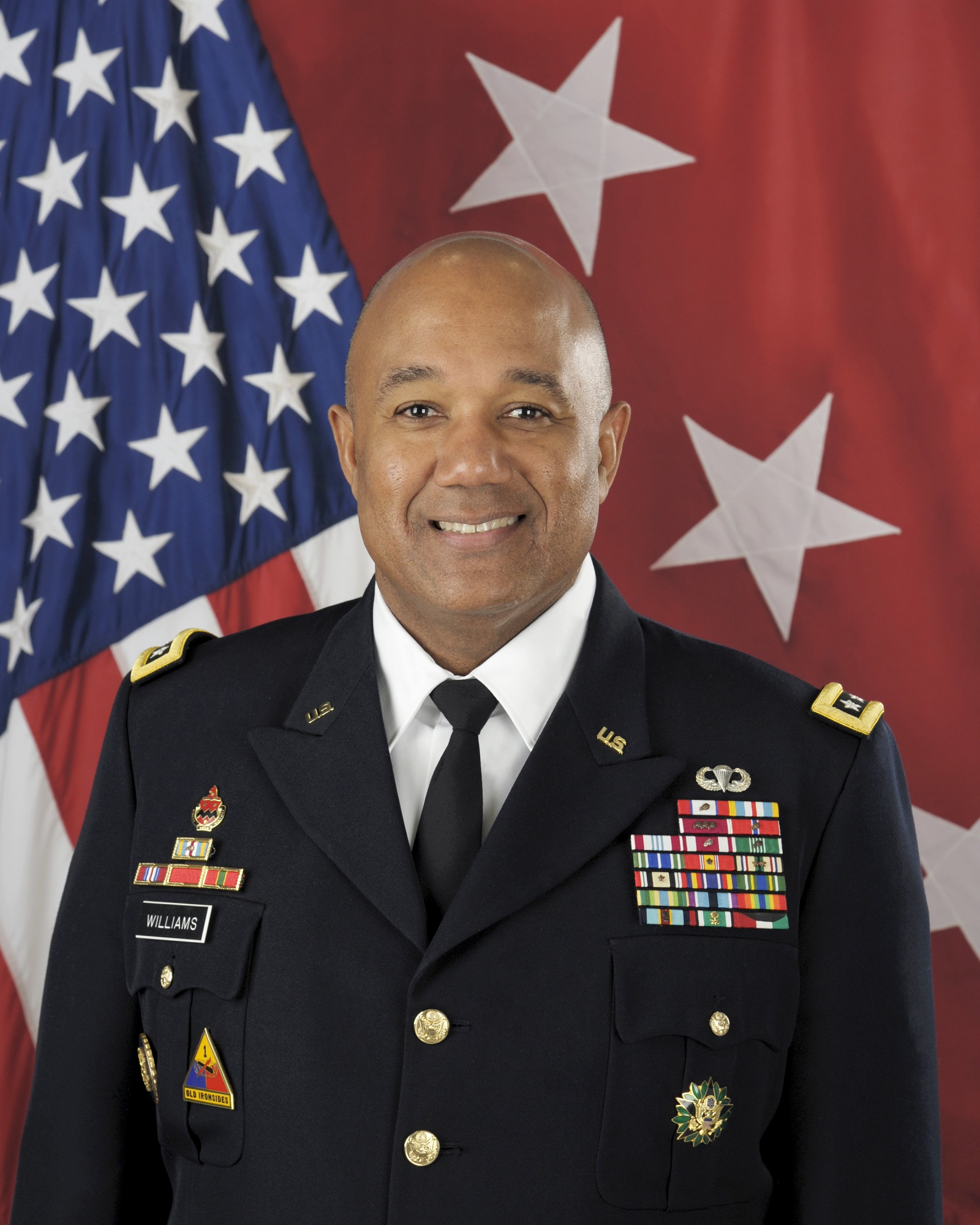
Darryl Williams (2018–2022)

=== Commandants of the United States Military Academy ===
| # | Start | End | Name | Class year | Notability | References |
|---|---|---|---|---|---|---|
| 1 | 1817 | 1818 | George W. Gardiner | 1814 | Killed in Dade's Massacre (second in command of the force under Major Dade) | |
| 3 | 1819 | 1820 | John R. Bell | 1812 | | |
| 5 | 1829 | 1833 | Ethan Allen Hitchcock | 1817 | Union Major General | |
| 7 | 1838 | 1842 | Charles Ferguson Smith | 1825 | Union Major General | |
| 8 | 1842 | 1845 | John Addison Thomas | 1833 | | |
| 9 | 1845 | 1852 | Bradford Ripley Alden | 1831 | | |
| 10 | 1852 | 1854 | Robert S. Garnett | 1841 | Confederate Brigadier General; killed in the Battle of Corrick's Ford | |
| 11 | 1854 | 1856 | William H.T. Walker | 1837 | Confederate Major General; killed in the Battle of Atlanta | |
| 12 | 1856 | 1860 | William J. Hardee | 1838 | Confederate Lieutenant General | |
| 13 | 1860 | 1861 | John F. Reynolds | 1841 | Union Major General; killed in the Battle of Gettysburg | |
| 14 | 1861 | 1861 | Christopher C. Augur | 1843 | Union Major General | |
| 15 | 1861 | 1862 | Kenner Garrard | 1851 | Union Brigadier General | |
| 16 | 1862 | 1864 | Henry B. Clitz | 1845 | | |
| 17 | 1864 | 1864 | John C. Tidball | 1848 | | |
| 18 | 1864 | 1870 | Henry M. Black | 1847 | | |
| 19 | 1870 | 1875 | Emory Upton | 1861 | Union Brigadier General | |
| 20 | 1875 | 1879 | Thomas H. Neill | 1847 | Union Brigadier General | |
| 21 | 1879 | 1882 | Henry M. Lazelle | 1855 | | |
| 22 | 1882 | 1888 | Henry C. Hasbrouck | 1861 | | |
| 23 | 1888 | 1892 | Hamilton S. Hawkins | — | Member of the class of 1856; did not graduate | |
| 24 | 1892 | 1897 | Samuel M. Mills | 1865 | | |
| 25 | 1897 | 1901 | Otto L. Hein | 1870 | | |
| 26 | 1901 | 1905 | Charles G. Treat | 1882 | | |
| 27 | 1905 | 1909 | Robert L. Howze | 1888 | Medal of Honor recipient | |
| 28 | 1909 | 1911 | Frederick W. Sibley | 1874 | | |
| 29 | 1911 | 1914 | Fred Winchester Sladen | 1890 | Superintendent of the United States Military Academy (1922-1926) | |
| 30 | 1914 | 1916 | Morton F. Smith | 1895 | | |
| 31 | 1916 | 1918 | Guy Vernor Henry | 1898 | Olympic bronze medallist | |
| 32 | 1918 | 1919 | Jens Bugge | 1895 | | |
| 33 | 1919 | 1923 | Robert M. Danford | 1904 | | |
| 34 | 1923 | 1926 | Merch B. Stewart | 1896 | Superintendent of the United States Military Academy (1926-1928) | |
| 35 | 1926 | 1929 | Campbell B. Hodges | 1903 | | |
| 36 | 1929 | 1933 | Robert C. Richardson Jr. | 1904 | | |
| 37 | 1933 | 1936 | Simon Bolivar Buckner Jr. | 1908 | | |
| 38 | 1936 | 1937 | Dennis E. McCunniff | 1913 | | |
| 39 | 1937 | 1941 | Charles W. Ryder | 1915 | | |
| 40 | 1941 | 1942 | Frederick A. Irving | 1917 | Superintendent of the United States Military Academy (1951-1954) | |
| 41 | 1942 | 1943 | Philip E. Gallagher | 1918 | | |
| 42 | 1943 | 1946 | George B. Honnen | 1920 | | |
| 43 | 1946 | 1948 | Gerald J. Higgins | 1934 | | |
| 44 | 1948 | 1951 | Paul D. Harkins | 1929 | | |
| 45 | 1951 | 1952 | John K. Waters | 1931 | | |
| 46 | 1952 | 1954 | John H. Michaelis | 1936 | | |
| 47 | 1954 | 1956 | Edwin J. Messinger | 1931 | | |
| 48 | 1956 | 1959 | John L. Throckmorton | 1935 | | |
| 49 | 1959 | 1961 | Charles W. G. Rich | 1935 | | |
| 50 | 1961 | 1963 | Richard G. Stilwell | 1938 | | |
| 51 | 1963 | 1965 | Michael S. Davison | 1939 | | |
| 52 | 1965 | 1967 | Richard P. Scott | 1941 | | |
| 53 | 1967 | 1969 | Bernard W. Rogers | 1943 | | |
| 54 | 1969 | 1972 | Sam S. Walker | 1946 | | |
| 55 | 1972 | 1975 | Phillip R. Feir | 1949 | | |
| 56 | 1975 | 1977 | Walter F. Ulmer | 1952 | | |
| 57 | 1977 | 1979 | John C. Bard | 1954 | | |
| 58 | 1979 | 1982 | Joseph P. Franklin | 1955 | | |
| 59 | 1982 | 1984 | John H. Moellering | 1959 | | |
| 60 | 1984 | 1987 | Peter J. Boylan | 1961 | | |
| 61 | 1987 | 1989 | Fred A. Gorden | 1962 | | |
| 62 | 1989 | 1992 | David A. Bramlett | 1964 | | |
| 63 | 1992 | 1994 | Robert F. Foley | 1963 | Medal of Honor recipient | |
| 64 | 1994 | 1995 | Freddy E. McFarren | 1966 | | |
| 65 | 1995 | 1997 | Robert J. St. Onge Jr. | 1969 | | |
| 66 | 1997 | 1999 | John P. Abizaid | 1973 | | |
| 67 | 1999 | 2002 | Eric Olson | 1972 | | |
| 68 | 2002 | 2004 | Leo A. Brooks Jr. | 1979 | | |
| 69 | 2004 | 2006 | Curtis M. Scaparrotti | 1978 | | |
| 70 | 2006 | 2008 | Robert L. Caslen | 1975 | Superintendent of the United States Military Academy (2013-2018) | |
| 71 | 2008 | 2009 | Michael S. Linnington | 1980 | | |
| 72 | 2009 | 2011 | William E. Rapp | 1984 | | |
| 73 | 2011 | 2012 | Theodore D. Martin | 1983 | | |
| 74 | 2012 | 2014 | Richard Clarke | 1984 | | |
| 75 | 2014 | 2016 | John Thomson | 1986 | | |
| 76 | 2016 | 2017 | Diana Holland | 1990 | | |
| 77 | 2017 | 2019 | Steven Gilland | 1990 | Superintendent of the United States Military Academy (2022-present) | |
| 78 | 2019 | 2021 | Curtis Buzzard | 1992 | | |
| 79 | 2021 | 2023 | Mark Quander | 1995 | | |
| 80 | 2023 | 2024 | Lori Robinson | 1994 | | |
| 81 | 2024 | present | Rogelio Garcia | 1996 | | |

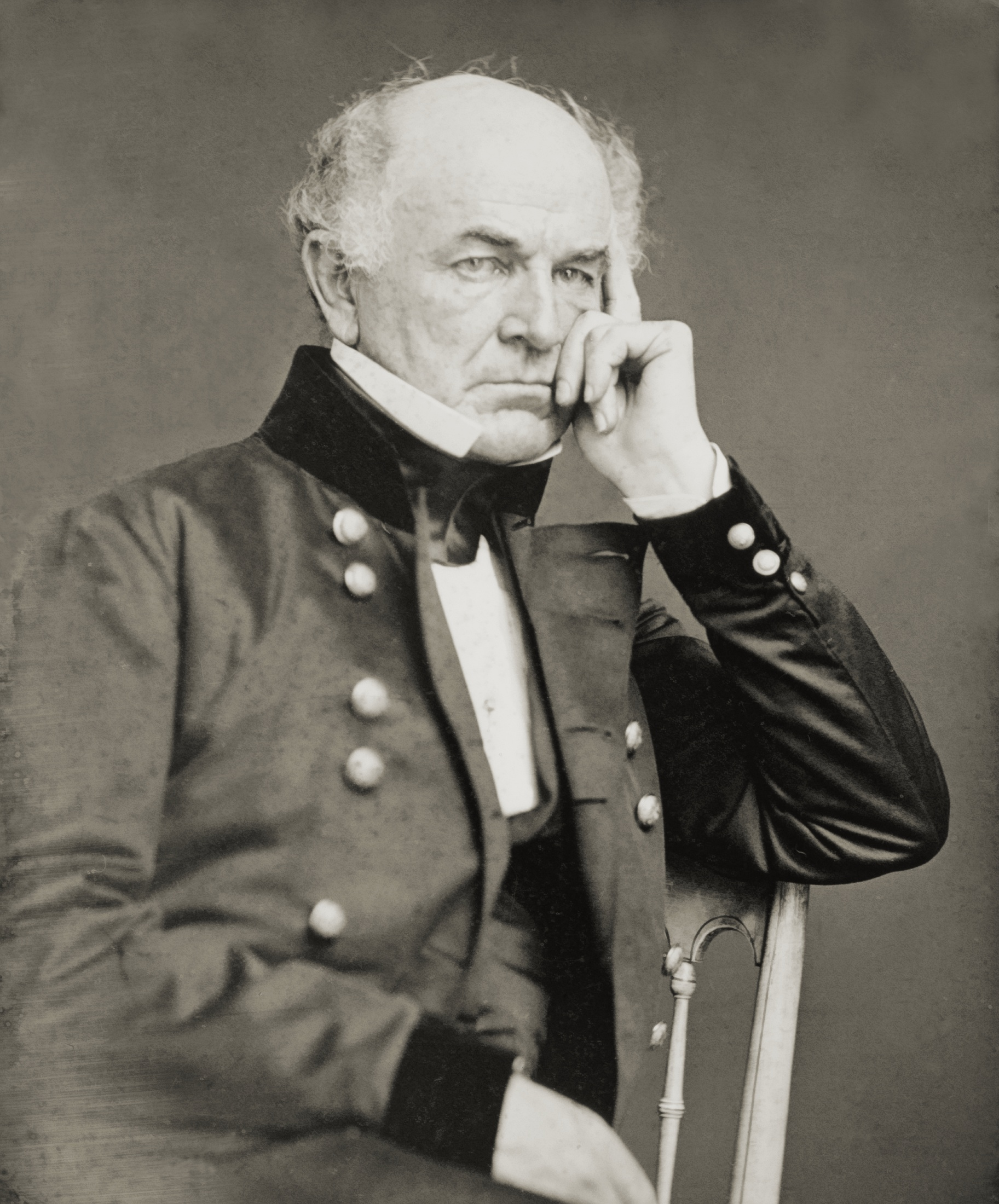
Ethan A. Hitchcock

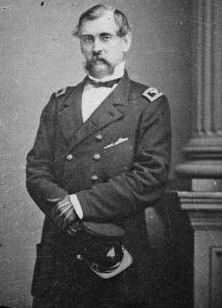
Charles Ferguson Smith

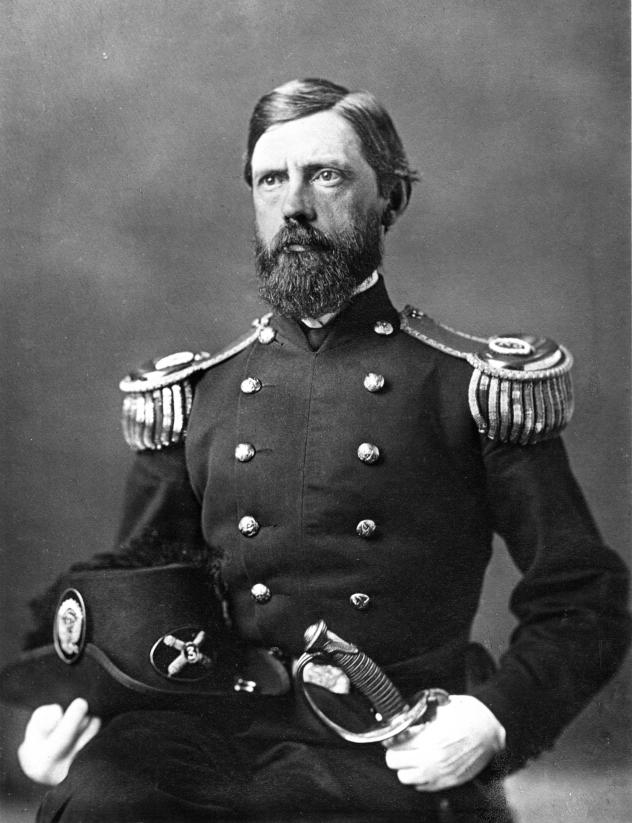
John F. Reynolds

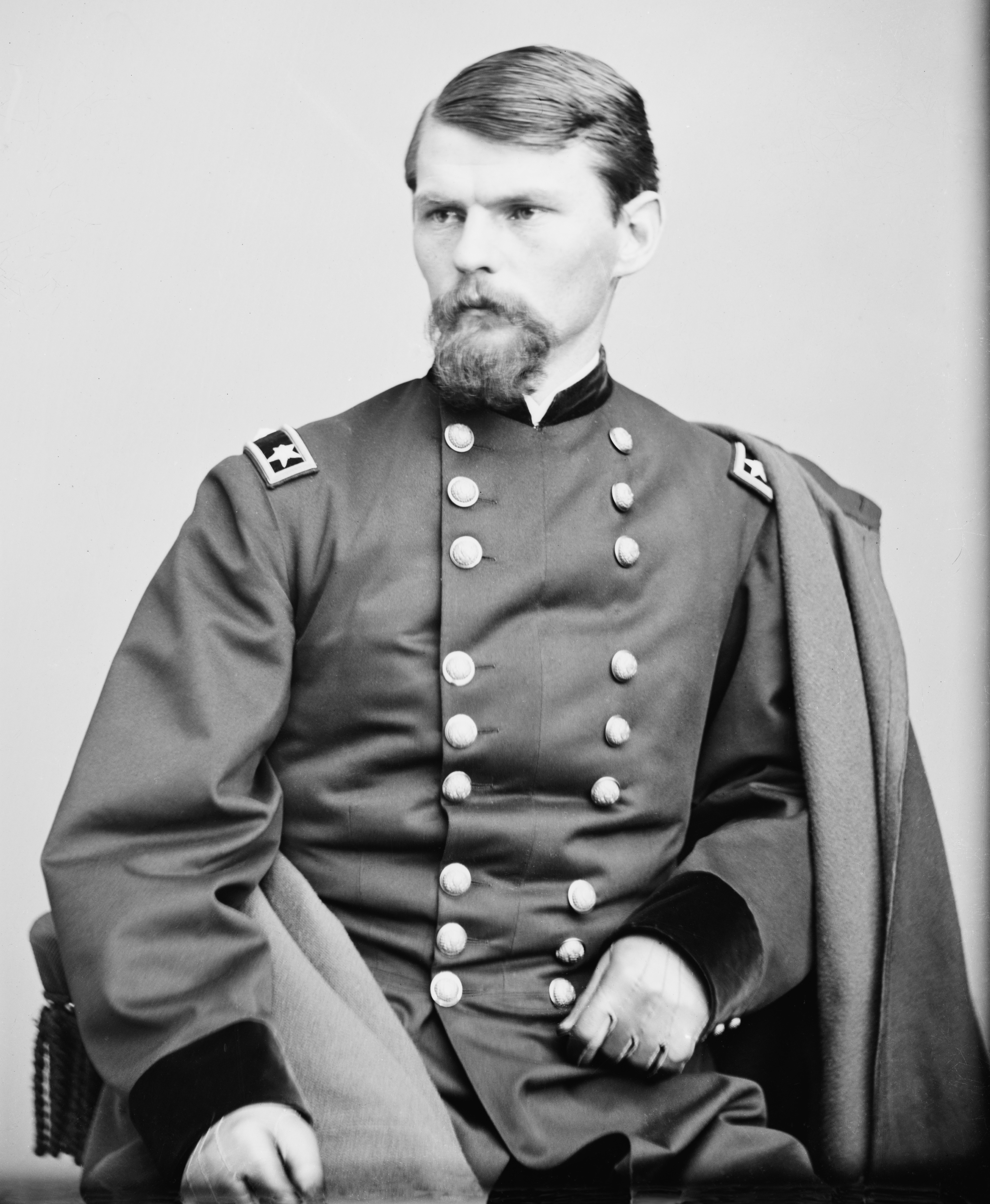
Emory Upton

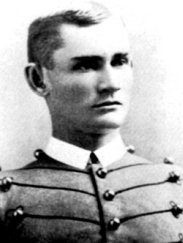
Robert L. Howze

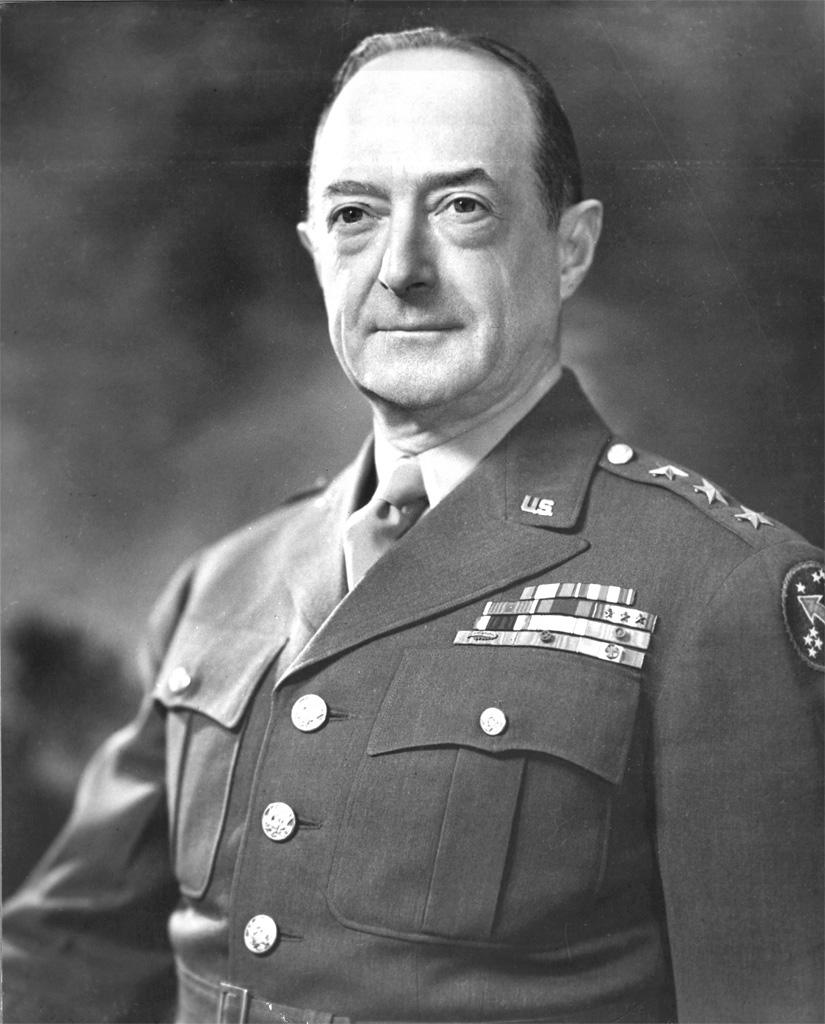
Robert C. Richardson

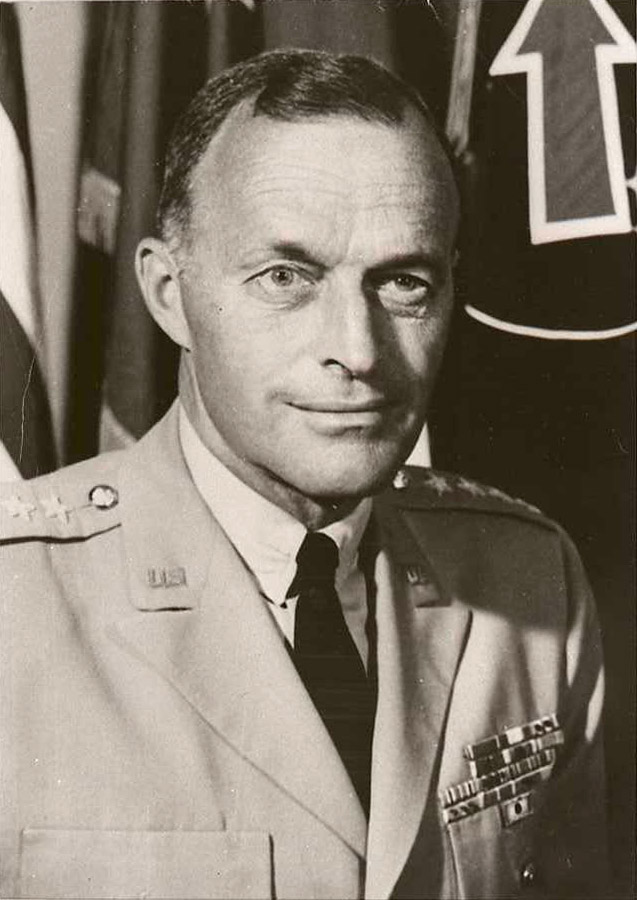
John K. Waters

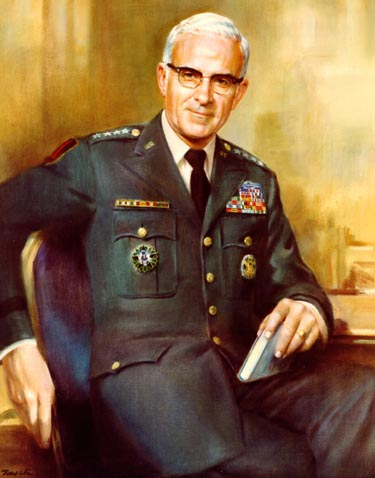
Bernard W. Rogers

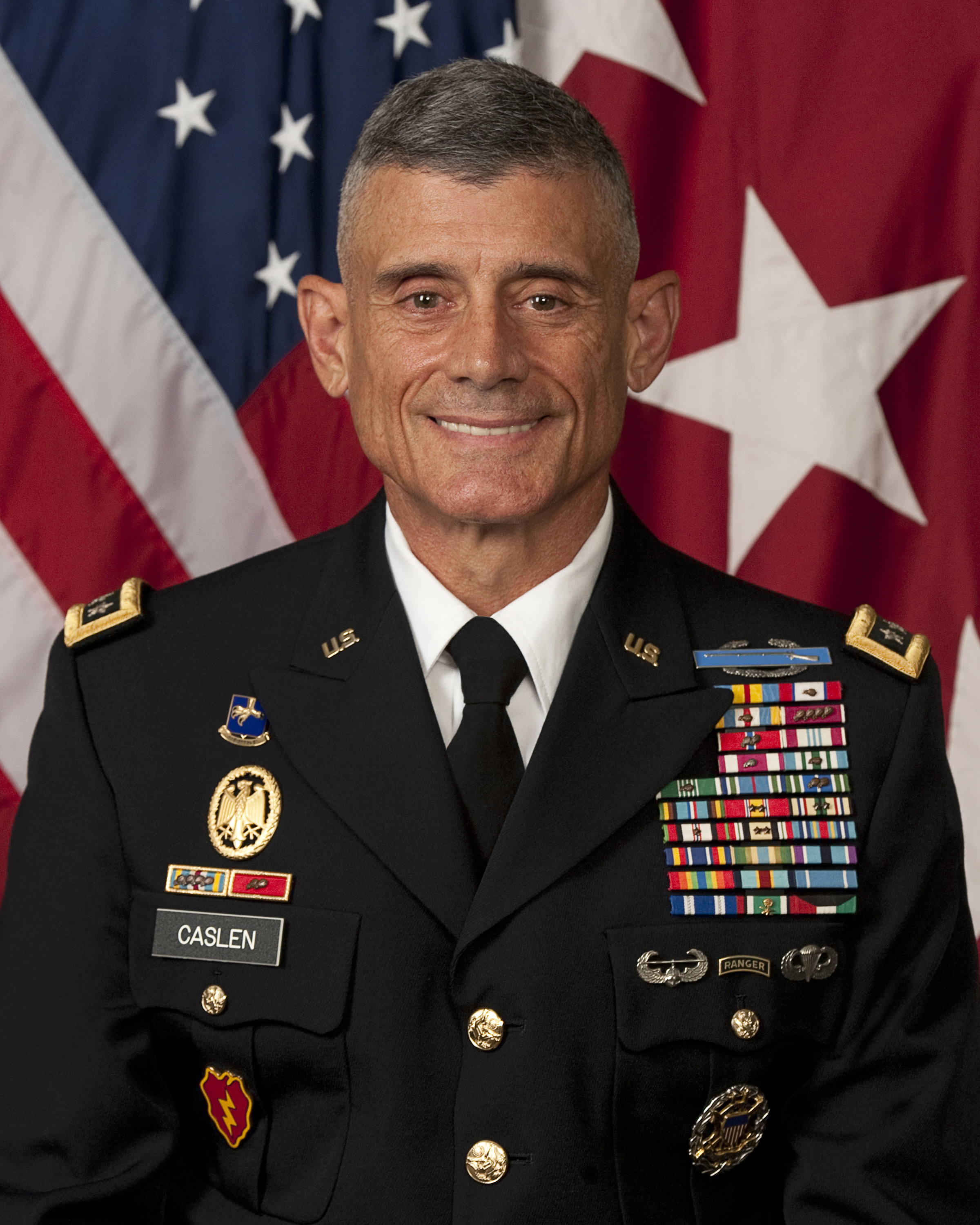
Robert Caslen

=== Superintendents of the United States Air Force Academy ===
| No. | Superintendent | | Term | | | Class Year | Notes and Reference |
| No. | Portrait | Name | Took office | Left office | Term length | Class Year | Notes and Reference |
|---|---|---|---|---|---|---|---|
| 1 | Hubert R. Harmon | Lieutenant General; Hubert R. Harmon (1892–1957) | 27 July 1954 | 28 July 1956 | 2 years, 1 day | USMA 1915 | |
| 2 | James E. Briggs | Major General; James E. Briggs (1906–1979) | 28 July 1956 | 17 August 1959 | 3 years, 20 days | USMA 1928 | |
| 3 | William S. Stone | Major General; William S. Stone (1910–1968) | 17 August 1959 | 9 July 1962 | 2 years, 326 days | USMA 1934 | |
| 4 | Robert H. Warren | Major General; Robert H. Warren (1917–2010) | 9 July 1962 | 1 July 1965 | 2 years, 357 days | USMA 1940 | |
| 5 | Thomas S. Moorman | Lieutenant General; Thomas S. Moorman (1910–1997) | 1 July 1965 | 1 August 1970 | 5 years, 31 days | USMA 1933 | |
| 6 | Albert P. Clark | Lieutenant General; Albert P. Clark (1913–2010) | 1 August 1970 | 1 August 1974 | 4 years, 0 days | USMA 1936 | |
| 7 | James R. Allen | Lieutenant General; James R. Allen (1925–1992) | 1 August 1974 | 28 June 1977 | 2 years, 331 days | USMA 1948 | |
| 8 | Kenneth L. Tallman | Lieutenant General; Kenneth L. Tallman (1925–2006) | 28 June 1977 | 16 June 1981 | 3 years, 353 days | USMA 1946 | |
| 10 | Winfield W. Scott Jr. | Lieutenant General; Winfield W. Scott Jr. (1927–2022) | 16 June 1983 | 26 June 1987 | 4 years, 10 days | USMA 1950 | |
| 11 | Charles R. Hamm | Lieutenant General; Charles R. Hamm (born 1933) | 26 June 1987 | 25 June 1991 | 3 years, 364 days | USMA 1956 | |

=== Commandant of Cadets of the United States Air Force Academy ===
| No. | Commandant of Cadets | | Term | | | Class Year | Notes and Reference |
| No. | Portrait | Name | Took office | Left office | Term length | Class Year | Notes and Reference |
|---|---|---|---|---|---|---|---|
| 1 | Robert M. Stillman | Major General; Robert M. Stillman | 1954 | 1958 | ~4 years | USMA 1935 | (Note: First Commandant of Cadets at the Academy) |
| 2 | Henry R. Sullivan Jr. | Major General; Henry R. Sullivan Jr. | 1958 | 1961 | ~3 years | USMA 1939 | |
| 3 | William Seawell | Major General; William Seawell | 1961 | 1963 | ~2 years | USMA 1941 | |
| 4 | Robert William Strong Jr. | Major General; Robert William Strong Jr. | 1963 | 1965 | ~2 years | USMA 1940 | |
| 5 | Louis T. Seith | Brigadier General; Louis T. Seith | 1965 | 1967 | ~2 years | USMA 1943 | |
| 6 | Robin Olds | Brigadier General; Robin Olds | 1967 | 1971 | ~4 years | USMA 1943 | |
| 7 | Walter T. Galligan | Brigadier General; Walter T. Galligan | 1971 | 1973 | ~2 years | USMA 1945 | |
| 8 | Hoyt S. Vandenberg Jr. | Brigadier General; Hoyt S. Vandenberg Jr. | 1973 | 1975 | ~2 years | USMA 1951 | |
| 9 | Stanley C. Beck | Brigadier General; Stanley C. Beck | 1975 | 1978 | ~3 years | USMA 1954 | |

== Astronauts ==
Note: "Class year" refers to the alumni's class year, which usually is the same year they graduated. However, in times of war, classes often graduate early.

| Name | Class year | Notability | References |
|---|---|---|---|
| Frank Borman | 1950 | Commanded Gemini 7 and Apollo 8; first to orbit Moon and to see far side of the Moon | |
| Buzz Aldrin | 1951 | Pilot of Gemini 12 and Lunar Module Pilot on Apollo 11; 2nd person to walk on the Moon | |
| Michael Collins | 1952 | Pilot of Gemini 10 and Command Module Pilot on Apollo 11 | |
| Ed White | 1952 | Pilot of Gemini 4, died in the Apollo 1 fire; first American to perform a spacewalk; buried at West Point | |
| David Scott | 1954 | Pilot of Gemini 8, Command Module Pilot of Apollo 9, and Commander of Apollo 15; walked on the Moon | |
| Donald H. Peterson | 1955 | Mission Specialist on STS-6 | |
| Alfred Worden | 1955 | Command Module Pilot of Apollo 15 | |
| Richard M. Mullane | 1967 | Mission Specialist on STS-41-D, STS-27, and STS-36 | |
| Sherwood C. Spring | 1967 | Mission Specialist on STS-61-B | |
| James C. Adamson | 1969 | Mission Specialist on STS-28 and STS-43 | |
| William S. McArthur | 1973 | Mission Specialist on STS-58, STS-74, and STS-92; commanded International Space Station Expedition 12 | |
| Michael R. Clifford | 1974 | Mission Specialist on STS-53, STS-59, and STS-76 | |
| Charles D. Gemar | 1979 | Mission Specialist on STS-38, STS-48, and STS-62 | |
| Patrick G. Forrester | 1979 | Mission Specialist on STS-105, STS-117, and STS-128 | |
| Jeffrey Williams | 1980 | Mission Specialist on STS-101; Flight Engineer of ISS Expeditions 13 and 21, Commander of Expedition 22 | |
| Douglas H. Wheelock | 1983 | Mission Specialist on STS-120; Flight Engineer of ISS Expedition 24 and Commander of Expedition 25 | |
| Timothy L. Kopra | 1985 | Flight Engineer of International Space Station Expeditions 19 and 20 | |
| Robert S. Kimbrough | 1989 | Mission Specialist on STS-126 | |
| Francisco Rubio | 1998 | Soyuz MS-22/Soyuz MS-23 (Expedition 67/68/69). Holds the American record for the longest spaceflight of 371 days. | |
| Andrew R. Morgan | 1998 | Soyuz MS-13/Soyuz MS-15 (Expedition 60/61/62) | |
| Anne McClain | 2002 | Soyuz MS-11 (Expedition 58/59) | |

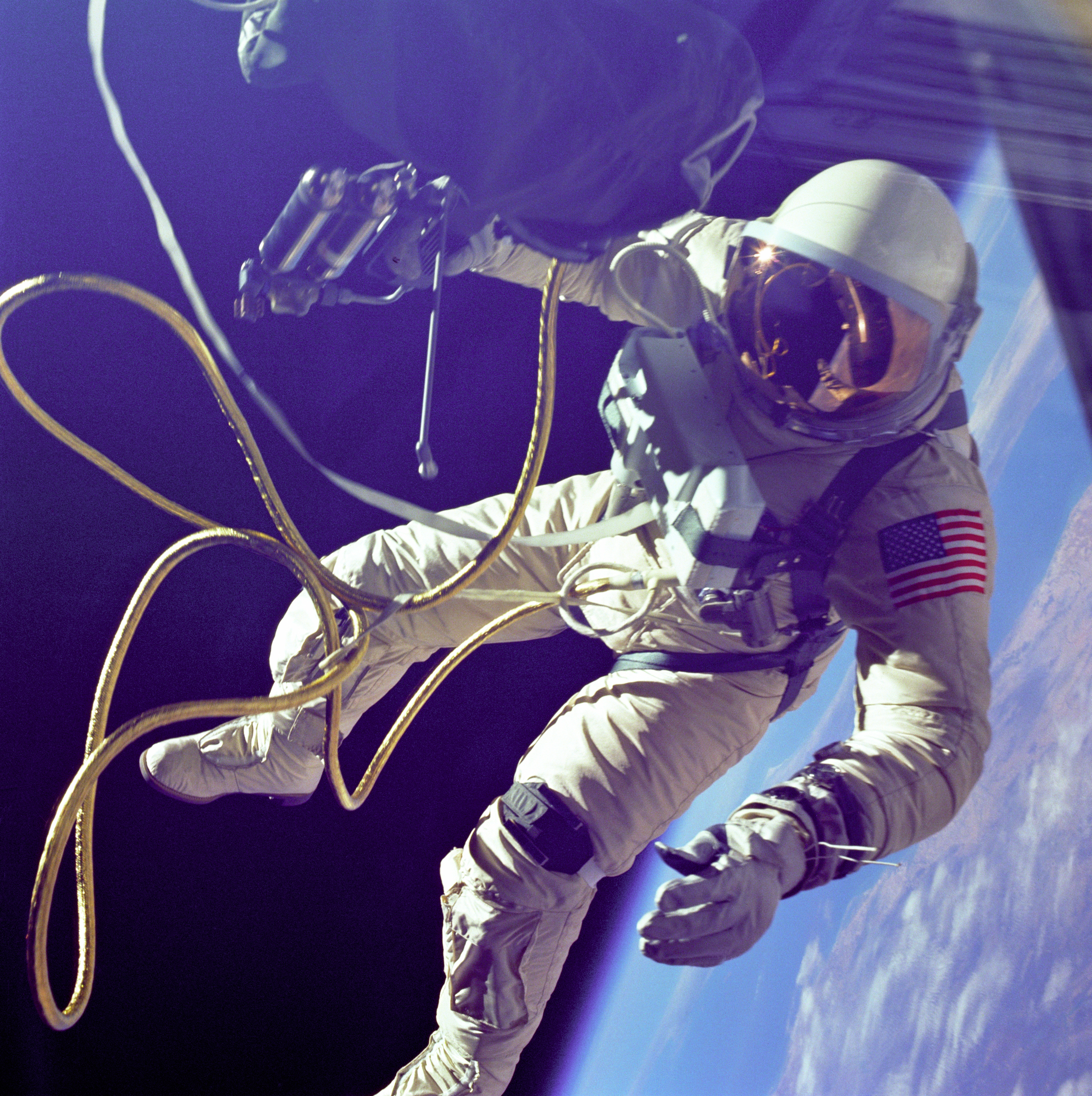
Ed White

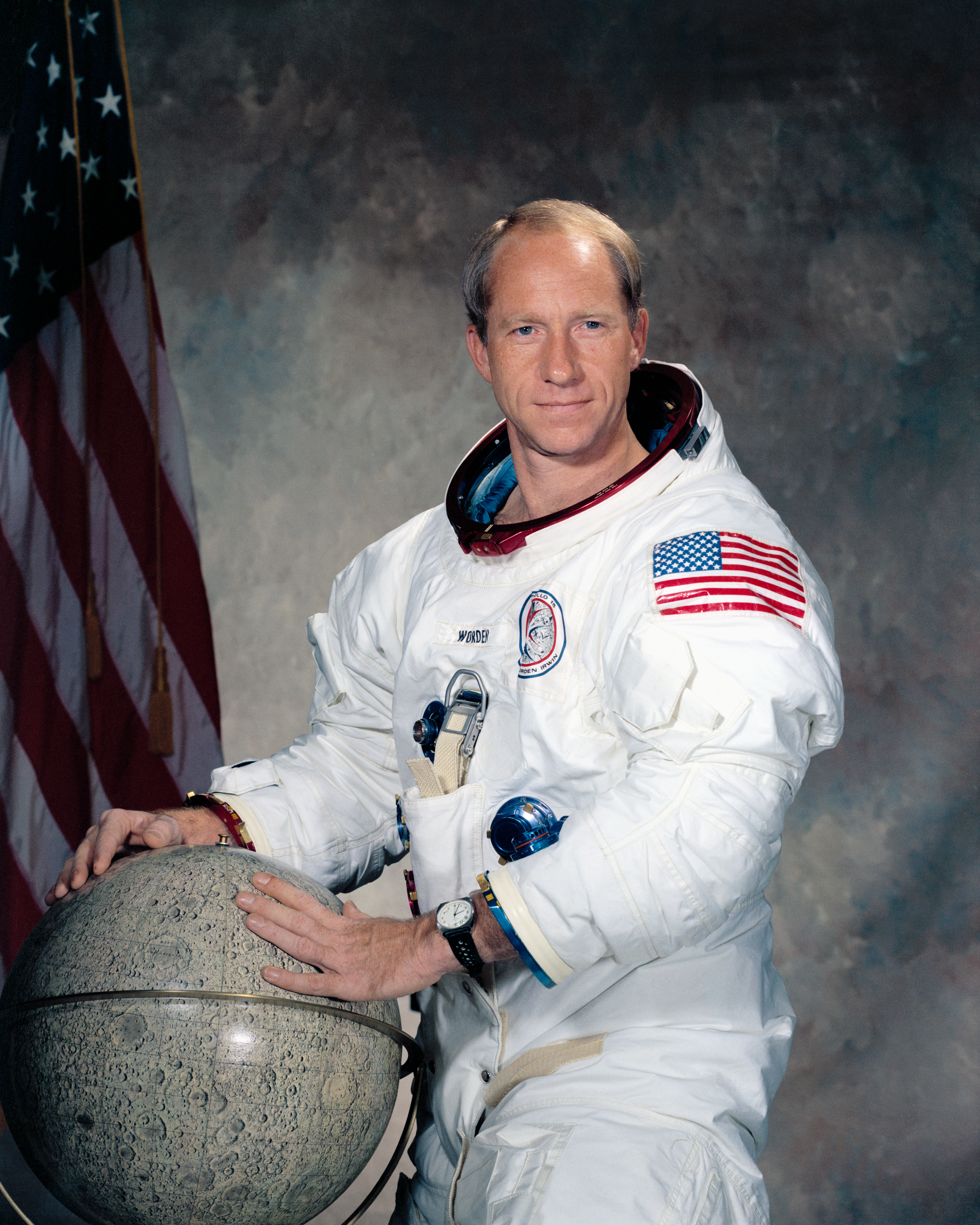
Alfred Worden

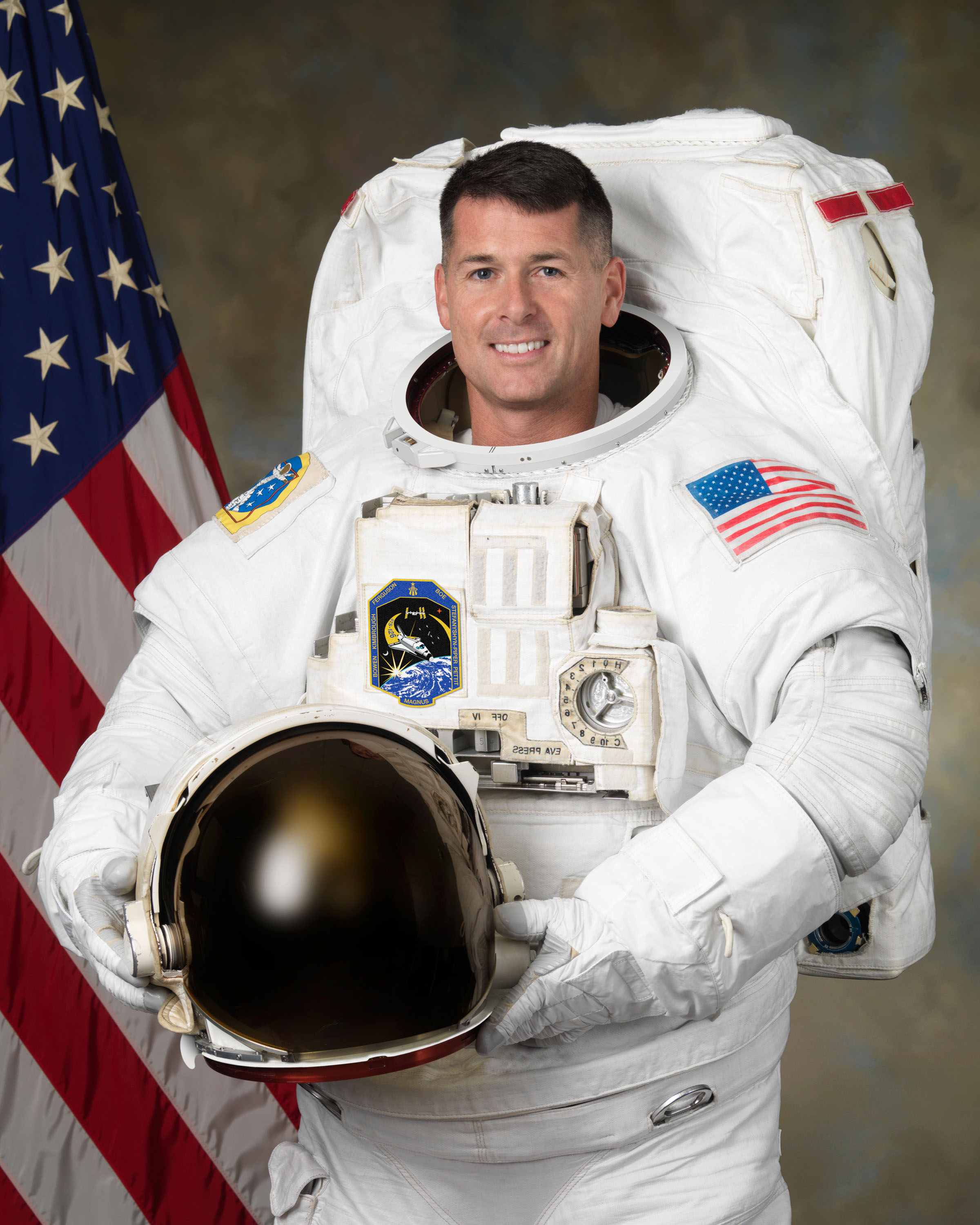
Shane Kimbrough

== Authors ==
This is a new list that requires significant work to be remotely complete. New, accurate, contributions are welcome and needed.

| Name | Class year | Notability | References |
|---|---|---|---|
| Philip St. George Cooke | 1827 | 1. Cooke's Cavalry Tactics at the Wayback Machine (archived March 12, 2008); 2. Scenes and Adventures in the Army, Lindsay & Blakiston, 1859 | |
| Jefferson Davis | 1828 | 1. The Rise and Fall of the Confederate Government. Vol. I. D. Appleton. 1881. OCLC 1084571088.; 2. The Rise and Fall of the Confederate Government. Vol. II. D. Appleton. 1881. OCLC 1084580578.; 3. Andersonville and Other War-Prisons. Belford. 1890. OCLC 902841567.; 4. A Short History of the Confederate States of America. Belford. 1890. OCLC 1084918966. | |
| Ulysses S. Grant | 1843 | 1. Personal memoirs of U.S. Grant, Vol I, C.L. Webster, 1885; 2. Personal memoirs of U.S. Grant, Vol II, C.L. Webster, 1885 | |
| Henry Martyn Robert | 1857 | Robert's Rules of Order. Manual of parliamentary procedure. It governs the meetings of a diverse range of organizations—including church groups, county commissions, homeowners associations, nonprofit associations, professional societies, school boards, and trade unions—that have adopted it as their parliamentary authority. First published in 1876 by S. C. Griggs & Company. Robert published four editions of the manual before his death in 1923, the last being the thoroughly revised and expanded Fourth Edition published as Robert's Rules of Order Revised in May 1915. Posthumous editions continued to be published, the most recent edition (12th edition) in 2020 by PublicAffairs (an imprint of Perseus Books LLC, a subsidiary of Hachette Book Group). | |
| George S. Patton | 1909 | Patton, George S. (1947), War as I Knew It, Boston, Massachusetts: Houghton Mifflin Co., ISBN 978-1-4193-2492-5. Published posthumously from his war diaries. | |
| Dwight D. Eisenhower | 1915 | 1. Crusade in Europe. His war memoirs. Published in 1948 by Doubleday.; 2. Mandate for Change, 1953–1956. Presidential memoir. Published in 1963 by Doubleday.; 3. The White House Years: Waging Peace 1956–1961. Presidential memoir. Published in 196 by Doubleday. | |
| Leslie Groves | 1918 | Groves, Leslie. Now It Can Be Told: The Story of the Manhattan Project. New York: Harper. ISBN 0-306-70738-1. OCLC 537684. | |
| Kenneth Nichols | 1929 | Nichols, Kenneth D. (1987). The Road to Trinity. New York: William Morrow and Company. ISBN 0-688-06910-X. OCLC 15223648. | |
| Edward M. Flanagan Jr. | 1943 | *The Angels: a History of the 11th Airborne Division 1943-1946. Washington DC: Infantry Journal Press. 1948.: Before the Battle: A Commonsense Guide to Leadership and Management. Presidio Press. 1985. ISBN 0-89141-210-7.; The Los Banos Raid. Presidio Press, 1986.; Corregidor, The Rock Force Assault. Presidio Press. 1988.; The Angels. Presidio Press. 1989.; The Battle for Panama, Inside Operation Just Cause. Brasseys. 1993.; The 11th Airborne Division. Turner Publishers. 1994.; Lightning, The 101st in Desert Storm. Brasseys. 1994.; The Rakkasans. Presidio Press. 1997.; Airborne: A Combat History of American Airborne Forces. Ballantine Books. 2002. | |
| Hal Moore | 1945 | 1. In 1975, the United States Army Center of Military History published Building a Volunteer Army: The Fort Ord Contribution, by Moore and Lieutenant Colonel Jeff M. Tuten. The 139-page paperback is a monograph concerning the Project VOLAR experiments during Moore's tenure in command of Fort Ord in 1971–1973 in preparation for the end of the draft and the implementation of the Modern Volunteer Army.; 2. In 1992, Moore wrote We Were Soldiers Once… And Young with co-author Joseph L. Galloway. The book was adapted into the 2002 film We Were Soldiers, which was filmed at Forts Benning and Hunter Liggett, depicting Moore's command of 1st Battalion, 7th Cavalry, at Fort Benning and in the Battle of Ia Drang.; 3. Moore and Joseph L. Galloway wrote another book together, a follow-up to their first collaboration. We Are Soldiers Still; A Journey Back to the Battlefields of Vietnam was published in 2008. Moore and Galloway reunited to give an interview on the book at the Pritzker Military Museum & Library on September 17, 2008. | |
| Frank Borman | 1950 | Borman, Frank; Serling, Robert J. (1988). Countdown: An Autobiography. New York: Silver Arrow. ISBN 0-688-07929-6. OCLC 17983615. | |
| John R. Galvin | 1954 | 1. Galvin, John (1969). Air Assault: the Development of Airmobile.; 2. Galvin, John (1997). Three Men of Boston. Brassey's. ISBN 1574881116.; 3. Galvin, John (2006). The Minute Men: The First Fight: Myths and Realities of the American Revolution. Potomac Books. ISBN 1597970700.; 4. Galvin, John (2015). Fighting the Cold War: A Soldier's Memoir. Lexington, Kentucky: University Press of Kentucky. | |
| Fred Malek | 1959 | Malek, Frederic V. (1 January 1979). Washington's Hidden Tragedy: The Failure to Make Government Work. Free Press. ISBN 978-0029197905. | |
| Andrew Bacevich | 1969 | * Bacevich, Andrew J. (1986). The Pentomic Era: The US Army between Korea and Vietnam (PDF). Washington, DC: National Defense University Press. OCLC 13525013.: Diplomat in Khaki: Frank Ross McCoy and American Foreign Policy, 1898–1949 (Lawrence, Kansas: University Press of Kansas, 1989) ISBN 0-7006-0401-4.; American Empire: The Realities and Consequences of U.S. Diplomacy (Cambridge, Massachusetts: Harvard University Press, 2004) ISBN 0-674-01375-1.; The New American Militarism: How Americans Are Seduced by War (New York: Oxford University Press, 2005) ISBN 0-19-517338-4.; The Long War: A New History of U.S. National Security Policy Since World War II (New York: Columbia University Press, 2007) ISBN 0-231-13158-5.; The Limits of Power: The End of American Exceptionalism (New York: Macmillan, 2008) ISBN 0-8050-8815-6.; Washington Rules: America's Path to Permanent War (New York: Macmillan, 2010) ISBN 0-8050-9141-6.; Breach of Trust: How Americans Failed Their Soldiers and Their Country (New York: Metropolitan Books, 2013) ISBN 978-0-8050-8296-8.; America's War for the Greater Middle East: A Military History (New York: Random House, 2016) ISBN 978-0-553-39393-4.; Twilight of the American Century (Notre Dame, Indiana: University of Notre Dame Press, 2018) ISBN 978-0-268-10485-6; The Age of Illusions: How America Squandered Its Cold War Victory (New York: Metropolitan Books, 2020) ISBN 978-1-2501-7508-3; After the Apocalypse: America's Role in a World Transformed (New York: Metropolitan Books, 2021) ISBN 978-1-2507-9599-1; On Shedding an Obsolete Past (Haymarket Books, November 15, 2022); Ravens on a Wire (Falling Marbles Press, July, 2024) | |
| Martin Dempsey | 1974 | 1. Radical Inclusion: What the Post-9/11 World Should Have Taught Us About Leadership. Co-wrote with Ori Brafman. Published March 6, 2018 by Missionday Publishing.; 2. No Time For Spectators: The Lessons That Mattered Most From West Point To The West Wing. Published May 12, 2020, by Missionday Publishing. | |
| Robert L. Caslen | 1975 | The Character Edge: Leading and Winning with Integrity. Co-wrote with Michael D. Matthews. Published October 13, 2021, by St. Martin's Press. | |
| Stanley A. McChrystal | 1976 | 1. McChrystal, Stanley (2013). My Share of the Task: A Memoir. New York: Portfolio/Penguin. ISBN 9781591844754. OCLC 780480413.; 2.McChrystal, Stanley; Collins, Tantum; Silverman, David; Fussell, Chris (2015). Team of Teams: New Rules of Engagement for a Complex World. New York: Portfolio/Penguin. ISBN 9781591847489. OCLC 881094064.: 3. McChrystal, Stanley; Eggers, Jeff; Mangone, Jason (2018). Leaders: Myth and Reality. New York: Portfolio/Penguin. ISBN 9780525534372.; 4.McChrystal, Stanley; Butrico, Anna (2021). Risk: A User's Guide. Portfolio. ISBN 978-0593192207. | |
| Robert (Bob) Mayer | 1981 | Former Green Beret. Mayer has authored over 60 novels in multiple genres, selling more than 4 million books, including the #1 series Area 51, Atlantis, and The Green Berets. He has written under the pen names Joe Dalton, Robert Doherty, Greg Donegan, and Bob McGuire. | |
| Peter Mansoor | 1982 | 1. Schwerpunkt, the Second Battle of Sedan, 10–15 May 1940. Fort Knox, Ky: Command and Staff Dept., U.S. Army Armor School, 1986. OCLC 38192984; 2. Building Blocks of Victory: American Infantry Divisions in the War against Germany and Italy, 1941 – 1945. PhD Diss, 1995. OCLC 243855681; 3. The GI Offensive in Europe: The Triumph of American Infantry Divisions, 1941–1945. Lawrence, Kansas: University Press of Kansas, 1999. ISBN 070060958X OCLC 40595257; 4. USAREUR 2010: Harnessing the Potential of NATO Enlargement. Carlisle Barracks, PA: U.S. Army War College, 2003. OCLC 52550086; 5. Baghdad at Sunrise: A Brigade Commander's War in Iraq. New Haven, Conn: Yale University Press, 2009. ISBN 9780300158472 OCLC 317471909; 6. Surge: My Journey with General David Petraeus and the Remaking of the Iraq War. New Haven: Yale University Press, 2015, c2013. ISBN 9780300209372 OCLC 951132242 | |
| H. R. McMaster | 1984 | Dereliction of Duty: Lyndon Johnson, Robert McNamara, the Joint Chiefs of Staff, and the Lies That Led to Vietnam. The book presents a case indicting former U.S. President Lyndon B. Johnson and his principal civilian and military advisers for losing the Vietnam War. The book was based on McMaster's Ph.D. dissertation at University of North Carolina at Chapel Hill. Published in 1997 by Harper. | |
| Mark T. Esper | 1986 | A Sacred Oath: Memoirs of a Secretary of Defense During Extraordinary Times. Memoir. Published May 10, 2022, by William Morrow. NYT Bestseller. | |
| Mark Green | 1986 | Green, Mark (2011). A Night With Saddam. Lulu.com. p. 236. ISBN 978-0557153190. | |
| Mike Pompeo | 1986 | Never Give an Inch: Fighting for the America I Love. Memoir. Published on January 24, 2023, by Broadside Books. It reached No. 33 on The New York Times Best Seller list in 2023. | |
| David H. McCormick | 1987 | 1. The Downsized Warrior: America's Army in Transition. Published February 1998 by NYU Press.; 2. Superpower in Peril: A Battle Plan to Renew America. Published March 2023 by Center Street (Hachette Book Group). | |
| Kelly Perdew | 1989 | Take Command: 10 Leadership Principles I Learned in the Military and Put to Work for Donald Trump. Published January 23, 2006 by Regnery Publishing. | |
| Matthew J. Louis | 1991 | 1. Mission Transition: Navigating the Opportunities and Obstacles to Your Post-Military Career. Published September 24, 2019 by HarperCollins Leadership.; 2. Hiring Veterans: How To Leverage Military Talent for Organizational Growth. Published September 4, 2023 by Career Press. | |
| Paula Broadwell | 1995 | All In: The Education of General David Petraeus. Co-wrote with Vernon Loeb. Published on January 24, 2012, by Broadside Books. | |

== Businesspeople ==
- Henry A. du Pont, class of 1861, President and general manager of Wilmington & Western Railroad (1879–1899)
- Robert E. Wood, class of 1900, chairman and CEO of Sears, Roebuck (1939–1954); responsible for shifting the company's focus from a mail-order catalog company to a department store retailer; started AllState Insurance as a subsidiary of Sears; served as the Quartermaster of the Army in World War I and as chief quartermaster during the construction of the Panama Canal
- William T. Seawell, class of 1941, chairman and CEO of Pan Am Airways (1971–1981)
- Robert F. McDermott, class of 1943, former chairman and CEO of United Services Automobile Association (USAA)
- John F. Donahue, class of 1946, founder and Chairman of Federated Investors ($400 billion asset management firm)
- Frank Borman, class of 1950, President of Eastern Airlines (1975–1986)
- Walter F. Ulmer, class of 1952, President and CEO of Center for Creative Leadership (1985–1994)
- Rand Araskog, class of 1953, President, chairman, and CEO of ITT Communications
- Dana G. Mead, class of 1957, chairman and CEO of Tenneco (1994–1999), Chairman of MIT Corporation (since 2003)
- Pete Dawkins, class of 1959, former chairman and CEO of Primerica Financial Services, Vice-chairman and EVP of Travelers Insurance, Vice Chairman of Bain and Company, Vice Chairman of Citi Global Wealth Management, currently Senior Partner at Flintlock Capital
- Fred Malek, class of 1959, founder and Chairman of Thayer Capital Partners, Chairman of Northwest Airlines
- Frank J. Caufield, co-founder of venture capital firm Kleiner Perkins Caufield & Byers
- Albert Dunlap, class of 1960, CEO of Scott Paper and Sunbeam
- Jim Kimsey, class of 1962, chairman and co-founder of AOL
- Daniel W. Christman, class of 1965, Superintendent of USMA, 1996–2001; Chairman of Ultralife Corporation, SVP of International Affairs for US Chamber of Commerce (since 2003)
- John B. Ritch III, class of 1965, chairman and co-founder of Calivita International (since 1992)
- William P. Foley II, class of 1967, former CEO and current Chairman of Fidelity National Information Services
- Marshall Larsen, class of 1970, chairman and CEO of Goodrich, Corporation (since 2003)
- William Roedy, class of 1970, CEO and managing director of MTV Europe, president and chief executive officer (CEO) of MTV International (until 1989-2011)
- Bob McDonald, class of 1975, CEO of Procter & Gamble
- Ken Hicks, class of 1974, President and CEO of Foot Locker, former President of JCPenney
- William Albrecht, class of 1974, President of Occidental Oil and Gas
- Vincent Viola, class of 1977, former Chairman of NYMEX (2001–2004), CEO of Virtu Financial, owner and member of Chairman's Council of the New Jersey Nets
- Keith McLoughlin, class of 1978, President and CEO of Electrolux
- Alex Gorsky, class of 1982, CEO of Johnson & Johnson
- Mark Green, class of 1986, founder and former CEO of Align MD
- Anthony J. Guzzi, class of 1986, President and CEO of EMCOR Group, Inc., the world's largest specialty construction, facilities services, energy infrastructure provider and a Fortune 500 company
- David McCormick, class of 1987, CEO of Bridgewater Associates, one of the world's largest hedge funds, from 2020 to 2022. Named president of FreeMarkets in 2001 and was named chief executive officer in 2002; he successfully sold FreeMarkets to Ariba in 2004 for approximately $500 million.
- Mark Clouse, class of 1990, President and CEO of Campbell's
- Anthony Noto, class of 1991, former CFO and COO of Twitter and current CEO of SoFi
- John Ham, class of 2000, Ustream Founder, CEO and Chairman
- Brad Hunstable, class of 2001, founder and President of Ustream.TV
- Dawn Halfaker, class of 2001, founder and former CEO of Halfaker and Associates, an information technology services firm acquired by SAIC in 2021
- Tom Shull, class of 1973, CEO of AAFES

== Engineers ==
| Name | Class year | Notability | References |
|---|---|---|---|
| John Williams Gunnison | 1837 | Captain; topographical engineer; supervised one of the Pacific Railroad surveys in 1853; Gunnison, Colorado and Gunnison, Utah are named in his honor | |
| Gouverneur K. Warren | 1850 | Major General; commanded at the Battle of Gettysburg for the defense of Little Round Top, Chief of Engineers of the Army of the Potomac during the American Civil War; participated in topographical and railroad explorations of the Mississippi River and trans-Mississippi West | |
| Orlando Metcalfe Poe | 1856 | Brigadier General; American Civil War; lighthouse, harbor, and river engineer; responsible for much of the early lighthouse construction on the Great Lakes; built the Poe Lock of the Soo Locks in Sault Ste. Marie, Michigan; Poe Reef Light in Lake Huron is named in his honor | |
| John Moulder Wilson | 1860 | Brigadier General; recipient of the Medal of Honor for his actions at the Battle of Malvern Hill though acutely ill; Superintendent of the Academy (1889–1893); Chief of Engineers (1897–1901) | |
| George Washington Goethals | 1880 | Major General; chief engineer of the Panama Canal; Governor of the Panama Canal Zone (1914–1917) | |
| Hiram Martin Chittenden | 1884 | Brigadier General; Hiram M. Chittenden was the designer and engineer in charge of designing the Roosevelt Arch, various bridges, and road system in Yellowstone National Park. Additionally, was the lead engineer of the Ballad Locks (AKA Chittenden Locks) in Seattle Washington. The Chittenden Memorial Bridge in Yellowstone is named in his honor. | |
| Lunsford E. Oliver | 1913 | Major General; initiated the research that led to the development of the steel treadway bridge; Commander of 5th Armored Division during World War II | |
| Brehon B. Somervell | 1914 | general in the United States Army and Commanding General of the Army Service Forces in World War II. From 1936 to 1940 Somervell was head of the Works Progress Administration in New York City, where he was responsible for a series of Great Depression relief works, including the construction of LaGuardia Airport. Led the construction of Pentagon. | |
| Hugh John Casey | 1918 | Major General; chief engineer of South West Pacific theatre of World War II in World War II; initial designer of The Pentagon | |
| Leslie Groves | 1918 | Lieutenant General. United States Army Corps of Engineers officer who oversaw the construction of the Pentagon and directed the Manhattan Project, a top secret research project that developed the atomic bomb during World War II. | |

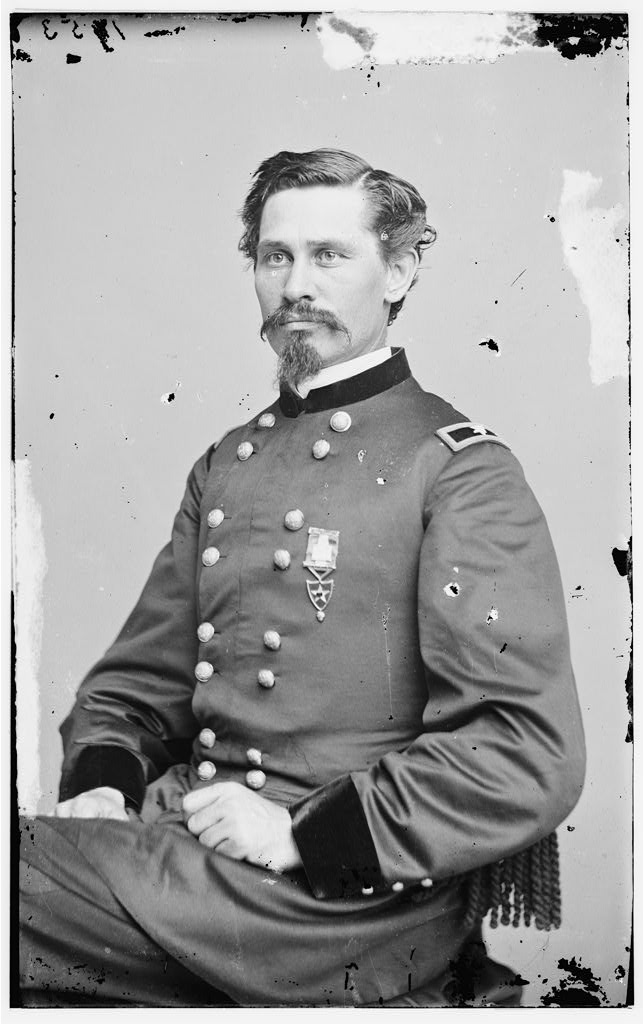
Orlando Metcalfe Poe

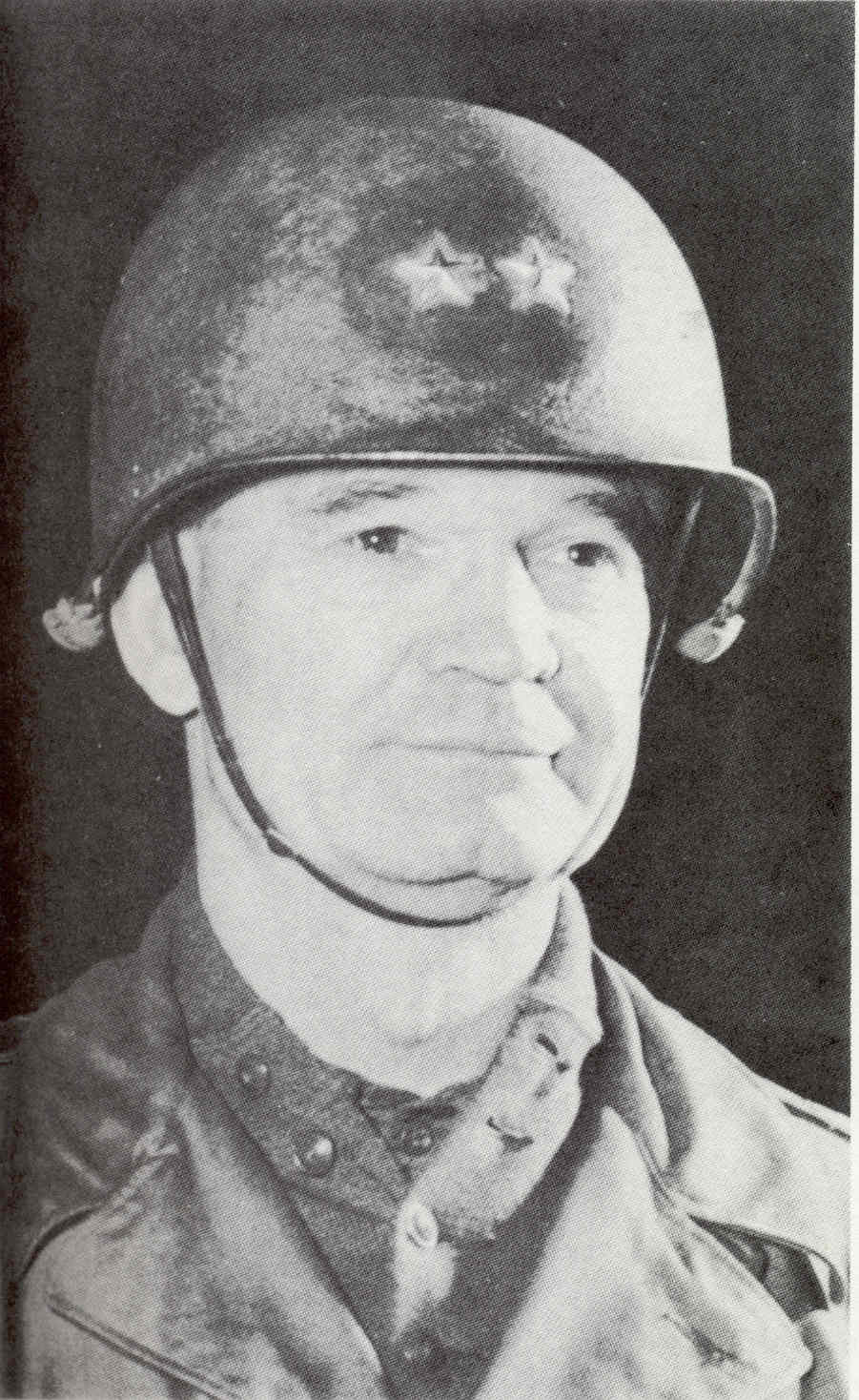
Lunsford E. Oliver

== Government ==
=== Heads of state or government ===
| Name | Class year | Notability | References |
|---|---|---|---|
| Jefferson Davis | 1828 | Mexican–American War veteran; U.S. Representative from Mississippi (1845–1846); U.S. Senator from Mississippi (1847–1851); United States Secretary of War (1853–1857); President of the Confederate States of America (1861–1865) | |
| Ulysses S. Grant | 1843 | General of the Army of the United States; Mexican–American War; Siege of Vicksburg, Battle of Chattanooga, Siege of Petersburg, accepted Confederate surrender at Appomattox Court House; 18th President of the United States (1869–1877) | |
| Dwight D. Eisenhower | 1915 | General of the Army; trained tank crews in Pennsylvania during World War I; World War II; commander of European Theater of Operations and Supreme Headquarters Allied Expeditionary Force (1942–1945); 1st Military Governor of American Occupation Zone in Germany (1945); President of Columbia University (1948–1950, 1952–1953); 1st Supreme Allied Commander Europe (1951–1952); 34th President of the United States (1953–1961) | |
| Anastasio Somoza Debayle | 1946 | General; Head of the Nicaraguan National Guard (1947–1967); President of Nicaragua (1967–1972; 1974–1979) | |
| Fidel V. Ramos | 1950 | General; Korean War and Vietnam War veteran; Chief of the Philippine Constabulary (1970–1986); Chief of Staff of the Armed Forces of the Philippines (1986–1988); Secretary of National Defense (1988–1991); President of the Philippines (1992–1998) | |
| José María Figueres | 1979 | Entered Costa Rican government service after graduating from the Academy; Minister of Foreign Trade (1986–1988); Minister of Agriculture (1988–1990); President of Costa Rica (1994–1998) | |
| Hun Manet | 1999 | General; Deputy Commander-in-Chief of the Royal Cambodian Armed Forces (2018–2023); Vice President of the Cambodian People's Party (2023–); Member of the National Assembly of Cambodia (2023–); Prime Minister of Cambodia (2023–) | |

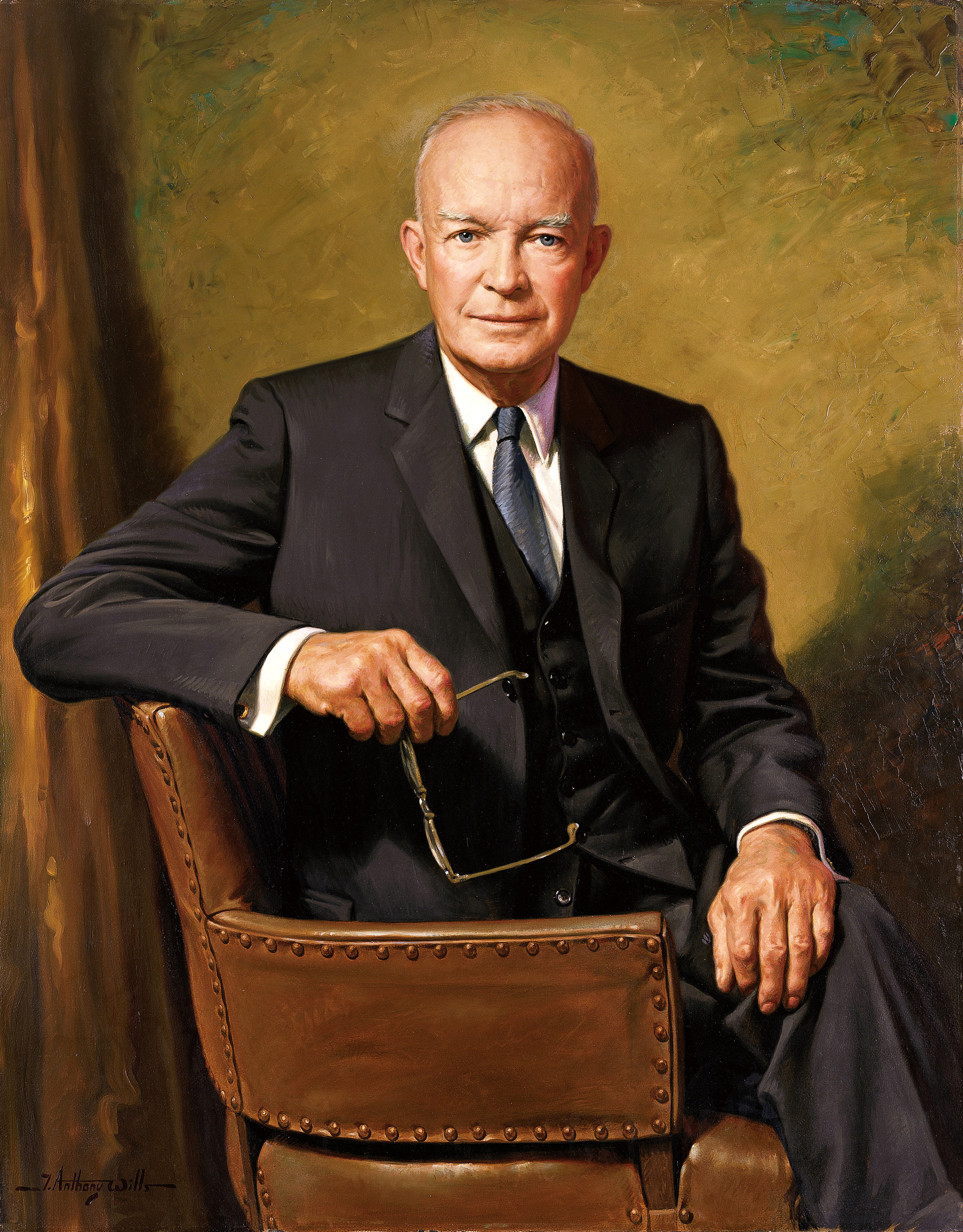
Dwight D. Eisenhower

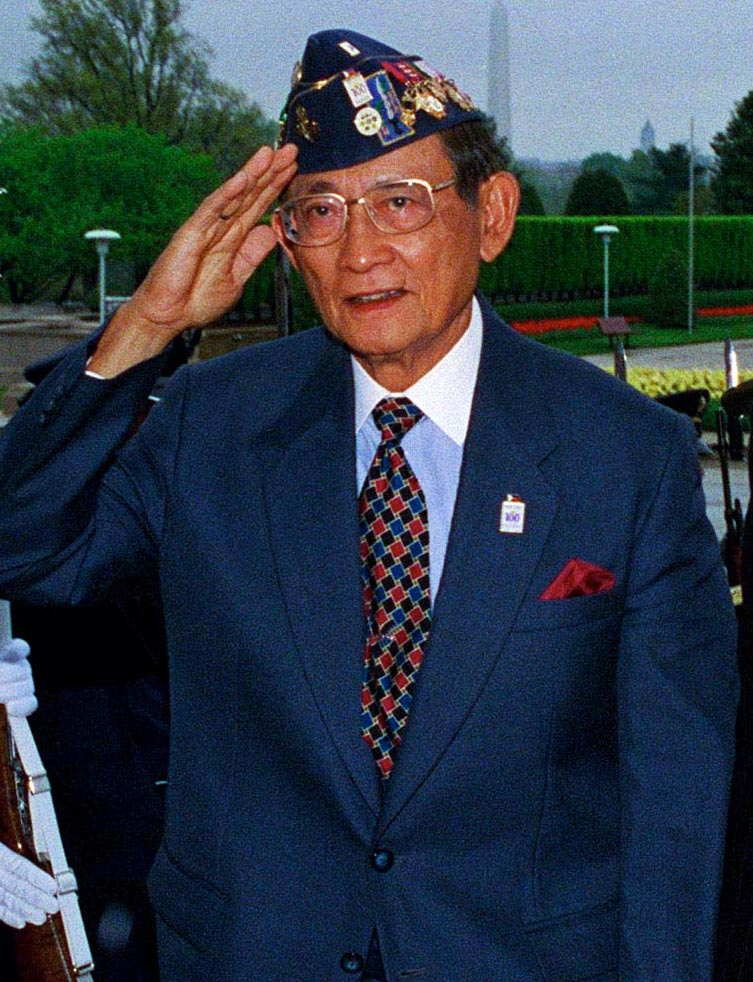
Fidel V. Ramos

=== Directors of the Central Intelligence Agency ===
- Hoyt Vandenberg, class of 1923, DCI 10 June 1946 – 1 May 1947
- David Petraeus, class of 1974, DCIA 6 September 2011 – 9 November 2012
- Mike Pompeo, class of 1986, DCIA 23 January 2017 – 26 April 2018 (became United States Secretary of State)

=== Cabinet members ===
- Andrew J. Donelson, class of 1820, President's Secretary (1829–1837)
- Jefferson Davis, class of 1828, United States Secretary of War (1853–1857)
- Montgomery Blair, class of 1835, United States Postmaster General (1861–1864)
- William Tecumseh Sherman, class of 1840, United States Secretary of War (1869)
- Gustavus Woodson Smith, class of 1842, Confederate States Secretary of War (1862)
- John Schofield, class of 1853, United States Secretary of War (1868–1869)
- Marshall Carter, class of 1931, Deputy Director of Central Intelligence (1962–1965) and Director of the National Security Agency (1965–1969)
- Rafael M. Ileto, class of 1943, Philippine Secretary of National Defense (1986–1988)
- Brent Scowcroft, class of 1947, National Security Advisor (1974–1977, 1989–1993)
- Alexander Haig, class of 1947, United States Secretary of State (1981–1982)
- Fidel V. Ramos, class of 1950, Philippines Secretary of National Defense (1988–1991)
- John Block, class of 1957, United States Secretary of Agriculture (1981–1986)
- Jim Nicholson, class of 1961, United States Secretary of Veterans Affairs (2005–2007)
- Barry McCaffrey, class of 1964, US Drug Czar (1996–2001)
- Eric K. Shinseki, class of 1965, United States Secretary of Veterans Affairs (2009–2014)
- James Peake, class of 1966, United States Secretary of Veterans Affairs (2007–2009)
- Robert Alan McDonald, class of 1975, United States Secretary of Veterans Affairs (2014–2017)
- Mike Pompeo, class of 1986, United States Secretary of State (2018–2021), former Director of the Central Intelligence Agency (2017–2018)
- Mark Esper, class of 1986, 27th United States Secretary of Defense (2019–2020), former 23rd United States Secretary of the Army (2017–2019)
- Lloyd Austin, class of 1975, 28th United States Secretary of Defense (2021–2025)

=== Secretaries of the Army ===
- Howard Hollis Callaway, class of 1949, 11th United States Secretary of the Army (1973-1975)
- Louis Caldera, class of 1978, 17th United States Secretary of the Army (1998-2001)
- Thomas E. White, class of 1967, 18th United States Secretary of the Army (2001-2004)
- Mark Esper, class of 1986, 23rd United States Secretary of the Army (2017–2019)

=== Ambassadors ===
| Name | Class year | Notability | References |
|---|---|---|---|
| Alexander Lawton | 1839 | Brigadier General CSA; graduated from Harvard Law School, class of 1842; seriously wounded at the Battle of Antietam in September 1862 and served as the Confederacy's second Quartermaster General for the remainder of the war; became president of the American Bar Association in 1882; served as minister to Austria-Hungary (1887–1889) | |
| James Longstreet | 1842 | Major USA, Lieutenant General CSA; Mexican–American War; excelled in several battles during the American Civil War, including the Second Battle of Bull Run and Battle of Antietam; severely wounded at the Battle of the Wilderness; ambassador to the Ottoman Empire (1897–1904) | |
| William Rosecrans | 1842 | Major General; commander Army of the Cumberland, Battle of Stones River, Tullahoma Campaign, Battle of Chickamauga; U.S. Minister to Mexico (1868–1969); U.S. Representative from California (1881–1885); Register of the Treasury (1885–1893) | |
| Horace Porter | 1860 | Brigadier general; recipient of the Medal of Honor for his actions at the Battle of Chickamauga; Ambassador to France (1897–1905) | |
| Maxwell Davenport Taylor | 1922 | General; instituted the Cadet Honor Code at the Academy; commander of 101st Airborne Division (1944–1945); Chief of Staff of the Army (1955–1959); Chairman of the Joint Chiefs of Staff (1962–1964); United States Ambassador to South Vietnam (1964–1965) | |
| Jerrold M. North | 1954 | Ambassador; Career Foreign Service Officer; served in the Army before entering the Department of State. As a member of the US diplomatic corps, Jerry served overseas in Europe, Africa and the Far East and was the first US ambassador to Djibouti, (1980–1982); Armed Forces Staff College in Norfolk, VA, as Foreign Affairs Advisor (1982–1984); Department of State, as Director of Employee Performance (1984–1985) | |

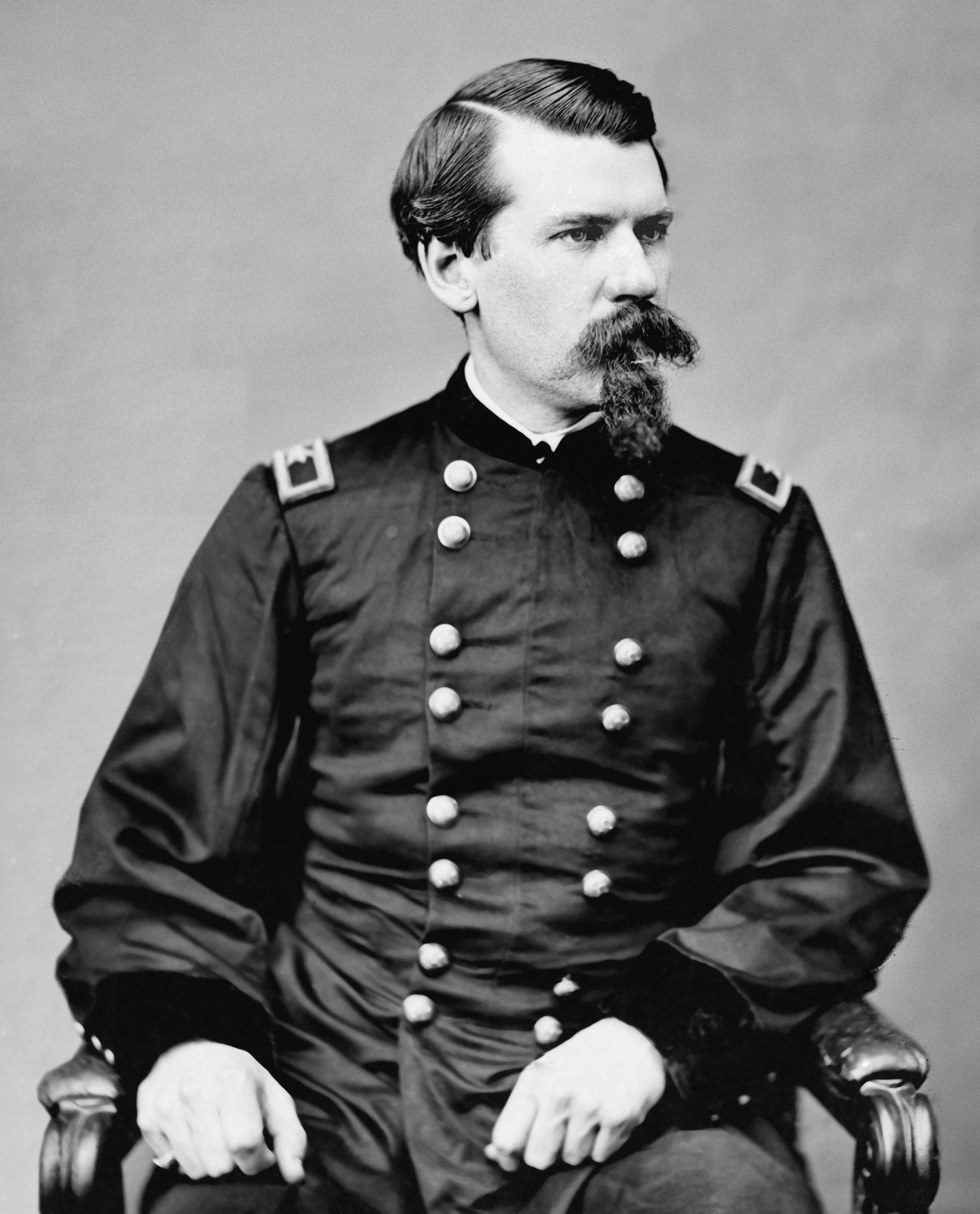
Horace Porter

- Andrew J. Donelson, class of 1820, Chargé d'affaires of the United States to the Republic of Texas (1845), U.S. Minister to Prussia (1846–49), U.S. vice presidential candidate (1856)
- Rufus King, class of 1833, U.S. Minister to the Papal States (1863–1867)
- William Woods Averell, class of 1855, U.S. Consul General to British North America (1866–1869)
- Hugh Judson Kilpatrick, class of 1856, U.S. Minister to Chile, 1866–70, 1881
- Frederick Dent Grant, class of 1871, U.S. Minister to Austro-Hungarian Empire (1890–1893)
- James Maurice Gavin, class of 1929, U.S. Ambassador to France (1961–62)
- John Eisenhower, class of 1944, U.S. Ambassador to Belgium (1969–1971)
- David Manker Abshire, class of 1951, U.S. Ambassador to NATO (1983–1987)
- John Galvin, class of 1954, U.S. Ambassador to Bosnian Peace Negotiations
- Jim Nicholson, class of 1961, U.S. Ambassador to the Vatican (2001–2005)
- John B. Ritch III, class of 1965, U.S. Ambassador to United Nations International Organizations in Vienna (1993–2001)
- Robert M. Kimmitt, class of 1969, U.S. Ambassador to Germany (1991–1993)
- William B. Taylor Jr., class of 1969, U.S. Ambassador to Ukraine (2006–2009, 2019–2020)
- John Abizaid, class of 1973, U.S. Ambassador to Saudi Arabia (2019-2021)
- Karl Eikenberry, class of 1973, U.S. Ambassador to Afghanistan (2009–2011)
- Matthew Klimow, class of 1974, U.S. Ambassador to Turkmenistan (2019–present), acting State Department Inspector General (2020)
- Douglas Lute, class of 1975, U.S. Ambassador to NATO (2013-2017)

=== Governors (civil) ===
| Name | Class year | Notability | References |
|---|---|---|---|
| Paul Octave Hébert | 1840 | Colonel USA, brigadier general in Confederate States Army; Mexican–American War; Governor of Louisiana (1853–1856); served at the Siege of Vicksburg and in Texas | |
| Simon Bolivar Buckner | 1844 | Captain USA, Lieutenant General CSA; Mexican–American War; Battle of Fort Donelson, Battle of Perryville, Battle of Chickamauga; Governor of Kentucky (1887–1891) | |
| Dabney H. Maury | 1846 | Lieutenant colonel USA, Major General CSA; son of Naval officer John Minor Maury; Mexican–American War, cavalry officer in Oregon and Texas; Battle of Pea Ridge, Battle of Corinth, Siege of Vicksburg; United States Ambassador to Colombia (1887–1889) | |
| Fitzhugh Lee | 1856 | Second Lieutenant USA, Major General CSA; American Indian Wars; First Battle of Bull Run, Battle of Antietam, Battle of Gettysburg, Battle of Opequon, led the last charge of the Confederates on 9 April 1865 at Farmville, Virginia; Governor of Virginia (1886–1890) | |
| John S. Marmaduke | 1857 | Second Lieutenant US Army, Major General CSA; Utah War; Battle of Shiloh, Battle of Cape Girardeau, Red River Campaign, mortally wounded fellow Confederate general and West Point graduate Lucius M. Walker in a duel; Governor of Missouri (1885–1887) | |
| Guy Vernor Henry | 1861 | Brigadier General; recipient of the Medal of Honor for actions repulsing an enemy attack at the Battle of Cold Harbor; son Major General Guy Vernor Henry Jr. is an Academy alumnus, class of 1894; Governor of Puerto Rico (1898–1899) | |
| George Washington Goethals | 1880 | Major General; chief engineer of the Panama Canal; Governor of the Panama Canal Zone (1914–1917) | |
| Julian Larcombe Schley | 1903 | Major General; World War I; topographic and civil engineer; Governor of the Panama Canal Zone (1926–1932); Chief of Engineers (1937–1941) | |

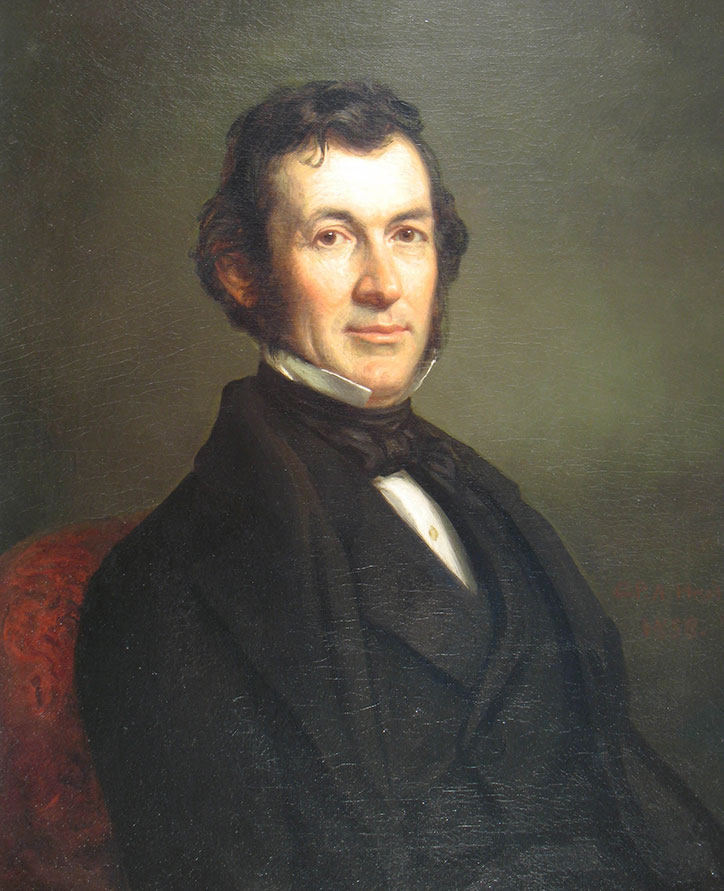
Robert McLane

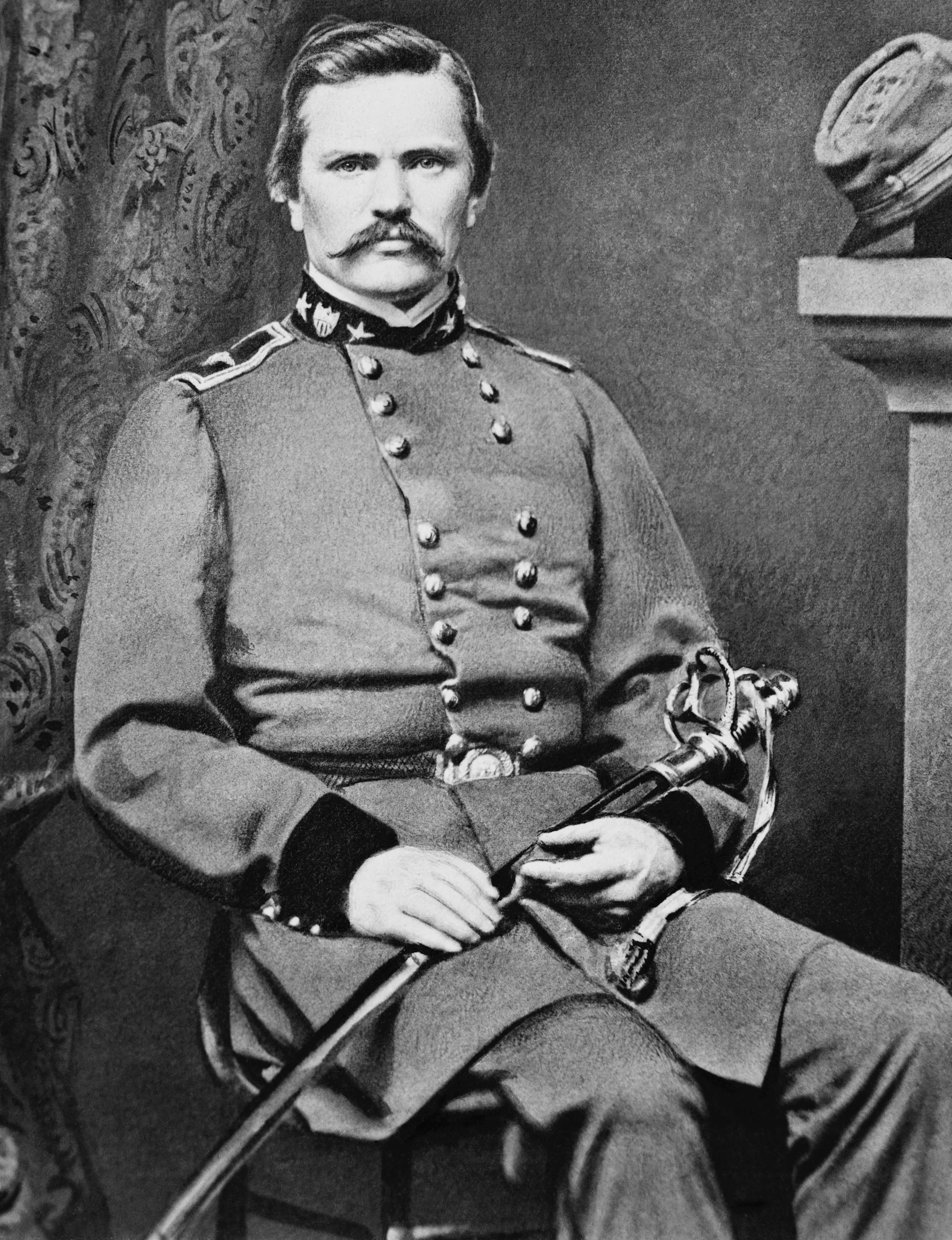
Simon Bolivar Buckner

- Robert Francis Withers Allston, class of 1821, Governor of South Carolina (1856–58)
- David Wallace, class of 1821, Governor of Indiana (1837–1840)
- Robert Milligan McLane, class of 1837, Governor of Maryland (1884–85)
- Isaac Ingalls Stevens, class of 1839, Governor of Washington Territory (1853–1857)
- George Stoneman, class of 1846, Governor of California (1883–1887)
- George B. McClellan, class of 1846, Governor of New Jersey (1878–81)
- Ambrose Burnside, class of 1847, Governor of Rhode Island (1866–69)
- Francis Redding Tillou Nicholls, class of 1855, Governor of Louisiana (1877–80, 88–92)
- William H. Upham, class of 1866, Governor of Wisconsin (1895–1897)
- Alexander Oswald Brodie, class of 1870, Governor of Arizona Territory (1902–05)
- Charles H. Martin, class of 1887, Governor of Oregon (1935–39)
- Chester Harding, class of 1889, Governor of Panama Canal Zone (1917–21)
- Jay Johnson Morrow, class of 1891, Governor of Panama Canal Zone (1921–24)
- Meriwether L. Walker, class of 1893, Governor of Panama Canal Zone (1924–28)
- Harry Burgess, class of 1895, Governor of Panama Canal Zone (1928–32)
- Clarence S. Ridley, class of 1905, Governor of Panama Canal Zone (1936–40)
- Glen E. Edgerton, class of 1908, Governor of Panama Canal Zone (1940–44)
- Joseph C. Mehaffey, class of 1911, Governor of Panama Canal Zone (1944–48)
- Francis K. Newcomer, class of 1913, Governor of Panama Canal Zone (1948–52)
- John S. Seybold, class of 1920, Governor of Panama Canal Zone (1952–56)
- William E. Potter, class of 1933, Governor of Panama Canal Zone (1956–60)
- William A. Carter, class of 1930, Governor of Panama Canal Zone (1960–62)
- Robert John Fleming, class of 1928, Governor of Panama Canal Zone (1962–67)
- David Stuart Parker, class of 1940, Governor of Panama Canal Zone (1971–75)
- Harold Parfitt, class of 1943, Governor of Panama Canal Zone (1975–79)
- Warren E. Hearnes, class of 1946, Governor of Missouri (1965–1973)
- Dave Heineman, class of 1970, Governor of Nebraska (2005–2015)
- John Bel Edwards, class of 1988, Governor of Louisiana (2016–2024)

=== Governors (military) ===
| Name | Class year | Notability | References |
|---|---|---|---|
| Thomas H. Ruger | 1854 | Major General; military engineer and lawyer; veteran of Civil War; military engineer and lawyer; military Governor of Georgia (1868); Superintendent of the Academy (1871–1876) | |
| Wesley Merritt | 1860 | Major General; veteran of the Civil War and Spanish–American War; first Military Governor of the Philippines | |
| Adelbert Ames | 1861 | Major General; recipient of the Medal of Honor for his continuing a fierce fight though severely wounded in his right thigh at First Battle of Bull Run; Governor of Mississippi (1868–1870) and (1874–1876); United States Senator from Mississippi (1870–1874) | |
| Dwight D. Eisenhower | 1915 | General of the Army; trained tank crews in Pennsylvania during World War I; World War II; commander of European Theater of Operations and Supreme Headquarters Allied Expeditionary Force (1942–1945); 1st Military Governor of American Occupation Zone in Germany (1945); President of Columbia University (1948–1950, 1952–1953); 34th President of the United States (1953–1961); 1st Supreme Allied Commander Europe (1951–1952) | |
| Paul Caraway | 1929 | High Commissioner of the United States Civil Administration of the Ryukyu Islands (1961–1964) | |

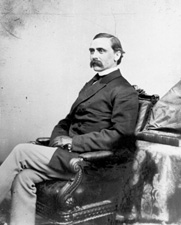
Adelbert Ames

- Thomas Childs, class of 1814, military governor of Puebla, Mexico
- John H. Martindale, class of 1835, military Governor of Washington, D.C.
- Rufus Saxton, class of 1849, military governor of the Department of the South
- Fitzhugh Lee, class of 1856, military governor of Havana, Cuba
- Philip Sheridan, class of 1853, military governor of the Fifth Military District
- Douglas MacArthur, class of 1903, military governor of Japan
- George S. Patton, class of 1909, military governor of Bavaria
- Joseph T. McNarney, class of 1915, military governor of U.S. Occupation Zone, Germany
- Matthew Ridgway, class of 1917, military governor of Japan
- Lucius D. Clay, class of 1918, military Governor in West Germany noted for Berlin Airlift

=== Legislators ===
| Name | Class year | Notability | References |
|---|---|---|---|
| Jefferson Davis | 1828 | Mexican–American War veteran; U.S. Representative from Mississippi (1845–1846); U.S. Senator from Mississippi (1847–1851); United States Secretary of War (1853–1857); president of the Confederate States of America (1861–1865) | |
| Humphrey Marshall | 1832 | Second Lieutenant USA, Brigadier General CSA; Mexican–American War veteran with Kentucky militia; U.S. Representative from Kentucky (1849–1852), (1855–1859); resigned from the Confederate Army in June 1863; member of Second Confederate Congress | |
| William Rosecrans | 1842 | Major General; commander Army of the Cumberland, Battle of Stones River, Tullahoma Campaign, Battle of Chickamauga; U.S. Minister to Mexico (1868–1969); U.S. Representative from California (1881–1885); Register of the Treasury (1885–1893) | |
| Samuel B. Maxey | 1846 | First Lieutenant USA, Major General CSA; Mexican–American War; Battle of Shiloh, Siege of Port Hudson; United States Senator from Texas (1875–1887) | |
| George B. McClellan | 1846 | Major General; developed the McClellan Saddle; organized the Army of the Potomac after the Union forces were defeated at First Battle of Bull Run, Peninsula Campaign, Battle of Antietam; son George B. McClellan Jr. served as United States Representative from New York (1895–1903) and as Mayor of New York City (1904–1909) | |
| Adelbert Ames | 1861 | Major General; recipient of the Medal of Honor for his continuing a fierce fight though severely wounded in his right thigh at First Battle of Bull Run; Governor of Mississippi (1868–1870) and (1874–1876); United States Senator from Mississippi (1870–1874) | |
| Henry A. du Pont | 1861 | Lieutenant Colonel; recipient of the Medal of Honor for actions repulsing an enemy attack at the Battle of Cedar Creek; United States Senator from Delaware (1906–1917) | |

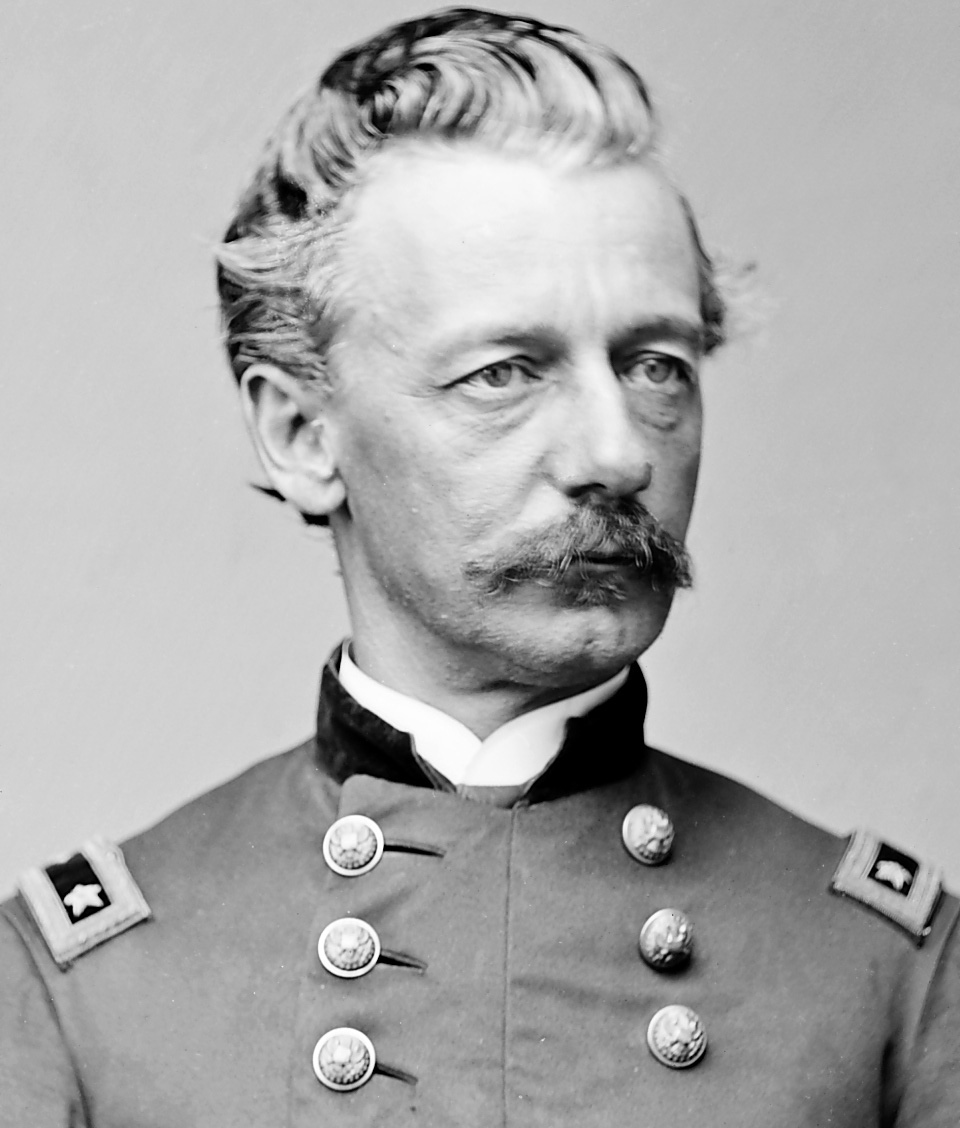
Henry Slocum

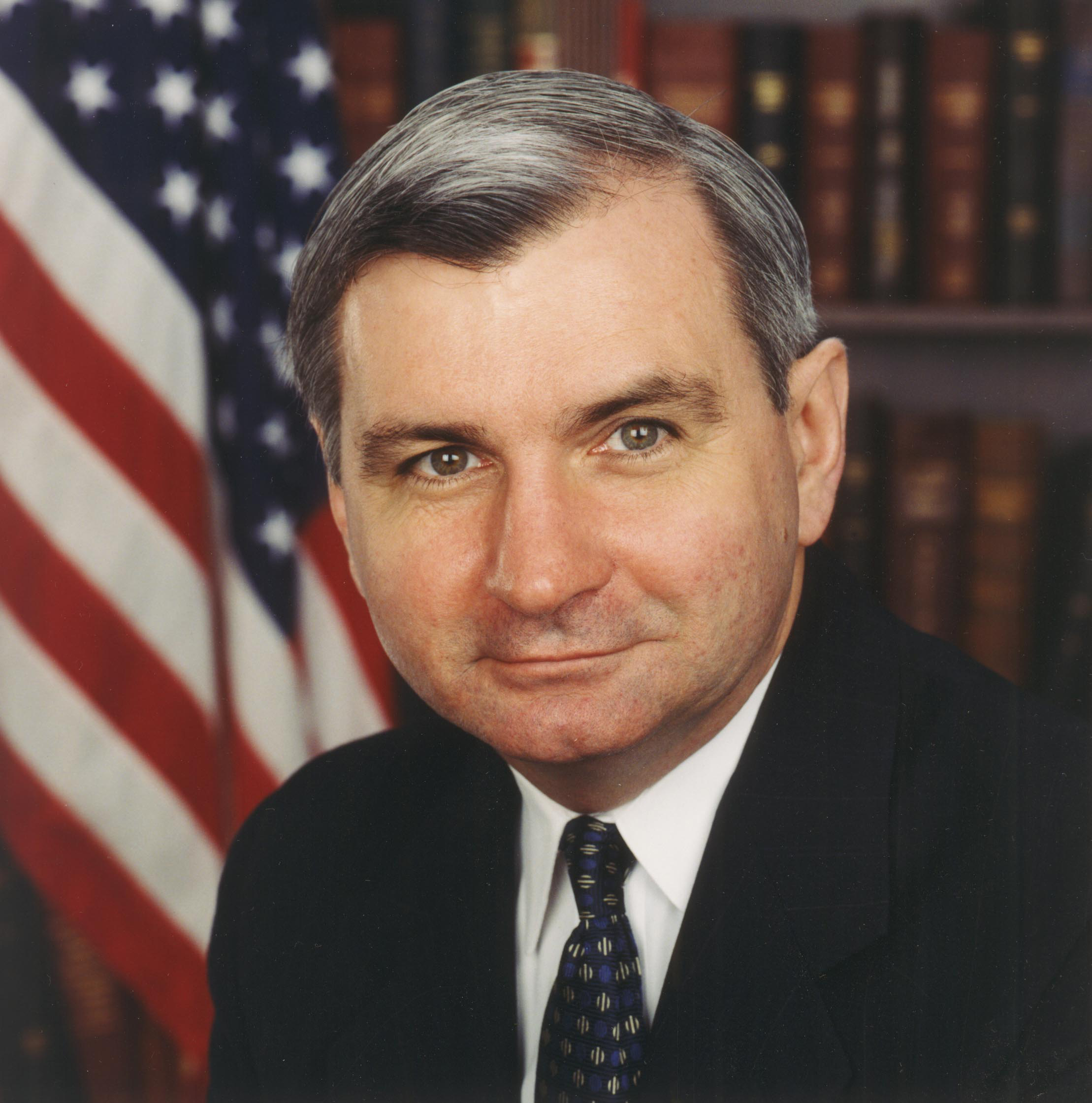
Jack Reed

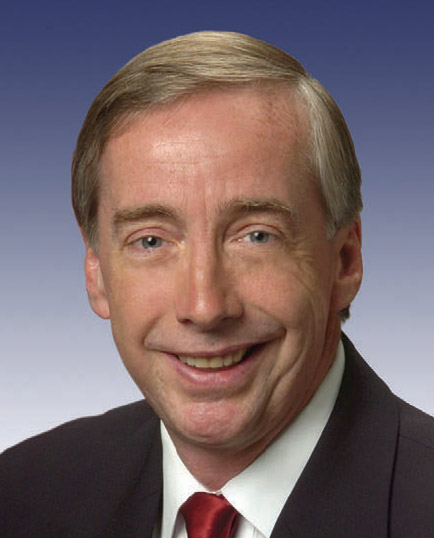
Geoff Davis

- Daniel Azro Ashley Buck, class of 1808, U.S. Representative (1823–1825, 1827–1829), Vermont
- Daniel Tunern, class of 1814, U.S. Representative, North Carolina (1827–1829)
- James Monroe, class of 1815, U.S. Representative (1839–1841), New York
- George Wurtz Hughes, class of 1827, U.S. Representative (1859–1861), Maryland
- Jefferson Davis, class of 1828, U.S. Representative (1845–1846) and Senator (1847–1853, elected but not seated 1875), Mississippi
- Joseph E. Johnston, class of 1829, U.S. Representative, Virginia
- Henry Bell Van Rensselaer, class of 1831, U.S. Representative, New York
- Robert Milligan McLane, class of 1837, U.S. Representative, Maryland
- John B. S. Todd, class of 1837, U.S. Congressman, Dakota Territory (1861–1863, 1864–1865)
- James Madison Leach, class of 1838, U.S. Representative, North Carolina
- Isaac Ingalls Stevens, class of 1839, U.S. Representative, Washington Territory
- Egbert Ludoricus Viele, class of 1847, U.S. Representative, New York
- Ambrose Burnside, class of 1847, U.S. Senator, Rhode Island (1875–1881)
- Henry Warner Slocum, class of 1852, U.S. Representative, New York (1869–1873, 1883–1884)
- Henry A. du Pont, class of 1861, U.S. Senator, Delaware (1895–1896, 1906–1917)
- Joseph Wheeler, class of 1859, U.S. Representative, Alabama (1881–1882, 1883, 1885–1900)
- Frank Obadiah Briggs, class of 1872, U.S. Senator, New Jersey
- Jesse Matlack Baker, class of 1873, Pennsylvania State Representative (1889-1892) and State Senator (1893-1897)
- Lawrence D. Tyson, class of 1883, U.S. Senator, Tennessee (1925–1929)
- Bertram Tracy Clayton, class of 1886, U.S. Representative, New York (1899–1901)
- Charles Henry Martin, class of 1887, U.S. Representative, Oregon
- Butler Ames, class of 1894, U.S. Representative, Massachusetts
- Frank Kowalski, class of 1930, U.S. Representative from Connecticut
- Nile Soik, class of 1945, member of the Wisconsin State Legislature
- Howard Hollis Callaway, class of 1949, U.S. Representative, Georgia (1965-1967)
- John Michael Murphy, class of 1950, U.S. Representative, New York (1963-1981)
- Adam Benjamin Jr., class of 1958, U.S. Representative, Indiana (1977–82)
- Jack Reed, class of 1971, U.S. Representative (1991–1997), U.S. Senator (1997- ), Rhode Island
- Keith Self, class of 1975, U.S. Representative, Texas (2023– )
- John Shimkus, class of 1980, U.S. Representative, Illinois (1997– 2021)
- Geoff Davis, class of 1981, U.S. Representative, Kentucky (2004– 2012)
- Mike Pompeo, class of 1986, U.S. Representative, Kansas (2011–2017)
- Mark Green, class of 1986, U.S. Representative, Tennessee (2019–2025)
- Brett Guthrie, class of 1987, U.S. Representative, Kentucky (2009– )
- Warren Davidson, class of 1995, U.S. Representative, Ohio (2016– )
- Steve Watkins, class of 1999, U.S. Representative, Kansas (2019–2021)
- Pat Ryan, class of 2004, U.S. Representative, New York (2022– )
- John James, class of 2004, U.S. Representative, Michigan (2023–)
- Wesley Hunt, class of 2004, U.S. Representative, Texas (2023– )
- Matt Van Epps, class of 2005, U.S. Representative, Tennessee (2025– )
- Pat Harrigan, class of 2009, U.S. Representative, North Carolina (2025– )

=== Mayors ===
| Name / Class year / Notability / References; Luis R. Esteves / 1915 / Major General; second Hispanic graduate of the Academy; Pancho Villa Expedition; mayor and judge of Polvo, Mexico; commander of the 23rd Battalion, which was composed of Puerto Ricans and stationed in Panama during World War I; commander of 92nd Infantry Brigade Combat Team during World War II; founder of the Puerto Rico National Guard |

- William Lewis Cabell, class of 1850, Mayor of Dallas, Texas (1874–76, 1877–79, 1883–85)
- Frank Fischl, class of 1951, Mayor of Allentown, Pennsylvania (1978–1982)
- Robert M. Isaac, class of 1951, Mayor of Colorado Springs, Colorado (1979–1997)
- Matthew Collier, class of 1979, Mayor of Flint, Michigan (1988–1992)
- Maria Vedder Lowe, class of 1998, Mayor of St. Pete Beach, Florida (2014–2016)
- Adrian Perkins, class of 2008, Mayor of Shreveport, Louisiana (2018–2022)

=== Jurists ===
- John Archibald Campbell, ex-class of 1830, Associate Justice of the Supreme Court of the United States (1853-1861)
- Montgomery Blair, class of 1835, attorney for Dred Scott in landmark 1857 Supreme Court case Dred Scott v. Sandford, 20th United States Postmaster General (1861–1864)
- Francis Redding Tillou Nicholls, class of 1855, Chief Justice Louisiana Supreme Court (1892–1911)
- Richard W. Young, class of 1882, Philippines Supreme Court Justice (1899–1901)
- Richard D. Cudahy, class of 1948, Judge on the United States Court of Appeals for the Seventh Circuit (1979-2015)
- Malcolm Jones Howard, class of 1962, Judge, United States District Court Eastern District of North Carolina (1987–2005)
- Mike Bowers, class of 1963, Georgia's longest-serving Attorney General (1981–1997)
- Eugene R. Sullivan, class of 1964, Chief Judge United States Court of Appeals for the Armed Forces (1986–2002)
- Rhesa Barksdale, class of 1966, U.S. Court of Appeals for the Fifth Circuit (1990–2009)
- Roy Moore, class of 1969, Chief Justice Alabama Supreme Court (2001–2003, 2013–2017)
- Bruce E. Kasold, class of 1973, Judge on the United States Court of Appeals for Veterans Claims (2003-2016)

== Law enforcement and intelligence figures ==
- Fitz John Porter, class of 1845, New York City Police Commissioner
- William Farrar Smith, class of 1845, New York City Police Commissioner
- Frederick Dent Grant, class of 1871, New York City Police Commissioner
- Dario Lorenzetti, class of 1993, CIA Officer killed in Afghanistan
- Douglas Imrie McKay, class of 1905, New York City Police Commissioner
- Norman Schwarzkopf Sr., class of 1917, first superintendent of the New Jersey State Police
- Alva R. Fitch, class of 1930
- Barry McCaffrey class of 1964, Drug Czar during Clinton Administration
- Donald B. Smith class of 1969, New York State Sheriff Association President, Putnam County Sheriff 2002–2018
- Keith B. Alexander class of 1974, Head of the National Security Agency, General – Commander of Cyber Command
- Lon Horiuchi, class of 1976
- Scott Curtis, class of 1990, FBI special agent

== Literary figures and actors ==
| Name / Class year / Notability / References; John Gregory Bourke / 1869 / Captain at time of retirement, Private at the time of the Medal of Honor action; recipient of the Medal of Honor for gallantry in action at the Battle of Stones River, Tennessee; prolific diarist and author focusing on the Old West |

- Henry Martyn Robert, class of 1857, author of Robert's Rules of Order
- William James Roe, class of 1867, author of satirical and metaphysical works, poet and artist
- John Wilson Ruckman, class of 1883, first editor of Journal of U.S. Artillery, author of numerous technical articles on gunnery
- Herbert H. Sargent, class of 1883, author of Napoleon Bonaparte's First Campaign, The Campaign of Marengo and The Campaign of Santiago de Cuba
- Cornelis DeWitt Willcox, class of 1885
- Col. Mark M. Boatner III, class of June 1943, author of Civil War Dictionary, Encyclopedia of the American Revolution
- Hal Moore, class of 1945, author of We Were Soldiers Once...And Young
- James Salter, class of 1945, prolific author, selected to the Academy of Arts and Letters
- Bill McWilliams, class of 1955, author of A Return To Glory
- Gus Lee, ex-class of 1966, honorary member of the class of 1970, author of China Boy, Chasing Hepburn
- Lucian Truscott IV, class of 1969, journalist and author of Dress Grey
- Brian Haig, class of 1975, novelist
- James Carafano, class of 1977, author of Winning the Long War
- Mark Valley, class of 1987, TV and movie actor
- Col. Gregory D. Gadson, class of 1989, movie actor
- Paula Broadwell, class of 1995, author

== Military figures ==
=== Medal of Honor recipients ===
==== Civil War ====
| Name | Class year | Notability | References |
|---|---|---|---|
| John Cleveland Robinson | 1839 ex | Left the Academy after three years but joined the Army one year later; Major General in the American Civil War; awarded the MOH for valor in action in 1864 near Spotsylvania Courthouse, Virginia; Lieutenant Governor of New York (1873–1874); served two terms as the president of the Grand Army of the Republic | |
| John Porter Hatch | 1845 | Major General; fought in the Mexican War where he was breveted twice for bravery in battle; awarded the MOH for bravery at the Battle of South Mountain during the Maryland Campaign where he was wounded and had two mounts shot from underneath him; later served on the western frontier; retired to New York City and was awarded the Medal of Honor in 1893 | |
| Orlando B. Willcox | 1847 | Major General; awarded the MOH in 1895 for gallantry at the First Battle of Bull Run where he was captured; later released as part of a prisoner exchange and served in the Virginia and North Carolina theaters at the end of the war | |
| Absalom Baird | 1849 | Major General; attended Washington & Jefferson College before graduating from West Point; earned fame for actions at the Chickamauga, Chattanooga, and Jonesborough; received the MOH in 1896 for his actions at Jonesborough; later received the French Légion d'honneur | |
| Rufus Saxton | 1849 | Brigadier General; recipient of the MOH for his defense at the Battle of Harpers Ferry; participated in the Pacific Railroad surveys in 1853; early abolitionist | |
| Eugene Asa Carr | 1850 | Major General; recipient of the MOH for his defensive though wounded several times at the Battle of Pea Ridge | |
| Charles Henry Tompkins | 1851 ex | Dropped out of the Academy after two years for unspecified reasons; Brigadier General; recipient of the MOH for twice charging through the enemy's lines on 1 July 1861 near Fairfax, Virginia, making him the first Union officer of the Civil War to receive the Medal of Honor | |
| David S. Stanley | 1852 | Major General; recipient of the MOH for his actions organizing a counterattack at the Second Battle of Franklin, commander of the IV Corps | |
| John Schofield | 1853 | Lieutenant General; recipient of the Medal of Honor for his actions leading an attack at the Battle of Wilson's Creek, Atlanta campaign, Battle of Franklin, Battle of Nashville, Battle of Wyse Fork; commander of the Army of the Frontier, division commander in the XIV Corps; United States Secretary of War (1868–1869); Superintendent of the Academy (1876–1881); Commanding General of the United States Army (1888–1895); Military Governor of Virginia | |
| Oliver Duff Greene | 1853 | Major; recipient of the MOH for his actions at the Battle of Antietam | |
| Zenas Bliss | 1854 | Major General; recipient of the MOH for his actions at the Battle of Fredericksburg; formed the first unit of Seminole-Negro Indian Scouts | |
| Oliver Otis Howard | 1854 | Major General; recipient of the MOH for his actions leading an attack at the Battle of Seven Pines despite wound which resulted in the loss of his right arm; led the campaign against Chief Joseph and the Nez Perce tribe; founder of Howard University; Superintendent of the Academy (1881–1882) | |
| Alexander S. Webb | 1855 | Major General; recipient of the MOH for his actions at the Battle of Gettysburg for personal bravery and leadership repulsing Pickett's Charge; president of the City College of New York (1869–1902) | |
| Abraham Arnold | 1859 | Brigadier General; recipient of the MOH for leading a cavalry charge against superior forces | |
| Horace Porter | 1860 | Brigadier General; recipient of the MOH for his actions at the Battle of Chickamauga; United States Ambassador to France (1897–1905) | |
| John Moulder Wilson | 1860 | Brigadier General; recipient of the MOH for his actions at the Battle of Malvern Hill despite acute illness; Superintendent of the Academy (1889–1893); Chief of Engineers (1897–1901) | |
| Adelbert Ames | 1861 (May) | Major General; recipient of the MOH for his continuing a fierce fight though severely wounded in his right thigh at First Battle of Bull Run; Governor of Mississippi (1868–1870) and (1874–1876); United States Senator from Mississippi (1870–1874) | |
| Eugene B. Beaumont | 1861 (May) | Lieutenant Colonel; recipient of the MOH for two separate actions at the Harpeth River in Tennessee and the Battle of Selma in Alabama | |
| Samuel Nicholl Benjamin | 1861 (May) | Major; recipient of the MOH for actions as an artillery officer | |
| Henry A. du Pont | 1861 (May) | Lieutenant Colonel; recipient of the MOH for actions repulsing an enemy attack at the Battle of Cedar Creek; United States Senator from Delaware (1906–1917) | |
| Guy Vernor Henry | 1861 (May) | Brigadier General; recipient of the MOH for actions repulsing an enemy attack at the Battle of Cold Harbor; son Major General Guy Vernor Henry Jr. is an Academy alumnus, class of 1894; Governor of Puerto Rico (1898–1899) | |
| Alonzo Cushing | 1861 (June) | First Lieutenant; posthumous recipient of the MOH for actions at Cemetery Ridge during the Battle of Gettysburg; his medal was not awarded until over 150 years after his death | |
| George Lewis Gillespie Jr. | 1862 | Brigadier General; recipient of the MOH for carrying dispatches under withering fire at the Battle of Cold Harbor; Chief of Engineers (1901–1904) | |
| William Sully Beebe | 1863 | Major; recipient of the MOH for actions during an assault on a fortified position | |
| William Henry Harrison Benyaurd | 1863 | Lieutenant Colonel; recipient of the MOH for actions during reconnaissance and rallying his troops | |
| John Gregory Bourke | 1869 | Captain at time of retirement, Private at the time of the Medal of Honor action; recipient of the MOH for gallantry in action at the Battle of Stones River, Tennessee; prolific diarist and author focusing on the Old West | |

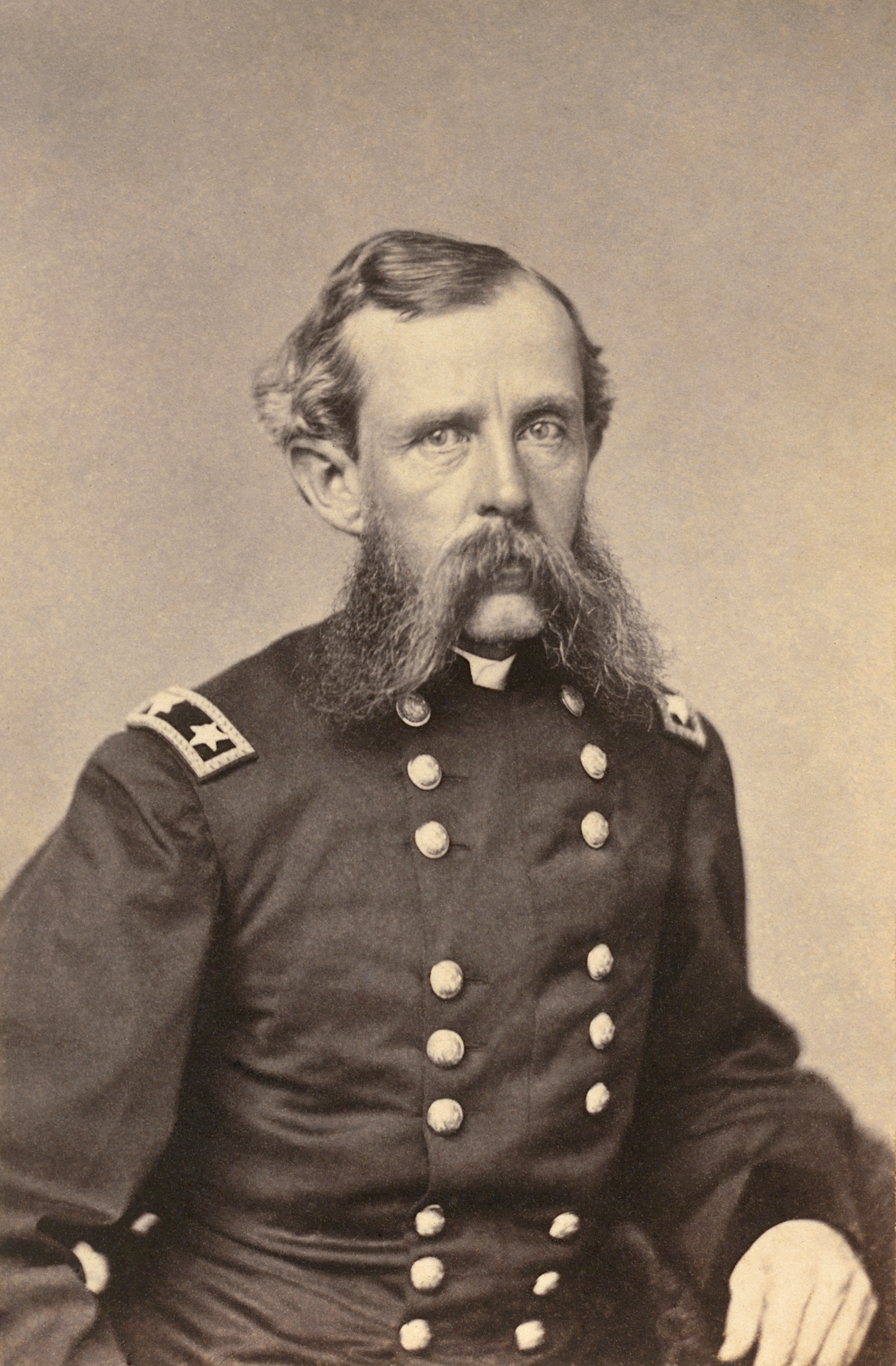
Absalom Baird

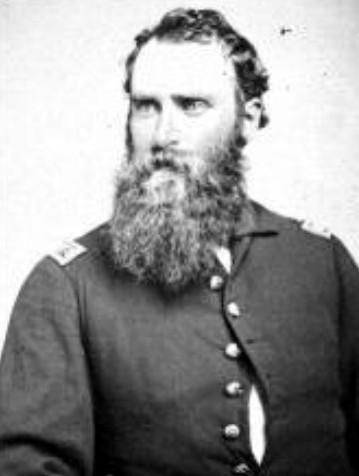
Charles Henry Tompkins

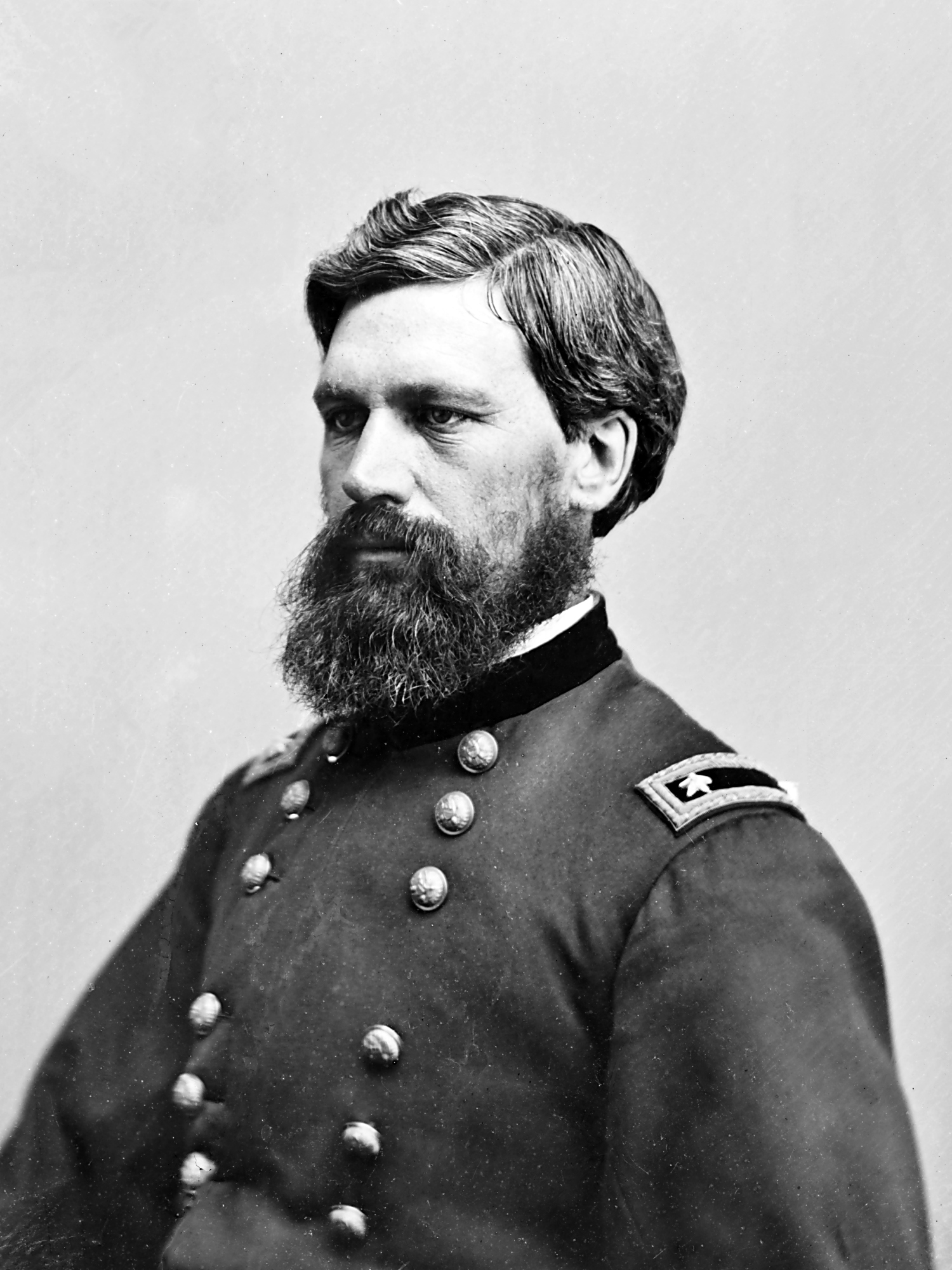
Oliver Howard

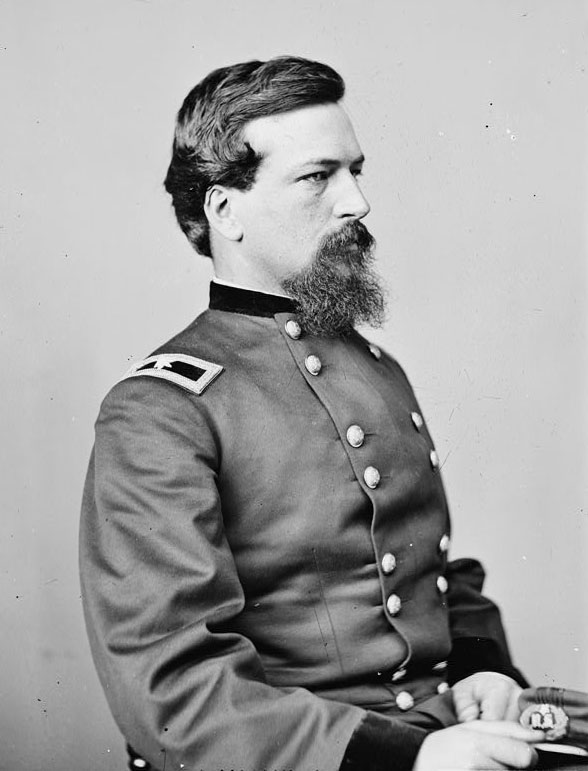
Alexander Webb

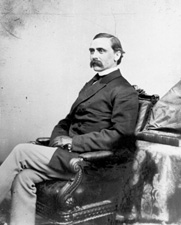
Adelbert Ames

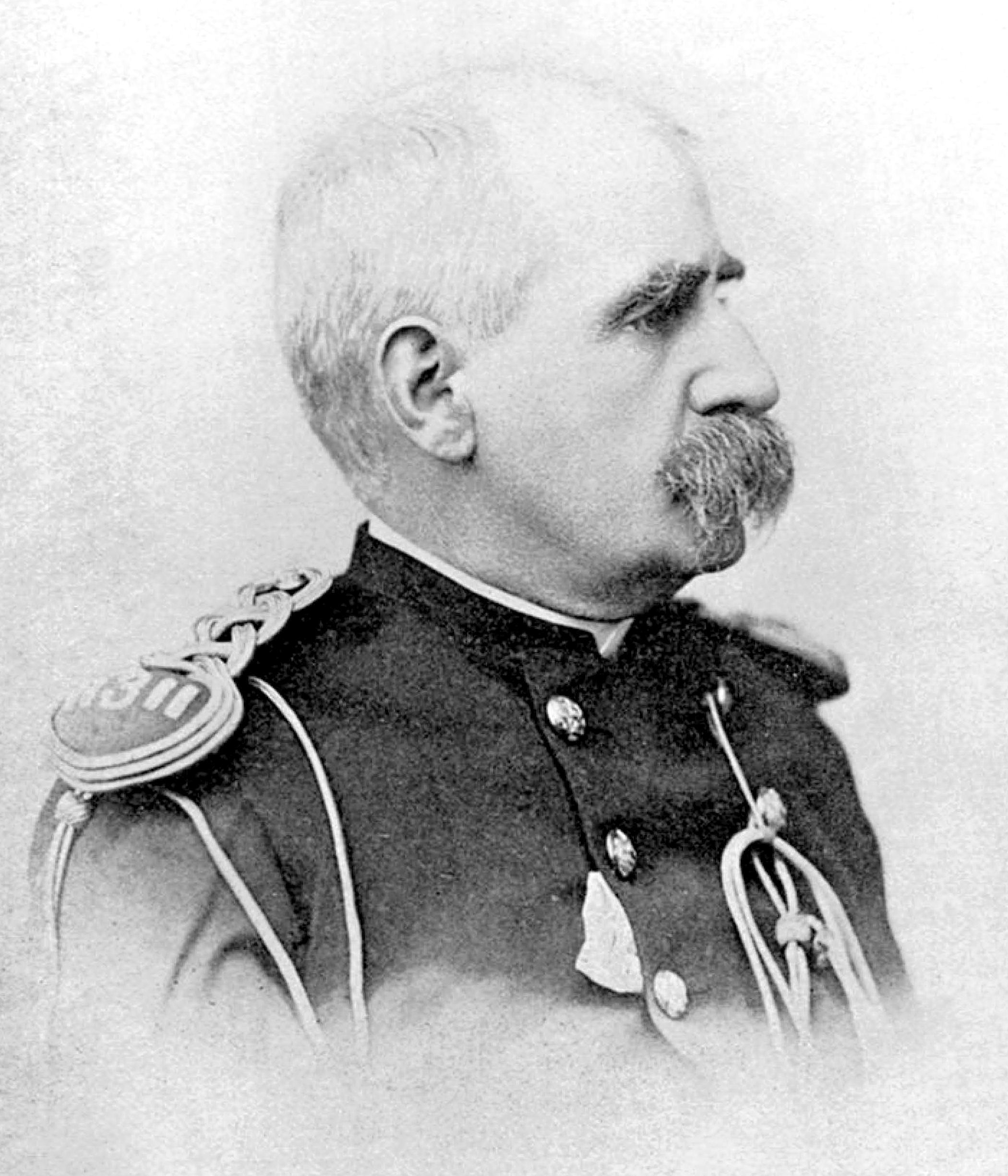
John Bourke

==== Indian Wars ====
| Name | Class year | Notability | References |
|---|---|---|---|
| Edward Settle Godfrey | 1867 | Brigadier General; a Private during the Civil War before attending West Point; received the MOH for leading his men against Chief Joseph despite being severely wounded; led two platoons of Medal of Honor men at the burial of the Unknown Soldier from World War I | |
| William Preble Hall | 1868 | Brigadier General; received the MOH for leading a small group to rescue an officer surrounded by 35 enemy; distinguished marksman with rifle and revolver | |
| Charles Francis Roe | 1868 | served as a United States Army officer during the Indian Wars. Commanded the New York National Guard from 1898 to 1912 | |
| Robert Goldthwaite Carter | 1870 | First Lieutenant; an enlisted soldier during the Civil War before attending West Point; received the MOH for repulsing the charge of a large hostile Indian force near the Brazos River in 1871 | |
| John Brown Kerr | 1870 | Brigadier General; received the MOH for actions against Brule Sioux along the White River, South Dakota | |
| Edward John McClernand | 1870 | Brigadier General; received the MOH for actions at Bear Paw Mountain, Montana in 1877 against Chief Joseph's tribe | |
| Charles Varnum | 1872 | Colonel; commander of the scouts for George Armstrong Custer in the Little Bighorn Campaign during the Black Hills War; recipient of the MOH for his actions in a conflict following the Battle of Wounded Knee | |
| Frank West | 1872 | Colonel; recipient of the MOH for rallying his men against a fortified position at the Battle of Big Dry Wash, Arizona, for which three other men also received the Medal of Honor: Thomas Cruse, George H. Morgan, and Charles Taylor | |
| William Harding Carter | 1873 | Major General; recipient of the MOH for rescuing two soldiers under heavy fire during the Comanche Campaign | |
| Marion Perry Maus | 1874 | Brigadier General; recipient of the MOH for actions while commander of Apache scouts in the capture of Geronimo | |
| Ernest Albert Garlington | 1876 | Brigadier General; recipient of the MOH for gallantry at the Battle of Wounded Knee | |
| John Chowning Gresham | 1876 | Colonel; recipient of the MOH for gallantry at the Battle of Wounded Knee | |
| Oscar Fitzalan Long | 1876 | Brigadier General; recipient of the MOH for leadership under heavy fire at Bear Paw Mountain, Montana | |
| Matthias W. Day | 1877 | Colonel; recipient of the MOH for rescuing a wounded soldier under heavy fire after being ordered to retreat; member of the 9th Cavalry Regiment of the Buffalo Soldiers | |
| Robert Temple Emmet | 1877 | Colonel; recipient of the MOH for holding off 200 enemies with only himself and five men despite being surrounded; member of the 9th Cavalry Regiment of the Buffalo Soldiers | |
| Wilber Elliott Wilder | 1877 | Brigadier General; recipient of the MOH for rescuing a wounded soldier under heavy fire; key figure in negotiating the surrender of the Apache chief Geronimo | |
| Lloyd Milton Brett | 1879 | Brigadier General; recipient of the MOH for fearless exposure in cutting off the enemy's pony herd at O'Fallon's Creek, Montana, which greatly crippled their ability to fight | |
| Thomas Cruse | 1879 | Brigadier General; recipient of the MOH for holding off the enemy, which enabled the rescue of wounded soldier at the Battle of Big Dry Wash, Arizona, for which three other men also received the Medal of Honor: Frank West, George H. Morgan, and Charles Taylor | |
| George Ritter Burnett | 1880 | First Lieutenant; recipient of the MOH for rescuing stranded men under heavy enemy fire; one of his men, Augustus Walley, also received the Medal of Honor for this action, both members of the 9th Cavalry Regiment of the Buffalo Soldiers | |
| George Horace Morgan | 1880 | Colonel; recipient of the MOH for steadfastly holding his line against the enemy at the Battle of Big Dry Wash, Arizona, for which three other men also received the Medal of Honor: Thomas Cruse, Frank West, and Charles Taylor | |
| Powhatan Henry Clarke | 1884 | First Lieutenant; recipient of the MOH for saving a wounded man under heavy fire; later drowned while rescuing another man | |
| Robert Lee Howze | 1888 | Major General; recipient of the MOH for bravery in action; once threatened to dismiss an entire class of plebes (freshmen) from the Academy for hazing; presided over the court-martial of Brigadier General Billy Mitchell | |

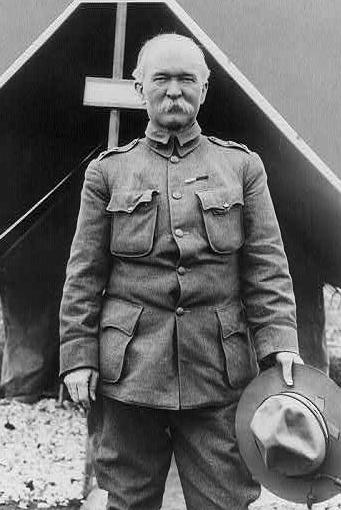
William Carter

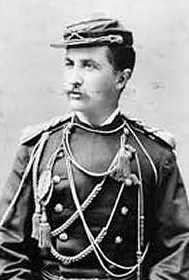
Oscar Long

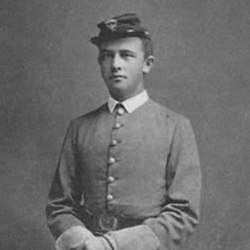
Matthias Day

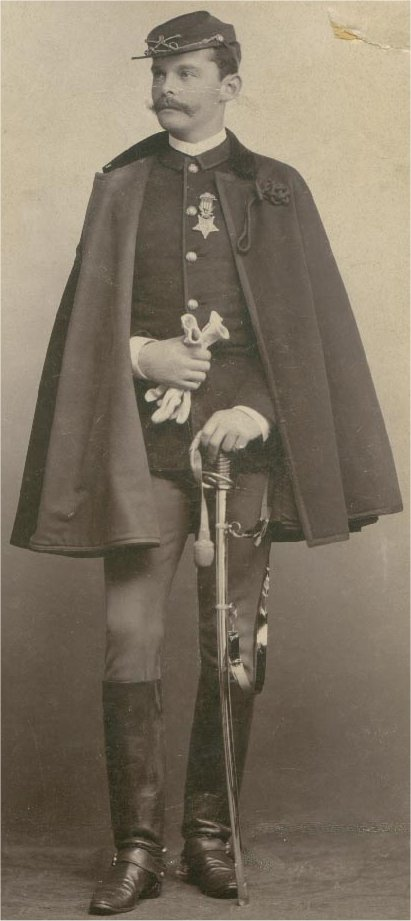
Powhatan Clarke wearing his Medal of Honor

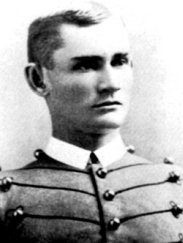
Robert Howze

==== Spanish–American War ====
| Name | Class year | Notability | References |
|---|---|---|---|
| Albert Leopold Mills | 1879 | Major General; recipient of the MOH for continuing to lead his men at the Battle of San Juan Hill despite being shot in the head and temporarily blinded; Superintendent of the Academy (1898–1906) | |
| John W. Heard | 1883 | Brigadier General; recipient of the MOH for repulsing an attack by a larger force while his unit was unloading supplies from a river boat | |
| Irving Hale | 1884 | Brigadier General; highest grade point average ever from Academy; co-founder of the VFW | |
| Charles DuVal Roberts | 1897 | Brigadier General; recipient of the MOH for assisting a wounded man under heavy fire | |
| Ira C. Welborn | 1898 | Colonel; recipient of the MOH for assisting a wounded man under heavy fire | |

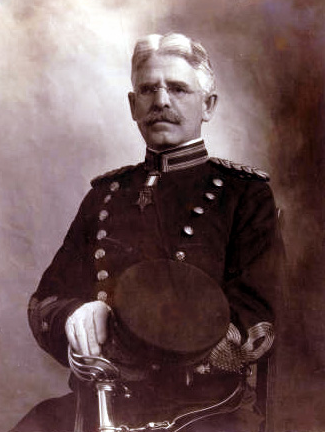
Albert Mills

==== Philippine–American War ====
| Name | Class year | Notability | References |
|---|---|---|---|
| William Edward Birkhimer | 1870 | Brigadier General; awarded the MOH for taking control of a bridge by charging and routing 300 of the enemy with 12 men | |
| James Parker | 1876 | Major General; awarded the MOH for leadership of his men by repulsing a nighttime attack by a much larger enemy force | |
| James Franklin Bell | 1878 | Major General; began his career with the 9th Cavalry Regiment, a black unit; awarded the MOH for attacking seven enemy soldiers alone | |
| John Alexander Logan Jr. | 1887 ex | Major; awarded the MOH for actions while leading his small unit in an attack against a much larger enemy force | |
| Hugh J. McGrath | 1880 | Captain; awarded the MOH for actions against the enemy at a cave | |
| William Hampden Sage | 1882 | Captain; awarded the MOH for swimming the San Juan River in the face of the enemy's fire and drove him from his entrenchment | |
| Louis Joseph Van Schaick | 1900 ex | Colonel; awarded the MOH for cavalry actions against hostile forces in a canyon | |
| Arthur Harrison Wilson | 1904 | Colonel; awarded the MOH for actions against hostile Moros | |
| John Thomas Kennedy | 1908 | Brigadier General; awarded the MOH for actions against the enemy at a cave | |

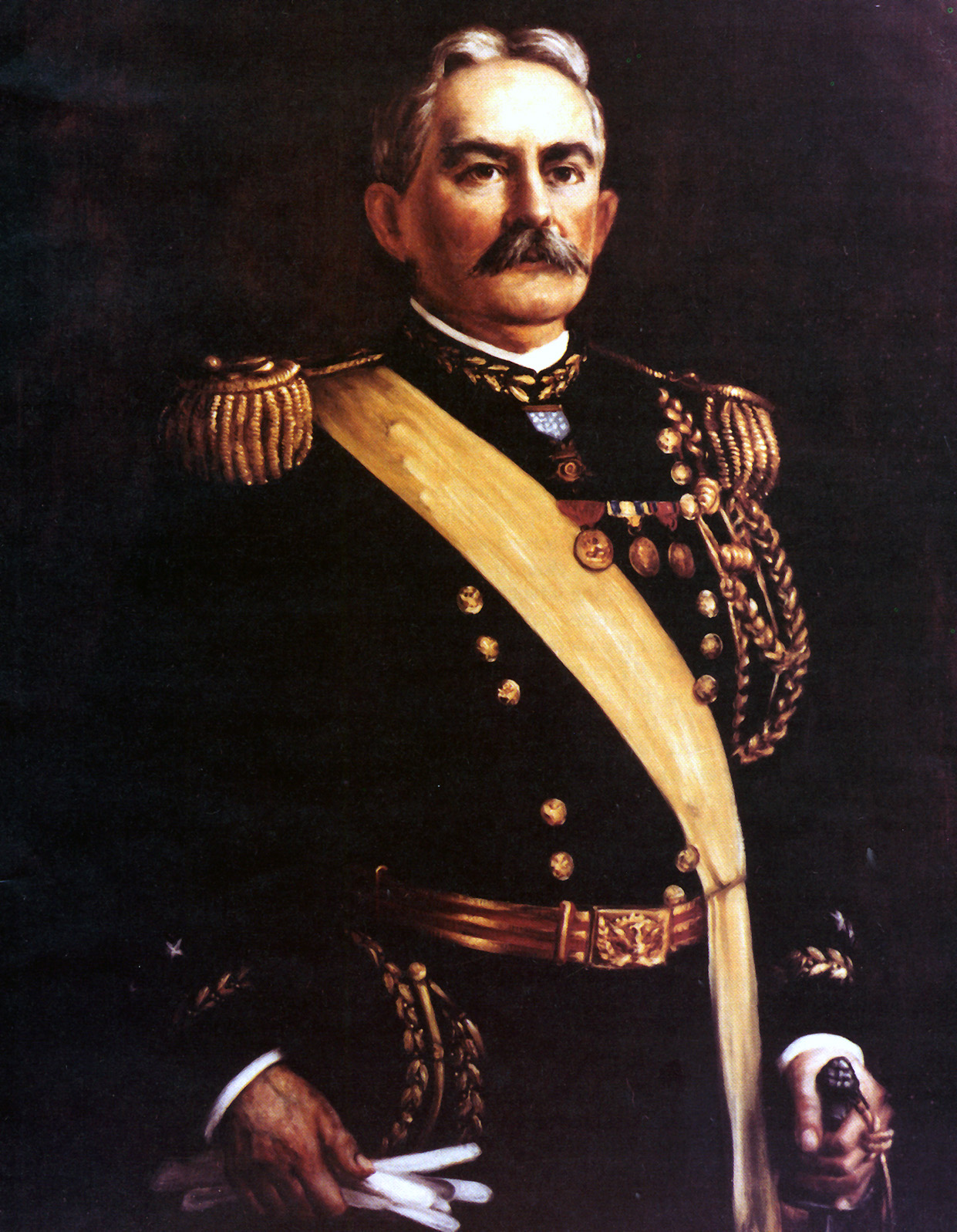
James Franklin Bell

==== Boxer Rebellion ====
| Name | Class year | Notability | References |
|---|---|---|---|
| Louis Bowem Lawton | 1893 | Major; recipient of the MOH for actions in combat despite being wounded three times | |
| Calvin Pearl Titus | 1905 | Lieutenant colonel at time of retirement, corporal at the time of the Medal of Honor action; admitted to the Academy because of his Medal of Honor during the Boxer Rebellion; became a Chaplain's assistant | |

==== Mexican Campaign (Veracruz) ====
| Name | Class year | Notability | References |
|---|---|---|---|
| Eli Thompson Fryer | 1901 ex | Brigadier General; recipient of the MOH for actions as a Marine company commander during the occupation of Veracruz | |

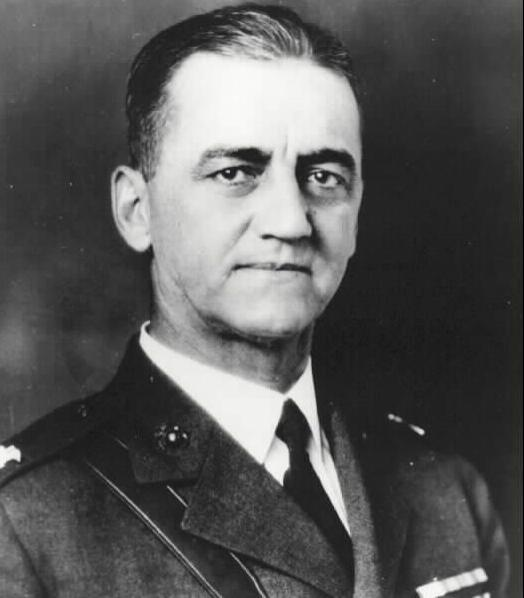
Eli T. Fryer

==== World War I ====
| Name / Class year / Notability / References; Emory Jenison Pike / 1901 / Lieutenant Colonel; recipient of the MOH for actions in combat organizing and leading units during heavy shelling despite being mortally wounded |

==== World War II ====
| Name | Class year | Notability | References |
|---|---|---|---|
| Douglas MacArthur | 1903 | General of the Army, Field Marshal in the Philippine Army; United States occupation of Veracruz; Second Battle of the Marne, Battle of Saint-Mihiel, Meuse-Argonne Offensive during World War I; commander of the 42nd Infantry Division; Superintendent of the United States Military Academy (1919–1922); brigade commander in the Philippine Division; commander of the Philippine Department; Chief of Staff of the United States Army (1930–1935); recipient of the Medal of Honor for actions during the Battle of Bataan, commander of the South West Pacific Area during World War II; Supreme Commander of the Allied Powers during the Occupation of Japan; Korean War; grandson of Wisconsin Governor Arthur MacArthur Sr.; son of lieutenant general and Medal of Honor recipient Arthur MacArthur Jr. | |
| Jonathan Mayhew Wainwright IV | 1906 | General; recipient of the MOH for defense of te Bataan and Corregidor; also noted for leadership while a prisoner of war (POW); present on board USS Missouri (BB-63) for the surrender of Japan; returned to the Philippines to accept surrender of the local Japanese commander; his father, Robert Powell Page Wainwright, was member of the Academy class of 1875 | |
| William H. Wilbur | 1912 | Brigadier General; recipient of the MOH for actions during the Allied landings in North Africa while attempting to negotiate a cease fire and leading combat actions against hostile forces | |
| Demas T. Craw | 1924 | Colonel, United States Army Air Forces; posthumous recipient of the MOH for ground actions during the Allied landings in North Africa while attempting to negotiate a cease fire | |
| Leon William Johnson | 1926 | General, United States Army Air Corps and United States Air Force; recipient of the MOH for actions in aerial combat during the raid on the Ploesti, Romania oilfields | |
| Frederick Walker Castle | 1930 | Brigadier General, United States Army Air Forces; posthumous recipient of the MOH for actions in aerial combat while leading a bombing mission over Belgium | |
| Robert G. Cole | 1939 | Lieutenant Colonel; 502nd Infantry Regiment, 101st Airborne Division; recipient of the MOH for leading his battalion in a bayonet charge at Carentan, France, during the Battle of Normandy; later killed in Best, Netherlands | |
| Leon Vance | 1939 | Lieutenant Colonel, United States Army Air Corps; recipient of the MOH for actions in saving his bomber crew though he was severely wounded; Vance Air Force Base in his hometown of Enid, Oklahoma, is named in his honor | |
| Alexander R. Nininger | 1941 | Second Lieutenant; recipient of the MOH for actions in Bataan, Philippines while a member of the Philippine Scouts, continued an attack even though wounded three times; first Army soldier awarded the Medal of Honor in World War II; First Division of Cadet Barracks at West Point is named in his honor | |
| Michael J. Daly | 1945 ex | Captain; dropped out of the Academy after one year to enlist so he could fight in World War II; received a battlefield commission; awarded the MOH for assaulting several enemy positions | |

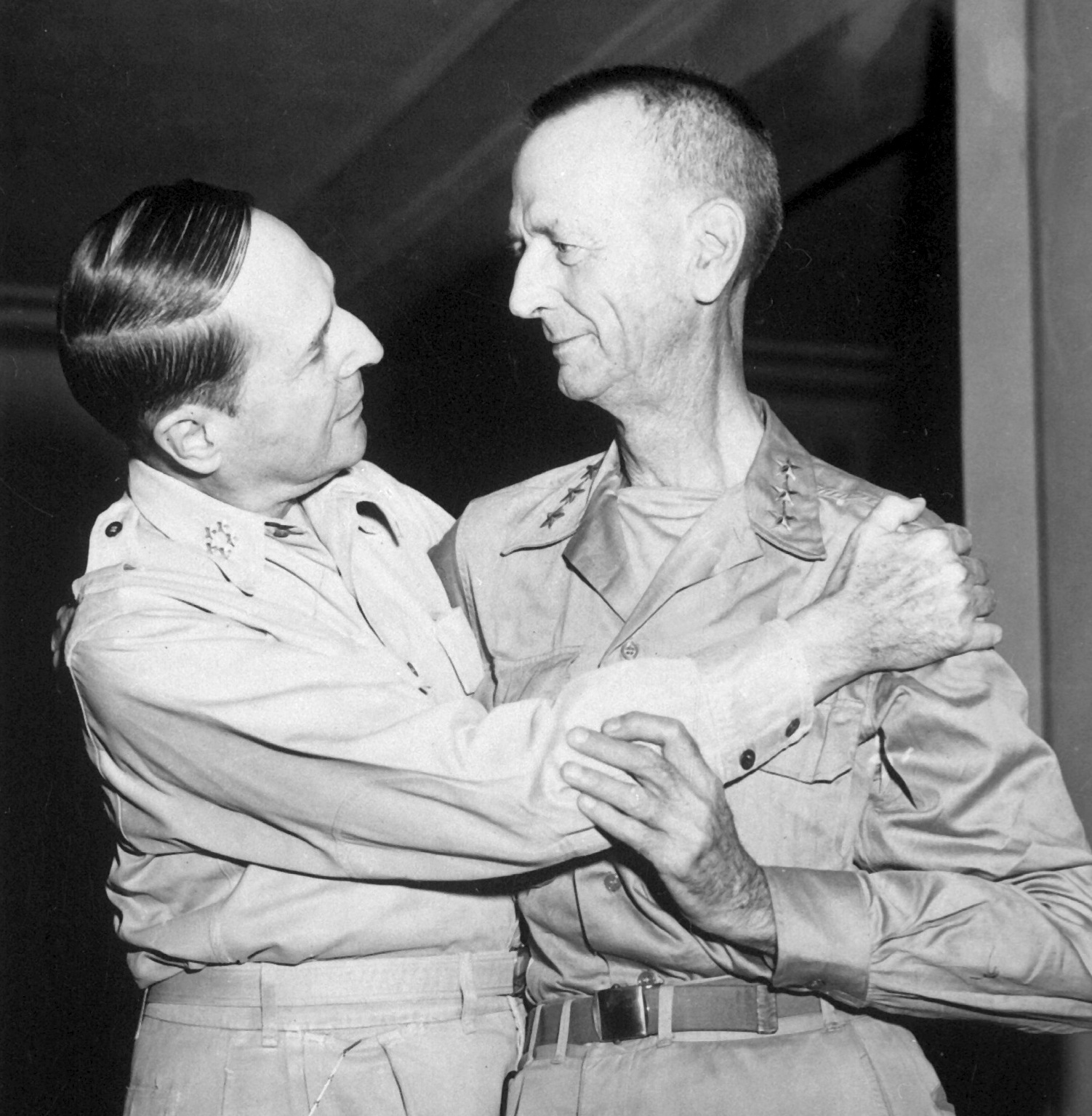
Two Medal of Honor recipients and friends, MacArthur (l) and Wainwright (r), greet at the end of the war. Wainwright was just released from POW camp

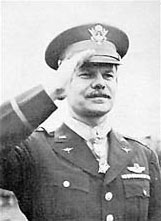
Leon Johnson, at his Medal of Honor ceremony with the medal around his neck

==== Korea ====
| Name | Class year | Notability | References |
|---|---|---|---|
| Samuel S. Coursen | 1949 | First Lieutenant; recipient of the MOH for actions while helping rescue a wounded man and eliminating an enemy roadblock | |
| Ralph Puckett | 1949 | First Lieutenant. Originally awarded the Distinguished Service Cross for his actions on November 25, 1950, when his company of 51 Rangers was attacked by several hundred Chinese soldiers at the battle for Hill 205. In April 2021, Puckett's Distinguished Service Cross for his actions on November 25, 1950, was upgraded to the Medal of Honor. He received the award from President Joe Biden during a ceremony at the White House on May 21, 2021. He is the last surviving Medal of Honor recipient of the Korean War, since the death of Hiroshi Miyamura on November 29, 2022. Retired as a Colonel. | |
| Richard Thomas Shea | 1952 | First Lieutenant; recipient of the MOH for actions while leading a counterattack against a larger enemy force | |

==== Vietnam ====
| Name | Class year | Notability | References |
|---|---|---|---|
| William A. Jones III | 1945 | Colonel, United States Air Force; recipient of the MOH for actions while helping rescue a downed pilot | |
| Andre Lucas | 1954 | Lieutenant Colonel; recipient of the MOH for repulsing a much larger force over a 23-day period | |
| Roger Donlon | 1959 ex | Dropped out of the Academy for personal reasons; Captain, later Colonel; recipient of the MOH for repulsing a much larger force | |
| Humbert Roque Versace | 1959 | Captain; recipient of the MOH for his resistance to Viet Cong indoctrination efforts while a prisoner of war (POW); his struggle was chronicled in length by fellow POW Nick Rowe in the book Five Years to Freedom | |
| James A. Gardner | 1965 ex | Did not graduate; First Lieutenant; recipient of the MOH for actions leading his platoon in the relief of a company that was engaged with a larger enemy force | |
| Frank S. Reasoner | 1962 | First Lieutenant, United States Marine Corps; recipient of the MOH for actions leading reconnaissance patrol against a larger force and trying to save a wounded man | |
| Robert F. Foley | 1963 | Captain, later Lieutenant General; recipient of the MOH for actions on 11 November 1966 for rallying his unit in the face of superior enemy numbers and personally destroying three enemy strongpoints; West Point Commandant of Cadets (1992–1994); later president of Marion Military Institute; currently the director of the Army Emergency Relief Program | |
| Paul William Bucha | 1965 | Captain; recipient of the MOH for actions leading his unit against a larger enemy for in Bình Dương Province, Vietnam; foreign policy adviser to Barack Obama's 2008 presidential campaign | |

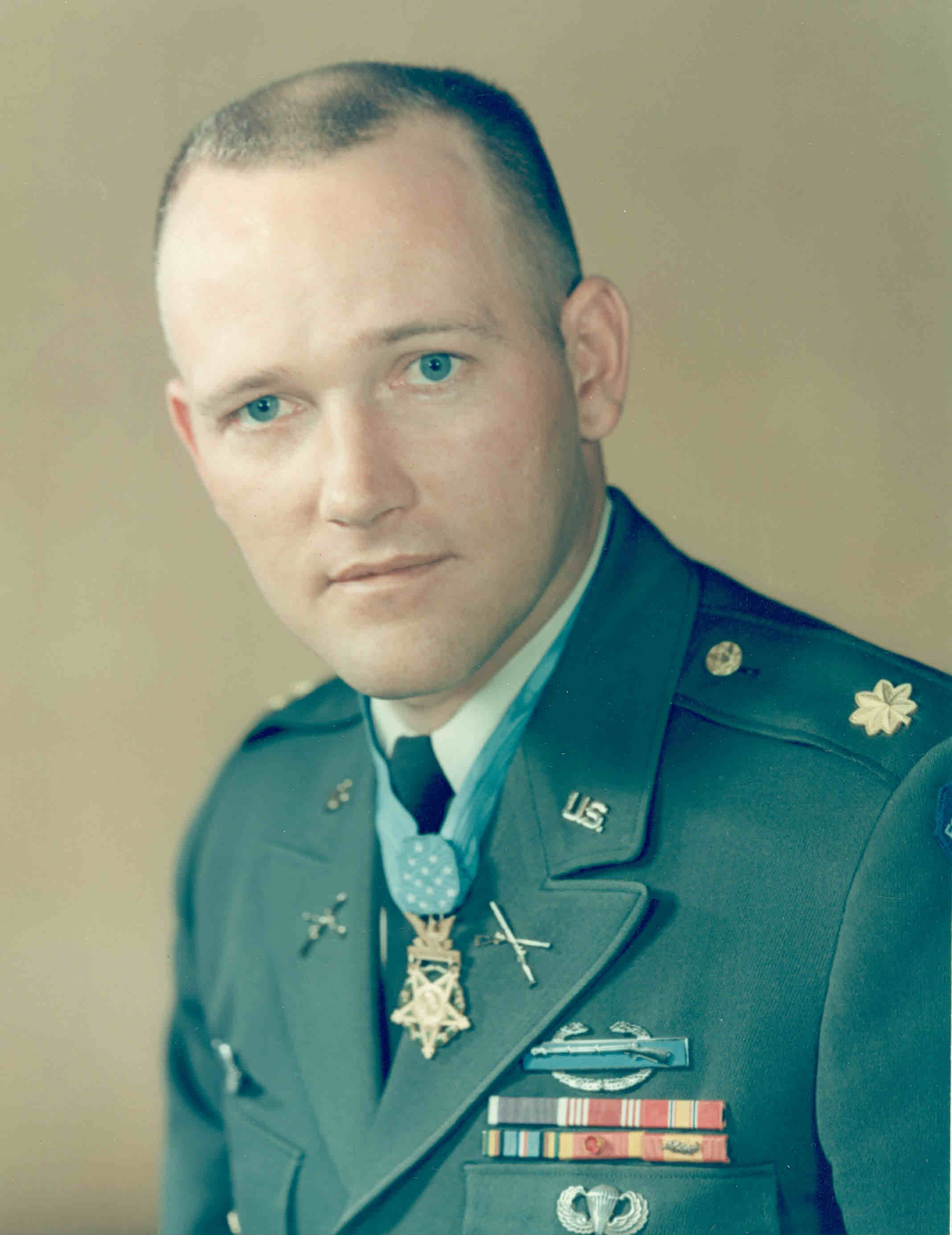
Roger Donlon

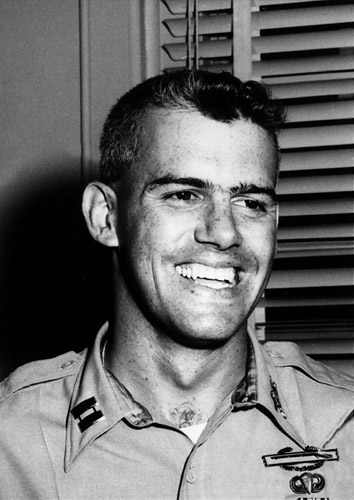
Humbert Versace

=== Mexican–American War combatants ===
| Name | Class year | Notability | References |
|---|---|---|---|
| Joseph Gilbert Totten | 1805 | Major General; War of 1812, Mexican–American War, American Civil War; military and lighthouse engineer; Chief of Engineers (1838–1864) | |
| Samuel Ringgold | 1818 | Major; Mexican–American War veteran; developed several artillery innovations- the "father of modern artillery"; first U.S. officer to fall in the Mexican–American War, perishing from wounds inflicted during the Battle of Palo Alto | |
| Joseph K. Mansfield | 1822 | Major General; Mexican–American War and American Civil War; civil engineer; mortally wounded at the Battle of Antietam | |
| Jefferson Davis | 1828 | Mexican–American War veteran; U.S. Representative from Mississippi (1845–1846); U.S. Senator from Mississippi (1847–1851); United States Secretary of War (1853–1857); president of the Confederate States of America (1861–1865) | |
| John B. Magruder | 1830 | Major USA, major general CSA, major general in Imperial Mexican Army; Second Seminole War and Mexican–American War veteran; noted for deceptive delaying tactics | |
| Charles Smith Hamilton | 1843 | Major General; Mexican–American War and American Civil War veteran; wounded in the Battle of Molino del Rey; division commander during the Battle of Yorktown | |

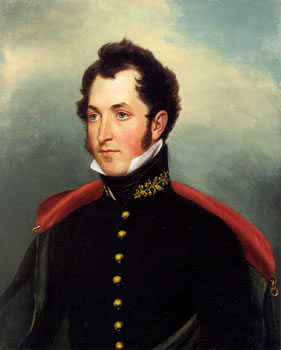
Samuel Ringgold

=== American Civil War combatants ===
==== Confederate States Army generals ====
| Name | Class year | Notability | References |
|---|---|---|---|
| Samuel Cooper | 1815 | Colonel USA, Adjutant General, 1852–1861; Adjutant and Inspector General General in the Confederate Army, 1861–1865, Highest-ranking General, CSA | |
| Albert Sidney Johnston | 1826 | Colonel USA, general in the Republic of Texas, general in the Confederate States Army; graduated eighth in his class, commander of US forces in the Utah War, killed at the Battle of Shiloh | |
| Robert E. Lee | 1829 | Colonel USA, General CSA; graduated second in his class without demerits; father of George Washington Custis Lee, class of 1854; Commander, Army of Northern Virginia (1862–1865); General-in-Chief, Confederate States Army (1865); President, Washington and Lee University (1865–1870) | |
| John B. Magruder | 1830 | Major in United States Army, major general in Confederate States Army, major general in Imperial Mexican Army; Second Seminole War and Mexican–American War veteran | |
| James Longstreet | 1842 | Major in United States Army, lieutenant general in Confederate States Army;Mexican–American War; excelled in several battles during the American Civil War, including the Second Battle of Bull Run and Battle of Antietam; severely wounded at the Battle of the Wilderness | |
| Stonewall Jackson | 1846 | Major in United States Army, lieutenant general in Confederate States Army; Mexican–American War; professor of natural and experimental philosophy and artillery at Virginia Military Institute (1851–1861); excelled in several battles during the American Civil War, including the First Battle of Bull Run where he received his nickname; accidentally shot by his own troops at the Battle of Chancellorsville and died of complications eight days later | |
| George Pickett | 1846 | Captain USA, major general in the Confederate States Army; graduated last in his class, leader of Pickett's Charge at the Battle of Gettysburg | |
| John Bell Hood | 1853 | Second Lieutenant USA, General CSA; offered a post as instructor at the Academy, but declined due to the impending war; brilliant commander in the field but less effective as a general | |
| J.E.B. Stuart | 1854 | Captain in United States Army, major general in Confederate States Army; American Indian Wars; excelled in several battles during the American Civil War, including the Peninsula Campaign and Maryland Campaign | |

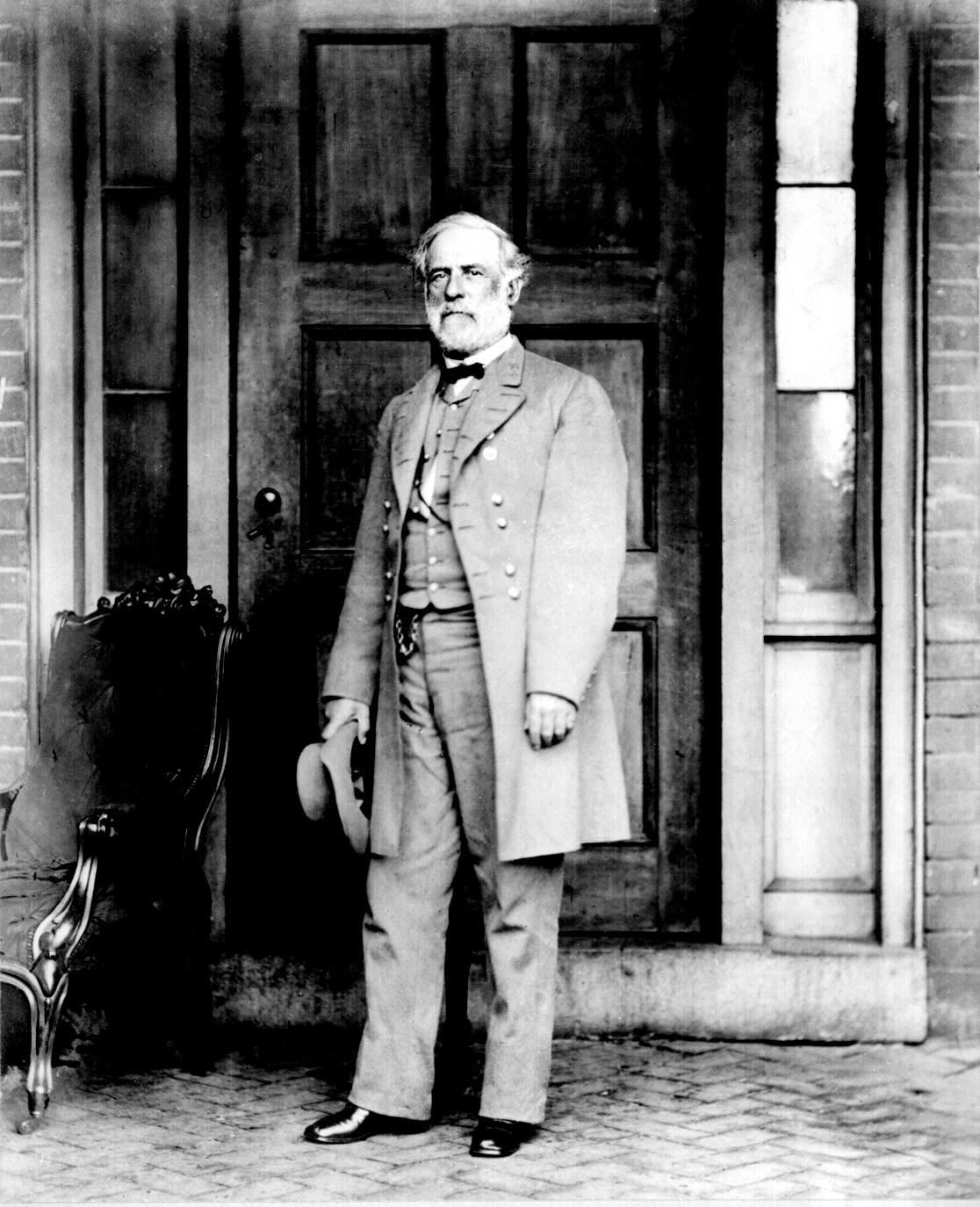
Robert E. Lee

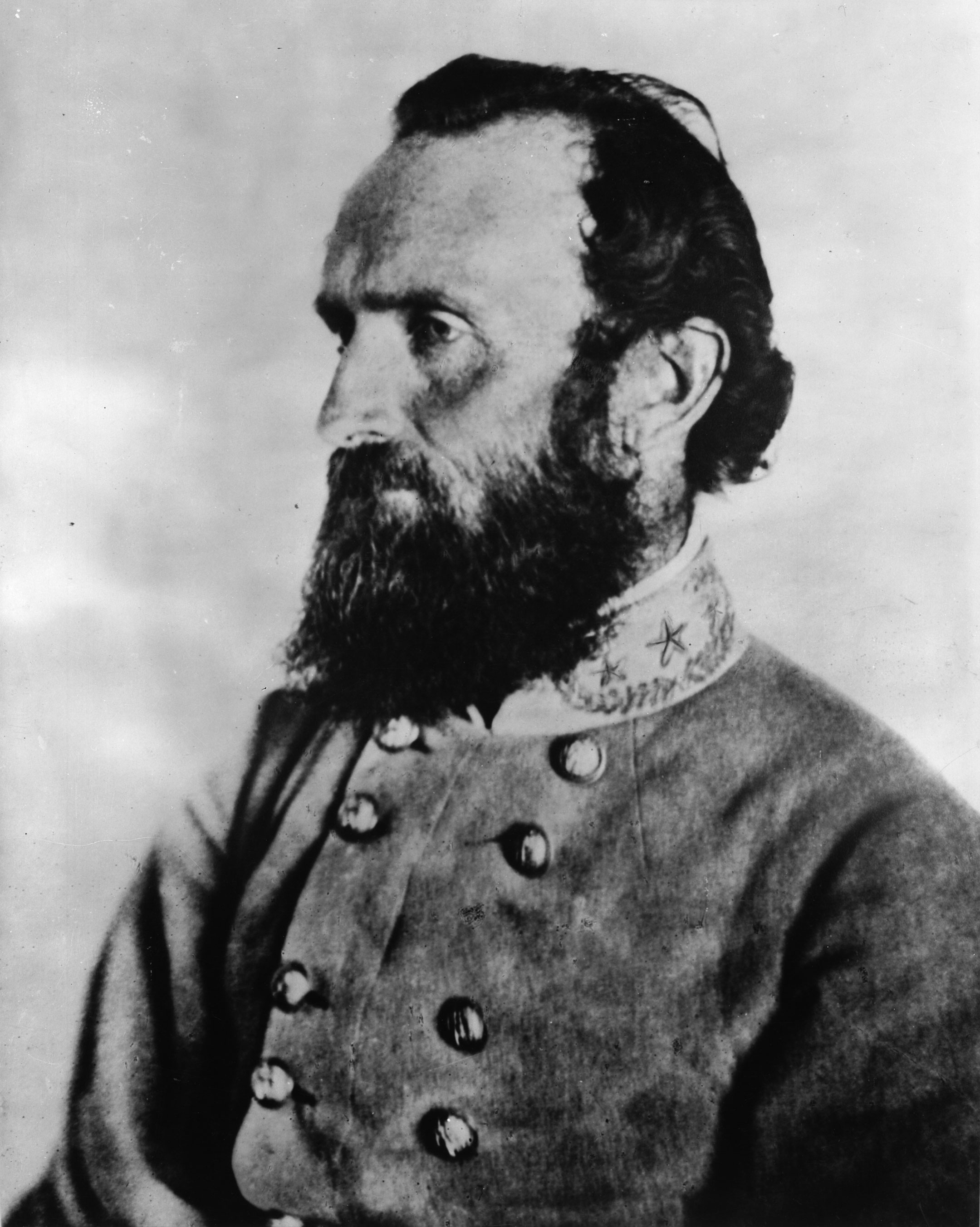
Stonewall Jackson

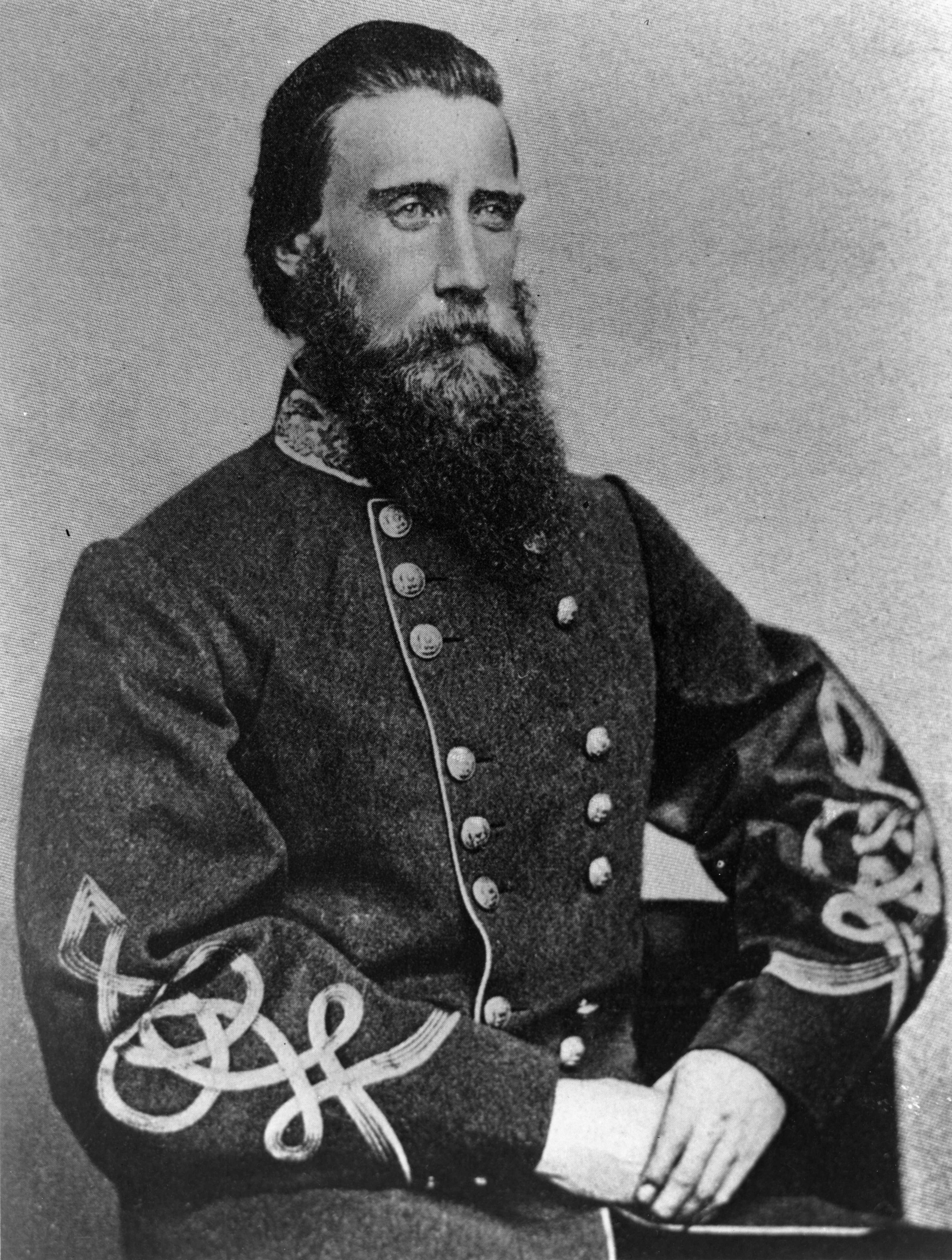
John Bell Hood

==== Union Army generals ====
| Name | Class year | Notability | References |
|---|---|---|---|
| Joseph K. Mansfield | 1822 | Major General; Mexican–American War; civil engineer; mortally wounded at the Battle of Antietam; Fort Mansfield, a coastal artillery installation in Westerly, Rhode Island named in his honor | |
| George Meade | 1835 | Major General; civil and lighthouse engineer; Second Seminole War, Mexican–American War; Battle of Antietam, Battle of Fredericksburg, Battle of Chancellorsville, Appomattox Campaign, defeated Robert E. Lee at the Battle of Gettysburg, commander Army of the Potomac (1863–1865); Fort George G. Meade in Maryland, home of the National Security Agency named in his honor | |
| William Tecumseh Sherman | 1840 | Major General; treated the demerit system at West Point with disdain, which lowered his class standing from fourth to sixth; Battle of Shiloh, Vicksburg Campaign, Chattanooga campaign, Atlanta campaign, Carolinas campaign, led the brutal Savannah Campaign (March to the Sea) from Atlanta to Savannah that demoralized the South; Commanding General of the United States Army (1869–1883) | |
| Schuyler Hamilton | 1841 | He was promoted to brigadier general of volunteers in November 1861 and served as a staff officer in the Department of the Missouri. At the Battle of Island Number Ten, Hamilton led the 2nd Division in the Army of the Mississippi. He was transferred to command the 3rd Division throughout much of the Siege of Corinth. Toward the close of that campaign Hamilton was elevated to command the Right Wing of the Army of the Mississippi, consisting of the 3rd and 4th Divisions. In September 1862, he was selected for promotion to major general but this promotion was never confirmed. Grandson of Founding Father Alexander Hamilton | |
| Ulysses S. Grant | 1843 | General of the Army of the United States; Mexican–American War; Siege of Vicksburg, Battle of Chattanooga, Siege of Petersburg, accepted Confederate surrender at Appomattox Court House; 18th President of the United States (1869–1877) | |
| Winfield Scott Hancock | 1844 | Major General; Mexican–American War; Battle of Gettysburg, Battle of the Wilderness, Battle of Spotsylvania Court House, led the Army of the Potomac; Democratic Party nominee for President (1880) | |
| George B. McClellan | 1846 | Major General; developed the McClellan Saddle; organized the Army of the Potomac after the Union forces were defeated at First Battle of Bull Run, Peninsula Campaign, Battle of Antietam; son George B. McClellan Jr. served as United States Representative from New York (1895–1903) and as Mayor of New York City (1904–1909) | |
| Philip Sheridan | 1853 | General; Battle of Chattanooga, Overland Campaign, Valley Campaigns of 1864, used scorched earth tactics in the Shenandoah Valley and forced Lee's surrender in the Appomattox Campaign; American Indian Wars | |
| Robert O. Tyler | 1857 | General; Peninsula Campaign, Battle of Fredericksburg, Battle of Chancellorsville, Battle of Gettysburg, Battle of Spotsylvania Court House, Battle of Cold Harbor | |
| George Armstrong Custer | 1861 | Major General; Battle of Antietam, Battle of Chancellorsville, leader of a charge at the Battle of Gettysburg that broke the back of the Confederate resistance; Battle of the Wilderness, Siege of Petersburg; Battle of the Washita, died at Battle of the Little Bighorn | |

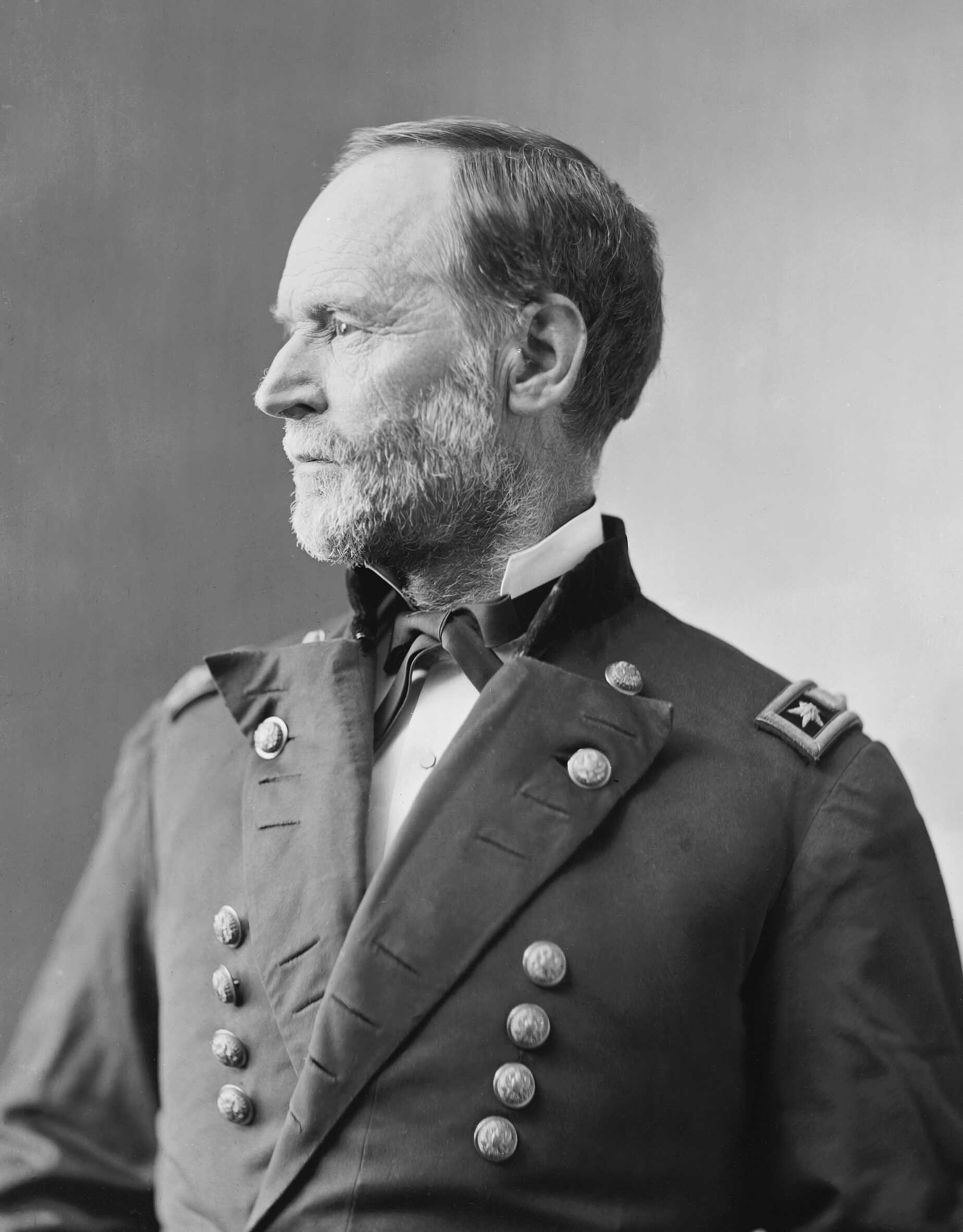
William Tecumseh Sherman (1840)

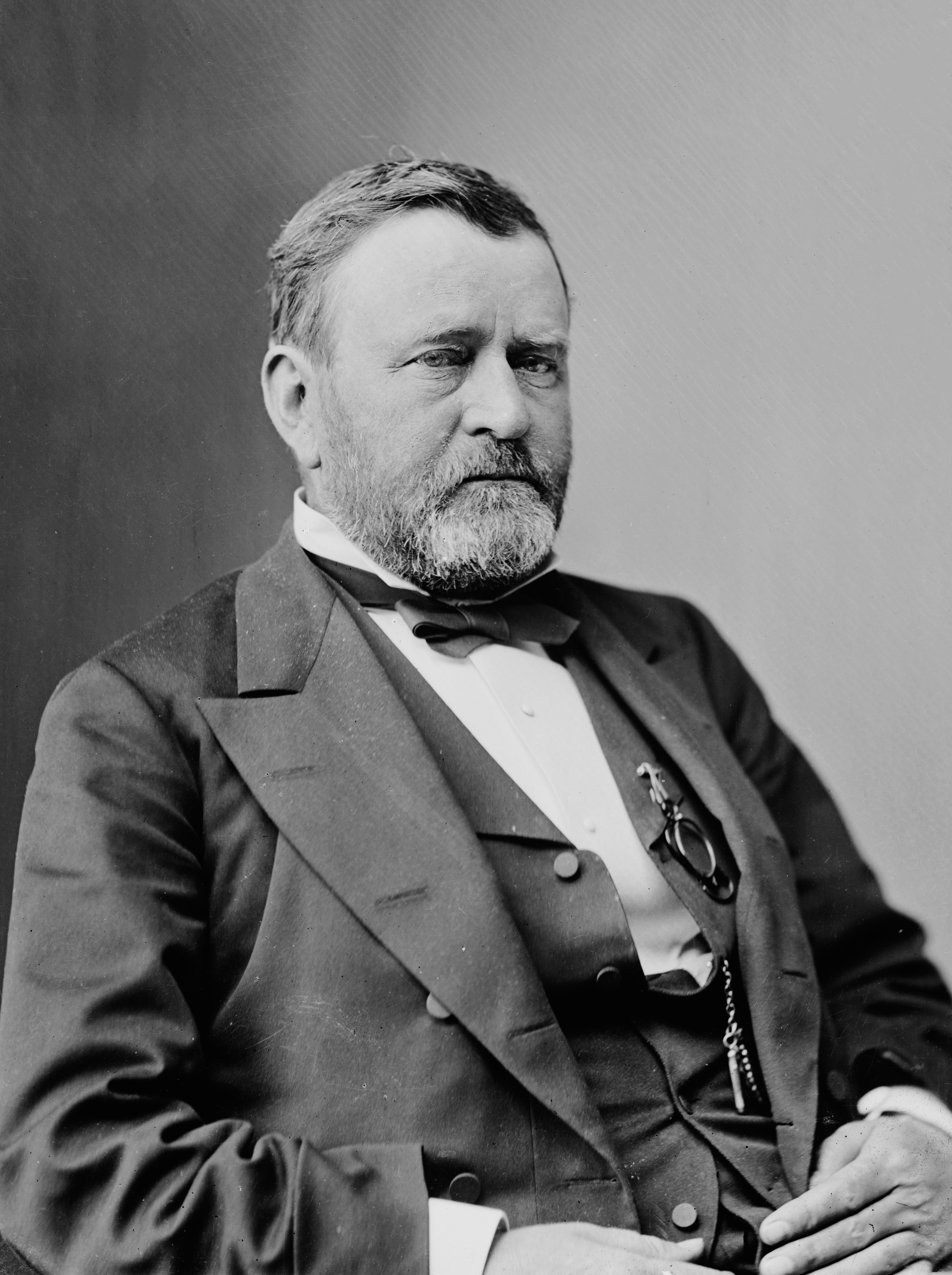
Ulysses S. Grant (1843)

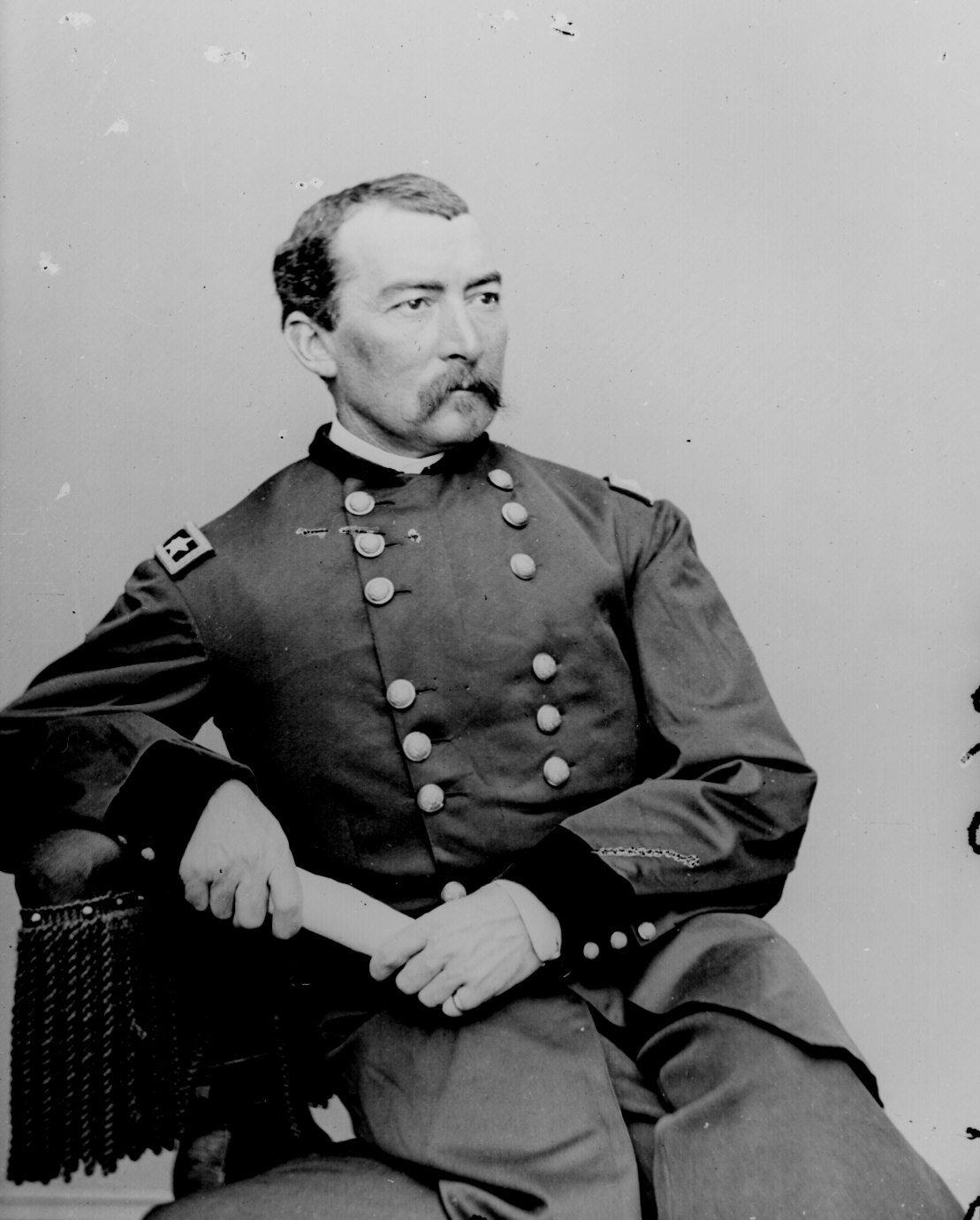
Philip Sheridan (1853)

=== Indian Wars combatants and Buffalo Soldiers ===
| Name / Class year / Notability / References; Hunter Liggett / 1879 / Lieutenant General; Indian Wars; Spanish–American War; Philippine–American War; in 1914 predicted that an invasion of the Philippines would occur through Lingayen Gulf, which occurred twice in World War II; division and corps commander in World War I |

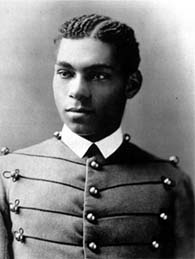
Henry Ossian Flipper, class of 1877, first African American graduate

- John Hanks Alexander, class of 1887
- Walker Keith Armistead, class of 1803
- John W. Barlow, class of 1861
- John T. Barnett, class of 1878
- Robert C. Buchanan, class of 1830
- Edward Canby, class of 1839
- Elias Chandler, class of 1880
- Philip St. George Cooke, class of 1827
- George Crook, class of 1852
- George Armstrong Custer, class of 1861
- John Wynn Davidson, class of 1845
- Henry Ossian Flipper, class of 1877
- James W. Forsyth, class of 1856
- Robert S. Garnett, class of 1841
- John Gibbon, class of 1847
- Oliver O. Howard, class of 1854
- Robert Lee Howze, class of 1888
- Charles King, class of 1866
- Thomas J. Lewis, class of 1875
- Gustavus Loomis, class of 1811
- Ranald S. Mackenzie, class of 1862
- Randolph B. Marcy, class of 1832
- Wesley Merritt, class of 1860
- George H. Morgan, class of 1880
- Edward Ord, class of 1839
- John J. Pershing, class of 1886
- John Pope (military officer), class of 1842
- Marcus Reno, class of 1857
- William Tecumseh Sherman, class of 1840
- Philip Sheridan, class of 1853
- Samuel D. Sturgis, class of 1846
- George Wright, class of 1822
- Charles Young, class of 1889

=== Spanish–American War and Philippine Insurrection combatants ===
| Name | Class year | Notability | References |
|---|---|---|---|
| Tasker H. Bliss | 1875 | General; Spanish–American War; division commander in Philippine–American War; Chief of Staff of the United States Army (1917–1918); American representative Supreme War Council | |
| Hunter Liggett | 1879 | Lieutenant General; Indian Wars; Spanish–American War; Philippine–American War; in 1914 predicted that an invasion of the Philippines would occur through Lingayen Gulf, which occurred twice in World War II; division and corps commander in World War I | |
| John J. Pershing | 1886 | General of the Armies; Spanish–American War; Philippine–American War; Moro Rebellion; commander of 8th Regiment in the Pancho Villa Expedition; led the American Expeditionary Force in World War I | |
| John L. Hines | 1891 | Major General; Spanish–American War; Philippine–American War; Pancho Villa Expedition; brigade and division commander in World War I; Chief of Staff of the United States Army (1924–1926) | |

- Stanley Dunbar Embick, class of 1899
- Frederick Dent Grant, class of 1871
- William G. Haan, class of 1889
- Hamilton S. Hawkins, class of 1855
- Guy Henry, class of 1898
- Lucius Roy Holbrook, class of 1896
- Willard Ames Holbrook, class of 1885
- Robert Lee Howze, class of 1888
- Richard L. Hoxie, class of 1868
- Jacob Ford Kent, class of 1861
- Charles King, class of 1866
- Fitzhugh Lee, class of 1856
- Manus MacCloskey, class of 1898
- Wesley Merritt, class of 1860
- Eben Swift, class of 1876
- Charles Symmonds, class of 1888
- Joseph Wheeler, class of 1859
- James H. Wilson, class of 1860
- John Moulder Wilson, class of 1860

=== Pancho Villa Expedition combatants ===
| Name | Class year | Notability | References |
|---|---|---|---|
| Eben Swift | 1876 | Major General; Spanish–American War, World War I; Director of the United States Army War College; commander of Camp Gordon; commander of the 82nd Division; commander of U.S. Forces in Italy; father of Major General Innis P. Swift; father-in-law of Brigadier General Evan Harris Humphrey; son-in-law of Brigadier General Innis N. Palmer; Camp Swift, Texas is named for him | |
| John J. Pershing | 1886 | General of the Armies; Spanish–American War; Philippine–American War; Moro Rebellion; commander of 8th Regiment in the Pancho Villa Expedition; led the American Expeditionary Force in World War I | |
| John L. Hines | 1891 | Major General; Spanish–American War; Philippine–American War; Pancho Villa Expedition; brigade and division commander in World War I; Chief of Staff of the United States Army (1924–1926) | |
| Hugh S. Johnson | 1903 | Brigadier General; lawyer in Judge Advocate General's Corps; instrumental in implementing the Selective Service Act of 1917; Deputy Provost Marshal General (1971–1918); Director of the Purchase and Supply Branch of the General Staff (1918); commander of 15th Infantry Brigade; Director of the National Recovery Administration; named Time Person of the Year in 1933 | |
| Allen W. Gullion | 1905 | Major General (U.S. Army J.A.G. Corps; U.S. Army Military Police Corps). During the Pancho Villa Expedition, Gullion served with the 2nd Kentucky Infantry on the Mexican border in 1916. He was promoted to the temporary rank of Lieutenant Colonel during World War I and was assigned to the Office of the Provost Marshal, where he served as a Chief of Mobilization Division. During World War II, Gullion was appointed the U.S. Army Provost Marshal in 1941. Gullion served in this capacity until 1944. Gullion was a prime mover in the efforts to intern American citizens of Japanese ancestry in camps in the wake of the hysteria resulting from the Pearl Harbor attack. | |
| George S. Patton | 1909 | General; 1912 Summer Olympics, modern pentathlon, 5th place; Pancho Villa Expedition; World War II; Battle of Saint-Mihiel, Meuse-Argonne Offensive; commander of the 1st Tank Brigade/304th Tank Brigade; commander of the 3rd Cavalry Regiment; commander of the 2nd Armored Division; commander of the II Corps; commander of the Seventh United States Army, Third United States Army, and Fifteenth United States Army during World War II; descendant of Brigadier General Hugh Mercer; father of Major General George Patton IV; Patton series of tanks was named for him | |
| Carl Andrew Spaatz | 1914 | General; Pancho Villa Expedition; flight instructor and fighter pilot in World War I; Eighth Air Force commander in World War II; first Chief of Staff of the United States Air Force (1947–1948) | |
| Luis R. Esteves | 1915 | Major General; second Hispanic graduate of the Academy; Pancho Villa Expedition; mayor and judge of Polvo, Mexico; commander of the 23rd Battalion, which was composed of Puerto Ricans and stationed in Panama during World War I; commander of 92nd Infantry Brigade Combat Team during World War II; founder of the Puerto Rico National Guard | |
| Dwight Johns | 1916 | Brigadier General; World War I, Pancho Villa Expedition, World War II; recipients of the Army Distinguished Service Medal | |

=== World War I combatants ===
| Name | Class year | Notability | References |
|---|---|---|---|
| Tasker H. Bliss | 1875 | General; Spanish–American War; division commander in Philippine–American War; Chief of Staff of the United States Army (1917–1918); American representative Supreme War Council | |
| Hunter Liggett | 1879 | Lieutenant General; Indian Wars; Spanish–American War; Philippine–American War; in 1914 predicted that an invasion of the Philippines would occur through Lingayen Gulf, which occurred twice in World War II; division and corps commander in World War I | |
| Mason Patrick | 1886 | Major General; commander of 1st Engineers in France (1917–1918); Chief of U.S. Air Service (1918); Chief of U.S. Air Corps (1926–1927) | |
| John J. Pershing | 1886 | General of the Armies; Spanish–American War; Philippine–American War; Moro Rebellion; commander of 8th Regiment in the Pancho Villa Expedition; led the American Expeditionary Force in World War I | |
| John L. Hines | 1891 | Major General; Spanish–American War; Philippine–American War; Pancho Villa Expedition; brigade and division commander in World War I; Chief of Staff of the United States Army (1924–1926) | |
| George Van Horn Moseley | 1899 | Major General. Famously controversial after retirement from the Army for anti-semitic and anti-immigrant views. | |
| Adna R. Chaffee Jr. | 1902 | Called the "Father of the Armored Force" for his role in developing the U.S. Army's tank forces. The M24 Chaffee light tank is named after him. Fort Chaffee, Arkansas, near Fort Smith, Arkansas, is named in his honor. | |
| Luis R. Esteves | 1915 | Major General; second Hispanic graduate of the Academy; Pancho Villa Expedition; mayor and judge of Polvo, Mexico; commander of the 23rd Battalion, which was composed of Puerto Ricans and stationed in Panama during World War I; commander of 92nd Infantry Brigade Combat Team during World War II; founder of the Puerto Rico National Guard | |

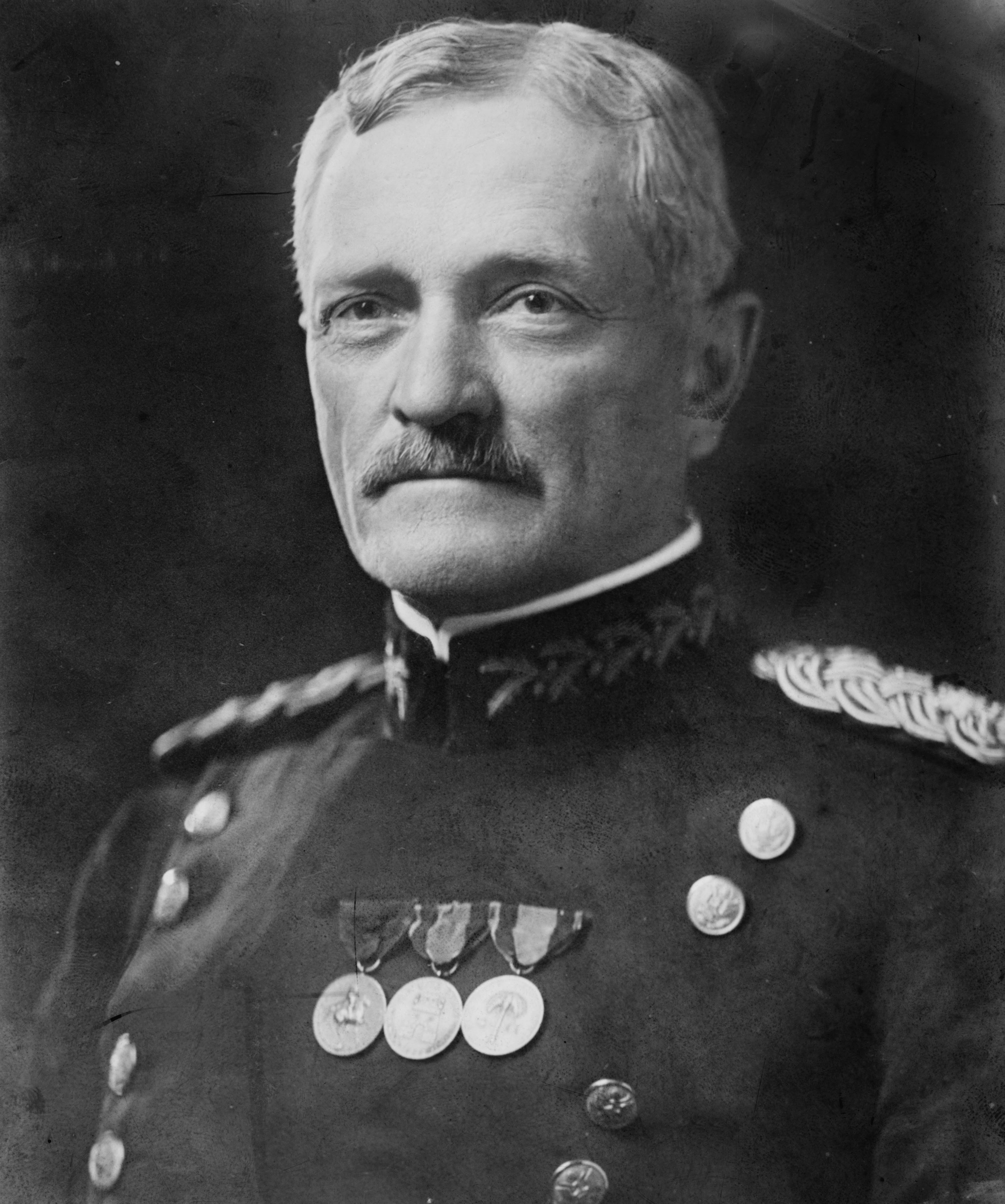
John Pershing (1886)

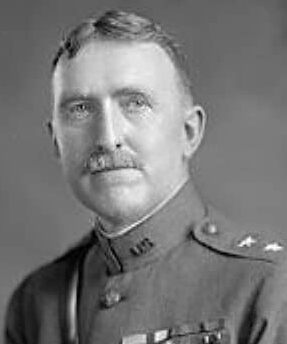
John Hines (1891)

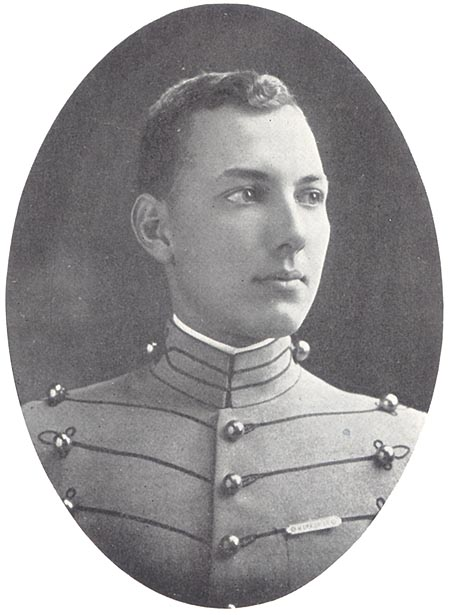
Cadet Luis R. Esteves (1915)

=== World War II combatants ===
Note: "Class year" refers to the alumni's class year, which usually is the same year they graduated. However, due to the war in Europe, the Class of 1943 graduated early, in January '43, becoming the only class to do so.

| Name | Class year | Notability | References |
|---|---|---|---|
| Guy Henry | 1898 | Major general; Spanish–American War, Philippine–American War, World War I; commander of the 3rd Cavalry Regiment; recipient of two Army Distinguished Service Medals and the Silver Star; son of Brigadier General, Medal of Honor recipient, and Puerto Rico Governor Guy Vernor Henry | |
| Stanley Dunbar Embick | 1899 | Lieutenant general; Spanish–American War, World War I; recipient of two Army Distinguished Service Medals; father-in-law of General Albert Coady Wedemeyer | |
| Douglas MacArthur | 1903 | General of the Army, Field Marshal in the Philippine Army; United States occupation of Veracruz; Second Battle of the Marne, Battle of Saint-Mihiel, Meuse-Argonne Offensive during World War I; commander of the 42nd Infantry Division; Superintendent of the United States Military Academy (1919–22); brigade commander in the Philippine Division; commander of the Philippine Department; Chief of Staff of the United States Army (1930–35); recipient of the Medal of Honor for actions during the Battle of Bataan, commander of the South West Pacific Area during World War II; Supreme Commander of the Allied Powers during the Occupation of Japan; Korean War; grandson of Wisconsin Governor Arthur MacArthur, Sr.; son of Lieutenant General and Medal of Honor recipient Arthur MacArthur, Jr. | |
| Henry Conger Pratt | 1904 | Major general; World War I; aide to William Howard Taft; commander of Brooks Field, Kelly Field, and Mitchel Field; Commandant of the Air Corps Tactical School; commander of the Philippine Division; commander of Fort William McKinley; commander of the Southern Defense Command and Western Defense Command; recipient of the Army Distinguished Service Medal | |
| Joseph Stilwell | 1904 | General; described Academy hazing as "hell"; U.S. Fourth Corps intelligence officer and helped plan the St. Mihiel offensive during World War I; commander of American forces in the China Burma India Theater in World War II | |
| Frank Maxwell Andrews | 1906 | Lieutenant general; commanded airfields in America during World War I, staff of Army of Occupation in Germany after the war; commander of the 1st Pursuit Group; commander of the General Headquarters Air Force and Panama Canal Air Force; commander of the Caribbean Defense Command; commander of the U.S. Army Forces in the Middle East; commander of U.S. forces of the European Theater of Operations; Joint Base Andrews Naval Air Facility, Andrews Air Force Base, and RAF Andrews Field are named for him | |
| Rene Edward De Russy Hoyle | 1906 | Major general; commander of the 9th Infantry Division; son of Brigadier General Eli D. Hoyle; grandson of Brigadier General René Edward De Russy | |
| Henry H. "Hap" Arnold | 1907 | General of the Army, General of the Air Force; Second rated pilot in the United States Army Air Corps; executive officer of the aviation section at Army headquarters in Washington D.C. during World War I; World War II; commander of the United States Army Command and General Staff College; commander of March Field; commander of the United States Army Air Forces; founder of the RAND Corporation; Arnold Air Force Base, Arnold Engineering Development Center, and Arnold Air Society are named for him | |
| Simon Bolivar Buckner, Jr. | 1908 | General; World War I; Battle of Dutch Harbor, killed at the Battle of Okinawa; commander of the Alaska Defense Command; commander of the Tenth United States Army; son of Kentucky Governor and Confederate State Lieutenant General Simon Bolivar Buckner | |
| Jacob L. Devers | 1909 | General; Operation Dragoon, Operation Overlord, Operation Varsity; commander of the 9th Infantry Division; commander of the Sixth United States Army Group | |
| Robert L. Eichelberger | 1909 | General; American Expeditionary Force Siberia; Superintendent of the Academy (1940–42); commanded Eighth United States Army in World War II | |
| Delos Carleton Emmons | 1909 | Lieutenant general; company commander in the 30th Infantry Regiment; commander of the Western Defense Command; commandant of the Armed Forces Staff College | |
| George S. Patton | 1909 | General; 1912 Summer Olympics, modern pentathlon, 5th place; Pancho Villa Expedition; World War II; Battle of Saint-Mihiel, Meuse-Argonne Offensive; commander of the 1st Tank Brigade/304th Tank Brigade; commander of the 3rd Cavalry Regiment; commander of the 2nd Armored Division; commander of the II Corps; commander of the Seventh United States Army, Third United States Army, and Fifteenth United States Army during World War II; descendant of Brigadier General Hugh Mercer; father of Major General George Patton IV; Patton series of tanks were named for him | |
| Oscar Griswold | 1910 | Lieutenant general; World War I; Solomon Islands campaign, Bougainville campaign, Philippines campaign (1944-45); commander of the 29th Infantry Regiment and 4th Infantry Regiment; commander of the XIV Corps; commander of the Seventh United States Army and the Third United States Army; recipient of two Army Distinguished Service Medals, Navy Distinguished Service Medal, and two Silver Stars | |
| Stephen J. Chamberlin | 1912 | Lieutenant general; World War I; commander of the Fifth Army; recipient of the Navy Cross, the Army Distinguished Service Medal, and the Silver Star | |
| Carl Andrew Spaatz | 1914 | General; Pancho Villa Expedition; flight instructor and fighter pilot in World War I; Eighth Air Force commander in World War II; first Chief of Staff of the United States Air Force (1947–48) | |
| Omar Bradley | 1915 | General of the Army; stationed in America during World War I; commander of the 82nd Infantry Division and 28th Infantry Division in non-combat areas prior to being assigned to combat in Operation Torch, Normandy Landings, Operation Cobra, Battle of the Bulge, commander of the First United States Army, commander of the Twelfth United States Army Group; Korean War; first Chairman of the Joint Chiefs of Staff; Administrator of the Veterans Administration; Chairman of the NATO Military Committee; Bradley Fighting Vehicle named for him | |
| Donald Angus Davison | 1915 | Major general; North African Campaign; Davison Army Airfield is named for him | |
| Dwight D. Eisenhower | 1915 | General of the Army; trained tank crews in Pennsylvania during World War I; World War II; commander of European Theater of Operations and Supreme Headquarters Allied Expeditionary Force (1942–45); 1st Military Governor of American Occupation Zone in Germany (1945); President of Columbia University (1948–50, 1952–53); 1st Supreme Allied Commander Europe (1951–52); 34th President of the United States (1953–61) | |
| Luis R. Esteves | 1915 | Major general; first Hispanic graduate of the Academy; Pancho Villa Expedition; mayor and judge of Polvo, Mexico; commander of the 23rd Battalion, which was composed of Puerto Ricans and stationed in Panama during World War I; commander of 92nd Infantry Brigade Combat Team during World War II; founder of the Puerto Rico National Guard | |
| Thomas B. Larkin | 1915 | Lieutenant general; first commander of the 11th Airborne Division (1943-1947) | |
| Joseph May Swing | 1915 | Lieutenant general; reconnaissance officer during Second Battle of the Marne; Tunisia Campaign in World War II; Quartermaster General (1946–49) | |
| Dwight Johns | 1916 | Brigadier general; World War I, Pancho Villa Expedition; recipients of the Army Distinguished Service Medal | |
| Mark W. Clark | 1917 | General; World War I, Korean War; Operation Torch, Battle of Monte Cassino; commander of the II Corps; commander of the Fifth United States Army; commander of the 15th Army Group; commander of the United Nations Command; President of The Citadel, The Military College of South Carolina | |
| J. Lawton Collins | 1917 | General; Invasion of Normandy, Operation Cobra; Chief of Staff of the VII Corps; Chief of Staff of the Hawaiian Department; commander of the 25th Infantry Division | |
| Norman Cota | 1917 | Major general; Operation Torch, Allied invasion of Sicily, Normandy Landings, Battle of Hürtgen Forest; commander of the 28th Infantry Division | |
| George Douglas Wahl | 1917 | Brigadier general; son of Major General Lutz Wahl | |
| Hugh John Casey | 1918 | Major general; instructor and engineer company commander during World War I; Chief Engineer for General of the Army Douglas MacArthur for the South West Pacific theatre of World War II; initial designer of The Pentagon; father of Major Hugh Boyd Casey; father-in-law of Major General Frank Butner Clay | |
| Lucius D. Clay | 1918 | General; Military Governor of Allied-occupied Germany; son of U.S. Senator Alexander S. Clay; father of Major General Frank Butner Clay (West Point Class of 1942) and Air Force General Lucius D. Clay, Jr. (West Point Class of 1942) | |
| Willard Ames Holbrook, Jr. | 1918 | Brigadier general; commander of the 12th Armored Division; son of Major General Willard Ames Holbrook; nephew of Major General Lucius Roy Holbrook; grandson of Major General David S. Stanley; grandson-in-law of Brigadier General Eli D. Hoyle; great-grandson-in-law of Brigadier General René Edward De Russy | |
| William M. Miley | 1918 | Major general; World War I; commander of the 503rd Parachute Infantry Regiment; commander of the 17th Airborne Division and 11th Airborne Division; recipient of the Silver Star and two Army Distinguished Service Medals | |
| Nathan Farragut Twining | 1919 | General; Pancho Villa Expedition; commander of the Thirteenth Air Force, Fifteenth Air Force, and Twentieth Air Force; commander of the Air Material Command and the Alaskan Air Command; Air Force Chief of Staff; Chairman of the Joint Chiefs of Staff; recipient of the Army Distinguished Service Medal and the Navy Distinguished Service Medal | |
| Arthur L. McCullough | 1920 | Brigadier general; Allied invasion of Sicily; commander of the 514th Troop Carrier Wing and 313th Trooper Carrier Wing; recipient of the Legion of Merit | |
| Hugo P. Rush | 1920 | Major general; commander of the 44th Bombardment Group and the 98th Bombardment Group; commander of the 15th Wing, 47th Bombardment Wing, 17th Bomb Operational Training Wing, and 301st Fighter Wing; commander of the VIII Bomber Command; commander of Keesler Field; recipient of the Distinguished Service Medal, the Silver Star, and the Legion of Merit | |
| Hoyt Vandenberg | 1923 | General; commander of the 90th Attack Squadron; commander of the Twelfth Air Force and the Ninth Air Force; Director of Central Intelligence; Air Force Chief of Staff; recipient of two Army Distinguished Service Medals and the Silver Star; Vandenberg Air Force Base is named for him; the Navy vessel USNS General Hoyt S. Vandenberg (T-AGM-10) was named for him; father of Major General Hoyt S. Vandenberg, Jr.; nephew of U.S. Senator Arthur H. Vandenberg | |
| Lawrence Russell Dewey | 1924 | Major general; Korean War; troop commander; Chief of Staff of the 1st Armored Division and the IX Corps; recipient of the Silver Star, the Legion of Merit, and the Bronze Star Medal | |
| Monro MacCloskey | 1924 | Brigadier general; commander of the 885th Bombardment Squadron; commander of the 2641st Special Group; commander of the 28th Air Division; recipient of the Silver Star and the Legion of Merit; son of Brigadier General Manus MacCloskey | |
| Mickey Marcus | 1924 | Colonel (USA) and Israeli Army Major General (Aluf); lawyer; World War II civil affairs officer, parachuted into the Battle of Normandy, helped draw up the surrender terms for Italy and Germany and became part of the occupation government in Berlin; portrayed by Kirk Douglas in Cast a Giant Shadow; organized, trained, and led Israeli forces during the 1948 Arab–Israeli War, killed by friendly fire in 1948 in Israel | |
| James Roy Andersen | 1926 | Brigadier general; Andersen Air Force Base is named for him | |
| Herbert W. Ehrgott | 1926 | Brigadier general; recipient of the Legion of Merit | |
| Ralph Wise Zwicker | 1927 | Major general; Normandy landings; commander of the 38th Infantry Regiment and 18th Infantry Regiment; commander of Camp Kilmer; commander of the 24th Infantry Division and 1st Cavalry Division; commander of the XX Corps; recipient of the Silver Star | |
| Charles F. Born | 1928 | Major general; commander of the 50th Observation Squadron; commander of the Antilles Air Command; commander of the Second Air Force and Fifteenth Air Force; recipient of the Air Force Distinguished Service Medal and Legion of Merit | |
| Howard G. Bunker | 1928 | Major general; recipient of the Legion of Merit | |
| Robert T. Frederick | 1928 | Major general; Operation Dragoon; commander of the Devil's Brigade; commander of the 1st Airborne Task Force; commander of the 45th Infantry Division, 4th Infantry Division, and 6th Infantry Division | |
| John S. Mills | 1928 | Major general; recipient of the Distinguished Service Medal, the Silver Star, and the Legion of Merit | |
| Harold Huntley Bassett | 1929 | Major general; commander of the U.S. Air Force Security Service and the Air Weather Service; commander of the United States Taiwan Defense Command; recipient of the Legion of Merit | |
| James M. Gavin | 1929 | Lieutenant general; Korean War; Allied invasion of Sicily, Operation Overlord, Operation Market Garden; company commander in the 7th Infantry Regiment and the 503rd Parachute Infantry Battalion; commander of the 505th Parachute Infantry Regiment; U.S. Ambassador to France; the Gavin Power Plant in Cheshire, Ohio is named for him | |
| Marshall S. Roth | 1929 | Major general; commander of the 375th Troop Carrier Group and 317th Troop Carrier Group; recipient of the Legion of Merit | |
| John F. R. Seitz | 1929 | Major General, United States Army. Commanded an infantry battalion at Schofield Barracks at Oahu, Hawaii, on December 7, 1941, during the Japanese attack on Pearl Harbor. Commanded the combat team at Omaha Beach during the Normandy landings on D-Day, in the breakout from Normandy and at the approach to close the gap in the Falaise Pocket. Recipient of the Silver Star. Buried in Arlington National Cemetery. | |
| Hamilton H. Howze | 1930 | General; commander of the 1st Armored Division and 82nd Airborne Division; commander of the XVIII Airborne Corps; commander of the Third United States Army and Eighth United States Army; recipient of the Army Distinguished Service Medal and the Silver Star; son of Major General Robert Lee Howze | |
| Phillips Waller Smith | 1930 | Major general; recipient of the Legion of Merit | |
| Gordon Blake | 1931 | Lieutenant general; commander of the U.S. Air Force Security Service; Chief of Staff of the Pacific Air Forces; Director of the National Security Agency | |
| Edwin Walker | 1931 | United States Army major general who served in World War II and the Korean War, commanding the 3rd Regiment of the First Special Service Force during the Aleutian Islands campaign and combat operations in Italy, including the Anzio campaign and the liberation of southern France during Operation Dragoon. During the Korean War, he commanded the 7th Infantry Regiment of the 3rd Infantry Division and served as a senior adviser to the South Korean Army. Later, as commander of the Arkansas Military District, he helped enforce President Dwight D. Eisenhower's desegregation orders at Central High School in Little Rock, Arkansas, in 1957. After assuming command of the 24th Infantry Division in Augsburg, Germany, in 1959, Walker resigned his commission in 1961, and in April 1963 narrowly escaped an assassination attempt at his Dallas home by Lee Harvey Oswald, later identified by the Warren Commission as the gunman. | |
| David William Hutchison | 1931 | Major general; Battle of Biak, Battle of Leyte, Battle of Luzon; commander of the 308th Bombardment Wing and 97th Bombardment Wing; commander of the 314th Air Division, 21st Air Division, and the 5th Air Division; commander of the Seventeenth Air Force and Ninth Air Force; recipient of the Distinguished Service Medal and Silver Star | |
| William Orlando Darby | 1933 | Brigadier general; killed during the Italian Campaign; Camp Darby is named for him | |
| Arno H. Luehman | 1934 | Major general; Chief of Staff of Operations of the Third Air Force; Chief of Staff of the Thirteenth Air Force; Commandant of the Air War College | |
| Thomas Cebern Musgrave, Jr. | 1935 | Major general; commander of the 47th Air Division and 7th Air Division; Director of Manpower and Organization; recipient of the Legion of Merit | |
| Robert M. Stillman | 1935 | Major general; commander of the 322d Bombardment Group; commander of Stewart Field; commander of Lackland Military Training Center; commander of 313th Air Division; prisoner of war; Commandant of Cadets at United States Air Force Academy; recipient of the Silver Star; recipient of the Legion of Merit; recipient of the Bronze Star Medal; recipient of the Purple Heart | |
| Chester Victor Clifton, Jr. | 1936 | Major general; recipient of the Army Distinguished Service Medal; senior military aide to John F. Kennedy and Lyndon B. Johnson | |
| Benjamin O. Davis Jr. | 1936 | General; Korean War; commander of the 99th Pursuit Squadron; commander of the 51st Fighter-Interceptor Wing; Chief of Staff of the Twelfth Air Force and Thirteenth Air Force; son of Brigadier General Benjamin O. Davis Sr. | |
| Richard W. Fellows | 1937 | Brigadier general; Philippines Campaign; commander of the 30th Bombardment Group and 376th Bombardment Group; commander of Pepperrell Air Force Base and Ernest Harmon Air Force Base; recipient of the Silver Star | |
| Edward J. York | 1938 | Colonel; Doolittle Raid, only West Point graduate to take part in the raid and served as operations officer of the raid; commander of 95th Bombardment Squadron; commander of the Air Force Officer Training School; recipient of the Legion of Merit, the Distinguished Flying Cross, the Bronze Star Medal and three Air Medals | |
| John S. Samuel | 1939 | Major general; Invasion of Normandy, Allied advance from Paris to the Rhine, Battle of the Bulge, Western Allied invasion of Germany; commander of the 322d Bombardment Group; commander of Carswell Air Force Base; commander of the 816th Air Division; Director of the U.S. Air Force Office of Special Investigations; recipient of the Distinguished Service Medal, the Silver Star, and the Legion of Merit | |
| Donald V. Bennett | 1940 | General; Normandy Landings; Superintendent of the United States Military Academy; Director of the Defense Intelligence Agency; commander of the United States Army Pacific | |
| Fred Ascani | 1941 | Major general; squadron commander in the 483rd Bomb Group; commander of the 86th Fighter Interceptor Group; commander of the 50th Fighter Bomber Wing | |
| William C. Gribble, Jr. | 1941 | Lieutenant general; battalion commander in the 43rd Infantry Division; Chief of Engineers; recipient of two Army Distinguished Service Medals | |
| Robin Olds | 1943 | Brigadier general; Vietnam War; group commander in the 86th Fighter-Interceptor Wing; commander of the No. 1 Squadron RAF and 434th Fighter Squadron; commander of the 81st Tactical Wing and the 8th Tactical Fighter Wing; recipient of the Air Force Cross, two Air Force Distinguished Service Medals, and four Silver Stars; son of Major General Robert Olds | |

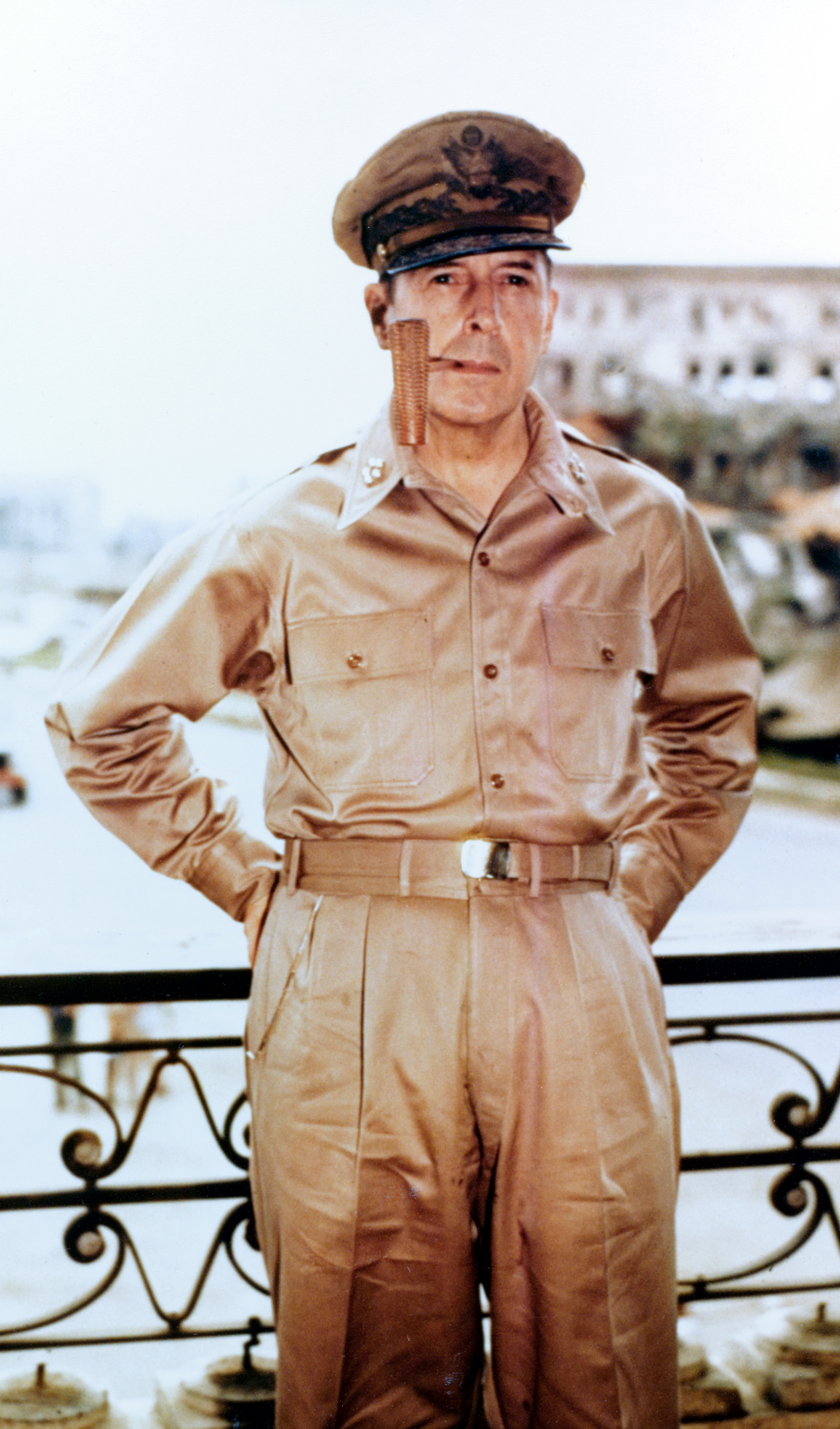
Douglas MacArthur (1903)

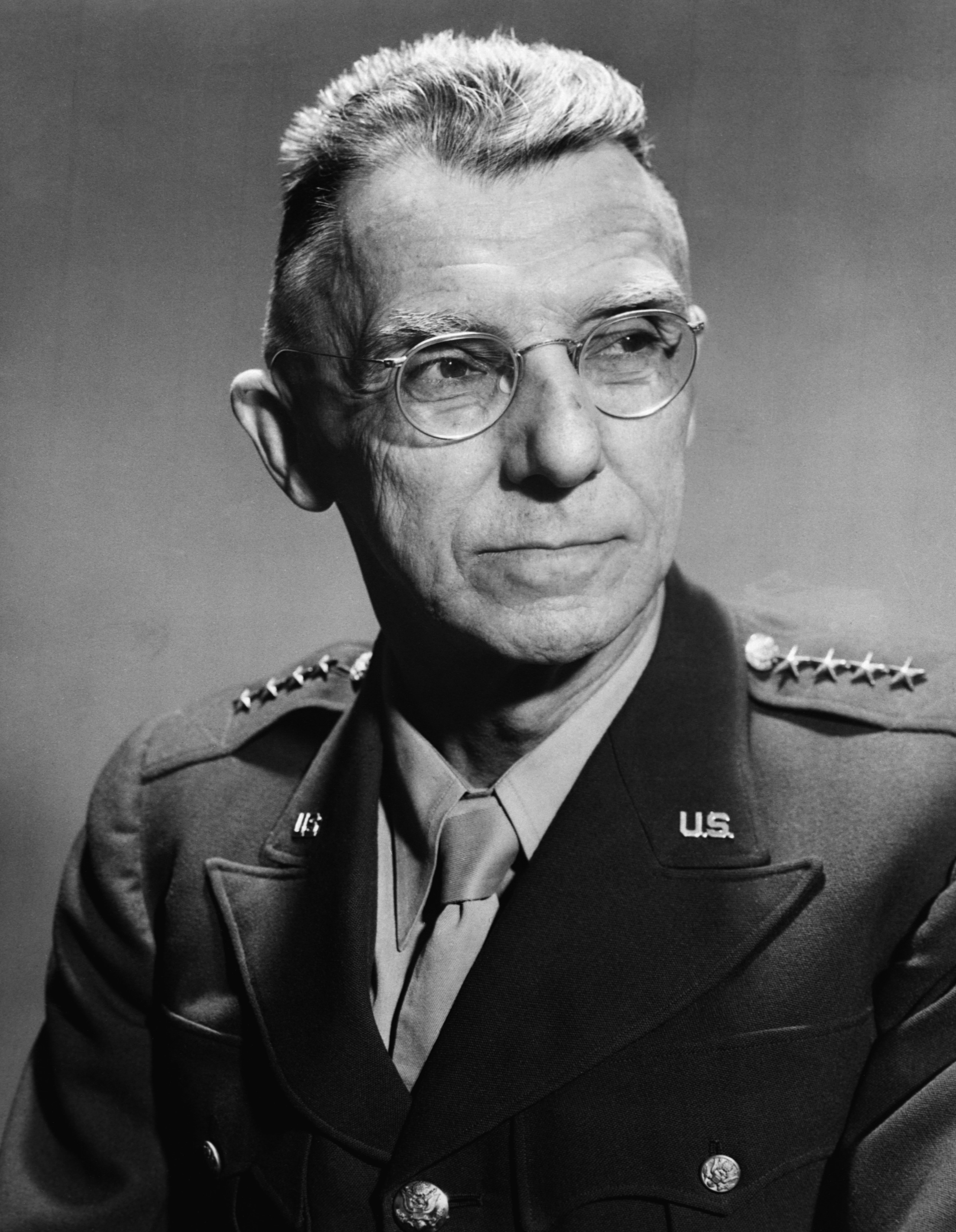
Joseph Stilwell (1904)

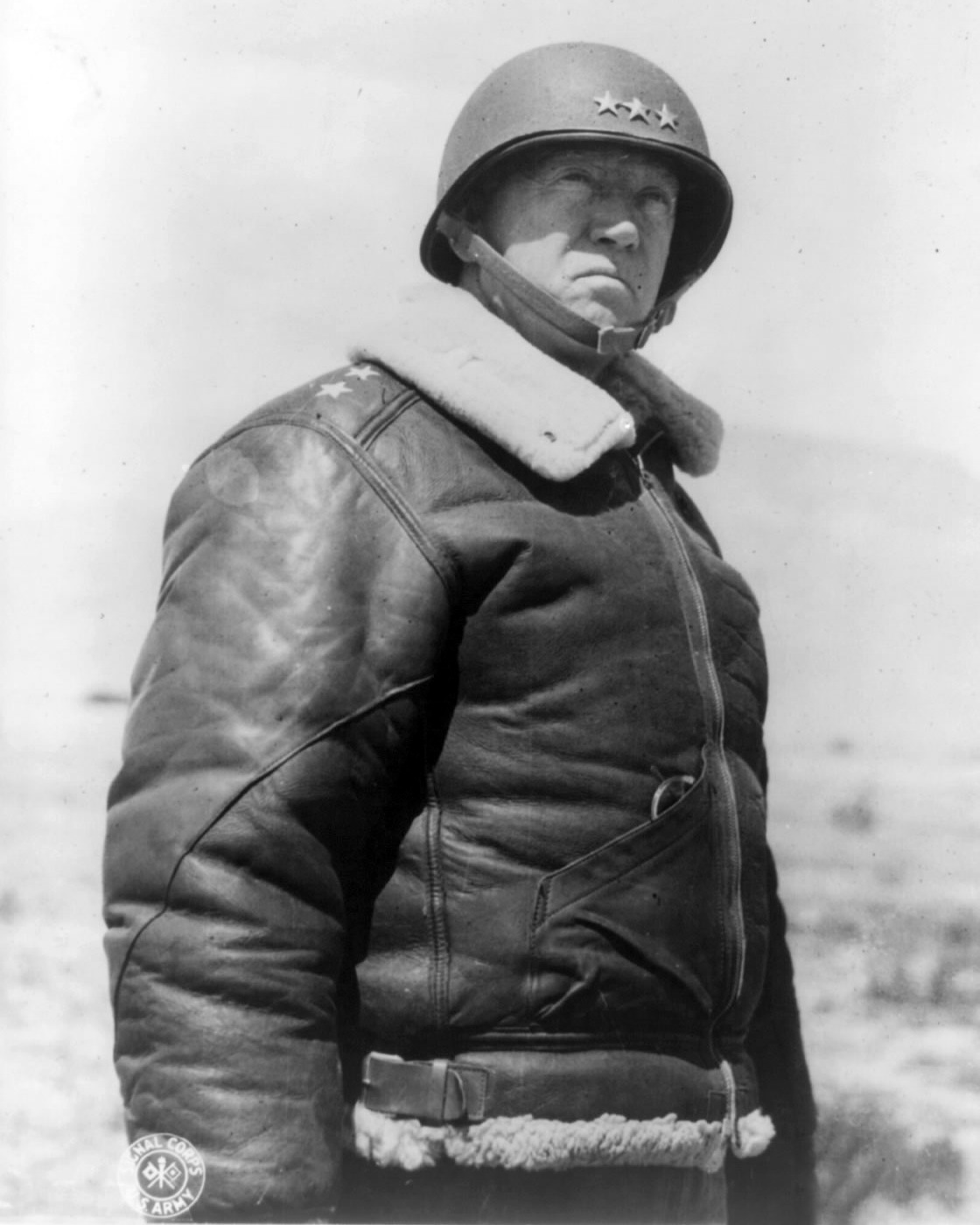
George S. Patton (1909)

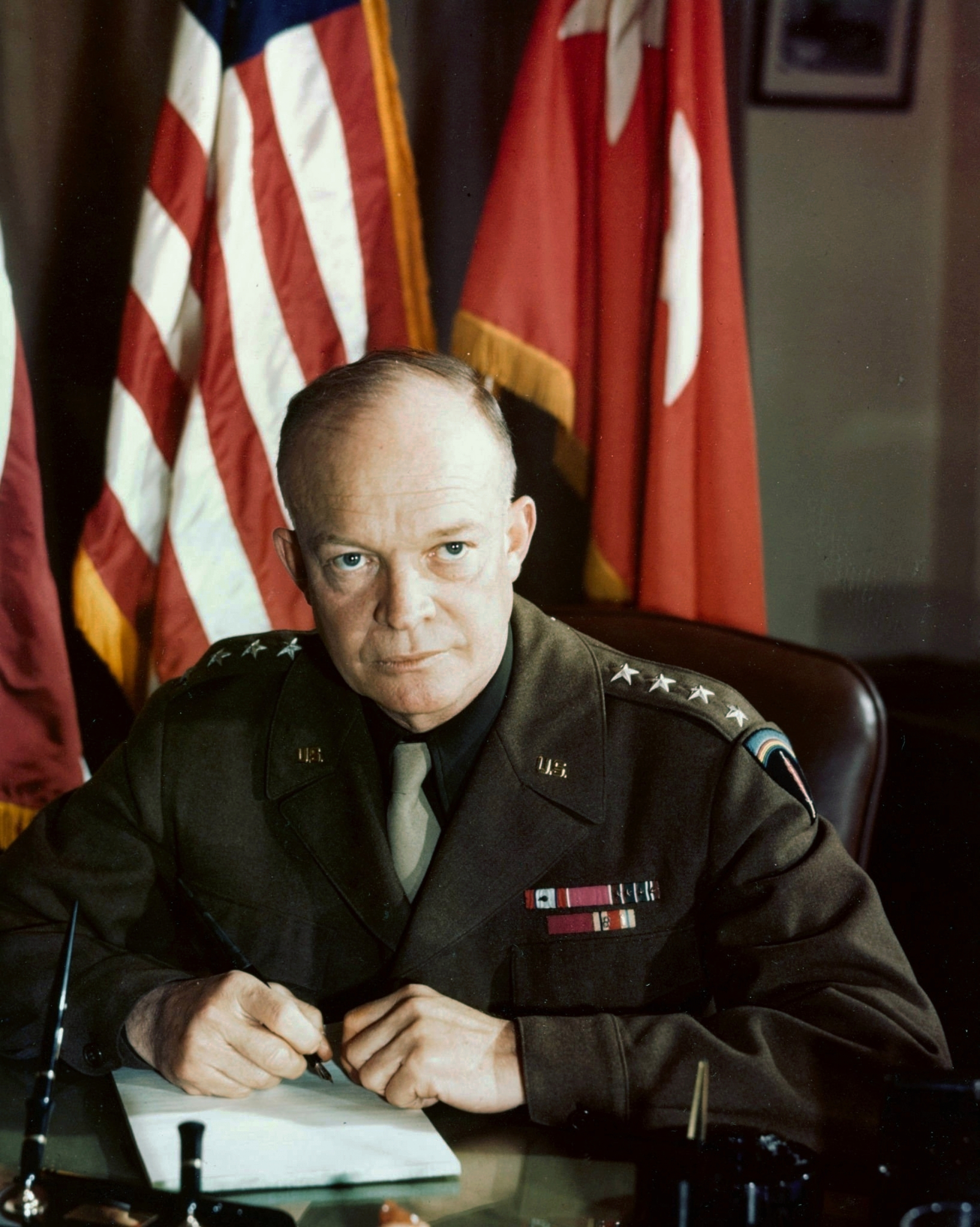
Dwight D. Eisenhower (1915)

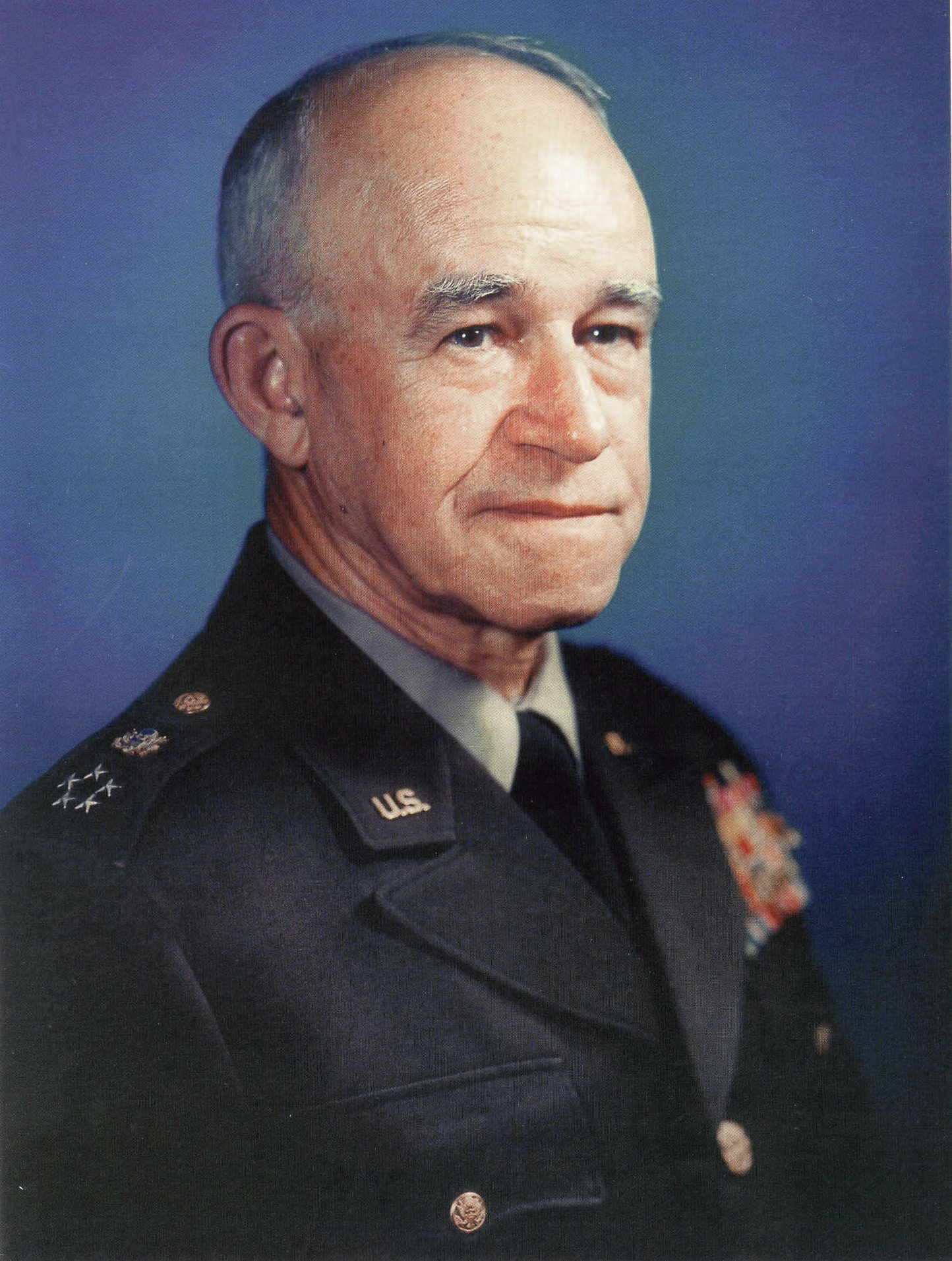
Omar Bradley (1915)

- Arthur F. Gorham, Class of 1938, First Commander of the 1/505th PIR, 82nd Airborne.
- Ulysses S. Grant III, Class of 1903. Major General; Head of Protection Branch, Office of Civilian Defense
- Leslie Groves, Class of 1918
- Alfred Gruenther, Class of 1919
- Hubert R. Harmon, Class of 1915
- William M. Hoge, Class of 1916
- Geoffrey Keyes, Class of 1913
- John C. H. Lee, Class of 1909
- Lyman Lemnitzer, Class of 1920
- Herbert B. Loper, Class of 1919
- John P. Lucas, Class of 1911
- Vicente Lim, Class of 1914, served under Douglas MacArthur, general Philippine Scouts
- Anthony McAuliffe, Class of 1918
- John P. McConnell, Class of 1932
- Horace L. McBride, Class of 1916, Commander of the 80th Infantry Division
- Lesley J. McNair, Class of 1904
- Joseph T. McNarney, Class of 1915
- Frank Merrill, Class of 1929
- Virgil R. Miller, Class of 1924. Regimental Commander of the 442d Regimental Combat Team
- James Edward Moore, Class of 1924
- Otto L. Nelson, Jr., Class of 1924
- Andrew P. O'Meara, Class of 1930
- Alexander Patch, Class of 1913
- Matthew Ridgway, Class of 1917.
- Edward Rowny, Class of 1941
- John Dale Ryan, Class of 1938
- Antulio Segarra, Class of 1927
- William Hood Simpson, Class of 1909
- Brehon B. Somervell, Class of 1914
- Daniel Isom Sultan, Class of 1907
- Maxwell D. Taylor, Class of 1922
- Thomas J. H. Trapnell, Class of 1927
- William H. Tunner, Class of 1928
- George V. Underwood, Jr., Class 1937
- James Van Fleet, Class of 1915
- Jonathan Wainwright, Class of 1906
- Walton Walker, Class of 1912
- Albert Coady Wedemeyer, Class of 1919
- Raymond Albert Wheeler, Class of 1911
  - Major general in United States Army Corps of Engineers developing a transportation network in the Middle East to ship munitions to the Soviet Union (1942–1943); South East Asia Command on the staff of Admiral Lord Louis Mountbatten, Supreme Allied Commander South East Asia, where duties including directing construction of the Ledo Road (1943–1944); Lieutenant general and Deputy Supreme Allied Commander South East Asia (1944–1945), during which he was the U.S. representative accepting the Japanese surrender in Singapore. Immediately after the war, became the Army Corps of Engineers' overall Chief of Engineers.
- Thomas D. White, Class of 1920
  - assistant chief of staff for operations, and then chief of staff, of the Third Air Force at MacDill Field, Florida,(1942–1943); assistant chief of air staff for intelligence Army Air Forces Headquarters at The Pentagon, Virginia (January to August 1944); deputy commander of the Thirteenth Air Force in the Southwest Pacific, taking part in the campaigns of New Guinea, Southern Philippines and Borneo; assumed command of the Seventh Air Force, which had based its headquarters in the Marianas and immediately moved with it to the recently taken Okinawa (June 1945 to beyond war's end). Would later be the Chief of Staff of the United States Air Force.
- Walter K. Wilson Jr., Class of 1929
  - during WWII was a Lieutenant colonel in Army Corps of Engineers, Deputy Engineer-in-Chief with the South East Asia Command (1943–1945); Commanding General, Advance Section, U.S. Forces, China Burma India Theater, and Chief of Staff of X Force (the Chinese Army in India) (1945). Would later be the Army Corps of Engineers' overall Chief of Engineers.

=== Korean War combatants ===
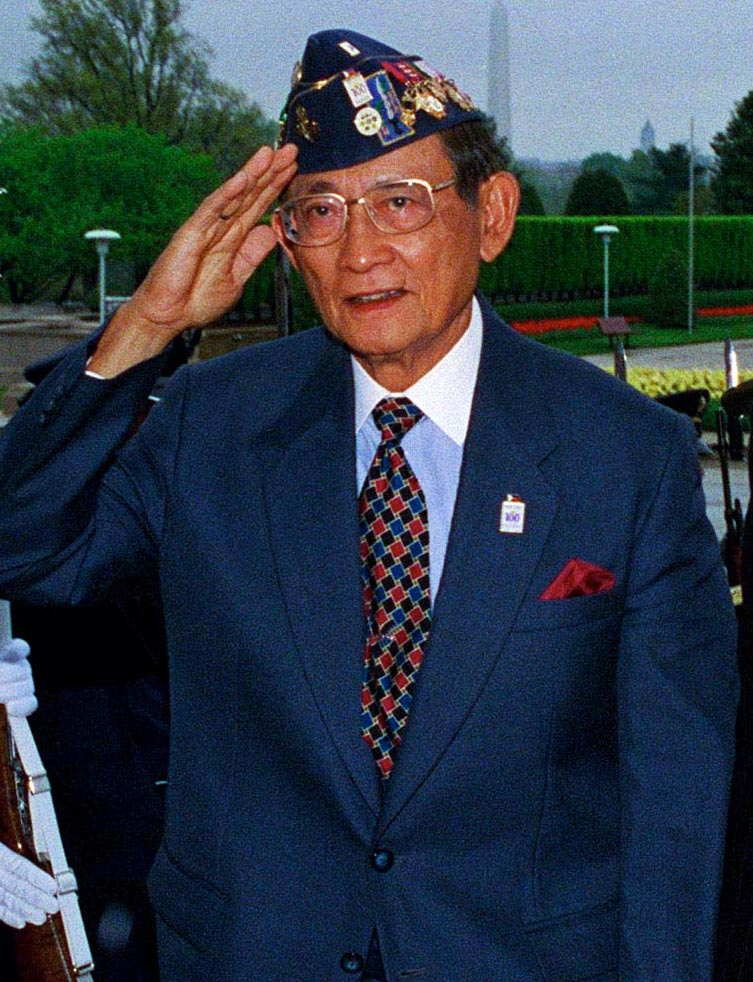
Fidel V. Ramos

- Creighton Abrams, class of 1936, Corps Chief of Staff, Korean War. In 1980, the United States Army named its then-new main battle tank, the M1 Abrams, after him.
- Arnold W. Braswell, class of 1948
- Mark Wayne Clark, class of 1917
- J. Lawton Collins, class of 1917
- Lawrence Russell Dewey, class of 1924
- James Van Fleet, class of 1915
- Alexander Haig, class of 1947
- William M. Hoge, class of 1916
- Lyman Lemnitzer, class of 1920
- Douglas MacArthur, class of 1903
- Andrew P. O'Meara, class of 1930
- Ralph Puckett, class of 1949, Commander of 8th Army Ranger Company
- Fidel V. Ramos, class of 1950, Platoon leader of the 20th Battalion Combat Team, Philippine Expeditionary Forces to Korea
- Matthew Ridgway, class of 1917
- Davis C. Rohr, class of 1952
- Edward Rowny, class of 1941
- John F. R. Seitz, class of 1929, Major General, World War 2 combatant, in command of an infantry battalion at Schofield Barracks on the island of Oahu, Hawaii on December 7, 1941
- Maxwell D. Taylor, class of 1922
- Thomas J. H. Trapnell, class of 1927
- William H. Tunner, class of 1928
- Sam S. Walker, class of 1946
- Walton Walker, class of 1912
- Roderick Wetherill, class of 1940. later major general in the Vietnam War

=== Vietnam War combatants ===
- Creighton Abrams, class of 1936, commanded the U.S. Army Military Assistance Command, Vietnam (1968–1972)
- Alfred Judson Force Moody, class of 1941, Brigadier General, died of a heart attack one week after arriving in Vietnam
- George W. Casey Sr., class of 1945, Major General, killed in a helicopter crash in Vietnam
- Anderson W. Atkinson, class of 1946
- Richard J. Tallman, class of 1949, Brigadier General; killed by North Vietnamese artillery fire, last US Army General to die in South Vietnam.
- Peter J. Boylan, class of 1961
- Wesley Clark, class of 1966
- Harry Griffith Cramer Jr., class of 1946
- Eugene Peyton Deatrick, class of 1946
- Jack K. Farris, class of 1957
- Alexander Haig, class of 1947
- Paul D. Harkins, class of 1929
- Harold Keith Johnson, class of 1933
- Nicholas S. H. Krawciw, class of 1959
- Barry McCaffrey, class of 1964
- Montgomery Meigs, class of 1967
- Hal Moore, class of 1945, commanded 1st Battalion, 7th Cavalry Regiment in the Ia Drang Valley (1965)
- Joseph J. Nazzaro, class of 1936
- Robin Olds, class of 1943
- George Patton IV, class of 1946
- Ralph Puckett, class of 1949, Commander 2d Battalion, 502d Infantry (Airborne), 101st Airborne Division
- Fidel V. Ramos, class of 1950, Chief of Staff of the Philippine Military Contingent and Civil Action Group to Vietnam (1965–1968)
- Davis C. Rohr, class of 1952
- Hoyt S. Vandenberg Jr., class of 1951
- Sam S. Walker, class of 1946
- William Westmoreland

=== Gulf War combatants ===
| Name | Class year | Notability | References |
|---|---|---|---|
| Norman Schwarzkopf Jr. | 1956 | General; Commander-in-Chief, U.S. Central Command; father Norman Schwarzkopf Sr. is a 1917 Academy alumnus | |
| Frederick M. Franks Jr. | 1959 | General; commander, VII Corps and the "Left Hook" maneuver against fourteen Iraqi divisions | |
| Barry McCaffrey | 1964 | General; commander of 24th Infantry Division | |
| Montgomery Meigs | 1967 | General; Vietnam War, Gulf War, and Operation Joint Endeavor; commander 3rd Infantry Division (1995–1996); commander NATO SFOR (1998–1999); professor of strategy and military operations; Major General Montgomery C. Meigs, class of 1836, is his ancestor | |
| H. R. McMaster | 1984 | Major general; captain in 2nd Armored Cavalry Regiment at the Battle of 73 Easting; military history professor at West Point (1994–1996); PhD from the University of North Carolina at Chapel Hill, with a thesis criticizing American strategy in the Vietnam War and detailed in his 1998 book Dereliction of Duty; commander of 3rd Armored Cavalry Regiment in the Iraq War | |
| Mark T. Esper | 1986 | Captain in 3-187 Infantry, 101st Airborne Division, Operations Desert Shield and Desert Storm; Commander, B/3-325 ABCT, Vicenza, Italy (1993-94); War Planner, DCSOPS, U.S. Army Staff, The Pentagon (1995-96); 23rd Secretary of the Army (2017-19); 27th Secretary of Defense (2019-2020) | |

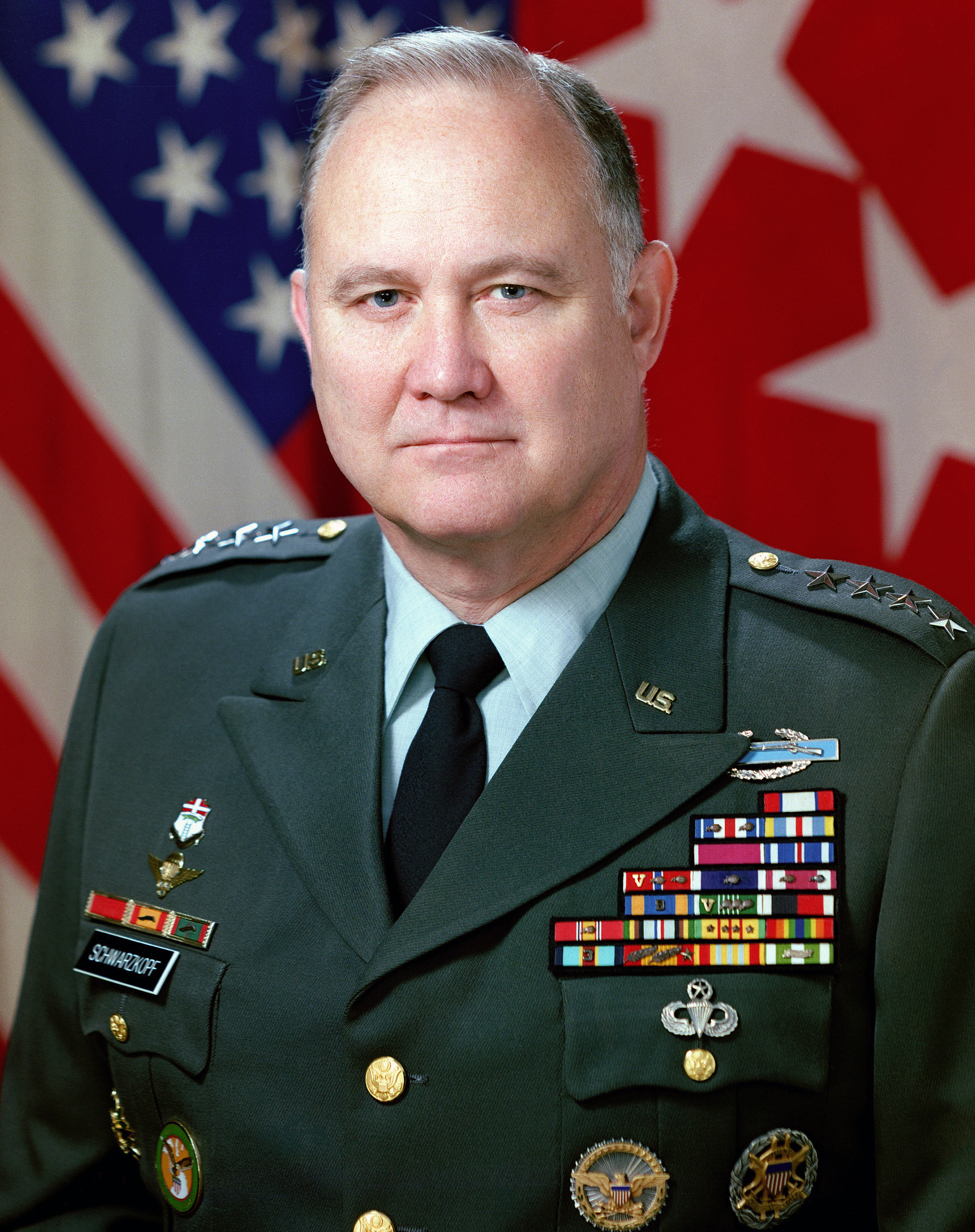
Norman Schwarzkopf Jr.

Barry McCaffrey

=== War on Terror ===
==== Participants ====
| Name | Class year | Notability | References |
|---|---|---|---|
| Wayne A. Downing | 1962 | National Director and Deputy National Security Adviser for combating terrorism; chairman of the Combating Terrorism Center at the Academy | |
| Robert L. Caslen | 1975 | Lieutenant general; chief of staff for Combined Joint Task Force-180 (CJTF-180) in Afghanistan (May–September 2002); Chief of the Office of Security Cooperation for Iraq; 59th Superintendent of the United States Military Academy (2013–2018) | |
| Stanley A. McChrystal | 1976 | Lieutenant General; infantry and special operations officer; served in Iraq and Afghanistan; commander, Joint Special Operations Command (2003–2008) | |
| Robert B. Abrams | 1982 | General. commanding general of the 3rd Infantry Division at Fort Stewart, Georgia from 2011 to 2013, during which he served as commander of Regional Command South in Kandahar, Afghanistan. 22nd Commander of United States Army Forces Command, at Fort Bragg, North Carolina, from Aug 2015 until October 2018. | |
| Richard D. Clarke | 1984 | General; commander 75th Ranger Regiment (2007–2009); 74th Commandant of Cadets (2012–2014); 12th commander of United States Special Operations Command (2019-2022) | |
| Michael Kurilla | 1988 | General. commander of the 82nd Airborne Division from 2016–2018; commander of the XVIII Airborne Corps | |
| Joseph P. McGee | 1990 | Lieutenant General. Commanding General of the 101st Airborne Division, 2021–2023. | |
| Charles Costanza | 1991 | Lieutenant General who served as the commanding general of V Corps from April 8, 2024, until his early removal from command in August 2026. He previously served as the commanding general of the 3rd Infantry Division from 2021 to 2023. He also served as deputy chief of staff for operations, plans and training of United States Army Forces Command from June 2020 to June 2021, deputy commanding general for support of the 1st Armored Division from June 2017 to June 2018, and commander of the 3rd Armored Brigade Combat Team, 3rd Infantry Division, from May 2013 to May 2015. | |
| John B. Richardson IV | 1991 | Retired United States Army major general. He served as Commanding General of the 1st Cavalry Division from July 2021 to July 2023. | |
| Sean Bernabe | 1992 | Lieutenant General. Commanding General of III Corps at Fort Hood, Texas. Commanding General, 1st Armored Division and Fort Bliss, Fort Bliss, Texas, | |
| Christopher Donahue | 1992 | General. Commanding General, 82nd Airborne Division from 2020 to 2021; last American servicemember to leave Afghanistan (August 30, 2021), closing at the same time Operation Allies Refuge, the 2021 evacuation from Afghanistan and the withdrawal of United States troops from Afghanistan. Commanding general of the XVIII Airborne Corps (2022–2024). Commanding General, United States Army Europe and Africa (2024–present). | |
| Brett Sylvia | 1994 | Lieutenant General. Commander of the 101st Airborne Division, July 2023 – May 2025. | |
| J. Patrick Work | 1995 | Major General. Commander of the 82nd Airborne Division, 17 November 2023 - 28 August 2025. | |

==== Afghanistan combatants ====
| Name | Class year | Notability | References |
|---|---|---|---|
| Franklin L. Hagenbeck | 1971 | Lieutenant general; commander, Coalition Joint Task Force Mountain, Operations Enduring Freedom/Anaconda and deputy commanding general, Combined Joint Task Force 180 in Afghanistan; Superintendent of the Academy (2006–2010) | |
| Lloyd J. Austin III | 1975 | General; Commander, 10th Mountain Division (2003–2005) and Combined Joint Task Force-180 (Operation Enduring Freedom) (2003–2004) | |
| Robert W. Cone | 1979 | Major general; commander, Combined Security Transition Command – Afghanistan | |
| Austin S. Miller | 1983 | four-star general in the United States Army and former Delta Force commander who served as the final commander of NATO's Resolute Support Mission and United States Forces - Afghanistan from September 2, 2018, to July 12, 2021. He previously served as the commander of Joint Special Operations Command from March 30, 2016, to August 2018. | |
| Robin Fontes | 1986 | Major general; commander, Combined Security Transition Command – Afghanistan | |
| Erica Vandal | 2011 | Major; artillery commander, Bronze Star Medal recipient | |

==== Iraq combatants ====
| Name | Class year | Notability | References |
|---|---|---|---|
| John Abizaid | 1973 | General; commander, United States Central Command; commander 3rd Battalion, 325th Airborne Battalion Combat Team; commander 504th Parachute Infantry Regiment | |
| David Petraeus | 1974 | General; first commander of the Multi-National Security Transition Command – Iraq and the NATO Training Mission-Iraq; commander 101st Airborne Division; commander Multi-National Forces – Iraq (2007-) | |
| Lloyd J. Austin III | 1975 | General; 28th United States Secretary of Defense; Commander, United States Central Command; 33rd Vice Chief of Staff, Army; Commander, United States Forces-Iraq (2010–2011); Commander, XVIIIth Airborne Corps (2006–2008) and Multi-National Corps-Iraq (2008–2009); ADC(M), 3rd Infantry Division (Mechanized) (2001–2003); Silver Star recipient | |
| William B. Caldwell IV | 1976 | Lieutenant general; deputy chief of staff for strategic effects and spokesman for Multinational Force Iraq | |
| Mark Kimmitt | 1976 | Brigadier general; chief military spokesman for the Coalition Provisional Authority in Baghdad (2003–2004); Assistant Secretary of State for Political-Military Affairs (2008–2009) | |
| Charles T. Cleveland | 1978 | Lieutenant General. Served as commanding officer of the 10th Special Forces Group from 2001 to 2003, leading the initial invasion into northern Iraq during Operation Iraqi Freedom. He also served as Chief of Staff, and as Deputy Commander of the Army Special Operations Command followed by duty commander of Special Operations Command South from 2005 to 2008. Cleveland served as commander of Special Operations Command Central from 2008 to 2011. Commander of the United States Army Special Operations Command from 2012 to 2015. | |
| James H. Coffman Jr. | 1978 | Colonel; Distinguished Service Cross for action at Mosul, Iraq | |
| Peter Mansoor | 1982 | Colonel. He is known primarily as the executive officer to General David Petraeus during the Iraq War, particularly the Iraq War troop surge of 2007. | |
| H. R. McMaster | 1984 | Major General | |
| Emily Perez | 2005 | Second Lieutenant; first member of the "Class of 9/11" to be killed in combat | |

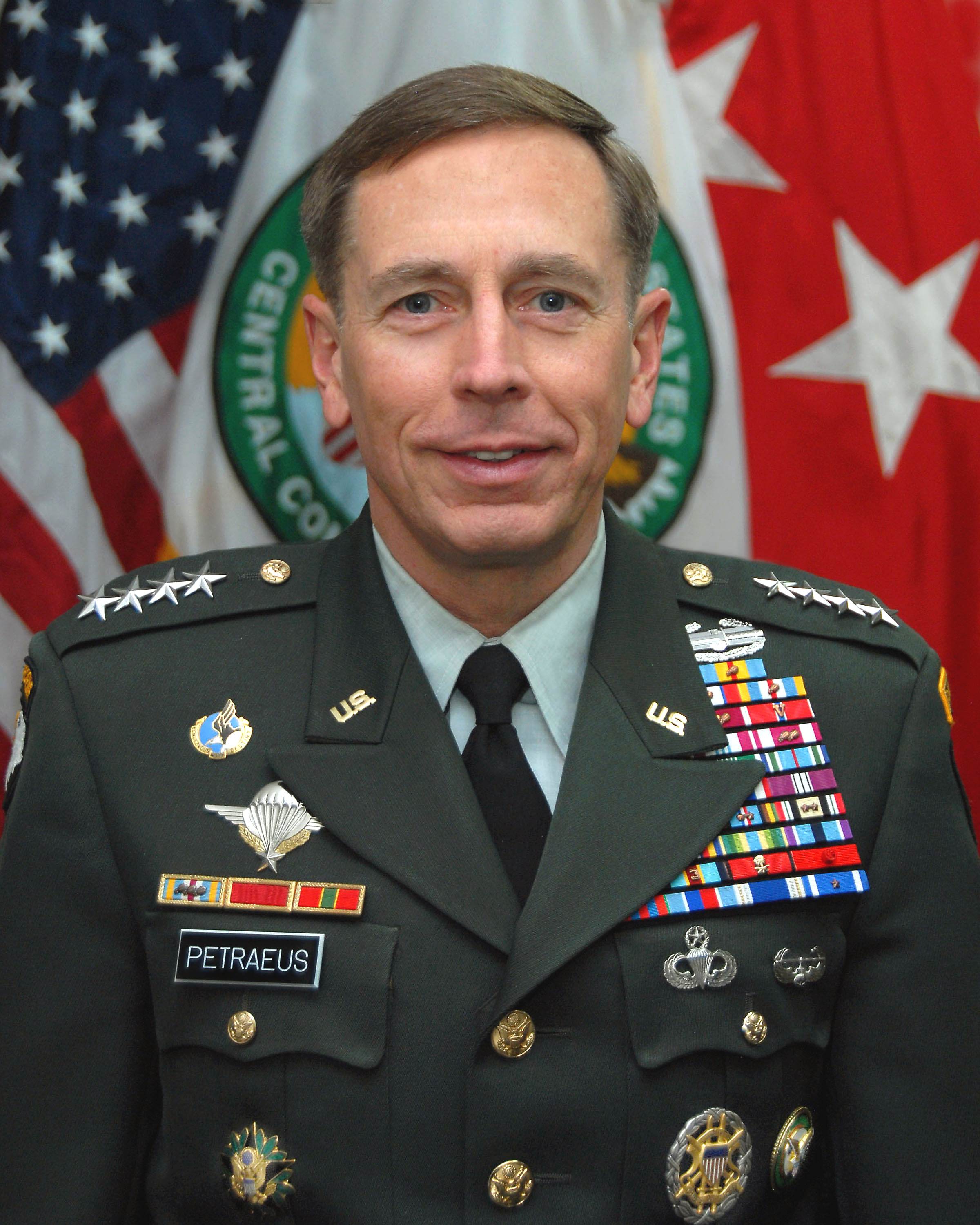
David Petraeus

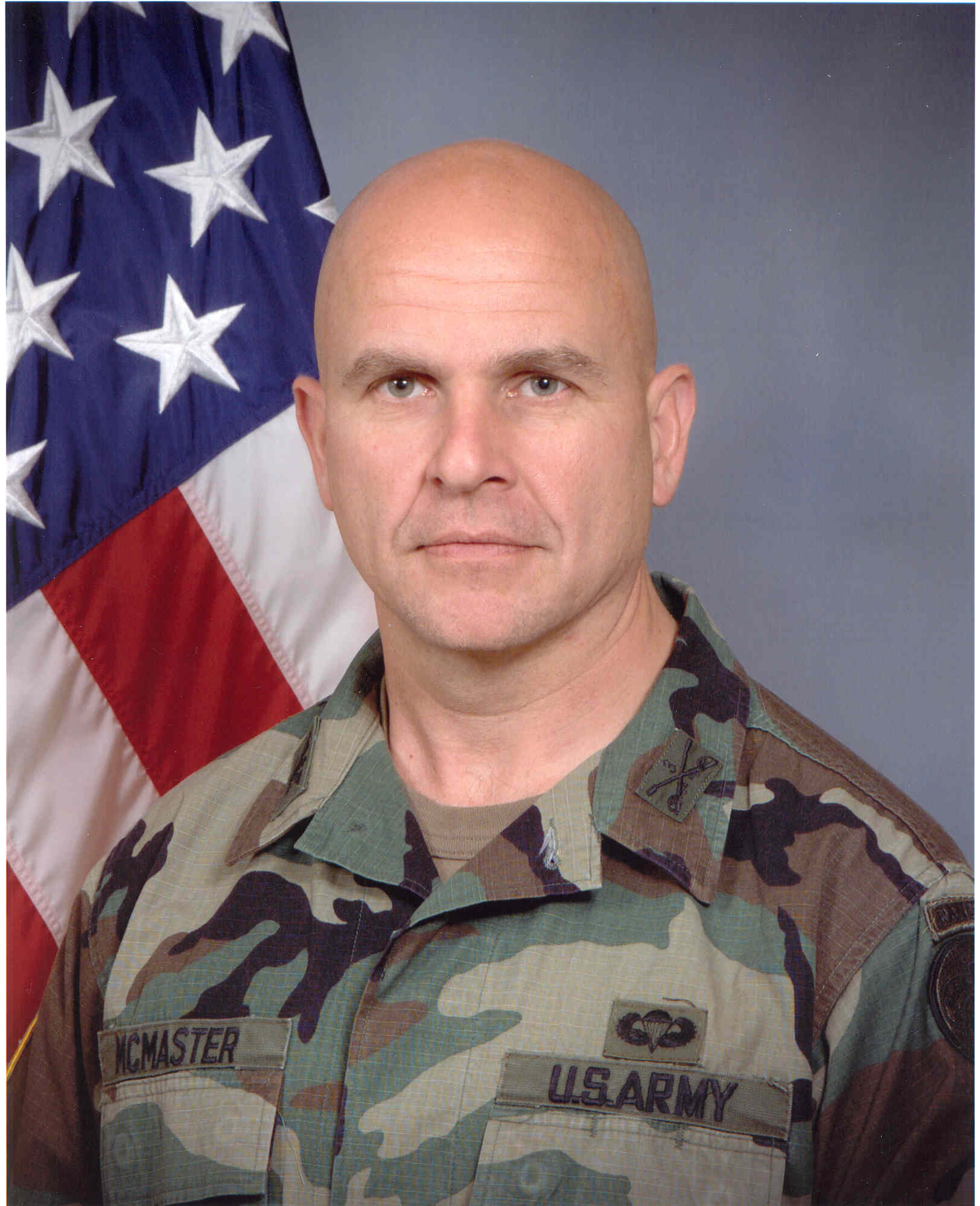
H. R. McMaster

=== Five-Star Generals ===
| Portrait | Name | Position | Date of rank |
|---|---|---|---|
| | Douglas MacArthur; Class of 1903 | Supreme Commander – Southwest Pacific Area | 18 December 1944 |
| | Dwight D. Eisenhower; Class of 1915 | Supreme Commander – Europe | 20 December 1944 |
| | Henry H. Arnold; Class of 1907 | Commander of the US Army Air Forces | 21 December 1944 |
| | Omar Bradley; Class of 1915 | Chairman of the Joint Chiefs of Staff; Chairman of the NATO Military Committee | 22 September 1950 |

=== Commanders of Army Service Component Commands ===
==== United States Army Cyber Command ====
- Rhett A. Hernandez - class of 1976, 1st Commanding General of ARCYBER, October 1, 2010 – September 3, 2013.
- Edward C. Cardon - class of 1982, 2nd Commanding General of ARCYBER, September 3, 2013 – October 14, 2016.

=== Commanders of Unified Combatant Commands ===
==== Commanders of United States Central Command ====
- Norman Schwarzkopf Jr. - class of 1956, 3rd Commander of CENTCOM, November 23, 1988 – August 9, 1991.
- John Abizaid - class of 1973, 8th Commander of CENTCOM, July 7, 2003 – March 16, 2007.
- Martin Dempsey - class of 1974, Acting Commander of CENTCOM, March 28 – October 31, 2008.
- David Petraeus - class of 1974, 10th Commander of CENTCOM, October 31, 2008 – June 30, 2010.
- Lloyd Austin - class of 1975, 12th Commander of CENTCOM, March 22, 2013 – March 30, 2016.
- Joseph Votel - class of 1980, 13th Commander of CENTCOM, March 30, 2016 – March 28, 2019.
- Michael Kurilla - class of 1988, 15th Commander of CENTCOM, April 1, 2022 – August 8, 2025.

==== Commanders of United States Cyber Command ====
- Keith B. Alexander - class of 1974, 1st Commander of USCYBERCOM, May 21, 2010 – March 28, 2014.

==== Commanders of United States European Command ====
- Matthew Ridgway - class of 1917, 1st Commander of EUCOM, May 30, 1952 – July 11, 1953.
- Alfred Gruenther - class of 1919, 2nd Commander of EUCOM, July 11, 1953 – November 20, 1956.
- Lyman Lemnitzer - class of 1920, 4th Commander of EUCOM, November 1, 1962 – July 1, 1969.
- Andrew Goodpaster - class of 1939, 5th Commander of EUCOM, July 1, 1969 – December 15, 1974.
- Alexander Haig - class of 1947, 6th Commander of EUCOM, December 15, 1974 – July 1, 1979.
- Bernard W. Rogers, class of 1943, 7th Commander of EUCOM, July 1, 1979 – June 26, 1987.
- John Galvin - class of 1954, 8th Commander of EUCOM, June 26, 1987 – June 23, 1992.
- George Joulwan - class of 1961, 10th Commander of EUCOM, October 22, 1993 – July 11, 1997.
- Wesley Clark - class of 1966, 11th Commander of EUCOM, July 11, 1997 – May 3, 2000.
- Curtis Scaparrotti - class of 1978, 17th Commander of EUCOM, May 4, 2016 – May 3, 2019.

==== Commanders of United States Special Operations Command ====
- Wayne A. Downing - class of 1962, 3rd Commander of USSOCOM, May 20, 1993 – February 29, 1996.
- Joseph Votel - class of 1980, 10th Commander of USSOCOM, August 28, 2014 – March 30, 2016.
- Raymond A. Thomas III - class of 1980, 11th Commander of USSOCOM, March 30, 2016 – March 29, 2019.
- Richard D. Clarke - class of 1984, 12th Commander of USSOCOM, March 29, 2019 – August 30, 2022.

=== Supreme Allied Commanders of NATO ===
- Dwight Eisenhower, class of 1915
- Lyman Lemnitzer, class of 1922
- Andrew Goodpaster, class of 1939
- Bernard W. Rogers, class of 1943
- Alexander Haig, class of 1947
- John Galvin, class of 1954
- George Joulwan, class of 1961
- Wesley Clark, class of 1966
- Curtis M. Scaparrotti, class of 1978

=== Chairmen of the Joint Chiefs of Staff ===
- Omar N. Bradley, class of 1915, CJCS, 1949–1953
- Nathan F. Twining, class of 1919, CJCS, 1957–1960
- Lyman L. Lemnitzer, class of 1920, CJCS, 1960–1962
- Maxwell D. Taylor, class of 1922, CJCS, 1962–1964
- Earle G. Wheeler, class of 1932, CJCS, 1964–1970
- George Scratchley Brown, U.S. Air Force, class of 1941, CJCS, 1974–1978
- Martin E. Dempsey, class of 1974, CJCS, 2011–2015

=== Army Chiefs of Staff/Commanders of the Army ===
- George B. McClellan, class of 1846, Commanding General of the Army (1861–1862)
- Henry Wager Halleck, class of 1839, Commanding General of the Army (1862–1864)
- Ulysses S. Grant, class of 1843, Commanding General of the Army (1864–1869)
- William Tecumseh Sherman, class of 1840, Commanding General of the Army (1869–1883)
- Philip Sheridan, class of 1853, Commanding General of the Army (1883–1888)
- John Schofield, class of 1853, Commanding General of the Army (1888–1895)
- J. Franklin Bell, class of 1878, 4th U.S. Army Chief of Staff (1906–1910)
- Hugh L. Scott, class of 1876, 7th U.S. Army Chief of Staff (1914–1917)
- Tasker H. Bliss, class of 1875, 8th U.S. Army Chief of Staff (1917–1918)
- Peyton C. March, class of 1888, 9th U.S. Army Chief of Staff (1918–1921)
- John Pershing, class of 1886, 10th U.S. Army Chief of Staff (1921–1924)
- John L. Hines, class of 1891, 11th U.S. Army Chief of Staff (1924–1926)
- Charles Pelot Summerall, class of 1892, 12th U.S. Army Chief of Staff (1926–1930)
- Douglas MacArthur, class of 1903, 13th U.S. Army Chief of Staff (1930–1935)
- Malin Craig, class of 1898, 14th U.S. Army Chief of Staff (1935–1939)
- Dwight D. Eisenhower, class of 1915, 16th U.S. Army Chief of Staff (1945–1948)
- Omar Bradley, class of 1915, 17th U.S. Army Chief of Staff (1948–1949)
- J. Lawton Collins, class of 1917, 18th U.S. Army Chief of Staff (1949–1953)
- Matthew Ridgway, class of 1917, 19th U.S. Army Chief of Staff (1953–1955)
- Maxwell D. Taylor, class of 1922, 20th U.S. Army Chief of Staff (1955–1959)
- Lyman Lemnitzer, class of 1920, 21st U.S. Army Chief of Staff (1959–1960)
- Earle Wheeler, class of 1932, 23rd U.S. Army Chief of Staff (1962–1964)
- Harold Keith Johnson, class of 1933, 24th U.S. Army Chief of Staff (1964–1968)

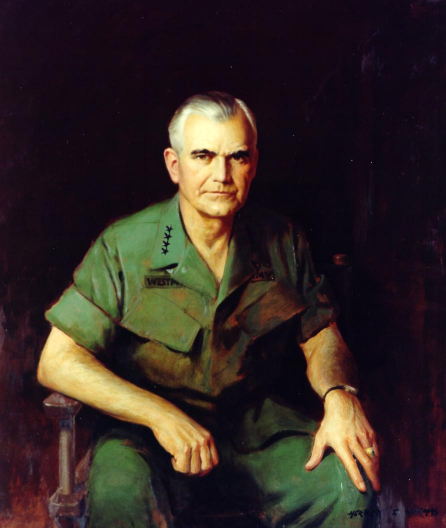
William Westmoreland, class of 1936

- William Westmoreland, class of 1936, 25th U.S. Army Chief of Staff (1968–1972)
- Bruce Palmer Jr., class of 1936, Acting U.S. Army Chief of Staff (1972)
- Creighton Abrams, class of 1936, 26th U.S. Army Chief of Staff (1972–1974)
- Bernard W. Rogers, class of 1943, 28th U.S. Army Chief of Staff (1976–1979)
- Edward C. Meyer, class of 1951, 29th U.S. Army Chief of Staff (1979–1983)
- John Wickham, class of 1950, 30th U.S. Army Chief of Staff (1983–1987)
- Carl E. Vuono, class of 1957, 31st U.S. Army Chief of Staff (1987–1991)
- Dennis Reimer, class of 1962, 33rd U.S. Army Chief of Staff (1995–1999)
- Eric Shinseki, class of 1965, 34th U.S. Army Chief of Staff (1999–2003)
- Martin E. Dempsey, class of 1974, 37th U.S. Army Chief of Staff (2011)
- Raymond T. Odierno, class of 1976, 38th U.S. Army Chief of Staff (2011–2015)
- James C. McConville, class of 1981, 40th US. Army Chief of Staff (2019–2023)
- Randy A. George, class of 1988, 41st U.S. Army Chief of Staff (2023-2026)

=== Chiefs of the National Guard Bureau / Chiefs of the Militia Bureau ===
- Erasmus M. Weaver Jr., class of 1875, 1st Chief of the Militia Bureau (1908-1911)
- Robert K. Evans, class of 1875, 2nd Chief of the Militia Bureau (1911-1912)
- Albert Leopold Mills, class of 1879, 3rd Chief of the Militia Bureau (1912-1916), Medal of Honor recipient in the Spanish-American War (Battle of San Juan Hill)
- George W. McIver, class of 1882, acting Chief of the Militia Bureau (September–October 1916)
- William Abram Mann, class of 1875, 4th Chief of the Militia Bureau (1916-1917)
- Jesse McI. Carter, class of 1886, 5th Chief of the Militia Bureau (1917-1918 and 1919-1921)
- John W. Heavey, class of 1891, acting Chief of the Militia Bureau (1918-1919)
- Donald W. McGowan, attended 1919-1922, 16th Chief of the National Guard Bureau (1959-1963)
- Raymond F. Rees, class of 1966, acting Chief of the National Guard Bureau (August–September 1994 and 2002-2003)
- Daniel R. Hokanson, class of 1986, 29th Chief of the National Guard Bureau (2020–present)

=== Chiefs of the Army Corps of Engineers ===
The Chief of Engineers also commands the United States Army Corps of Engineers. As commander of the US Army Corps of Engineers, the Chief of Engineers leads a major Army command that is the world's largest public engineering, design, and construction management agency.

- Frederick J. Clarke - class of 1937, 41st Chief of Engineers and commanding general of the United States Army Corps of Engineers (1969-1973)
- William C. Gribble Jr. - class of 1941, 42nd Chief of Engineers (1973-1976)
- John W. Morris - class of 1943 (June), 43rd Chief of Engineers (1976-1980)
- Joseph K. Bratton - class of 1948, 44th Chief of Engineers (1980-1984)
- Elvin R. Heiberg III - class of 1953, 45th Chief of Engineers (1984-1988)
- Henry J. Hatch - class of 1957, 46th Chief of Engineers (1988-1992)
- Robert L. Van Antwerp Jr. - class of 1972, First Captain of the Corps of Cadets, 51st Chief of Engineers (2007-2011)
- Thomas P. Bostick - class of 1978, 53rd Chief of Engineers (2012-2016)
- Todd T. Semonite - class of 1979, 54th Chief of Engineers (2016-2020)
- Scott A. Spellmon - class of 1986, 55th Chief of Engineers (2020-2024)

=== Air Force Chiefs of Staff ===
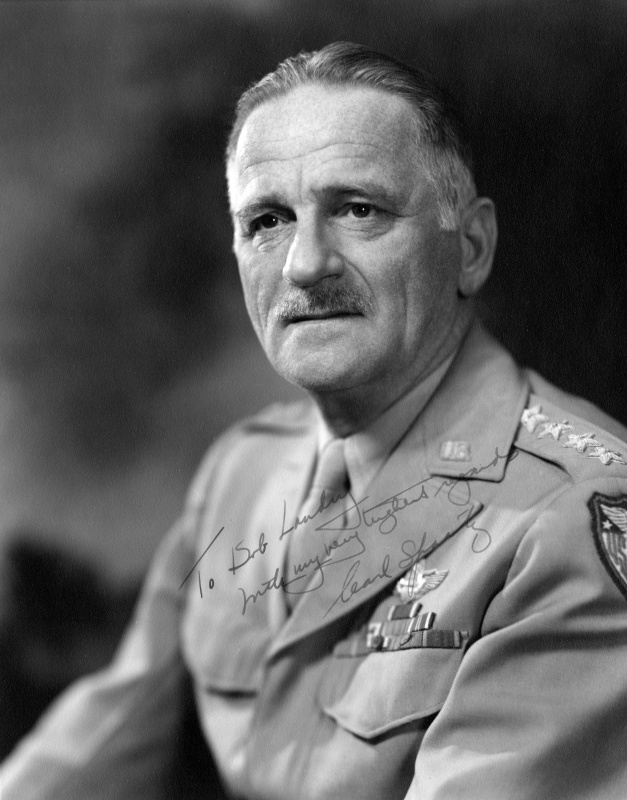
Carl Spaatz, class of 1914

- Carl Spaatz, class of 1914, 1st USAF Chief of Staff (1947–1948)
- Nathan Farragut Twining, class of 1918, 3rd USAF Chief of Staff (1953–1957)
- Thomas D. White, class of 1920, 4th USAF Chief of Staff (1957–1961)
- John P. McConnell, class of 1932, 6th USAF Chief of Staff (1965–1969)
- John Dale Ryan, class of 1938, 7th USAF Chief of Staff (1969–1973)
- George Scratchley Brown, class of 1941, USAF Chief of Staff (1973–1974)
- Lew Allen, class of 1946, 10th USAF Chief of Staff (1978–1982)
- Charles A. Gabriel, class of 1950, 11th USAF Chief of Staff (1982–1986)
- Michael Dugan, class of 1958, 13th USAF Chief of Staff (1990)

=== Chief of Staff of non-American armed forces ===
- Douglas MacArthur, class of 1903, Field Marshal of the Armed Forces of the Philippines (1935–1946)
- Fidel V. Ramos, class of 1950, Chief of Staff of the Armed Forces of the Philippines (1986–1988)

=== Surgeon General of the United States Army ===
- James B. Peake - class of 1966, 40th Surgeon General of the United States Army, September 22, 2000 – July 8, 2004.
- Nadja Y. West - class of 1982, 44th Surgeon General of the United States Army, December 11, 2015 – August 16, 2019.

== Presidential and Congressional awardees ==
=== Presidential Medal of Freedom recipients ===
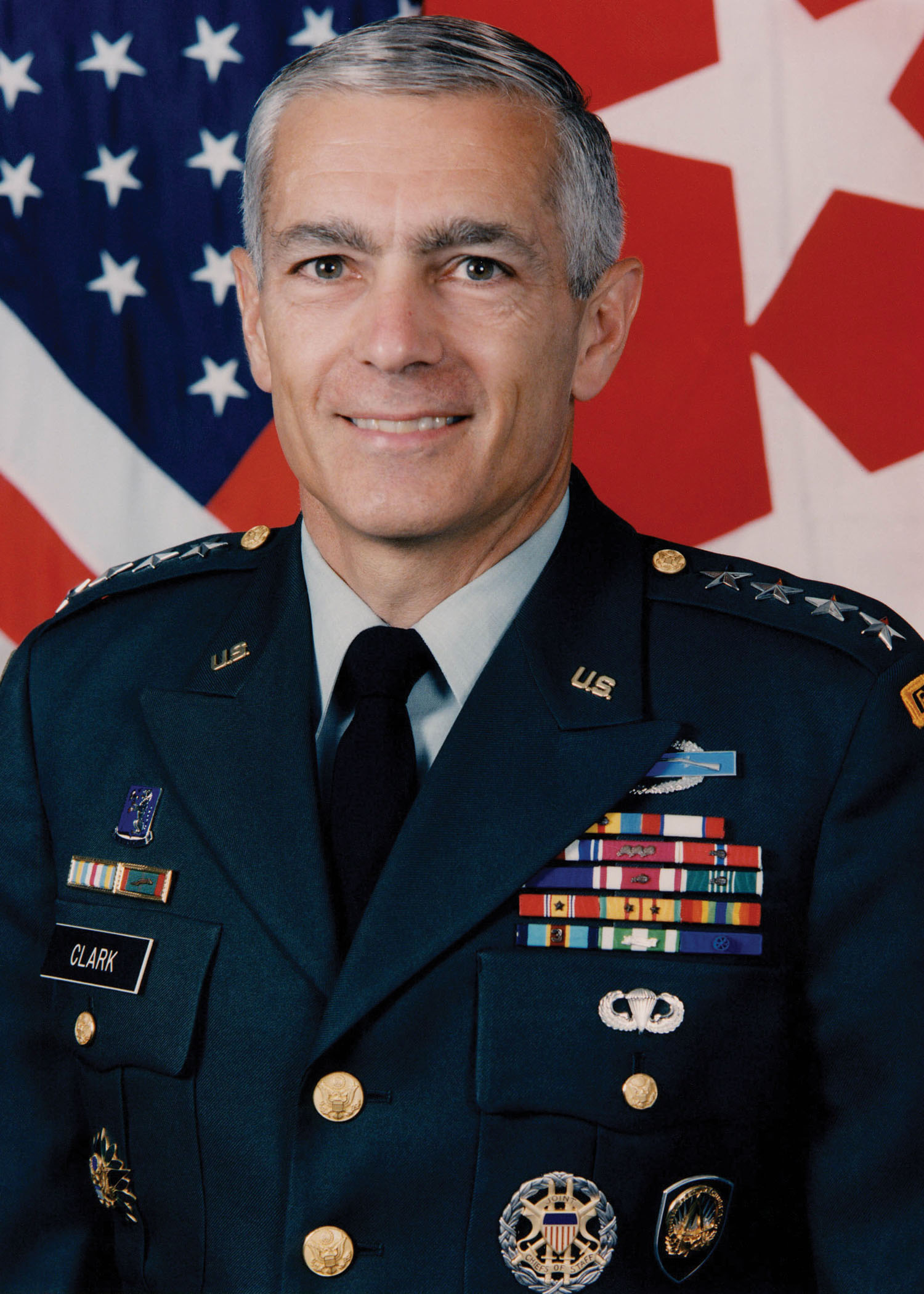
Wesley Clark, class of 1966

- Brent Scowcroft, class of 1947, medal awarded in 1991
- Buzz Aldrin
- Michael Collins
- Omar Bradley
- Wesley Clark
- Norman Schwarzkopf Jr.
- Earl Blaik

=== Congressional Gold Medal recipients ===
- Ulysses S. Grant
- John J. Pershing
- Douglas MacArthur
- Matthew Ridgway
- Norman Schwarzkopf Jr.

=== Congressional Space Medal of Honor recipients ===
- Frank Borman
- Ed White

== Religious figures ==
- Paul K. Hurley, class of 1984, 24th Chief of Chaplains of the US Army (2015-2019)

== Scientists, inventors, and physicians ==
- Benjamin Alvord, class of 1833, mathematician
- Seth Barton, class of 1849 (USA and CSA), chemist
- George Bomford, class of 1805, inventor of ordnance and explosives; standardized army usage as Chief of the Ordnance Department
- John James Abert, class of 1811, head topographer for the U.S. Army; his officers mapped the American West under his supervision
- Benjamin Bonneville, class of 1815, organized expedition that explored the Great Salt Lake, crossed the Sierras, found the headwaters of the Yellowstone and discovered the Humboldt River
- George Washington Whistler, class of 1819, invented contour lines on maps, father of James McNeill Whistler, the artist, husband of "Whistler's Mother"
- Robert Parker Parrott, class of 1824, invented the Parrott rifle used extensively during the American Civil War
- Ormsby M. Mitchel, class of 1825, astronomer
- Henry du Pont, class of 1833, improved the production of gunpowder, chemicals industry pioneer. Father of Henry A. du Pont, class of 1861, and Medal of Honor recipient
- Thomas Jackson Rodman, class of 1841, inventor of the Rodman gun
- William W. Averell, class of 1855, inventor of asphalt
- John Wilson Ruckman, class of 1883, inventor of artillery devices critical in World War I
- George O. Squier, class of 1887, developer of Muzak, early radio engineer
- Leslie Groves, class of 1918, chief engineer for the Manhattan Project and the Pentagon
- Edward A. Murphy Jr., class of 1940, credited with the invention of Murphy's Law
- Peter Huybers, class of 1996, MacArthur Foundation Grant awardee ("Genius Grant"), planetary and climate scientist, currently a professor at Harvard
- John T. Thompson, class of 1882, inventor of the Thompson submachine gun
- Edward S. Holden, class of 1870, astronomer, librarian at West Point, 5th president of the University of California, Founder, Lick observatory
- Isaac Newton Lewis, class of 1884, inventor of the Lewis gun

== Graduates involved with the Manhattan Project ==
| Name | Class year | Notability | References |
|---|---|---|---|
| Leslie Groves | 1918 | Lieutenant General. United States Army Corps of Engineers officer who oversaw the construction of the Pentagon and directed the Manhattan Project. | |
| Kenneth David Nichols | 1929 | Major General. Civil engineer who worked on the Manhattan Project. Arranged the procurement of uranium ore for the Manhattan Project. Nichols led both the uranium production facility at the Clinton Engineer Works at Oak Ridge, Tennessee, and the plutonium production facility at Hanford Engineer Works in Washington state. Plutonium manufactured at Hanford was used in the first atomic bomb, which was tested in the Trinity nuclear test, and in the Fat Man bomb used in the bombing of Nagasaki. | |
| James Benjamin Lampert | 1936 | Lieutenant general; combat engineer during World War II; early pioneer of nuclear weapons and nuclear power, served as General Leslie Groves' executive officer as part of the Manhattan Project after World War II (1947-1949); his father, James G. B. Lampert, class of 1910, was killed in World War I. | |
| Peer de Silva | 1941 | Lieutenant Colonel. Posted to Military Intelligence, in 1942 he completed the Army's advanced school for the counterintelligence corps. Then serving as an Army officer in charge of security, he provided protection for scientists and technicians in the Manhattan Project. He personally escorted the plutonium hemispheres that formed the core of the Fat Man nuclear weapon to Tinian, the island in the western Pacific from which the raid on Nagasaki was staged. On the island, only hours before Bockscar took off for Japan, the hemispheres—called the "pit", on analogy with the seed of a stonefruit—were inserted into the center of their nuclear weapon. | |

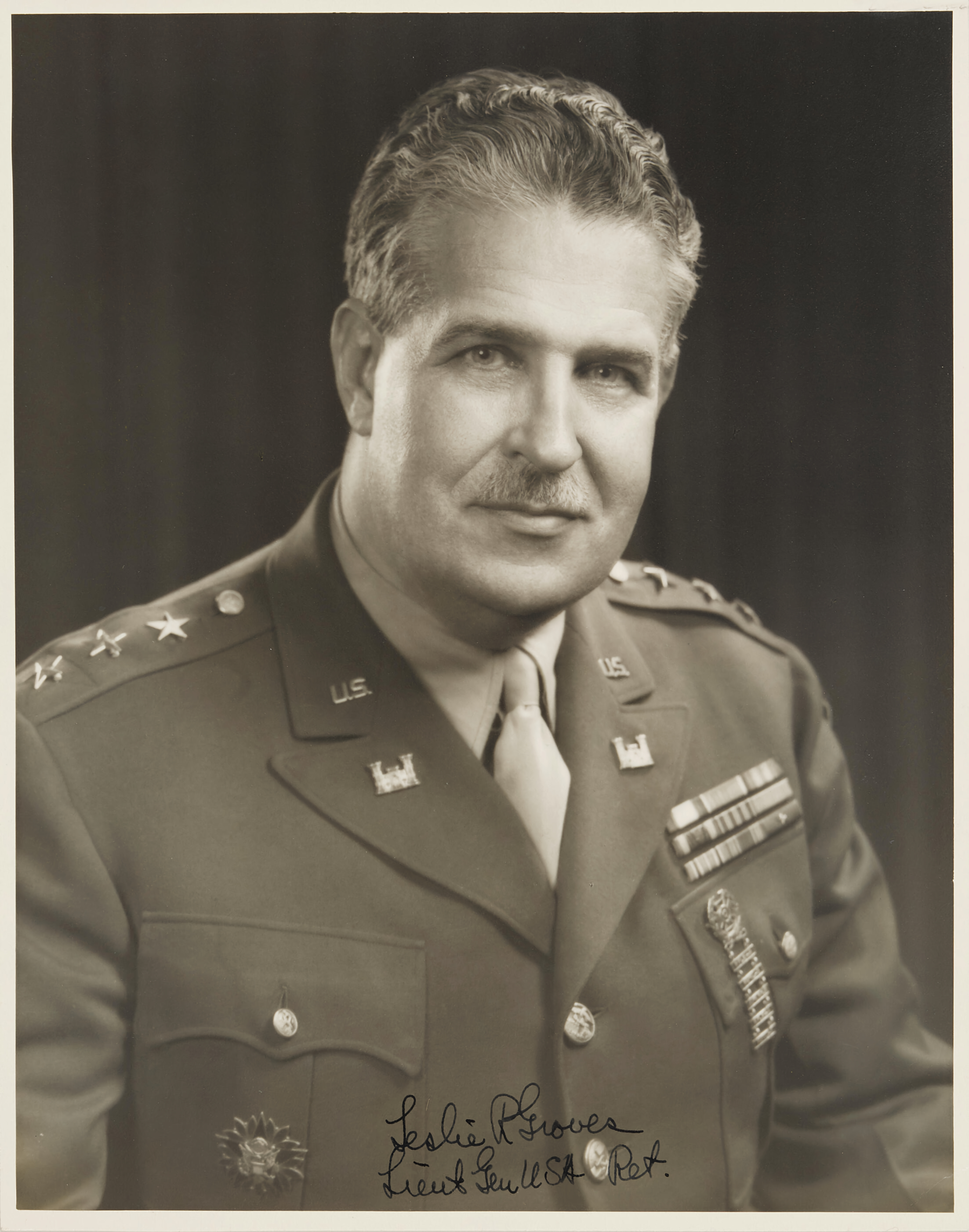
Leslie Groves

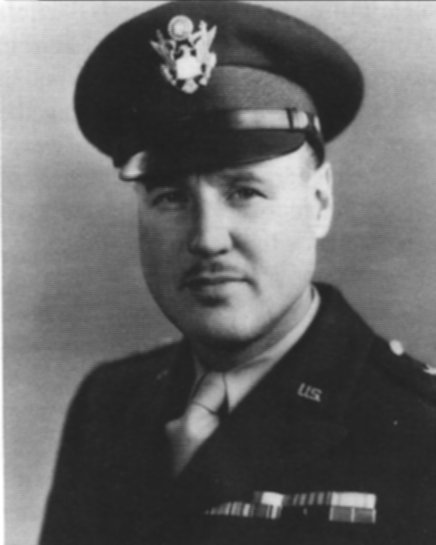
Kennth D. Nichols

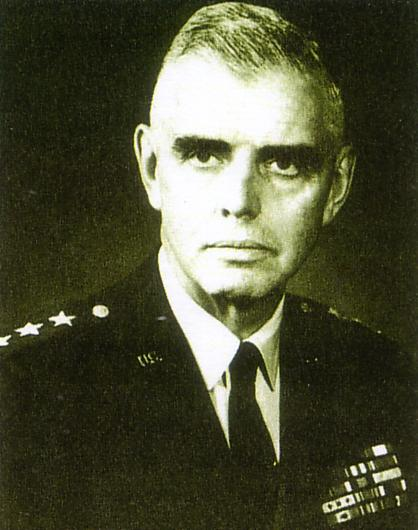
James B. Lampert

== Sportspeople ==
=== Athletes ===
| Name | Class year | Notability | References |
|---|---|---|---|
| Abner Doubleday | 1842 | Major General during the American Civil War; subject of the myth that he invented baseball | |
| Guy Henry | 1898 | Major General; Spanish–American War, Philippine–American War, World War I, World War II; commander of the 3rd Cavalry Regiment; recipient of two Army Distinguished Service Medals and the Silver Star; son of Brigadier General, Medal of Honor recipient, and Puerto Rico Governor Guy Vernor Henry; Bronze Medalist at the 1912 Summer Olympics in equestrianism | |
| Paul Bunker | 1903 | Colonel; selected as a member of the College Football All-America Team in 1901 and 1902 and as the retroactive Heisman Trophy winner for 1902 by Sports Illustrated; member of the College Football Hall of Fame | |
| George S. Patton | 1909 | General; 1912 Summer Olympics, modern pentathlon, 5th place; Pancho Villa Expedition; World War II; Battle of Saint-Mihiel, Meuse-Argonne Offensive; commander of the 1st Tank Brigade/304th Tank Brigade; commander of the 3rd Cavalry Regiment; commander of the 2nd Armored Division; commander of the II Corps; commander of the Seventh United States Army, Third United States Army, and Fifteenth United States Army during World War II; descendant of Brigadier General Hugh Mercer; father of Major General George Patton IV; Patton series of tanks were named for him | |
| Elmer Oliphant | 1918 | World War I; professional football player; considered one of the all-time greatest college football players; established world record in 220-yard (200 m) low hurdles | |
| P.C. Hains | 1924 | Major General; cavalry officer; modern pentathlon at the 1928 Summer Olympics | |
| John Roosma | 1926 | Colonel during World War II; Basketball Hall of Fame; the Academy's basketball Most Valuable Player award is named after him | |
| Robin Olds | 1943 | Brigadier General; World War II, Vietnam War; group commander in the 86th Fighter-Interceptor Wing; commander of the No. 1 Squadron RAF and 434th Fighter Squadron; commander of the 81st Tactical Wing and the 8th Tactical Fighter Wing; recipient of the Air Force Cross, two Air Force Distinguished Service Medals, and four Silver Stars; son of Major General Robert Olds; member of the College Football Hall of Fame | |
| Doc Blanchard | 1947 | United States Air Force fighter pilot; combat veteran of Vietnam War; football player known as "Mr. Inside" who won the Heisman Trophy, Maxwell Award, and James E. Sullivan Award, all in 1945 | |
| Glenn Woodward Davis | 1947 | Served three years in the Army before joining the Los Angeles Rams; football player known as "Mr. Outside" who won the Maxwell Award (1944) and Heisman Trophy (1946) | |
| James V. Hartinger | 1949 | United States Air Force General; fighter pilot; combat veteran of Korean War and Vietnam War; National Lacrosse Hall of Fame inductee; Hartinger Medal for significant contributions to the military space mission named after him | |
| Dan Foldberg | 1951 | Colonel; infantry officer and combat veteran of the Korean War and Vietnam War; football and lacrosse All-American at the Academy; Earl Blaik called him the greatest end he coached; drafted by the Detroit Lions football team but chose a career in the Army instead | |
| Bill Carpenter | 1959 | Lieutenant General; Distinguished Service Cross recipient during the Vietnam War; paratrooper; football player known as the "Lonesome End"; College Football Hall of Fame inductee | |
| Pete Dawkins | 1959 | Brigadier General; Heisman Trophy Maxwell Award winner (1958); Rhodes Scholar; PhD from Princeton University; paratrooper; recipient of two Bronze Stars during the Vietnam War; only cadet in history to simultaneously be Brigade Commander, President of his Class, captain of the football team, and a "Star Man" in the top five percent of his class academically | |
| Ronald Zinn | 1962 | Captain; killed in action in 1965 during the Vietnam War; race walker in the 1960 Summer Olympics and 6th place in racewalking in the 1964 Summer Olympics | |
| Tom Lough | 1964 | Competed in the modern pentathlon in the 1968 Summer Olympics. | . |
| Mike Silliman | 1966 | Captain; gold medal in men's basketball at the 1968 Summer Olympics | |
| Craig Gilbert | 1978 | At the 1984 Summer Olympic Games in Los Angeles, he competed in team handball. Hand the team reached the 9th ranking. He played one game against Denmark. | |
| Michael Thornberry | 1994 | First Lieutenant; ninth place in team handball in the 1996 Summer Olympics | |
| Dan Browne | 1997 | First Lieutenant; professional distance runner; 2002 U.S. Marathon champion; 2004 Summer Olympics competitor at 10 km and marathon | |
| Ronnie McAda | 1997 | First Lieutenant; last pick in the 1997 NFL draft, selected by the Green Bay Packers, thus earning the distinction of being a Mr. Irrelevant | |
| Anita Allen | 2000 | Captain; placed eighteenth in the modern pentathlon at the 2004 Summer Olympics | |
| Lorenzo Smith III | 2000 | Captain; placed sixth in bobsledding at the 2006 Winter Olympics | |
| Boyd Melson | 2003 | Captain; boxer, 2004 World Military Boxing Championships, gold medal (69-kg. weight class) | |
| Caleb Campbell | 2007 | First Lieutenant; selected by the Detroit Lions with the 218th pick (7th round) in the 2008 NFL draft | |
| Alejandro Villanueva | 2010 | Captain; Infantry officer, combat veteran of the War in Afghanistan, and recipient of the Bronze Star with "V" Device; offensive tackle for the Pittsburgh Steelers and Baltimore Ravens | |
| Stewart Glenister | 2011 | West Point cadet; represented American Samoa in 50 m freestyle swimming at the 2008 Summer Olympics | |
| Stephen Scherer | 2011 | West Point cadet; made the U.S. 2008 Summer Olympics team in 10 m air rifle team at the age of 19 as a plebe | |
| Josh McNary | 2011 | First Lieutenant; linebacker for the Indianapolis Colts | |
| Collin Mooney | 2012 | First Lieutenant; fullback who played for the Tennessee Titans and the Atlanta Falcons | |
| Chris Rowley | 2013 | American baseball pitcher for the Toronto Blue Jays of Major League Baseball (MLB). | |
| Brett Toth | 2018 | American football offensive tackle for the Philadelphia Eagles of the National Football League (NFL). | |
| Jon Rosoff | 2018 | American baseball Minor League catcher for the Detroit Tigers of Major League Baseball (MLB). | |
| Cam Opp | 2019 | American baseball Minor League pitcher for the New York Mets of Major League Baseball (MLB) and Great Britain in the World Baseball Classic (WBC). | |
| Cole Christiansen | 2019 | American football linebacker for the Los Angeles Chargers and Kansas City Chiefs of the National Football League (NFL). Super Bowl champion with Kansas City in 2022 and 2023 (LVII) and (LVIII). | |
| Elijah Riley | 2020 | American football defensive back for the Philadelphia Eagles, New York Jets and Pittsburgh Steelers of the National Football League (NFL). | |
| Jacob Hurtubise | 2020 | American baseball outfielder for the Cincinnati Reds of Major League Baseball (MLB). | |
| Jon Rhattigan | 2021 | American football linebacker for the Seattle Seahawks of the National Football League (NFL). | |
| Andre Carter II | 2023 | American football linebacker for the Minnesota Vikings of the National Football League (NFL). | |
| Ross Friedrick | 2023 | American baseball Minor League first baseman for the St. Louis Cardinals of Major League Baseball (MLB). | |
| Jimmy Ciarlo | 2024 | American football linebacker for the New York Jets of the National Football League (NFL). Ciarlo signed as an undrafted free agent ahead of the 2024 season. | |

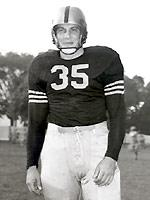
Felix "Doc" Blanchard

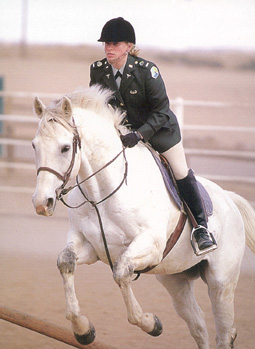
Anita Allen

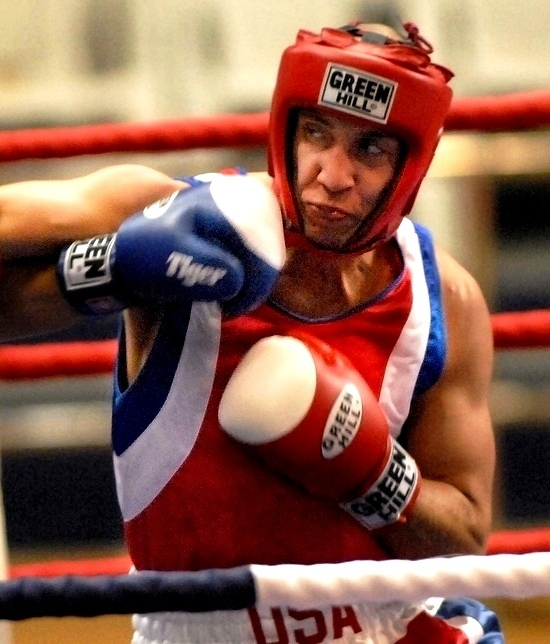
Boyd Melson

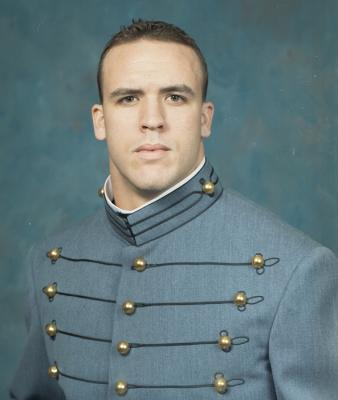
Caleb Campbell

=== Coaches ===
| Name | Class year | Notability | References |
|---|---|---|---|
| Charles S. Farnsworth | 1883 | Major General; Spanish–American War; University of North Dakota head football coach (1895–1896) | |
| Joseph Stilwell | 1904 | General; organized and was head coach of the first basketball team at West Point | |
| Charles Dudley Daly | 1905 | Lieutenant Colonel; World War I; "Godfather of West Point Football"; early promoter of American football | |
| Robert Neyland | 1916 | Brigadier General; World War I; University of Tennessee head football coach (1926–1939) and (1946–1952); member of College Football Hall of Fame (as a coach); four-time national champion and five-time SEC champion at Tennessee | |
| Earl Blaik | 1920 | Cavalry officer for two years; head football coach at Dartmouth College (1934–1940) and United States Military Academy (1941–1958); member of College Football Hall of Fame; two-time national champion at Army (as a coach) | |
| Robert V. Whitlow | 1943 | United States Army Air Forces and Air Force fighter and bomber pilot, World War II; head football coach (1955) and athletic director (1954–1957) of the Air Force Academy; "athletic director" of the Chicago Cubs baseball club (1963–1965) | |
| Bill Yeoman | 1948 | Head coach at the University of Houston; Member of the College Football Hall of Fame; Inventor of the Veer Offense; Played prominent role in racial integration of college athletics in the South; Captain of undefeated 1948 Army Football team and second team All-American center; Played for Earl Blaik; Only underclassman to captain an Army football team | |
| Mike Krzyzewski | 1969 | Captain; recipient of West Point Association of Graduates Distinguished Graduate award in 2005; head basketball coach, West Point (1975–1981) and Duke University (1981–present); men's basketball gold medal-winning team head coach at 2008, 2012, and 2016 Summer Olympics; five-time NCAA national champion; 2001 inductee of the Naismith Memorial Basketball Hall of Fame | |

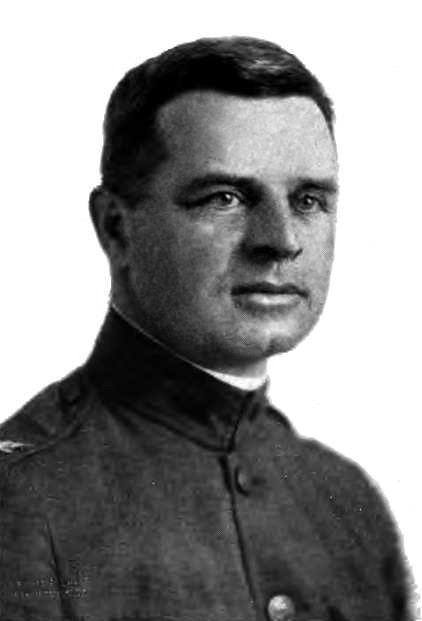
Charles Daly

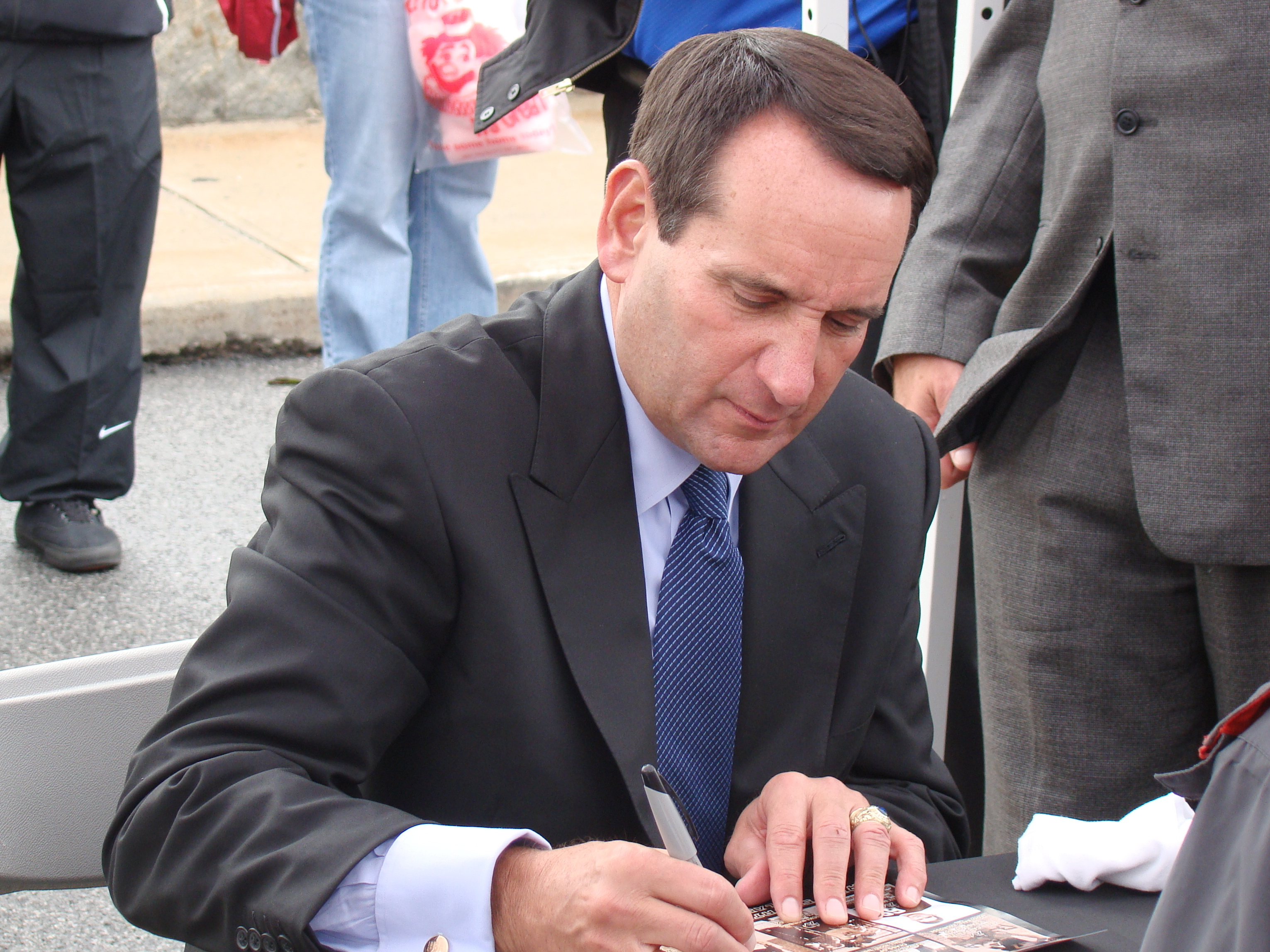
Mike Krzyzewski

== Television and movie figures ==
- James Salter, class of 1945, screenwriter
- Rod Lurie, class of 1984, director, screenwriter. Directed The Outpost (2019)
- Mark Valley, class of 1987, actor
- Kelly Perdew, class of 1989, reality show winner, The Apprentice (2004)
- Greg Plitt, class of 2000, fitness supermodel and actor

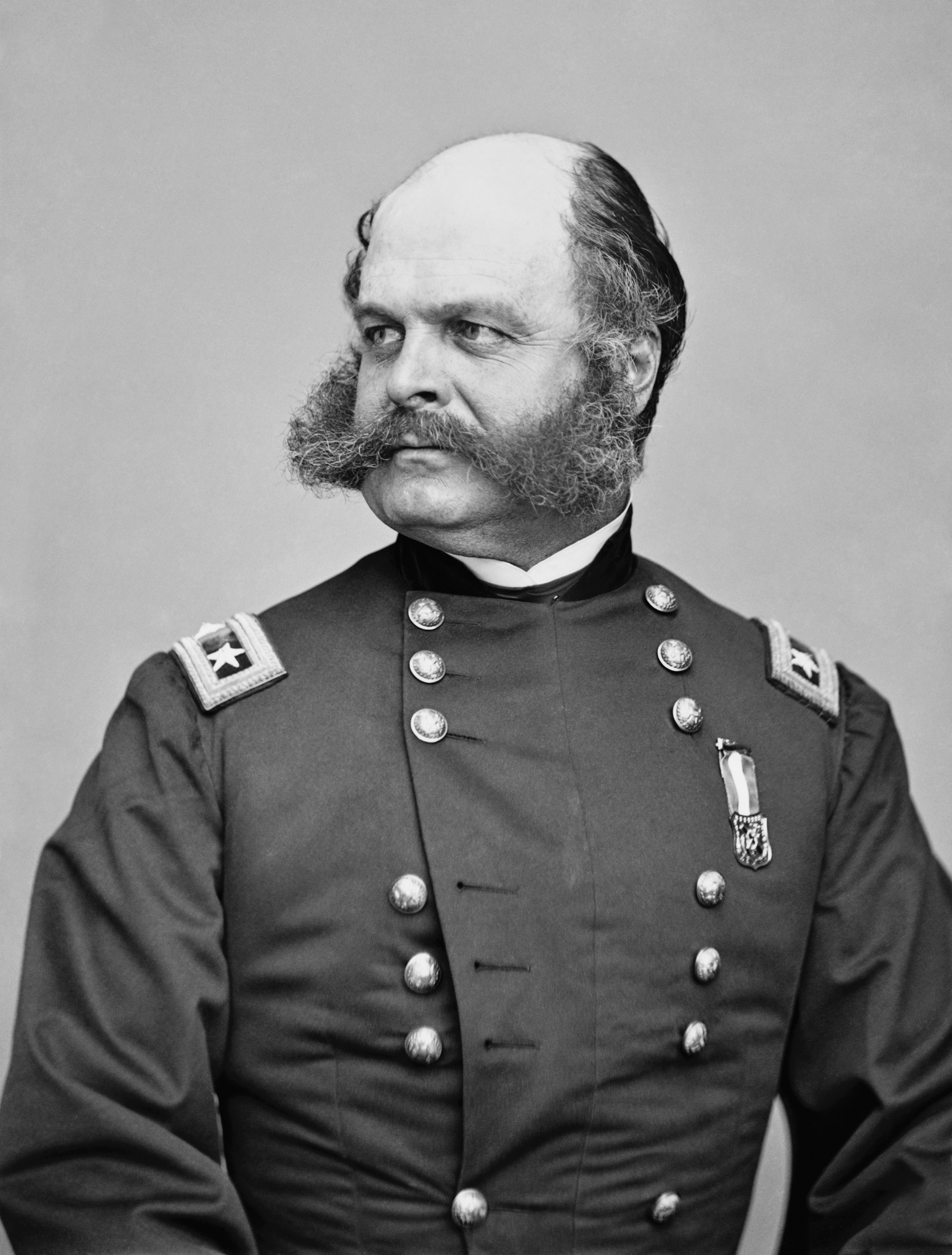
Ambrose Burnside, class of 1847

== Eponyms ==
- Ambrose Burnside, class of 1847 – sideburns
- Robert Parker Parrott, class of 1824 - inventor of the Parrott rifle used extensively during the American Civil War
- Thomas Jackson Rodman, class of 1841 - inventor of the Rodman gun
- Henry Martyn Robert, class of 1857 – Robert's Rules of Order
- John T. Thompson, class of 1882 – inventor of the Thompson submachine gun, also known as the "Tommy Gun"
- Isaac Newton Lewis, class of 1884 - inventor of the Lewis gun
- Creighton Abrams, class of 1936 - M1 Abrams tank
- Edward A. Murphy Jr., class of 1940 – Murphy's Law

== Places named for graduates ==
| Name | Class year | Notability | References |
|---|---|---|---|
| John Joseph Abercrombie | 1822 | Fort Abercrombie, North Dakota (1860-1877) was named after him. Abercrombie Township, Richland County, North Dakota is named after him. | |
| William Wallace Smith Bliss | 1833 | Fort Bliss, Texas is named after him. | |
| George B. McClellan | 1846 | Fort McClellan in Alabama, McClellan Butte and McClellan Peak in the state of Washington, where he traveled while conducting the Pacific Railroad Survey in 1853, and a bronze equestrian statue honoring General McClellan in Washington, D.C. The McClellan Gate at Arlington National Cemetery is dedicated to him and displays his name. McClellan Park in Milbridge, Maine, was donated to the town by the general's son with the stipulation that it be named for the general. Camp McClellan, in Davenport, IA, is a former Union Army camp established in August 1861 after the outbreak of the Civil War. The camp was the training grounds for recruits and a hospital for the wounded. McClellan Fitness Center is a United States Army gym located at Fort Eustis, Virginia near his Peninsula Campaign. McClellan Heights Historic District in Davenport, Iowa is named in his honor. | |
| Jesse L. Reno | 1846 | The cities of Reno, Nevada, Reno, Ohio, El Reno, Oklahoma, and Reno, Pennsylvania, are all named for the general. The first two contain monuments to him in their downtown areas. The one in Reno stands along Virginia Street; the one in El Reno stands in Youngheim Plaza on Russell Street. The United States Army named three outposts after Reno: Fort Pennsylvania in present-day Washington, D.C., was renamed Fort Reno in 1862, Fort Reno was constructed near present-day El Reno, Oklahoma in 1874, the third Fort Reno was built in present-day Wyoming on the Bozeman Trail in 1865. Reno County, Kansas is also named in his honor. The Jesse L. Reno School in Washington, DC was named in his honor. It closed in 1950. | |
| John Bell Hood | 1853 | Fort Hood, Texas was named after him (renamed to Fort Cavazos in 2023). Hood County, Texas is named after him. | |
| James B. McPherson | 1853 | Fort McPherson near Atlanta, Georgia, was named after him. McPherson Square in Washington, D.C., and its Metro rail station are named in the general's honor. At the center of the square is a statue of McPherson on horseback. McPherson County, Kansas, and the town of McPherson, Kansas, are named in his honor. McPherson Township, Blue Earth County, Minnesota is also named for him. There is also an equestrian statue of him in the park across from the McPherson County Courthouse. McPherson County, South Dakota, founded in 1873, and organized in 1885, was also named in his honor. McPherson County, Nebraska, and Fort McPherson National Cemetery, located near Maxwell, Nebraska, were named in his honor, and the National Cemetery was established on March 3, 1873. | |
| John M. Schofield | 1853 | Schofield Barracks, Hawaii is named in his honor. | |
| Charles Garrison Harker | 1858 | Fort Harker in Kansas, an active garrison of the United States Army from 1866 to 1872, was named in his honor. The Charles G. Harker School in the Swedesboro-Woolwich School District, New Jersey, is named in his honor. | |
| George LeRoy Irwin | 1889 | Fort Irwin National Training Center, California is named in his honor. | |
| Tasker H. Bliss | 1875 | The U.S. Navy transports USS Tasker H. Bliss (AP-42) and USS General T. H. Bliss (AP-131) were named after him. | |
| Lesley J. McNair | 1904 | Fort Lesley J. McNair, Washington, D.C. is named after him. Fort McNair is today part of the Joint Base Myer–Henderson Hall, the headquarters of the Army's Military District of Washington, and serves as home to the National Defense University, as well as the official residence of the Vice Chief of Staff of the United States Army. | |
| Adna R. Chaffee Jr. | 1906 | Fort Chaffee Maneuver Training Center, Arkansas is named in his honor. | |
| Hoyt Vandenberg | 1923 | Vandenberg Space Force Base on the central coast of California is named after him. | |
| James M. Gavin | 1929 | Gavin Power Plant in Cheshire, Ohio is named in his honor. | |

== Graduates depicted on currency ==
- James B. McPherson, $2 bill, 1890s
- Pierre Gustave Toutant de Beauregard, $20 1863 State of Louisiana, Shreveport
- Joseph K. Mansfield, $500 1873, 1875, 1878, 1880 United States (legal tender) notes
- George Henry Thomas, $5 1890, 1891 Treasury or coin notes
- Jefferson Davis, on Confederate notes
- George Meade, $1,000 1890, 1891 Treasury notes
- Robert E. Lee, on U.S. coins, the 1937 Battle of Antietam Half Dollar Commemorative, and 1925 Stone Mountain Commemorative
- George McClellan, on 1937 Battle of Antietam Half Dollar Commemorative, 10¢ 1863 Searsport Bank, Maine, $1 1862 Chicopee Bank, Mass., $2 1861 Merchants Bank, N.J., $20 1862 Rutland County Bank, Vt.
- Stonewall Jackson, on U.S. coin, the 1925 Stone Mountain Commemorative, $500 17 Feb. 1864, Confederate note
- William T. Sherman, 15¢ fractional currency (proof notes), fourth issue, never circulated
- Winfield Scott Hancock, $2 silver certificates 1880s-90s
- Ulysses S. Grant, class of 1843, on 1922 Grant Memorial Half Dollar and current U.S. $50 bill
- Philip Sheridan, $5 1896 silver certificate (back), $10 1890, 1891 Treasury or coin notes
- Douglas MacArthur, 2500 piso gold, 1980, Philippines
- Dwight D. Eisenhower, $1 coin from 1971 to 1978, and 1990 Eisenhower Centennial Dollar
- Fidel V. Ramos, 2000 piso gold, 1996, Philippines
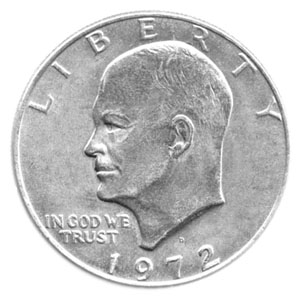
$1 coin. Dwight D. Eisenhower, class of 1915 on obverse. The reverse is based on the Apollo 11 mission patch designed by Michael Collins, class of 1952.

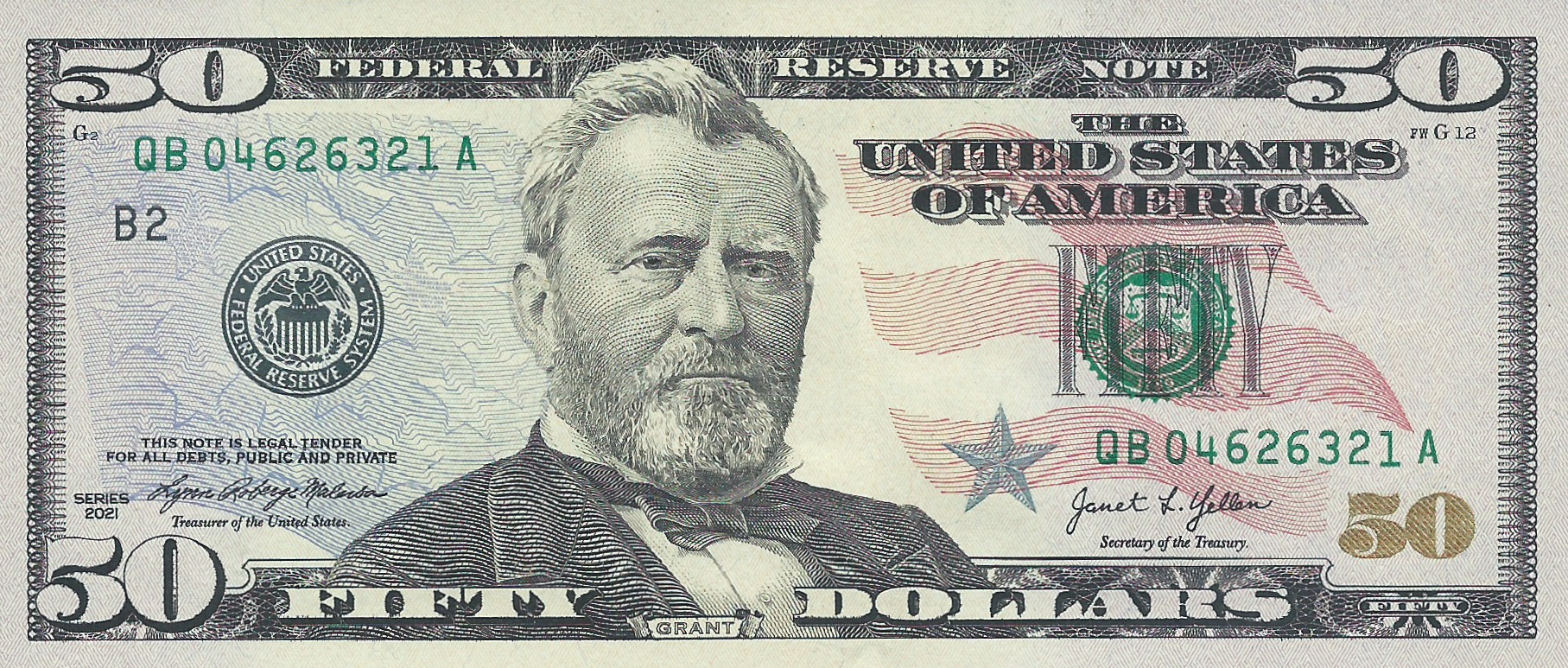
$50 bill. U.S. Grant, class of 1846

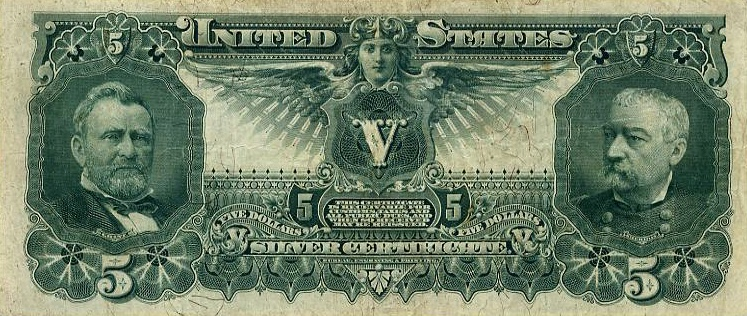
$5 silver certificate with U.S. Grant and Phillip Sheridan

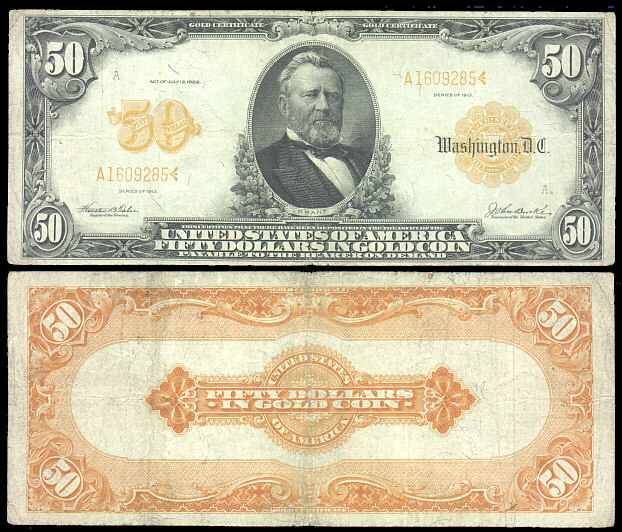
U.S. Grant on a gold certificate

== Graduates depicted on postage stamps ==
- Alden Partridge, class of 1806, appears on 11¢ Great Americans series stamp (1985)
- Sylvanus Thayer, class of 1808, appears on 9¢ Great Americans series stamp (1985)
- Jefferson Davis, class of 1828, appears on 6¢ Stone Mountain Memorial commemorative stamp (1970), 32¢ Civil War commemorative stamp (1995) and eight Confederate stamps
- Joseph E. Johnston, class of 1829, appears on 32¢ Civil War commemorative stamp (1995)
- Robert E. Lee, class of 1829, appears on 4¢ Army commemorative stamp (1937), 30¢ Liberty series stamp (1955 and 1957), 6¢ Stone Mountain Memorial stamp (1970), and 32¢ Civil War commemorative stamp (1995)
- Montgomery Blair, class of 1835, appears on 15¢ airmail stamp (1963) and on one Belgian stamp
- William Tecumseh Sherman, class of 1840, appears on 8¢ stamps (1893 and 1895), 3¢ Army commemorative stamp (1937), 32¢ Civil War commemorative stamp (1995), and on stamps from Guam, the Philippines, and Puerto Rico
- Ulysses S. Grant, class of 1843, appears on 5¢ stamps (1890, 1895, 1898), 4¢ stamp (1903), 8¢ stamp (1922), 3¢ Army commemorative stamp (1937), 18¢ Presidential series stamp (1938), 32¢ Civil War commemorative stamp (1995)
- Winfield Scott Hancock, class of 1844, appears on 32¢ Civil War commemorative stamp (1995)
- Stonewall Jackson, class of 1846, appears on 4¢ Army commemorative stamp (1937) and 6¢ Stone Mountain Memorial stamp (1970)
- Phillip Sheridan, class of 1853, appears on 3¢ Army commemorative stamp (1937)
- George Washington Goethals, class of 1880, appears on 3¢ Panama Canal commemorative stamp (1939) and on stamps issued for the Panama Canal Zone
- John J. Pershing, class of 1886, appears on 8¢ Liberty series stamp (1961) and on French stamps
- John L. Hines, class of 1891, appears on 33¢ Distinguished Soldiers commemorative stamp (2000)
- Douglas MacArthur, class of 1903, appears on 6¢ commemorative stamp (1971) and on stamps from Korea and the Philippines
- Joseph Stilwell, class of 1904, appears on 10¢ Distinguished Americans series stamp (2000)
- Henry H. Arnold, class of 1907, appears on 65¢ Great Americans series stamp (1988)
- George S. Patton Jr., class of 1909, appears on 3¢ commemorative stamp (1953) and on stamps from Belgium and Luxembourg.
- Omar Bradley, class of 1915, appears on 33¢ Distinguished Soldiers commemorative stamp (2000)
- Dwight D. Eisenhower, class of 1915, appears on 6¢ commemorative stamp (1969), 6¢ (1970) and 8¢ (1971) Prominent Americans series stamps, and on stamps of other countries
- Frank Borman, class of 1950, appears on ten stamps of Haiti, Hungary, and Senegal
- Fidel V. Ramos, class of 1950, appears on numerous Philippine Stamps since the 1990s
- Buzz Aldrin, class of 1951, appears on foreign stamps

== Graduates selected as Time Magazine's "Person of the Year" ==
- Hugh S. Johnson, class of 1903, Man of the Year – 1933
- Dwight D. Eisenhower, class of 1915, Man of the Year – 1944, 1959
- General William Westmoreland, class of 1936, Man of the Year – 1965
- Col. Frank Borman, Apollo 8, Men of the Year – 1968 (shared honor with U.S. Naval Academy graduates James Lovell and Col. William Anders)

== Other ==
- Maj. David Moniac, class of 1822
- Maj. Gen. Whitfield Jack, class of 1928
- Gen. Braxton Bragg, class of 1837
- Lt. Gen. Jubal Early, class of 1837
- Maj. Gen. Joseph Hooker, class of 1837
- Lt. Gen. Richard S. Ewell, class of 1840
- Gen. James Longstreet, class of 1842
- Maj. Gen. William Rosecrans, class of 1842
- Lt. Gen. and Gov. Simon Bolivar Buckner, class of 1844
- Maj. Gen. Winfield Scott Hancock, class of 1844
- Gen. Stonewall Jackson, class of 1846
- Maj. Gen. George B. McClellan, class of 1846
- Maj. Gen. George Pickett, class of 1846; graduated last in the class
- Maj. Gen. Ambrose Burnside, class of 1847
- Lt. Gen. A. P. Hill, class of 1847
- Maj. Gen. John Buford, class of 1848
- Jerome Napoleon Bonaparte II, class of 1848
- Brig. Gen. Eugene Asa Carr, class of 1850
- Maj. Gen. Alvan Cullem Gillem, class of 1851
- Maj. Gen. George Crook, class of 1852
- Lt. Gen John Schofield, class of 1853
- Gen. Philip Sheridan, class of 1853
- Maj. Gen. Oliver O. Howard, class of 1854
- Gen. Jeb Stuart, class of 1854
- Gen. George Armstrong Custer, class of June 1861; graduated last in class
- Brig. Gen. William Louis Marshall, class of 1868
- Richard H. Poillon, class of 1871; Brooklyn Fire Commissioner
- Gen. Tasker H. Bliss, class of 1875
- Brig. Gen. Willard Young class of 1875; first Mormon graduate and son of Brigham Young
- Maj. Gen. Hugh L. Scott, class of 1876
- Henry O. Flipper, class of 1877; first black American graduate
- Maj. Gen. J. Franklin Bell, class of 1878
- Lt. Gen. Hunter Liggett, class of 1879

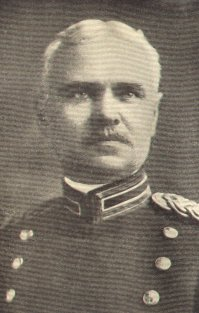
George Washington Goethals, class of 1880

- George Washington Goethals, class of 1880
- Maj. Gen. John Wilson Ruckman, class of 1883
- General of the Armies John J. Pershing, class of 1886
- General Peyton C. March, class of 1888
- General John L. Hines, class of 1891
- General Charles Pelot Summerall, class of 1892
- Maj. Gen. Fox Conner, class of 1898
- Robert E. Wood, class of 1900
- Thomas Selfridge, class of 1903; the first person to die in a crash of a powered airplane
- Gen. Lesley J. McNair, class of 1904
- Gen. Joseph W. "Vinegar Joe" Stilwell, class of 1904
- Gen. Jonathan Mayhew Wainwright IV, class of 1906

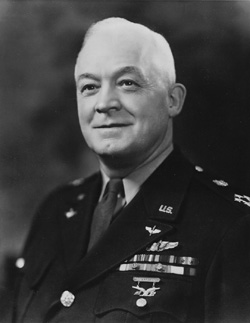
Hap Arnold, class of 1907

- General of the Air Force Henry "Hap" Arnold, class of 1907
- Lt. Gen. Simon Bolivar Buckner Jr., class of 1908
- Gen. Jacob L. Devers, class of 1909
- Gen. Robert L. Eichelberger, class of 1909
- Gen. George S. Patton, class of 1909
- Lt. Gen. William Hood Simpson, class of 1909
- Gen. Wade H. Haislip, class of 1912
- Lt. Gen. Walton Walker, class of 1912
- Gen. Alexander Patch, class of 1913
- Maj. Gen Junius Wallace Jones, class of 1913
- Brig. Gen. Vicente Lim, class of 1914
- Gen. Brehon B. Somervell, class of 1914
- Gen. Carl Andrew Spaatz, class of 1914
- General of the Army Omar Bradley, class of 1915
- General of the Army Dwight Eisenhower, class of 1915
- Gen. Hubert Harmon, class of 1915
- Gen. Joseph T. McNarney, class of 1915
- Lt. Gen. George E. Stratemeyer, class of 1915
- Gen. James Van Fleet, class of 1915
- Gen. Robert Neyland, class of 1916
- Gen. Mark W. Clark, class of 1917
- Maj. Gen. Norman Cota, class of 1917
- Maj. Gen. Ernest N. Harmon, class of 1917
- Gen. Matthew B. Ridgway, class of 1917
- Maj. Gen. Norman Schwarzkopf Sr., class of 1917
- Gen. Lucius D. Clay, class of June 1918
- Lt. Gen Leslie Groves, class of November 1918
- Gen. Alfred Gruenther, class of 1919
- Gen. Anthony McAuliffe, class of 1919
- Gen. Williston B. Palmer, class of 1919
- Gen. Maxwell D. Taylor, class of 1922
- Col. Mickey Marcus, class of 1924
- Lt. Gen. James M. Gavin, class of 1929
- Gen. Harold K. Johnson, class of 1933
- Lt. Gen. Leighton I. Davis, class of 1935
- Lt. Gen. Benjamin O. Davis Jr., class of 1936
- Gen. William Westmoreland, class of 1936
- Gen. Rafael Ileto, class of 1943
- Gen. Bernard W. Rogers, class of 1943
- Gen. Anastasio Somoza Debayle, class of 1946
- Col. Thomas L. Gatch Jr., class of 1946
- Gov. Warren E. Hearnes, class of 1946
- Lt. Gen. Brent Scowcroft, class of 1947
- Gen. Roscoe Robinson Jr., class of 1951
- John Block, class of 1957
- Brig. Gen. Pete Dawkins, class of 1959
- Col. Jim Nicholson, class of 1961
- Maj. James Kimsey, class of 1962
- Gen. George A. Fisher Jr., class of 1964, commander of Multi-National Force – Haiti during Operation Uphold Democracy (1995)
- Gen. Barry McCaffrey, class of 1964
- Gen. Eric K. Shinseki, class of 1965
- Gen. Wesley Clark, class of 1966
- Brig. Gen. Thomas E. White, class of 1967
- Maj. Gen. Albert Madora, class of 1968
- Brig. Gen. Patrick Finnegan, class of 1971
- Capt. Jack Reed, class of 1971
- Gen. Richard A. Cody, class of 1972, U.S. Army Vice Chief of Staff (2004-2008)
- Col. William S. McArthur, class of 1973
- Gen. Keith B. Alexander, class of 1974
- Gen. Walter L. Sharp, class of 1974
- Capt. Louis Caldera, class of 1978
- Gen. John F. Campbell, class of 1979, U.S. Army Vice Chief of Staff (2013-2014)
- José María Figueres, class of 1979
- Col. Robert L. Gordon III, class of 1979
- Maj. Gen. Gregg F. Martin, class of 1979
- Gen. Daniel B. Allyn, class of 1981, U.S. Army Vice Chief of Staff (2014-2017)
- Capt. Geoff Davis, class of 1981
- Maj. Gen. Nadja West, class of 1982, the first black Army Surgeon General, the first black female active-duty major general, and the first black female major general in Army medicine
- Gen. Joseph M. Martin, class of 1986, U.S. Army Vice Chief of Staff (2019–2022)
- Gen. Ronald P. Clark, class of 1988
- Lt. Col Jen Easterly, class of 1990; director of Cybersecurity and Infrastructure Security Agency under the Biden Administration
- Lt. Dan Choi, class of 2003; founding member and spokesperson of Knights Out, an organization of West Point alumni who support the rights of LGBT soldiers to serve openly

== Non-graduates ==
As these alumni did not graduate, their class year represents the year they would have graduated if they had completed their education at the Academy.

| Name | Class year | Notability | References |
|---|---|---|---|
| Jacob Zeilin | ex 1826 | First United States Marine Corps general officer, Commandant of the Marine Corps (1864–1876); part of Commodore Perry's expedition to Japan; discharged due to academics | |
| Edgar Allan Poe | ex 1834 | Served as a non-commissioned officer in the U.S. Army 1827–1829; author who excelled in language; expelled for neglecting duties | |
| James Abbott McNeill Whistler | ex 1855 | Artist; discharged for academic and disciplinary problems after three years | |
| Timothy Leary | ex 1943 | Counterculture icon, LSD proponent; dropped out (and later coined phrase "Turn on, tune in, drop out") | |
| Adam Vinatieri | ex 1995 | National Football League (NFL) placekicker New England Patriots and Indianapolis Colts; left the Academy after two weeks | |

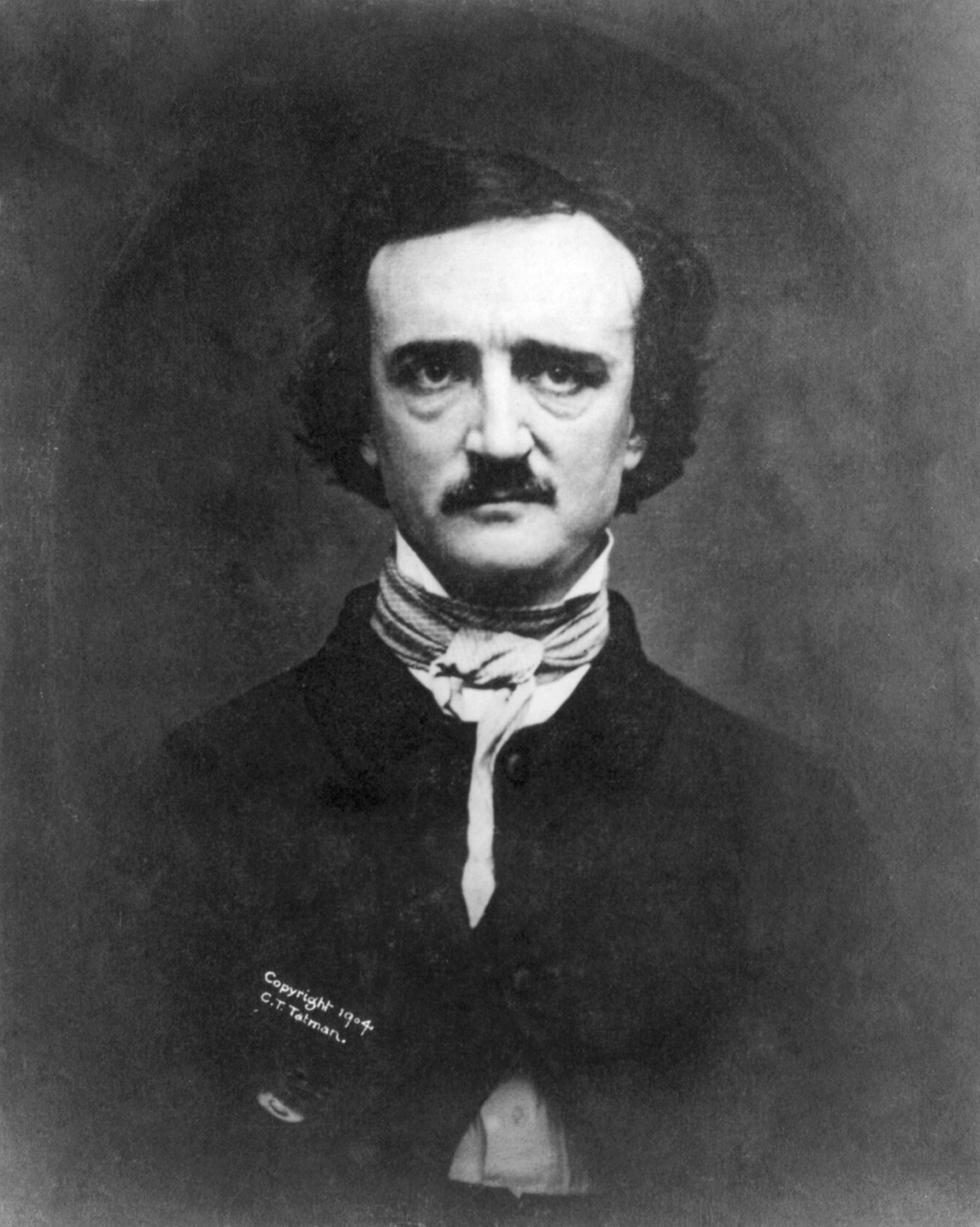
Edgar Allan Poe
