= Commandant of the Army War College =

Senior U.S. Army officer commanding the United States Army War College

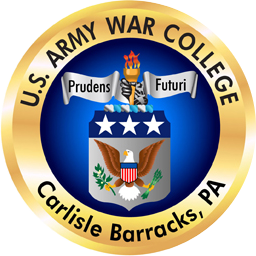
Seal of the Army War College

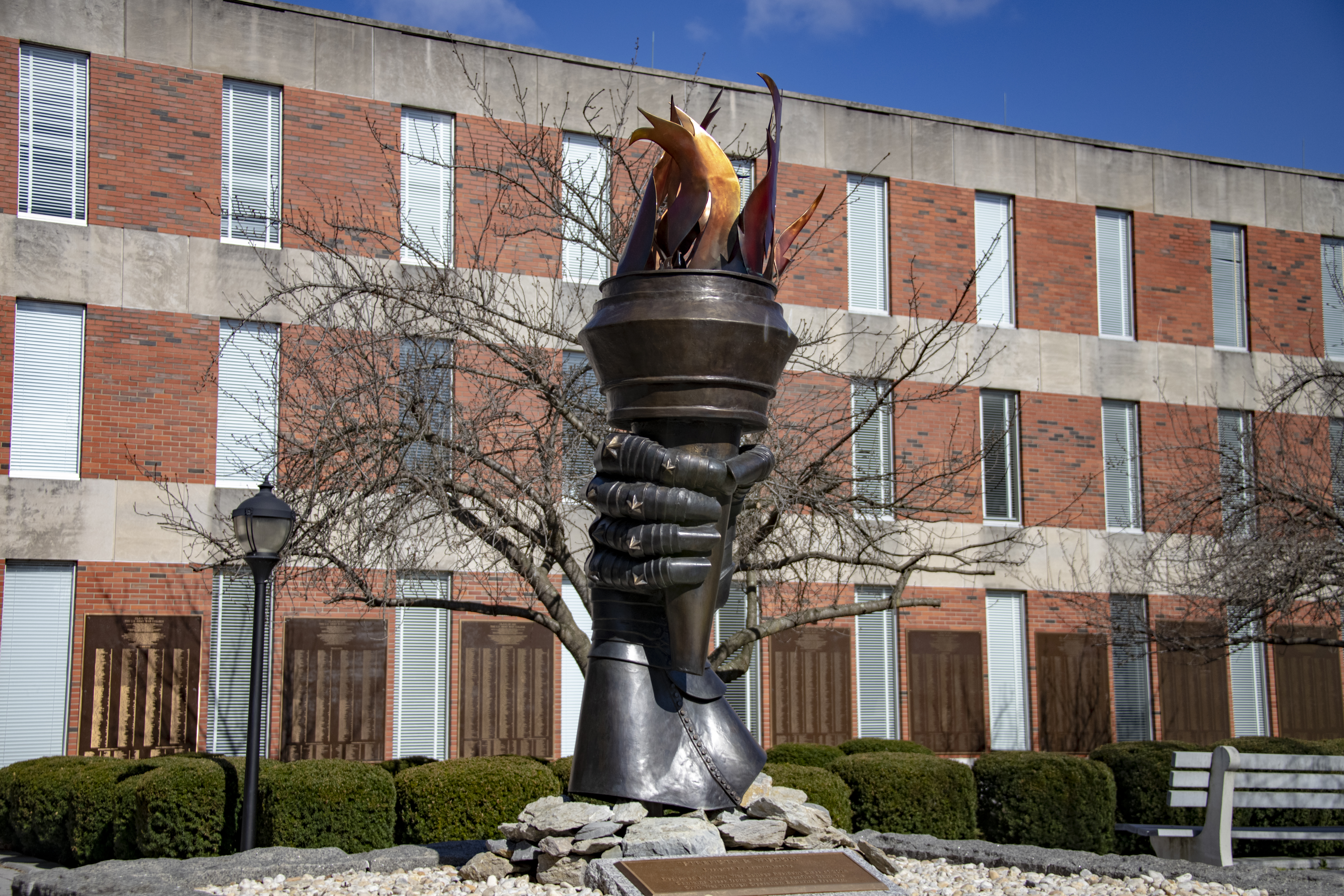
The "Light of Learning" statue at the Army War College

The commandant of the Army War College is the senior United States Army officer commanding the United States Army War College. As a direct reporting unit of the United States Army, the commandant is responsible to the Secretary of the Army and Chief of Staff of the United States Army for the successful running of the Army War College. Since 1986, the commandant's official residence is Quarters 1 in Carlisle Barracks.

The position dates from 27 November 1901, when General Order 155 established a War College Board to advise the President of the United States and the direct the "intellectual exercise" of the Army. Major General Samuel B.M. Young was appointed president of the Board, thus making him the first President of the Army War College, despite the college only beginning operations under his successor, Brigadier General Tasker H. Bliss. The position was retitled as Commandant of the Army War College with the appointment of Major General James W. McAndrew to the presidency in 1919. Five commandants later became superintendent of the United States Military Academy.

The commandantship was vacant for two separate periods, both during wartime when classes were suspended: from August 1918 to June 1919 (during World War I) and from July 1940 to January 1950 (during World War II and the early postwar era).

The commandant, since 1986, has consistently held the rank of major general.

== Commandants ==
List of commandants in chronological order

# (Note: Repeat terms are to be bracketed with the same number. This is not an official numbering.)	Rank (Note: Highest rank held by the officeholder while serving as Commandant.)	Name	Photo	Term began	Term ended	Term length	Notes (Note: Achievements of the officeholder while serving as Commandant; notable military or political positions held post-commandantship, in particular leadership of other military institutions such as the U.S. Military Academy or U.S. Army Command and General Staff College.)
1	Major General	Samuel B. M. Young		1 July 1902	15 August 1903	1 year, 45 days	Oversaw the initial establishment of the Army War College. Later served as Chief of Staff of the United States Army from 1903 to 1904 under the General Staff Act of 1903, which also enshrined the office of president of the Army War College into statutory law.
2	Brigadier General	Tasker H. Bliss		15 August 1903	15 April 1905	1 year, 243 days	
3	Brigadier General	Thomas H. Barry		4 December 1905	21 February 1907	1 year, 79 days	Later served as Superintendent of the United States Military Academy from 1910 to 1912.
4	Brigadier General	William W. Wotherspoon		9 October 1907	19 June 1909	1 year, 253 days	
5	Brigadier General	Tasker H. Bliss		21 June 1909	1 December 1909	163 days	Later served as Chief of Staff of the United States Army from 1917 to 1918.
6	Brigadier General	William W. Wotherspoon		1 December 1909	13 January 1912	2 years, 43 days	Later served as Chief of Staff of the United States Army in 1914.
7	Brigadier General	Albert L. Mills		2 February 1912	31 August 1912	211 days	Medal of Honor recipient in the Spanish–American War. Previously served as Superintendent of the United States Military Academy from 1898 to 1906. Later served as Chief of the Militia Bureau from 1912 to 1916.
8	Brigadier General	William Crozier		1 September 1912	1 July 1913	303 days	
9	Brigadier General	Hunter Liggett		1 July 1913	22 April 1914	295 days	
10	Brigadier General	Montgomery M. Macomb		22 April 1914	12 October 1916	2 years, 173 days	
11	Brigadier General	Joseph E. Kuhn		1 February 1917	25 August 1917	205 days	
				May 1917	June 1919	25 months	Army War College classes suspended during World War I.
12	Major General	James W. McAndrew		15 June 1919	6 July 1921	2 years, 21 days	
13	Major General	Edward F. McGlachlin Jr.		14 July 1921	30 June 1923	1 year, 351 days	
14	Major General	Hanson E. Ely		1 July 1923	30 November 1927	4 years, 152 days	
15	Major General	William D. Connor		20 December 1927	30 April 1932	4 years, 132 days	
16	Major General	George S. Simonds		1 May 1932	31 January 1935	2 years, 275 days	
17	Major General	Malin Craig		4 February 1935	1 October 1935	239 days	Later served as Chief of Staff of the United States Army from 1935 to 1939.
–	Colonel	Walter S. Grant (Acting)		3 October 1935	23 June 1936	264 days	
18	Brigadier General	Walter S. Grant		24 June 1936	30 June 1937	1 year, 6 days	
19	Major General	John L. DeWitt		30 June 1937	30 November 1939	2 years, 153 days	
20	Brigadier General	Philip B. Peyton		1 December 1939	30 June 1940	212 days	
				1 July 1940	25 January 1950	9 years, 208 days	Army War College classes suspended during and after World War II.
21	Lieutenant General	Joseph M. Swing		1 April 1950	31 July 1951	1 year, 121 days	
22	Lieutenant General	Edward M. Almond		31 August 1951	6 December 1952	1 year, 97 days	
23	Major General	James E. Moore		20 April 1953	5 February 1955	1 year, 291 days	
24	Major General	Clyde D. Eddleman		27 May 1955	10 October 1955	136 days	Later served as Vice Chief of Staff of the United States Army from 1960 to 1962.
25	Major General	Max S. Johnson		10 October 1955	11 February 1959	3 years, 124 days	
26	Major General	William P. Ennis Jr.		16 February 1959	31 July 1960	1 year, 166 days	
27	Major General	Thomas W. Dunn		8 August 1960	16 February 1962	1 year, 192 days	
28	Major General	William F. Train		1 May 1962	30 June 1964	2 years, 60 days	
29	Major General	Eugene A. Salet		1 July 1964	22 August 1967	3 years, 52 days	
30	Major General	William J. McCaffrey		15 September 1967	6 July 1969	1 year, 294 days	
31	Major General	George S. Eckhardt		7 July 1969	15 March 1971	1 year, 251 days	
32	Major General	Franklin M. Davis Jr.		4 May 1971	26 June 1974	3 years, 53 days	
33	Major General	DeWitt C. Smith Jr.		1 July 1974	31 July 1977	3 years, 30 days	
34	Major General	Robert G. Yerks		1 August 1977	31 July 1978	364 days	
35	Major General	DeWitt C. Smith Jr.		1 August 1978	30 June 1980	1 year, 334 days	
36	Major General	Jack N. Merritt		1 July 1980	22 July 1982	2 years, 21 days	
37	Major General	Richard D. Lawrence		2 August 1982	22 September 1983	1 year, 51 days	Later served as president of the National Defense University from 1983 to 1986.
38	Major General	Thomas F. Healy		26 October 1983	19 June 1985	1 year, 236 days	
39	Major General	James E. Thompson Jr.		20 June 1985	30 September 1987	2 years, 102 days	
40	Major General	Howard D. Graves		1 October 1987	7 July 1989	1 year, 279 days	Later served as Superintendent of the United States Military Academy from 1991 to 1996.
41	Major General	Paul G. Cerjan		10 July 1989	18 August 1991	2 years, 39 days	
42	Major General	William A. Stofft		19 August 1991	25 July 1994	2 years, 340 days	
43	Major General	Richard A. Chilcoat		29 July 1994	25 July 1997	2 years, 361 days	
44	Major General	Robert H. Scales Jr.		3 August 1997	28 July 2000	2 years, 360 days	
45	Major General	Robert R. Ivany		31 July 2000	28 July 2003	2 years, 362 days	
46	Major General	David H. Huntoon Jr.		15 August 2003	21 January 2008	4 years, 159 days	Later served as Superintendent of the United States Military Academy from 2010 to 2013.
47	Major General	Robert M. Williams		22 January 2008	20 June 2010	2 years, 149 days	
48	Major General	Gregg F. Martin		21 June 2010	14 June 2012	1 year, 359 days	Later served as President of the National Defense University from 2012 to 2014.
49	Major General	Anthony A. Cucolo III		15 June 2012	13 June 2014	1 year, 363 days	
50	Major General	William E. Rapp		13 June 2014	28 July 2017	3 years, 45 days	
51	Major General	John S. Kem		28 July 2017	30 July 2020	3 years, 2 days	
52	Major General	Stephen J. Maranian		30 July 2020	31 August 2021	1 year, 32 days	Later served as Commanding General, 56th Artillery Command from 2021 to 2023. Directed revisions and innovations in curriculum and teaching methodologies, and hired faculty experienced with emerging issues.
53	Major General	David C. Hill		31 August 2021	1 August 2025	3 years, 335 days	Oversaw innovations to both resident and distributed learning curricula as well as the construction of a state of the art academic facility.
54	Major General	Trevor J. Bredenkamp		1 August 2025	29 July 2026	362 days	
55	Brigadier General	Antwan L. Dunmyer		29 July 2026	Incumbent	25 days	

== See also ==
- Superintendent of the United States Military Academy
- Superintendent of the United States Naval Academy
- President of the Naval War College
- Superintendent of the United States Air Force Academy
- List of commandants of cadets of the United States Air Force Academy
