= Henry Brewerton =

Union Army General

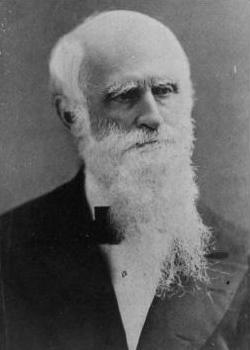
- Henry Brewerton
- Born: September 25, 1801; New York City, New York, U.S.
- Died: April 17, 1879 (aged 77); Wilmington, Delaware, U.S.
- Burial place: Island Cemetery, Newport, Rhode Island
- Military career
- Allegiance: United States of America; Union
- Branch: United States Army; Union Army
- Service years: 1819–1867
- Rank: Colonel; Brevet brigadier general
- Commands: Superintendent, United States Military Academy
- Conflicts: American Civil War

Henry Brewerton (September 25, 1801 – April 17, 1879) was a career engineering officer in the United States Army, serving as the superintendent of the United States Military Academy and then as a colonel in the Union Army during the American Civil War. He was nominated for appointment to the grade of brevet brigadier general in the Regular Army (United States) by President Andrew Johnson on December 11, 1866, to rank from March 13, 1865, and the United States Senate confirmed the appointment on February 23, 1867.

== Early life and career ==
Henry Brewerton was born in New York City, New York. He lost his parents at a very early age, but, under the guardianship of future governor of New York and vice president of the United States Daniel D. Tompkins, entered the United States Military Academy at West Point, New York, two months before his 12th birthday – making him the youngest cadet in the history of West Point.

He graduated on July 1, 1819, 5th in a class of 29 cadets and was commissioned a second lieutenant the same day. He was not yet 18 years old at the time of his commencement. After a brief tour at Rouses Point helping to survey and establish the 45th parallel along the border between the United States and Canada, Brewerton taught engineering at the academy. Apparently, his survey of Rouse's Point was inaccurate as it was later discovered that Fort Montgomery had been built on land that really belonged to Canada. This resulted in the boundary line being shifted.

After a year at West Point, Brewerton had a number of temporary assignments building fortifications in Delaware, Georgia and New York Harbor. He oversaw construction of Fort Jackson in Louisiana from 1824 to 1827 and at Fort Adams in Newport, Rhode Island, from 1827 to 1828. During his stay in Newport, his wife died. He was promoted to first lieutenant on January 1, 1825.

Brewerton then served as superintending engineer of the construction of the defenses of Charleston Harbor from 1828 to 1832 and then of the Cumberland Road (a.k.a. National Road), one of the country's first highways, in Ohio from 1832 to 1836. He was promoted to captain on September 21, 1836. He then oversaw the improvement of the Hudson River in New York from 1836 to 1842 and of the construction of Ft. Montgomery, Rouse's Point, New York from 1841 to 1845.

He returned to West Point as superintendent of the military academy on August 15, 1845. Replaced on September 1, 1852, by Robert E. Lee, he then took charge of the construction of Fort Carroll near Baltimore, Maryland, for the next few years. Brewerton was promoted to major of engineers on August 23, 1856, after almost 19 years in the rank of captain.

== Civil War service ==
At the outset of the conflict in April 1861, Brewerton was on an extended tour of Western Europe, Greece, Palestine, and Egypt, escorted by Zealous B. Tower. Promoted to lieutenant colonel, on August 6, 1861, Brewerton was thereafter superintending engineer of the fortifications and improvements of Baltimore Harbor, Fort Monroe, and Hampton Roads. He was promoted to colonel on April 22, 1864.

On December 11, 1866, President Andrew Johnson nominated Brewerton for appointment to the grade of brevet brigadier general in the regular army, to rank from March 13, 1865, and the United States Senate confirmed the appointment on February 23, 1867.

Brewerton retired on March 7, 1867, 12 days after his appointment as a brevet brigadier general was confirmed by the US Senate. He had served in the U.S. Army for more than 47 years of active service, not including his almost 6 years as a cadet at West Point. He spent his last years in Delaware.

Brewerton died at Wilmington, Delaware, on April 17, 1879, and is buried with his wife, who had pre-deceased him, at the Island Cemetery in Newport, Rhode Island.

His son George Douglas Brewerton was a noted painter, poet, and journalist. Another son was Major Henry F. Brewerton, a Civil War veteran, who served in the 5th Artillery from 1861 until his retirement in 1892.

== Dates of rank ==
- Cadet, USMA – July 25, 1813
- 2nd Lieutenant – July 1, 1819
- 1st Lieutenant – January 1, 1825
- Captain – September 21, 1836
- Major – August 23, 1856
- Lieutenant Colonel – August 6, 1861
- Colonel – April 22, 1864
- Brevet Brigadier General – March 13, 1865
- Retired – March 7, 1867

== See also ==
- List of American Civil War brevet generals (Union)

== Notes ==
Military offices
Preceded by Richard Delafield	Superintendents of the United States Military Academy; 1845 - 1852	Succeeded by Robert E. Lee
