= General Patrick =

General Patrick may refer to:

- Lt. Gen Burton D. Patrick (born 1935), U.S. Army
- Gen. Mason Patrick (1863–1942), U.S. Army, who led the air corps during the Interwar
- Maj. Gen. Marsena R. Patrick (1811–1888), U.S. Army, who served in the American Civil War
- Maj. Gen. Edwin D. Patrick (1894–1945), U.S. Army, commander of the 6th Infantry Division in World War II
