= David H. Huntoon =

United States Army general and Superintendent of the United States Military Academy

David H. Huntoon Jr.
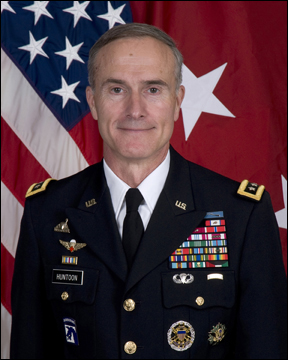
- Huntoon in 2010

58th Superintendent of the United States Military Academy
- In office July 19, 2010 – July 16, 2013
- President: Barack Obama
- Preceded by: Franklin L. Hagenbeck
- Succeeded by: Robert L. Caslen

46th Commandant of the Army War College
- In office August 15, 2003 – January 20, 2008
- President: George W. Bush
- Preceded by: Robert Ivany
- Succeeded by: Robert M. Williams

Personal details
- Born: October 27, 1951 (age 74) Germany
- Education: United States Military Academy
- Military career
- Allegiance: United States of America
- Branch: United States Army
- Service years: 1973–2013
- Rank: Lieutenant General
- Commands: Superintendent of the United States Military Academy, Commandant of the United States Army War College
- Awards: Distinguished Service Medal with two oak leaf clusters, Legion of Merit (with five oak leaf clusters), Bronze Star, Expert Infantryman Badge, Parachute Qualification Badge, Ranger tab

David Holmes Huntoon Jr. (born October 27, 1951) is a retired U.S. Army lieutenant general who served as the 58th Superintendent of the United States Military Academy at West Point, New York from 2010 to 2013.

== Early life ==
Huntoon, born in Germany in 1951, attended the Baltimore City Public Schools and graduated from the Baltimore City College (high school) in 1969. Huntoon is a 1973 graduate of the United States Military Academy at West Point.

== Military career ==
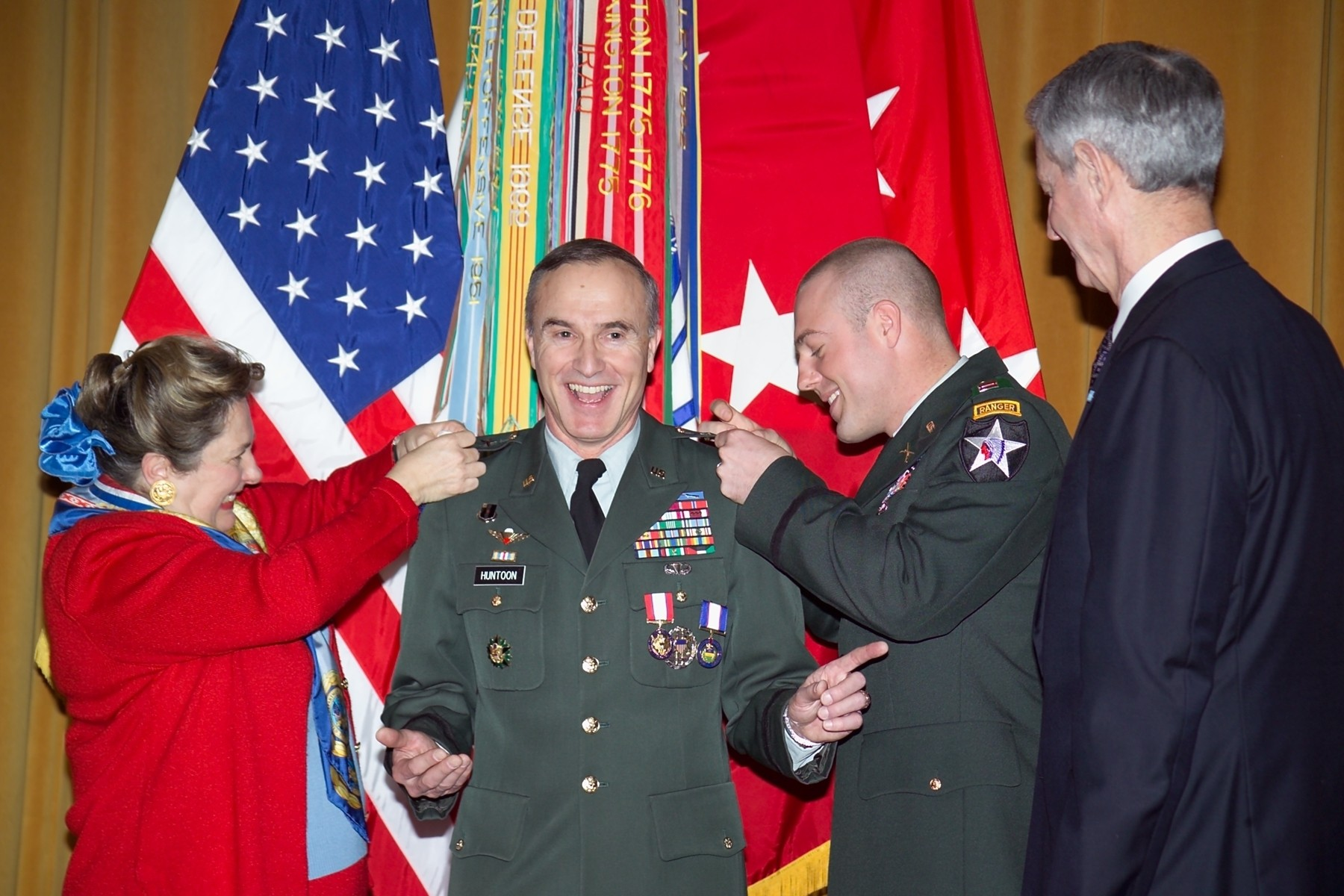
Huntoon is promoted to lieutenant general by his family at the U.S. Army War College on January 25, 2008.

Huntoon served as an infantry officer in a series of command and staff assignments in the United States and Germany. Following attendance at the United States Army Command and General Staff College and the School for Advanced Military Studies at Fort Leavenworth, Kansas, he was assigned to XVIII Airborne Corps, Fort Bragg, North Carolina. There, he was deployed as a Senior War Plans Officer for Operation Just Cause, Operation Desert Shield, and Operation Desert Storm. He commanded a mechanized infantry battalion at Camp Casey, South Korea, and served in Combined and Joint Plans for the Combined Forces Command and United Nations Command in Seoul. He was the Army's National Security Fellow at the Hoover Institution, Stanford University. He then took command of the 3rd U.S. Infantry Regiment (The Old Guard). Following his service as the Executive Officer to the Chief of Staff of the U.S. Army, he was selected as an Army brigadier general. His general officer assignments were as Assistant Division Commander of the 1st Cavalry Division, Fort Hood, Texas; leadership of the U.S. Army Command and General Staff College; Director of Strategy, Plans and Policy for the US Army; Commandant of the United States Army War College and Director of the Army Staff in the Pentagon.

In 2012 the Pentagon's Office of Inspector General found that Huntoon had misused his office while at West Point by asking subordinates to perform personal tasks for him. According to The Washington Post, the Inspector General and the Army kept the information confidential until required to release it after a Freedom of Information Act request shortly before he retired in 2013.

== Post-military career ==
Huntoon is a member of the Spectrum Group in Alexandria, Virginia, where he directs a leadership development program. He has served for over a decade as strategic coach in leader development for the US Army in their Strategic Education Program. He lectures on leadership, strategic thinking, and national security strategy as a Senior Fellow at the Center for Excellence in Public Leadership at George Washington University, as a Professor of Practice at Washington University at Brookings Executive Education Program, and has spoken on leadership at other public and private sector professional organizations in the US.

He served for ten years as a Board Director and teacher for a non-profit business certification program which supports veterans and their caregivers, and is affiliated with Georgetown University. He also served as a Trustee on the Board of the American Public University System, on the Board of Directors of the Center for Excellence in Education, as a Member of two Presidential Appointed Boards of Visitors, and on the Board of Trustees of the Naval Postgraduate School. He is the recipient of the American Psychological Association's Robert Yerkes Award for contributions to military psychology.

== Dates of rank ==
Huntoon's military ranks are listed below by date.

Insignia	Rank	Component	Date
	Second Lieutenant	Regular Army	June 6, 1973
	First Lieutenant	Regular Army	June 6, 1975
	Captain	Regular Army	June 6, 1977
	Major	Regular Army	October 1, 1984
	Lieutenant Colonel	Regular Army	January 1, 1991
	Colonel	Regular Army	September 1, 1995
	Brigadier General	Regular Army	November 1, 1999
	Major General	Regular Army	January 1, 2003
	Lieutenant General	Army of the United States	January 25, 2008
	Lieutenant General	Retired List	2013

== Awards and decorations ==
Army Distinguished Service Medal with two bronze oak leaf clusters
Legion of Merit with silver oak leaf cluster
Bronze Star

== See also ==
- List of United States Military Academy alumni (Superintendents)

Military offices
Preceded by Robert Ivany	46th Commandant of the Army War College; 2003–2008	Succeeded by Robert M. Williams
Preceded by Franklin L. Hagenbeck	58th Superintendent of the United States Military Academy; 2010–2013	Succeeded by Robert L. Caslen
