= George S. Eckhardt =

United States Army general

George Stafford Eckhardt
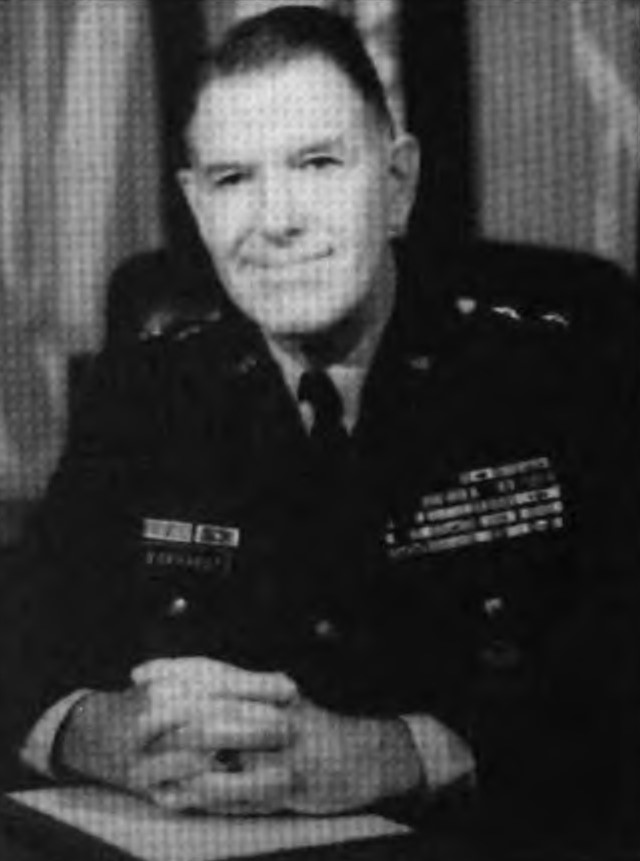
- Major general George S. Eckhardt
- Born: April 18, 1912; Kansas
- Died: September 7, 1995 (aged 83)
- Buried: Fort Sam Houston National Cemetery
- Allegiance: United States
- Branch: US Army
- Service years: 1935–1975
- Rank: Major general
- Commands: 9th Infantry Division; Commandant of the Army War College
- Conflicts: World War II; Korean War; Vietnam War
- Awards: Distinguished Service Medal (3); Legion of Merit (4)

George Stafford Eckhardt (18 April 1912 – 7 September 1995) was a United States Army Major general who served in World War II, the Korean War and the Vietnam War.

== Military career ==
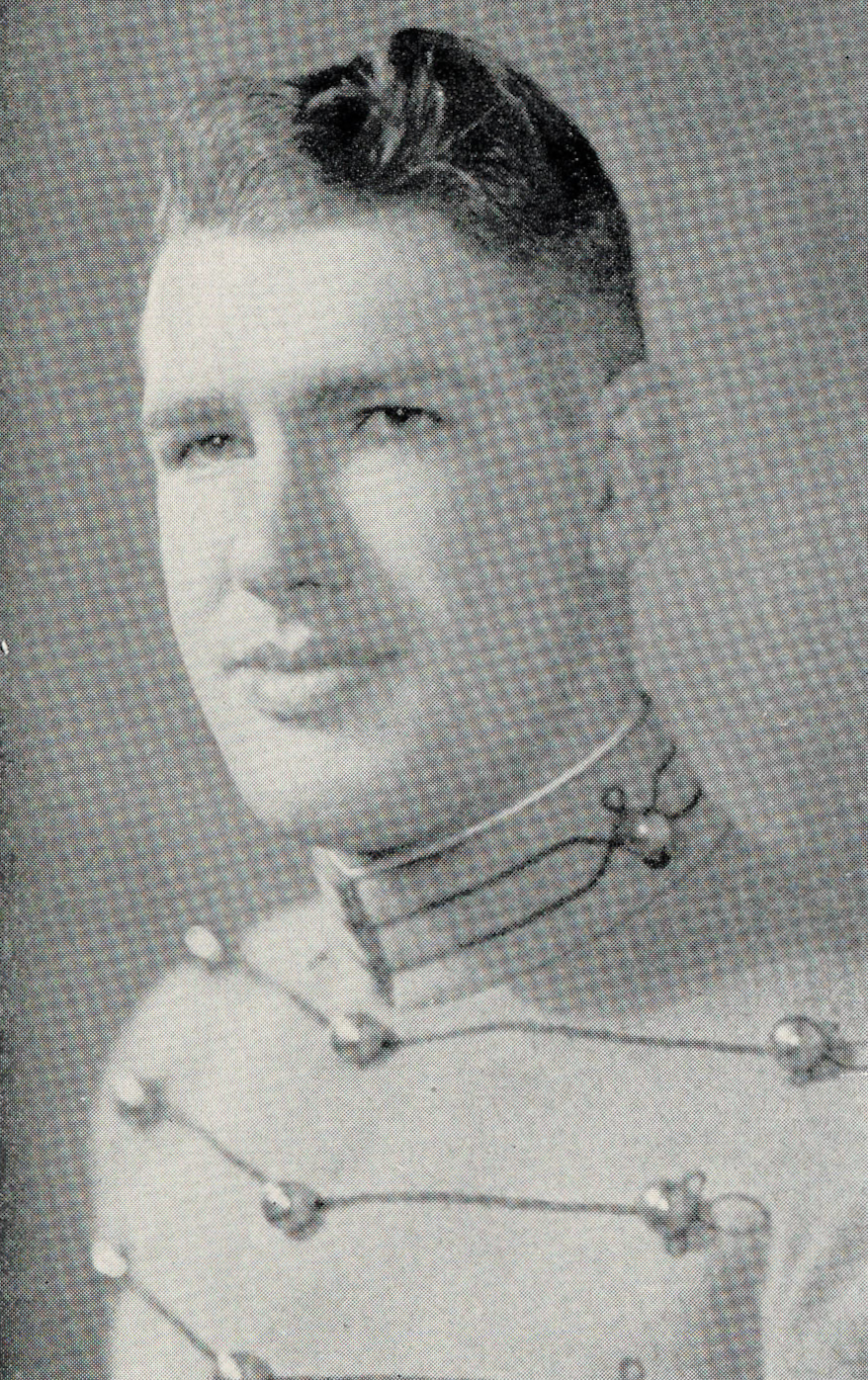
Eckhardt as a West Point cadet in 1935

He attended West Point in the class of 1935.

In December 1966 he commanded the 9th Infantry Division and deployed it to South Vietnam. He commanded the division in combat until June 1967 when he was assigned as Deputy Commanding General, II Field Force, Vietnam. In January 1968 he became the Commanding General of the Delta Military Assistance Command and Senior Advisor, IV Corps Tactical Zone, with headquarters in Cần Thơ, and remained in these positions until mid-1969.

From 7 July 1969 to 15 March 1971 he served as Commandant of the Army War College.

In April 1971 he returned to South Vietnam as Special Assistant to the Deputy Commander, Military Assistance Command, Vietnam, for Civil Operations and Revolutionary Development Support (CORDS).
