= Rowan Tink =

Australian recipient of the Bronze Star

Rowan John Tink
- Born: 1955 (age 70–71)
- Military career
- Allegiance: Australia
- Branch: Australian Army
- Service years: 1975–2006
- Rank: Colonel
- Unit: Special Air Service Regiment
- Commands: 51st Battalion, Far North Queensland Regiment
- Conflicts: War in Afghanistan: Operation Anaconda; Operation Sumatra Assist; Operation Astute
- Awards: Member of the Order of Australia; Bronze Star (United States)

Rowan John Tink AM (born 1955) is a former Australian Special Air Service Regiment officer whose identity was widely publicised after he was awarded the United States Bronze Star medal for "his outstanding contribution to the international coalition against terrorism's Operation Enduring Freedom" during his role commanding 150 SASR operators in Afghanistan, notably during Operation Anaconda. The medal was presented to Lieutenant Colonel Tink by Major General Frank Hagenbeck at a farewell ceremony at Bagram on 24 July 2002.

After leaving the ADF, Rowan Tink joined Tenix which was subsequently merged with BAE Systems.
