= William J. Lennox Jr. =

United States Army general

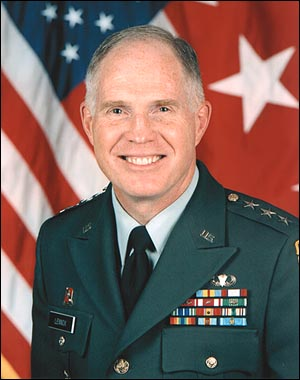
- Born: May 23, 1949 (age 77); Yonkers, New York, U.S.
- Alma mater: United States Military Academy (BS); Princeton University (PhD)
- Military career
- Allegiance: United States of America
- Branch: United States Army
- Service years: 1971–2006
- Rank: Lieutenant General
- Commands: Superintendent, United States Military Academy
- Awards: Defense Distinguished Service Medal; Distinguished Service Medal (2); Legion of Merit (5); Ranger Tab

Lieutenant General William James Lennox Jr. (born May 23, 1949) of Houston, Texas, was the 56th Superintendent of the United States Military Academy at West Point, New York from 2001 to 2006.

Lennox graduated with a B.S. in international affairs from the United States Military Academy in 1971, upon which he joined the U.S. Army as a field artillery officer with the rank of lieutenant.

Lennox served in a wide variety of field assignments, including as a Forward Observer, Executive Officer, and Fire Support Officer in the 1st Battalion, 29th Field Artillery, and as Commander, Battery B, 2d Battalion, 20th Field Artillery, 4th Infantry Division. He was the Operations Officer and Executive Officer for the 2d Battalion, 41st Field Artillery, 3d Infantry Division. He commanded the 5th Battalion, 29th Field Artillery in the 4th Infantry Division and the Division Artillery in the 24th Infantry Division. Lennox also served in a number of staff positions including White House Fellow, Special Assistant to the Secretary of the Army, and Executive Officer for the Deputy Chief of Staff for Operations and Plans. He served as Deputy Commanding General and Assistant Commandant of the U.S. Army Field Artillery Center; Chief of Staff for III Corps and Fort Hood; Assistant Chief of Staff, CJ-3, Combined Forces Command/United States Forces South Korea and Deputy Commanding General, U.S. Eighth Army; and Chief of Legislative Liaisons.

On June 9, 2006, Lennox relinquished command of West Point to his former West Point classmate, Franklin Hagenbeck.

Effective August 1, 2006, Lennox joined the Goodrich Corporation as a senior vice president.

On May 7, 2013, Princeton Power Systems appointed Lennox to its board of directors.

On January 13, 2014, Universal Technical Institute appointed Lennox to its board of directors.

On February 6, 2015, Saint Leo University announced Lennox as its 9th president, replacing Dr. Arthur F. Kirk Jr.

Lennox received a Ph.D. in English from Princeton University in 1982 after completing a doctoral dissertation titled "American war poetry."

His military education includes the Field Artillery Officer Basic Course, the Infantry Officer Advanced Course, as the distinguished graduate from the United States Army Command and General Staff College, and the Senior Service College Fellowship at Harvard University.

Lennox's awards include the Defense Distinguished Service Medal, the Distinguished Service Medal with oak leaf cluster, the Legion of Merit with four oak leaf clusters, the Meritorious Service Medal with one oak leaf cluster, the Army Commendation Medal with two oak leaf clusters, the Army Achievement Medal, the Korean Order of Military Merit (Inheon Medal), the Ranger Tab, the Parachutist Badge, and the Army Staff Identification.

- Defense Distinguished Service Medal
- Army Distinguished Service Medal
- Legion of Merit with four oak leaf clusters
- Meritorious Service Medal with one oak leaf cluster
- Army Commendation Medal two oak leaf clusters
- Army Achievement Medal
- Inheon Cordon Medal

Dr. Lennox now serves as Ambassador to Heroes' Mile veterans addiction services in Deland Florida.

Military offices
Preceded by Daniel W. Christman	Superintendent of the United States Military Academy; 2001–2006	Succeeded by Franklin L. Hagenbeck
Academic offices
Preceded by Arthur F. Kirk Jr.	President of Saint Leo University; 2015–2018	Succeeded by Jeffrey D. Senese
