= Howard D. Graves =

United States Army general

Howard Dwayne Graves
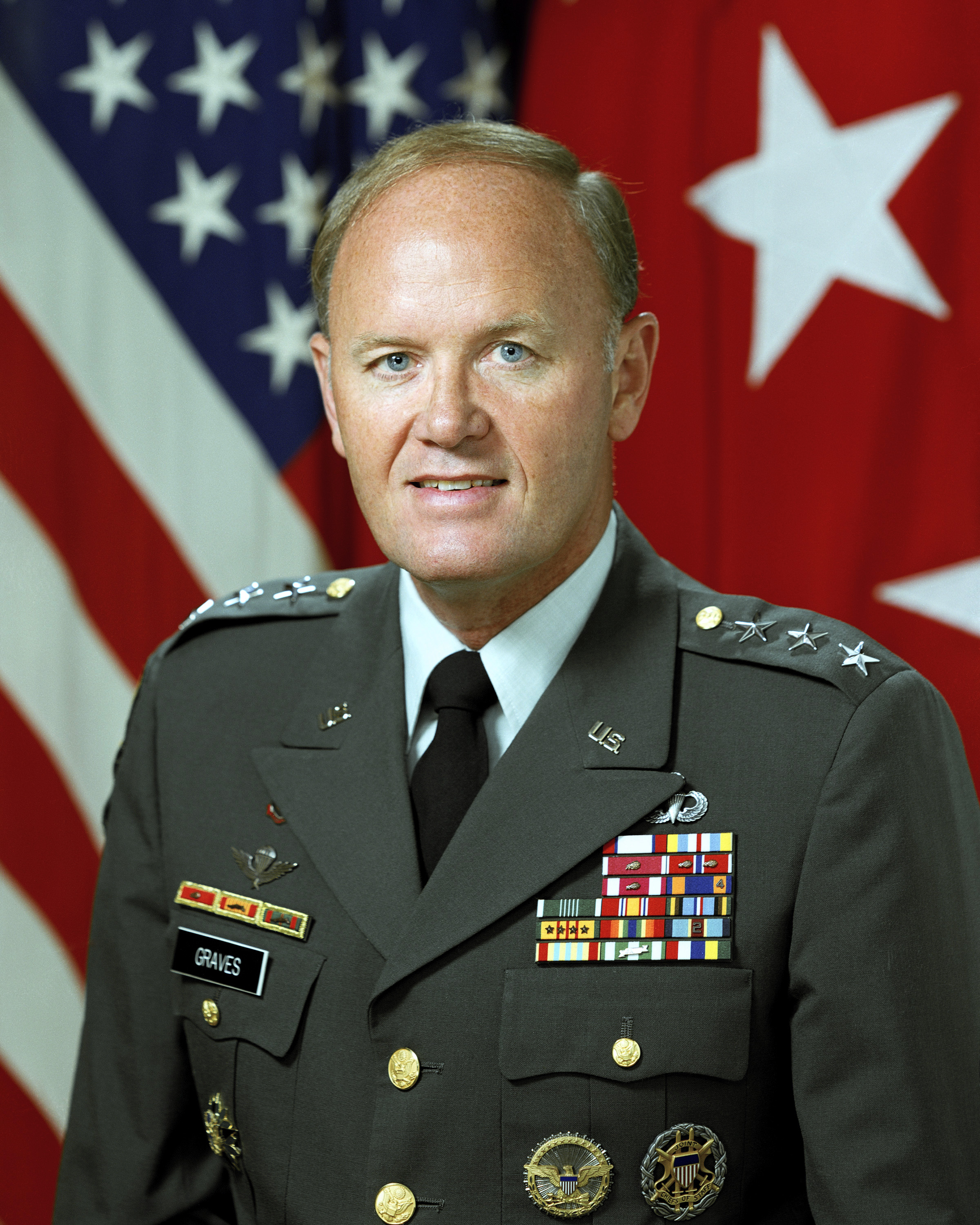
- Graves in August 1989
- Born: Howard Dwayne Graves; August 15, 1939; Roaring Springs, Texas, U.S.
- Died: September 13, 2003 (aged 64); College Station, Texas, U.S.
- Burial place: West Point Cemetery, West Point, New York, U.S.
- Military career
- Allegiance: United States of America
- Branch: United States Army
- Service years: 1961–1996
- Rank: Lieutenant general
- Unit: Corps of Engineers
- Commands: Superintendent of the United States Military Academy
- Conflicts: Invasion of Santo Domingo; Vietnam War
- Awards: Def. Distinguished Service Medal; Distinguished Service Medal (2); Legion of Merit (2); Bronze Star Medal (3); Meritorious Service Medal (2); Air Medal (4)
- Other work: Harry Guggenheim Foundation, Lyndon Baines Johnson School of Public Service, Texas A&M University System

Howard Dwayne Graves (August 15, 1939 – September 13, 2003) was a United States Army officer who served as the superintendent of the U.S. Military Academy from 1991 to 1996, and as the chancellor of the Texas A&M University System from 1999 to 2003. A 1961 graduate of West Point, he was a Rhodes Scholar, earning three degrees from Oxford during his army career. During his service in the Army, he was the personal aide to two Chairman of the Joint Chiefs of Staff; Admiral William J. Crowe and General Colin L. Powell.

== Early life and education ==
Graves was born in Roaring Springs, Texas, the only child of Tommy J. and Velma Lee Clifton Graves. He almost drowned trying to baptise a cat in a pond behind their home but was revived at a Civilian Conservation Corps camp that was close to their rural home. After spending his youth in Amarillo, Texas, and graduating from Amarillo High School in 1957, Graves received an appointment to West Point as a member of the class of 1961. Upon graduation, he was commissioned as a second lieutenant in the Engineer branch in 1961. He earned a Rhodes Scholarship and spent the first three years of his military career at the University of Oxford, graduating with a Bachelor of Arts degree in 1964, an MA in 1968 and an MLitt in 1971.

== Career ==
On returning to the United States after his first tour at the University of Oxford, he joined the 82nd Airborne Division, where in 1965 he commanded an engineer company in the Dominican Republic. He saw combat in Vietnam from 1968 to 1969, where he was an Engineer Battalion S-3 and assistant division engineer for the First Cavalry Division. After his second tour at the University of Oxford, Graves returned to West Point in 1970. He was assigned to the Department of Social Sciences, where he taught international relations and comparative foreign governments.

In 1974, Graves was appointed military assistant to the Secretary of Defense, James Schlesinger. His duties included coordinating Schlesinger's travel and public appearances, preparing briefings and speeches for Congressional hearings, and providing counsel on matters affecting the U.S. Army. In 1976, Graves took command of the 54th Engineer Battalion in West Germany, returning to the United States in 1978 to attend the Army War College at Carlisle Barracks, Pennsylvania. In 1980, Graves took command of the 20th Engineer Brigade. He then joined the First Infantry Division in 1982 as the assistant division commander. The next year, Graves was appointed deputy chief of staff, engineer, U.S. Army Forces Command. In 1984, Graves was promoted to brigadier general and became deputy director for strategy, plans, and policy, of the Army Staff. The next year he was promoted to vice director of the Joint Staff. In 1987, Graves succeeded James E. Thompson Jr. as commandant of the Army War College. Lieutenant General Graves then returned to Washington, D.C., to become assistant to the chairman, Joint Chiefs of Staff. In 1991, Graves was appointed the 54th superintendent of the United States Military Academy, a position he held until his retirement in 1996.

== Later life and death ==
Graves later joined the Harry Guggenheim Foundation as a director and in 1998 was a visiting professor, at the Lyndon Baines Johnson School of Public Service at the University of Texas. In 1999, he was selected to be the 11th chancellor of the Texas A&M University System. During his tenure as chancellor, Texas A&M added three new universities to its system: Texas A&M University–San Antonio, Tarleton State University–Central Texas in Killeen, and West Texas A&M University in Canyon, Texas. Graves lived with cancer for several years, dying from the disease at his home in College Station, Texas, on September 13, 2003. He is survived by his wife, Gracie Newman Graves, son, Colonel Gregory Howard Graves, who is also a graduate of West Point (class of 1988), and wife Wya Graves, daughter Gigi Graves Kail and husband the late Colonel Eric Kail, who was an army officer. He is interred at the West Point Cemetery.

== Awards and decorations ==
U.S. military decorations
Defense Distinguished Service Medal
Army Distinguished Service Medal (with oak leaf cluster)
Defense Superior Service Medal
Legion of Merit (with oak leaf cluster)
Bronze Star (with two bronze oak leaf clusters)
Meritorious Service Medal (with oak leaf cluster)
Air Medal (with bronze award numeral 4)
Army Commendation Medal
U.S. and foreign unit awards
Meritorious Unit Commendation (with bronze oak leaf cluster)
South Vietnamese Gallantry Cross Unit Citation
South Vietnamese Civil Actions Citation
U.S. service (campaign) medals and service and training ribbons
National Defense Service Medal (with bronze service star)
Armed Forces Expeditionary Medal
Vietnam Service Medal with four service stars
Army Service Ribbon
Army Overseas Service Ribbon
International and Foreign Awards
Inter-American Defense Board Medal
Vietnam Armed Forces Honor Medal 1st Class
Vietnam Campaign Medal

Other Accoutrements
Master Parachutist Badge
Vietnam Parachutist Badge
Office of the Joint Chiefs of Staff Identification Badge
Office of the Secretary of Defense Identification Badge
Army Staff Identification Badge
82nd Airborne Division combat patch
United States Army Corps of Engineers Distinctive Unit Insignia

Military offices
Preceded by James E. Thompson Jr.	Commandant of the Army War College; 1987–1989	Succeeded by Paul G. Cerjan
Preceded by Dave Richard Palmer	Superintendents of the United States Military Academy; 1991–1996	Succeeded by Daniel W. Christman
Academic offices
Preceded by Barry B. Thompson	Chancellor of the Texas A&M University System; 1999–2003	Succeeded by Arthur Benton Cocanougher
