= Franklin L. Hagenbeck =

US Army general

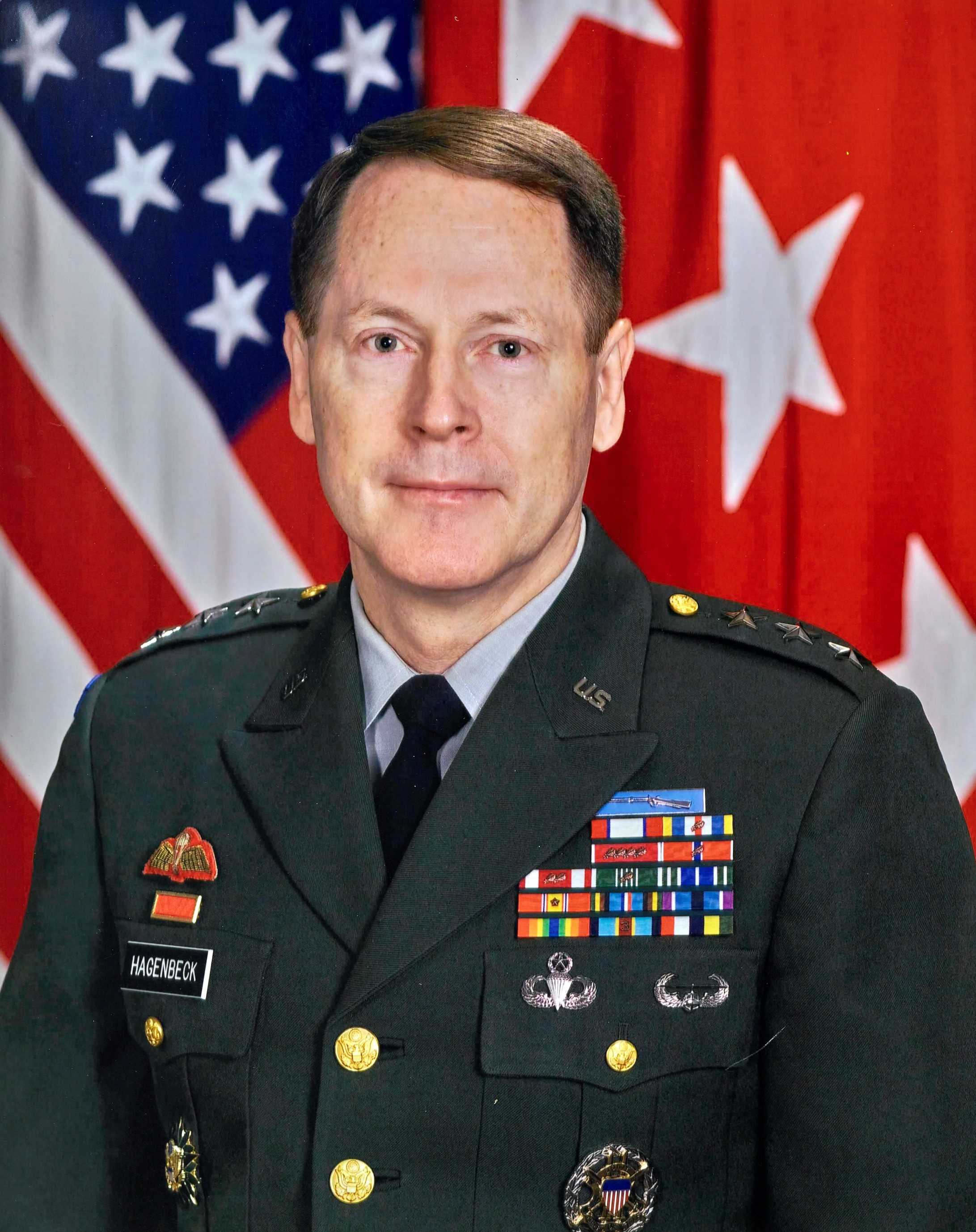
- Hagenbeck in 2006

57th Superintendent of the United States Military Academy
- In office June 9, 2006 – July 18, 2010
- President: George W. Bush; Barack Obama
- Preceded by: William J. Lennox, Jr.
- Succeeded by: David H. Huntoon

Personal details
- Born: November 25, 1949 (age 76) Morocco
- Education: United States Military Academy (BS); Long Island University (MBA)
- Nickname: "Buster"
- Military career
- Allegiance: United States
- Branch: United States Army
- Service years: 1971–2010
- Rank: Lieutenant General
- Commands: United States Military Academy; 10th Mountain Division
- Conflicts: War in Afghanistan
- Awards: Army Distinguished Service Medal; Defense Superior Service Medal (2); Legion of Merit (5); Bronze Star Medal (2)

Lieutenant General Franklin Lee Hagenbeck (born November 25, 1949) is a retired United States Army officer who served as the 57th Superintendent of the United States Military Academy from June 2006 to July 2010. Previous to his assignment at West Point, he was the Deputy Chief of Staff, G-1 United States Army, Washington, D.C.

== Early life and education ==
Hagenbeck was born in Morocco to a United States Navy family. He attended high school in Jacksonville, Florida, and was commissioned from the U.S. Military Academy in 1971. Later, at Florida State University, he earned a Master of Science degree in exercise physiology and served as an assistant football coach. While assigned to the U.S. Military Academy's Department of Physical Education, he earned a Master of Business Administration degree from Long Island University. Hagenbeck's military education includes the United States Army War College, Army Command and General Staff College, and the Infantry Officer Advanced Course.

== Military career ==
Hagenbeck commanded at every level from company through division, culminating as Commanding General of the 10th Mountain Division (2001–2003). He also served in the 25th Infantry Division, 101st and 82nd Airborne Divisions, and United States Army Training and Doctrine Command.

On July 24, 2002, Hagenbeck awarded Colonel Rowan Tink of the Special Air Service Regiment the Bronze Star Medal for his role in Operation Anaconda.

Before becoming Superintendent, Hagenbeck served as the Army's Deputy Chief of Staff, G-1, and in numerous staff positions, including Chief of Staff, 10th Mountain Division; Director, Officer Personnel Management Directorate, United States Total Army Personnel Command; and Assistant Division Commander (Operations), 101st Airborne Division.

Hagenbeck served in numerous Joint assignments, including Exchange Officer and Tactics Instructor to the Royal Australian Infantry Center; deputy director for Politico-Military Affairs; Strategic Plans and Policy Directorate (J5); and deputy director for Current Operations, J33, Joint Staff. General Hagenbeck served as Commander, Coalition Task Force Mountain, Operations Enduring Freedom/Anaconda and Deputy Commanding General, Combined Joint Task Force 180 in Afghanistan. Hagenbeck retired in July 2010.

Hagenbeck's command during Operation Anaconda was criticized. Accusations included planning lapses that allegedly allowed top Taliban and al Qaeda leaders to escape into Pakistan. Hagenback defended himself, arguing that the operation had been overly dependent on USAF fixed-wing aircraft that he believed could not offer as much protection as United States Army rotarcraft and artillery. However, United States Air Force officials alleged that Hagenbeck and other United States Army officers who plotted the operation left them out of crucial planning, and Hagenback himself later retracted his criticisms of the operation.

== Awards and decorations ==
Hagenbeck's decorations include:

- Army Distinguished Service Medal
- Defense Superior Service Medal with one oak leaf cluster
- Legion of Merit with four oak leaf clusters
- Bronze Star Medal with one oak leaf cluster
- Meritorious Service Medal with two oak leaf clusters
- Army Commendation Medal with one oak leaf cluster
- Army Achievement Medal

Badges

- Air Assault Badge
- Master Parachutist Badge
- The Expert Infantryman Badge
- Australian, British, and Honduran Airborne Wings
- The Joint Chiefs of Staff Identification Badge
- The Army Staff Identification Badge.

Military offices
Preceded by James L. Campbell	Commander, 10th Mountain Division; 2001–2003	Succeeded by Lloyd Austin
Preceded by William J. Lennox, Jr.	57th Superintendent of the United States Military Academy; 2006–2010	Succeeded by David H. Huntoon
