= Dave Richard Palmer =

United States Army general (born 1934)

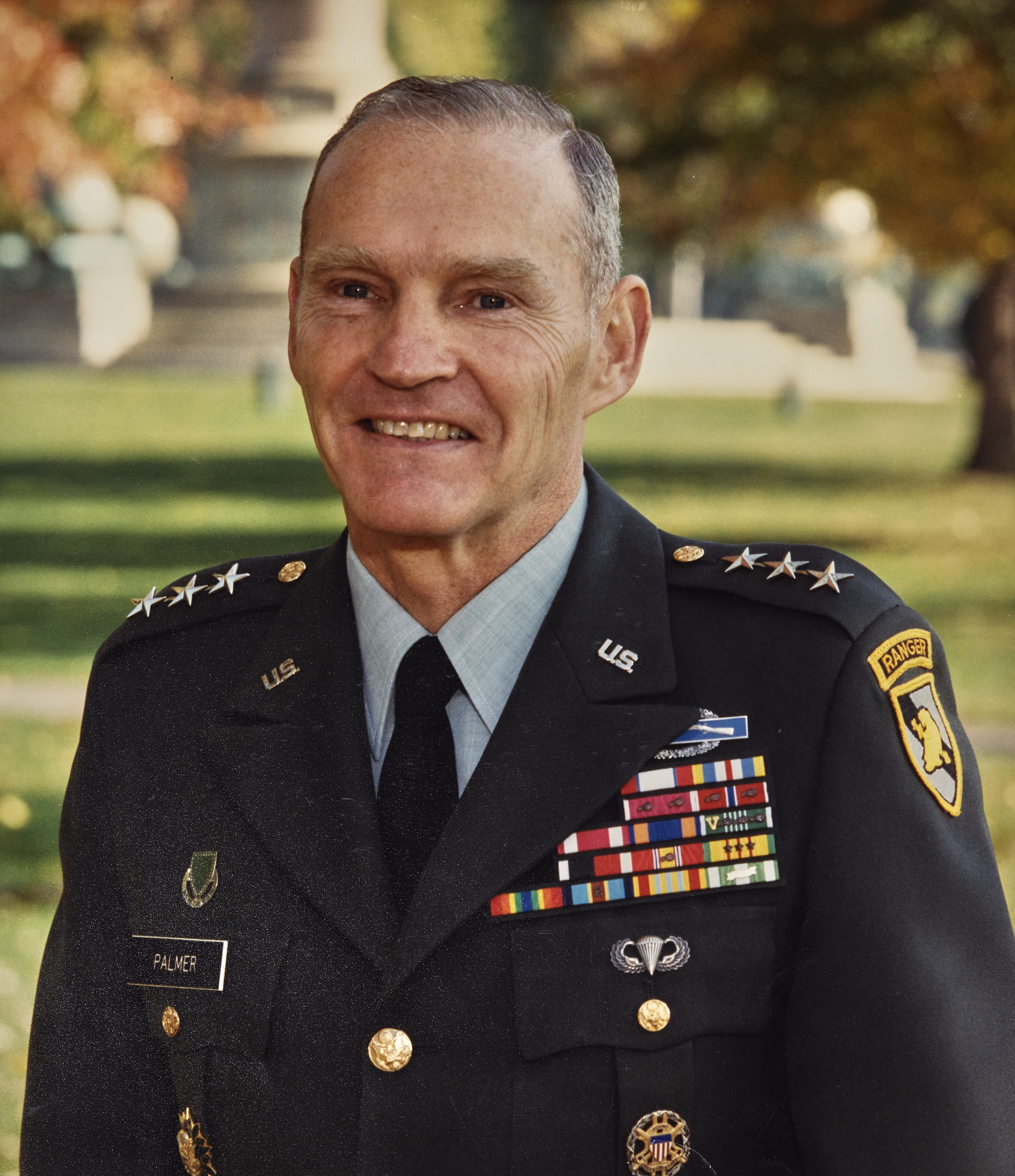
- Dave Richard Palmer
- Born: May 31, 1934 (age 92); Ada, Oklahoma, U.S.
- Military career
- Allegiance: United States of America
- Branch: United States Army
- Service years: 1956–1991
- Rank: Lieutenant General
- Commands: Superintendent, United States Military Academy
- Conflicts: Vietnam
- Awards: Distinguished Service Medal; Defense Superior Service Medal; Legion of Merit; Bronze Star; Air Medal
- Other work: George Washington and Benedict Arnold: A Tale of Two Patriots

Dave Richard Palmer (born May 31, 1934) is a retired United States Army Lieutenant General who served as the 53rd Superintendent of the United States Military Academy (1986–1991). He was also a military historian and author, and former President of Walden University. A 1956 graduate of West Point, he served two tours in the Vietnam War and held numerous command positions during the height of the Cold War. He taught courses at both West Point and the Vietnamese National Military Academy.

== Early life and education ==
Palmer was born in Ada, Oklahoma, on May 31, 1934. He grew up in New York and Texas. He received his appointment to West Point academy from Texas and graduated 37th in his class in 1956. He was commissioned a second lieutenant in the armor branch and embarked on a military career that spanned the Cold War era. During his military career, Palmer received a master's degree in history from Duke University.

== Military career ==
Palmer's initial assignment was as an armor officer in Berlin. He commanded a tank company in the 1st Armored Division, and would later command that same division. From 1969 to 1971, he commanded the 2nd Battalion, 33rd Armor in the 3rd Armored Division. His brigade command was of the 1st Brigade, 2nd Armored Division, Fort Hood, Texas, from 1976 to 1977. His career saw two tours in Vietnam; one of these consisted of serving on the faculty at the Vietnamese National Military Academy.

Palmer's staff and academic assignments included a tour as an instructor in the Department of Military Art and Engineering at West Point where he wrote The River and the Rock in 1969. He also served as the Deputy Commandant of the Army Command and General Staff College. He also served multiple assignments with the Joints Chiefs of Staff and Army staff at the Pentagon.

== Decorations ==
- Army Distinguished Service Medal
- Defense Superior Service Medal
- Legion of Merit
- Bronze Star
- Air Medal
- |Vietnam Service Medal with three bronze service stars

== Civilian career ==
Upon completing his tour as West Point Superintendent, Palmer retired from the Army in 1991. He joined the Board of Directors of Walden University the following year. From 1995 to 1999, he served as president of the university, where he pioneered distance learning methods. Under Palmer's leadership, enrollment at the university doubled, and now has more than 10,000 students. From 1999 to 2000, he was Chief Executive Officer of Walden e-Learning, Incorporated.

Palmer was also a prolific author throughout his career and is recognized as a premier military historian.

== Bibliography ==
- River and the Rock: The History of Fortress West Point 1775-1783
- The Way of the Fox; American Strategy in the War for America, 1775-1783 (Greenwood Press, 1975) ISBN 0837175313
- Summons of Trumpet: US-Vietnam in Perspective (Presidio Press, 1978) ISBN 0891410414
- Early American Wars and Military Institutions (Avery Pub. Group, 1986) ISBN 0895292645
- 1794: America, Its Army, and the Birth of the Nation (Presidio Press, 1994) ISBN 0891415238
- George Washington and Benedict Arnold: A Tale of Two Patriots (Regnery Pub., 2006) ISBN 1596980206
- George Washington's Military Genius (Regnery Pub., 2012) ISBN 9781596987913

Military offices
Preceded by Willard Warren Scott, Jr.	Superintendents of the United States Military Academy; 1986–1991	Succeeded by Howard D. Graves
