= Daniel W. Christman =

Daniel William Christman
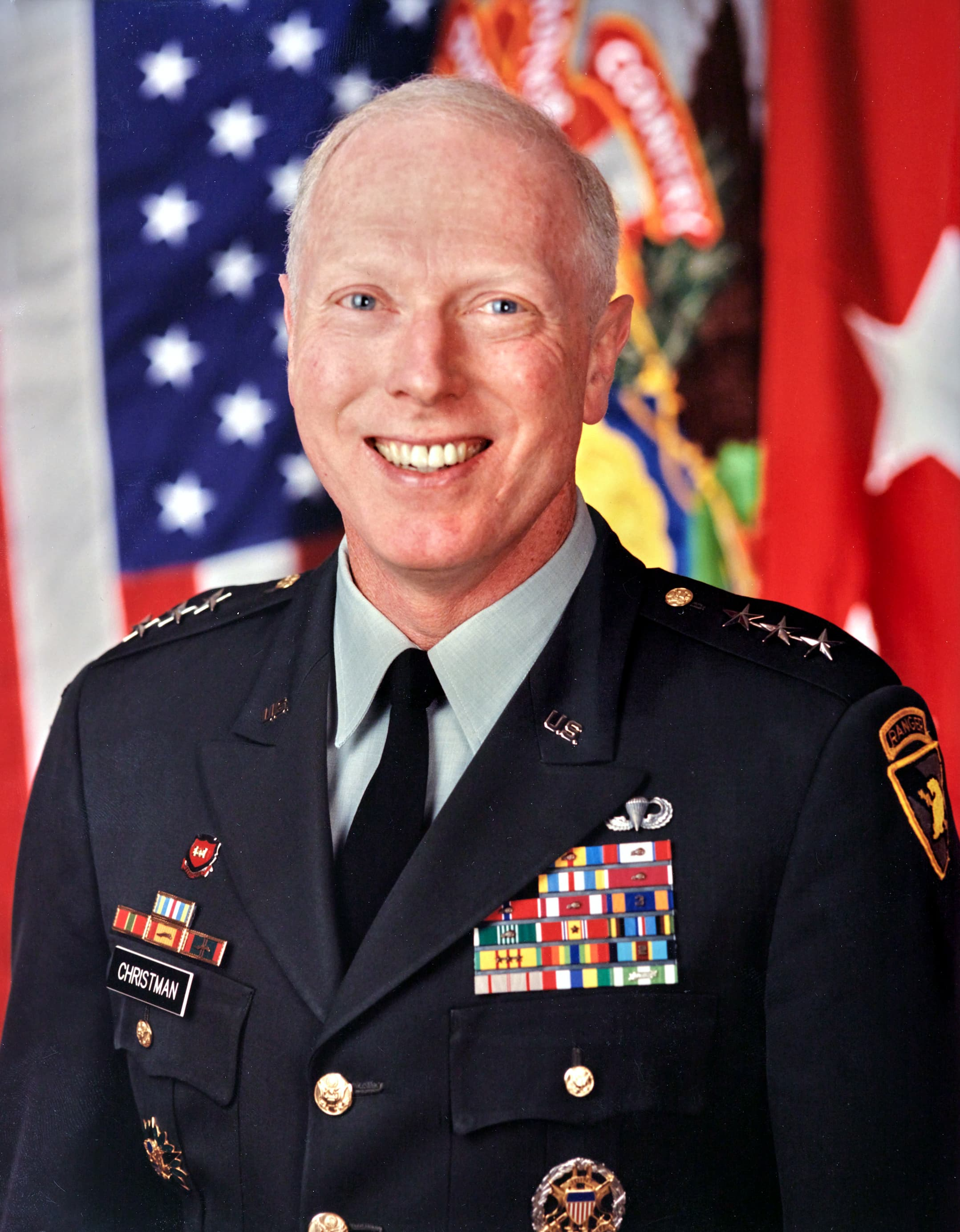
- Daniel W. Christman
- Born: May 5, 1943 (age 83); Youngstown, Ohio, U.S.
- Military career
- Allegiance: United States of America
- Branch: United States Army
- Service years: 1965–2001
- Rank: Lieutenant General
- Unit: US Army Corps of Engineers
- Commands: Superintendent, United States Military Academy
- Conflicts: Vietnam War
- Awards: Defense Distinguished Service Medal (4); Distinguished Service Medal (2); Defense Superior Service Medal; Legion of Merit (2); Bronze Star (2); Air Medal (3)
- Other work: Senior Vice President for International Affairs, U.S. Chamber of Commerce

Daniel William Christman (born May 5, 1943) is a retired United States Army lieutenant general, former Superintendent of the United States Military Academy (1996–2001), and served as the Senior Vice President for International Affairs, U.S. Chamber of Commerce. A 1965 graduate of West Point, he went on to earn multiple post-graduate degrees and hold numerous commands during his army career. Christman served in highly visible and strategically important positions and four times was awarded the Defense Distinguished Service Medal, the nation's highest peacetime service award.

== Early life and education ==
Born in Youngstown, Ohio and raised in Hudson, Ohio, Christman attended Western Reserve Academy for high school and graduated first in his class from West Point in 1965. He holds master's degrees in civil engineering and public affairs from Princeton University (June 1969) and graduated with honors from George Washington University law school in 1986. He is also a graduate of the Army Command and General Staff College in June 1974 and the National War College in June 1983. He is a member of the Pennsylvania and Washington, D.C., bar associations and is also a member of the Council on Foreign Relations. He is a graduate of the Army Ranger School in November 1965 and the Airborne School.

== Military command positions ==
Christman's military career included company commands with the 2nd Engineer Battalion, Changpo-Ri, Korea (1966), and the 326th Engineer Battalion, Hue, Vietnam (1969–1970). His battalion command was with the 54th Engineer Battalion in Wildflecken, Germany (1980–1982). He commanded the Savannah District, U.S. Army Corps of Engineers in Savannah, Georgia, (1984–1986). He then was the Commanding General, U.S. Army Engineer Center and Fort Leonard Wood and Commandant, U.S. Army Engineer School, Fort Leonard Wood, Mo. (1991–1993). Christman served as the 19th U.S. Representative to the NATO Military Committee, Brussels, Belgium (1993–1994) before taking command at the United States Military Academy as the 55th Superintendent (1996–2001).

== Major military staff positions ==
Christman's major staff assignments involved service as Staff Assistant with National Security Council, the White House (1975–1976). He was a Staff Officer in the Office of the Deputy Chief of Staff for Operations, Department of the Army, Washington, D.C. (1976–1978). In both of these assignments, Christman was responsible for advising the Army Chief of Staff and senior staff on the Strategic Arms Limitation Talks (SALT). He was also called upon to testify before the House Select Committee on intelligence regarding Soviet compliance with earlier arms control agreements. Christman also served for 21 months as Assistant to the Chairman of the Joint Chiefs of Staff General John M. Shalikashvili. In this capacity, he supported Secretary of State Warren Christopher as a member of the Middle East Peace Negotiating Team and in arms control negotiations with the Russian Federation. Additionally, Christman served for a year and a half as Army adviser to the Chairman of the Joint Chiefs of Staff, Admiral William J. Crowe, and then as Assistant to the Attorney General of the United States for National Security Affairs. Christman also served as Director of Strategy, Plans and Policy in Department of Army Headquarters, Washington, D.C. His duties in this assignment focused on negotiations relating to the Conventional Forces in Europe (CFE) arms control talks between NATO and the Warsaw Pact. In the course of supporting these negotiations on behalf of the Chief of Staff of the Army and the chairman, JCS, Christman briefed former President Bush and traveled to Europe to brief allied heads of state and the NATO Secretary General.

== Decorations ==
- Defense Distinguished Service Medal with three oak leaf clusters
- Army Distinguished Service Medal with oak leaf cluster
- Defense Superior Service Medal
- Legion of Merit with oak leaf cluster
- Bronze Star with oak leaf cluster
- Air Medal with two oak leaf clusters

== Post military ==
Christman has appeared as a military analyst for CNN International during Operation Iraqi Freedom. He is a frequent contributor to CNN, and has also appeared on ABC, Fox, MSNBC, CNBC, and C-SPAN to discuss defense and national security issues. Christman has written and lectured extensively on leadership and national defense, including the ongoing war against international terrorism. Christman was appointed to the board of directors of the Ultralife Corporation of Newark, New York, in August 2001. He served as Senior Vice President International Affairs for the U.S. Chamber of Commerce starting in June 2003, and was previously the executive director of the Kimsey Foundation in Washington, D.C. He also serve as a director of United Services Automobile Association, an insurance mutual corporation, and Entegris, Inc., a semi-conductor equipment manufacturer, and on the American Security Project's board of directors.

Military offices
Preceded by Howard D. Graves	Superintendents of the United States Military Academy; 1996–2001	Succeeded by William J. Lennox, Jr.
