= Burton D. Patrick =

United States Army general

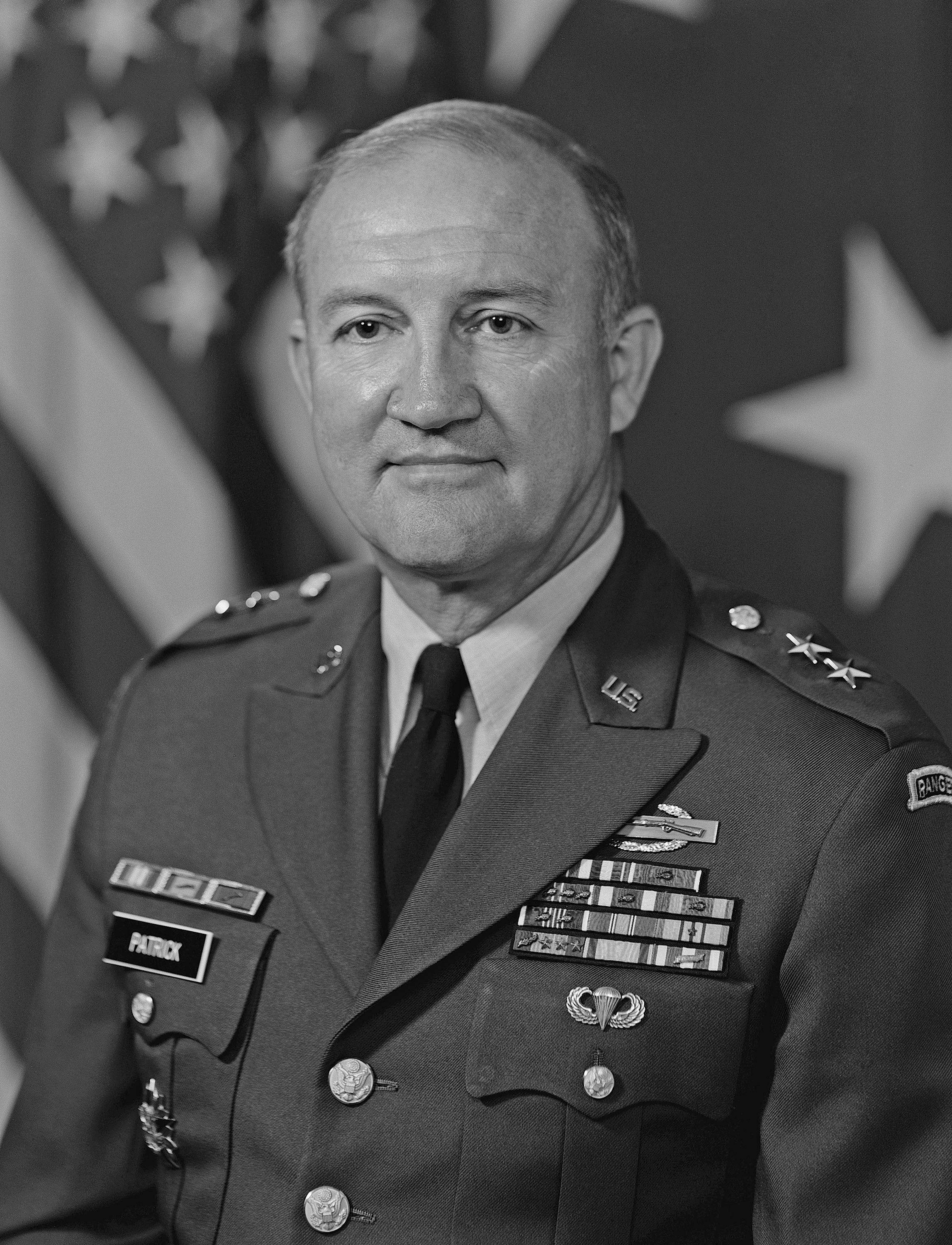
- Pictured in 1984 as major general
- Born: October 11, 1935 (age 91); Fickling, Georgia, U.S.
- Military career
- Allegiance: United States of America
- Branch: United States Army
- Service years: c.1957–c.1988
- Rank: Lieutenant general
- Nickname: Pat
- Commands: 101st Airborne Division
- Conflicts: Vietnam War

Burton DeWayne Patrick (born October 11, 1935) is a retired lieutenant general in the United States Army. He is a former commander of the 101st Airborne Division. During the Vietnam War, he was Special Forces Advisor to the 42nd Vietnamese Ranger Battalion.

== Early life and education ==
The son of Walter and Ruby McElreath Patrick, Patrick was born in Fickling, Georgia on October 11, 1935. Patrick graduated from North Georgia College, now part of the University of North Georgia, at which time he received his Army commission through the Reserve Officer Training Corps (ROTC). He also received his master's degree from Shippensburg University. He married Patricia (Compton) Patrick and they had one son, Burton DeWayne Patrick, Jr, one granddaughter, Caitlin Edwards and one great-grandson, Oliver Edwards.

== Career ==
A Vietnam combat veteran, from 1972 to 1973 Patrick served at Fort Campbell, Kentucky as deputy Brigade Commander of the 101st Airborne Division's 1st Brigrade and later advanced to Commander of the 2nd Battalion, 502nd Infantry. He also served as assistant division commander for the 2nd Infantry Division in Korea.

After serving as chief of the Legislative Liaison Office of the Secretary of the Army in Washington, D.C., Patrick returned to Fort Campbell to begin his tenure as the 32nd commanding general of the 101st Airborne Division on June 18, 1985, replacing outgoing Major General James E. Thompson Jr. Patrick held command on December 12, 1985 when 248 soldiers of the 101st Division and 8 air crew members died in a plane crash at Gander, Newfoundland, International Airport, one of the worst accidents in aviation. Serving at Fort Campbell until May 20, 1987, Patrick moved to South Korea to become commanding general of the Combined Field Army between the United States and South Korea. He was also nominated for promotion to lieutenant general.

== Post-military ==
Upon his retirement from the army in 1988, Patrick served as the city administrator of Thomson, Georgia.
