= James E. Thompson Jr. =

United States Army general

James Edward Thompson Jr.
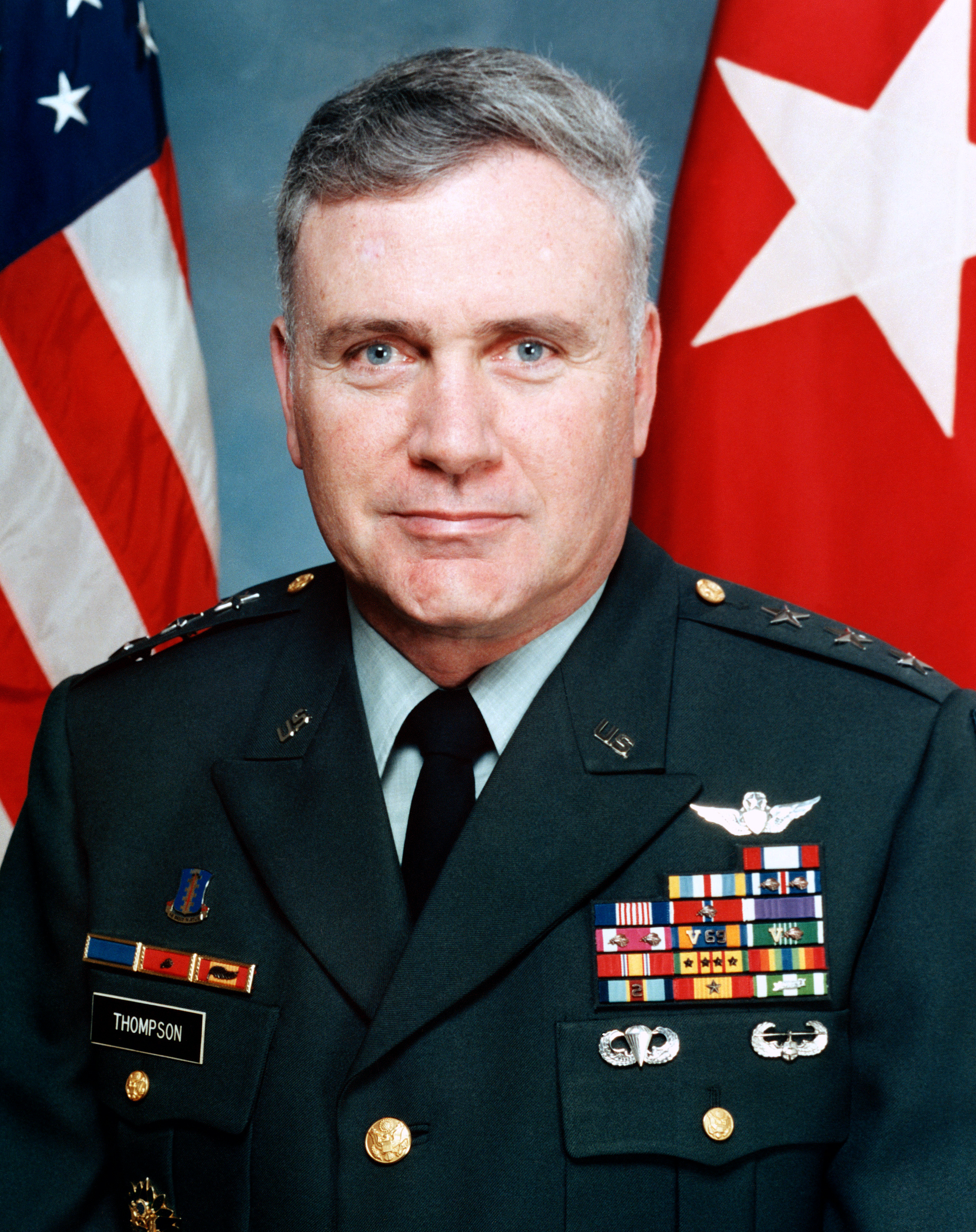
- Thompson in 1991
- Born: October 13, 1935; Durham, North Carolina, U.S.
- Died: June 8, 2017 (aged 81); Brunswick, Georgia, U.S.
- Burial place: Christ Church Episcopal Cemetery, St. Simons, Georgia, U.S.
- Military career
- Allegiance: United States
- Branch: United States Army
- Service years: 1957–1991
- Rank: Lieutenant General
- Commands: First United States Army; United States Army War College; 101st Airborne Division; 3d Brigade, 101st Airborne Division; 1st Battalion, 5th Infantry Regiment; 162nd Aviation Company (Assault Helicopter)
- Conflicts: Vietnam War
- Awards: Army Distinguished Service Medal; Defense Superior Service Medal; Distinguished Flying Cross (3); Soldier's Medal; Bronze Star Medal (2); Purple Heart

James Edward Thompson Jr. (October 13, 1935 – June 8, 2017) was a United States Army officer. He reached the rank of lieutenant general and was a commander of the 101st Airborne Division and First United States Army.

== Early life and education ==
James Edward Thompson Jr. was born in Durham, North Carolina on October 13, 1935, and graduated from the University of Florida in 1957 with a Bachelor of Arts in education. While in college, Thompson completed the Reserve Officers' Training Corps program, and at his graduation he was commissioned a second lieutenant of Infantry.

After receiving his commission, Thompson completed the Infantry Officer Basic Course. His later military education included the Infantry Officer Advanced Course, Air Command and Staff College, and United States Army War College. In addition, he received a Master of Arts in political science from Auburn University.

== Career ==
During the Vietnam War, Thompson commanded the 162nd Aviation Company (Assault Helicopter) during the first half of 1968. Thompson's later field grade officer assignments included: commander, 1st Battalion, 5th Infantry Regiment, 25th Infantry Division; assistant chief of staff for operations, plans and training (G-3), 25th Infantry Division; director, military planning studies (European regions), Army War College; and commander, 3d Brigade, 101st Airborne Division.

=== General officer ===
After receiving promotion to brigadier general, Thompson's assignments included: assistant division commander (ADC) for support and ADC for operations, 101st Airborne Division, Kentucky; deputy director for plans and policy, United States Pacific Command; and deputy director for operations, readiness, and mobilization in the Office of the Army's Deputy Chief of Staff for Operations (G-3).

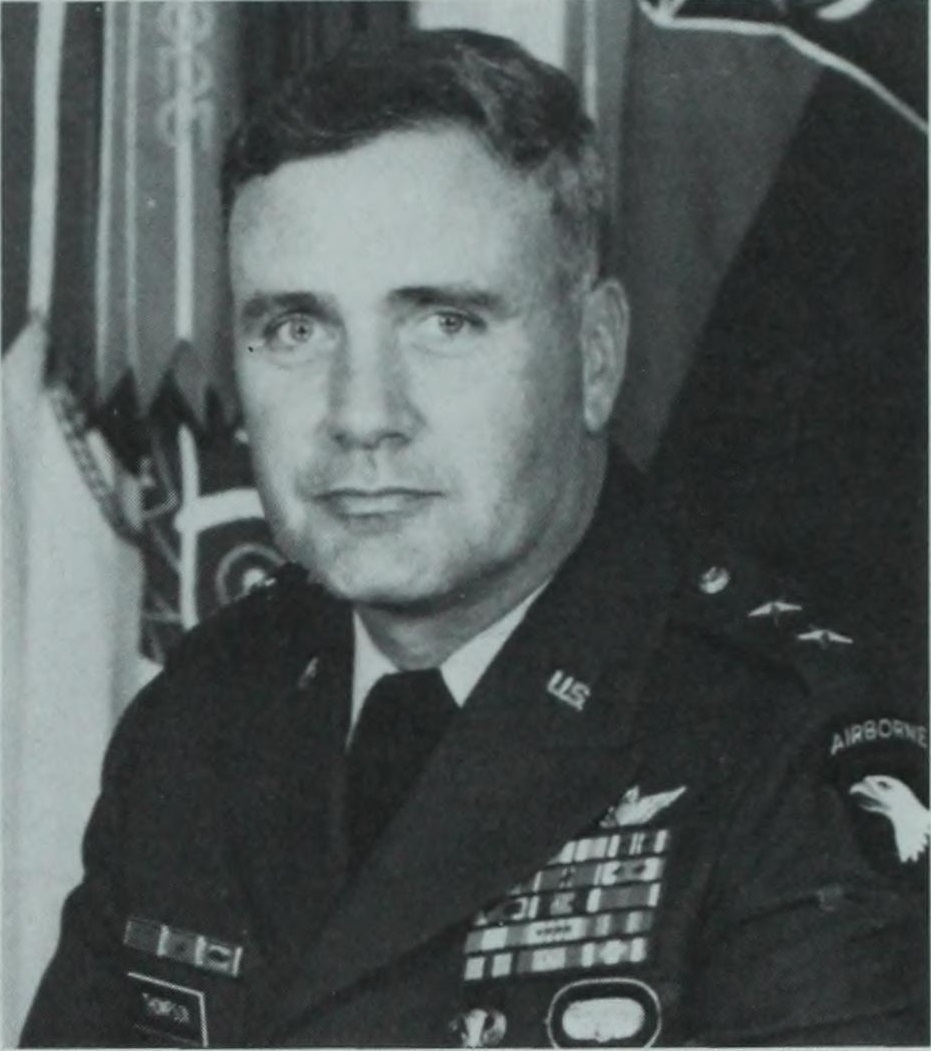
Thompson as commander of the 101st Airborne Division in 1985

Thompson was assigned as commander of the 101st Airborne Division in August 1983, and he served until June 1985. From 1985 to 1987, Thompson was commandant of the United States Army War College.

In June 1987, Thompson was assigned as commander of First United States Army; he held this position until retiring in 1991.

== Awards and decorations ==
Thompson's awards and decorations include:

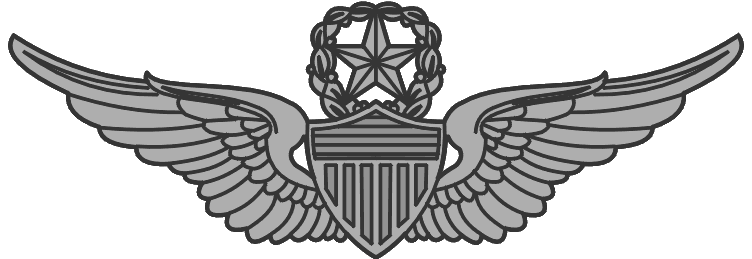
Master Army Aviator Badge
Basic Parachutist Badge
Air Assault Badge
Army Staff Identification Badge
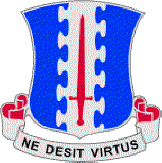
187th Infantry Regiment Distinctive Unit Insignia

Army Distinguished Service Medal
Defense Superior Service Medal
Distinguished Flying Cross with two bronze oak leaf clusters
Soldier's Medal
Bronze Star with oak leaf cluster
Purple Heart
Meritorious Service Medal with two oak leaf clusters
Air Medal with "V" device and bronze award numerals 65
Army Commendation Medal with V device and oak leaf cluster
Army Presidential Unit Citation
Meritorious Unit Commendation with oak leaf cluster
National Defense Service Medal with one bronze service star
Vietnam Service Medal with four service stars
Army Service Ribbon
Army Overseas Service Ribbon with award numeral 2
Vietnam Gallantry Cross with gold star
Vietnam Gallantry Cross Unit Citation
Vietnam Campaign Medal

== Family ==
Thompson was married to Patricia (Cofer) Thompson. They were the parents of two children, James and Tamara.

== Death and burial ==
In retirement, Thompson resided in St. Simons, Georgia. He died in Brunswick, Georgia on June 8, 2017. Thompson was buried at Christ Church Episcopal Cemetery in St. Simons.

== Sources ==
=== Books ===
- United States Army Adjutant General (1961). Official U.S. Army Register. Washington, DC: Headquarters, Department of the Army (via Ancestry.com). p. 536.
- Department of the Army, Deputy Chief of Staff for Personnel (May 15, 1985). Department of the Army Pamphlet 360-10, Army Executive Biographies. Headquarters, Department of the Army: Washington, DC. p. 437.

=== Internet ===
- Gause, Stan (2006). "The 162nd Aviation Company (Assault Helicopter), 1965–1972" (PDF). vhpa.org/. Grand Prairie, TX: Vietnam Helicopter Pilots Association. pp. 3, 24–29, 35.
- "Commandants of the U.S. Army War College, 1902–2015" (PDF). usawc.org/. Carlisle Barracks, PA: United States Army War College. 2015. p. 6. Archived from the original (PDF) on 2017-03-16.

=== Newspapers ===
- Barefoot, Wayne (June 19, 1985). "Screaming Eagles Known Over Globe, Chief Says". Nashville Tennessean. Nashville, TN. p. 11–A.
- Hermann, Peter (May 31, 1991). "New 1st Army Commander Offers Warning: Taking Charge, Johnson Tells Of Tough Times". Baltimore Sun. Baltimore, MD.
- "ROMEO group traveled to Fort Stewart". Coastal Illustrated. St. Simons, GA. April 13, 2016.
- "Obituary, James Edward Thompson Jr". The Brunswick News. Brunswick, GA. June 13, 2017.

Military offices
Preceded by Charles D. Franklin	Commanding General of the First United States Army; 1987–1991	Succeeded by James H. Johnson Jr.
Preceded by Thomas F. Healey	Commandant of the United States Army War College; 1985–1987	Succeeded by Howard D. Graves
Preceded by Charles W. Bagnal	Commanding General of the 101st Airborne Division; 1983–1985	Succeeded by Burton D. Patrick
