= Superintendent of the United States Military Academy =

United States Army general

Logo of the Military Academy

The superintendent of the United States Military Academy is the academy's commanding officer. This position is roughly equivalent to the chancellor or president of an American civilian university. The officer appointed is, by tradition, a graduate of the United States Military Academy, commonly known as "West Point". However, this is not an official requirement for the position.

The superintendency had often been a stepping stone to higher prominence in the Army. Four superintendents became Chief of Staff of the Army: Hugh Lenox Scott, Douglas MacArthur, Maxwell Davenport Taylor, and William Westmoreland. The list of superintendents includes five Medal of Honor recipients: Oliver Otis Howard, Douglas MacArthur, Albert Leopold Mills, John McAllister Schofield, John Moulder Wilson. Since the 1980s, the post has been a terminal assignment in the Army; as a condition for detail to the position, officers are required by law to acknowledge that they will retire at the end of their appointment. This formulation was meant to secure the independence of superintendents from unlawful command influence; however, in practice the resulting "lame duck" status restricts their power and influence in the Army. Since 2010, the army has considered reverting to the previous system or recalling a retired officer to fill the post. The mandatory retirement precedent was not followed when Darryl A. Williams was nominated in June 2022 to serve as Commanding General, United States Army Europe and Africa.

The billet carries the rank of lieutenant general, and is not counted against the Army's statutory limit on the number of active-duty officers above the rank of major general. For example, General Andrew Goodpaster originally retired from active duty as a full general, was recalled to assume the superintendency as a lieutenant general, and reverted to his four-star rank upon his second retirement.

== Superintendents ==
Note: "Class year" refers to the alumnus's class year, which usually is the same year they graduated. However, in times of war, classes often graduate early.
A "—" in the class year column indicates a superintendent who is not an alumnus of the academy.

#	Start	End	Name	Class year	Notability	References
1	1801	1803	Jonathan Williams	—	Colonel; Chief of Engineers; he vacated (rather than resigned) in June 1803, returning to the Superintendency in April 1805; elected to the Fourteenth United States Congress in 1815	
(acting)	1803	1805	Decius Wadsworth	—	Colonel; appointed 1st Chief of Ordnance in 1812; invented Wadsworth's cipher in 1817	
2	1805	1812	Jonathan Williams	—	Colonel; Chief of Engineers; he vacated (rather than resigned) in June 1803, returning to the Superintendency in April 1805; elected to the Fourteenth United States Congress in 1815	
3	1812	1814	Joseph Gardner Swift	1802	Brigadier general; first graduate of the Academy; Chief of Engineers	
4	1814	1817	Alden Partridge	1806	Captain; served as Acting Superintendent and Professor of Engineering; his administration was regarded as unsatisfactory and negligent to duties; when Sylvanus Thayer was appointed, Partridge refused to relinquish command and was court-martialed; he was sentenced to be cashiered in November 1817, and resigned from the Army in April 1818	
5	1817	1833	Sylvanus Thayer	1808	Brigadier general; "Father of West Point"; emphasized engineering; founded engineering schools; helped found the Academy's Association of Graduates; Sylvanus Thayer Award created by the Academy in his honor	
6	1833	1838	René Edward De Russy	1812	Brigadier general; military engineer; Union Army veteran	
7	1838	1845	Richard Delafield	1818	Major general; Chief of Engineers; American Civil War veteran; served as 7th, 11th, and 13th Superintendents	
8	1845	1852	Henry Brewerton	1819	Brigadier general; military engineer; Union Army veteran	
9	1852	1855	Robert E. Lee	1829	Colonel USA; graduated second in his class at the Academy, without demerits; son George Washington Custis Lee, class of 1854, graduated first in class; served in Confederate States Army ( 1861–1865); President, Washington and Lee University (1865–70)	
10	1855	1856	John Gross Barnard	1833	Major general; military engineer; Union Army veteran	
11	1856	1861	Richard Delafield	1818	Major general; Chief of Engineers; Union Army veteran; served as 7th, 11th, and 13th Superintendents	
12	1861	1861	Pierre Gustave Toutant (P.G.T.) Beauregard	1838	General CSA; military engineer; ordered the firing of shots at Fort Sumter, South Carolina that started the Civil War	
13	1861	1861	Richard Delafield	1818	Major general; Chief of Engineers; Union Army veteran; served as 7th, 11th, and 13th Superintendents	
14	1861	1864	Alexander Hamilton Bowman	1825	Lieutenant Colonel; military engineer; son Charles Stuart Bowman graduated from the Academy, class of 1860	
15	1864	1864	Zealous Bates Tower	1841	Major general; military engineer; Union Army veteran	
16	1864	1866	George Washington Cullum	1833	Brigadier general; military engineer; wrote Biographical Register of the Officers and Graduates of the U.S. Military Academy at West Point, N.Y. in 1891 and developed the Cullum number system	
17	1866	1871	Thomas Gamble Pitcher	1845	Brigadier general; veteran of Battle of Harper's Ferry, Mexican–American War, and the Civil War	
18	1871	1876	Thomas H. Ruger	1854	Major general; military engineer and lawyer; veteran of Civil War; military engineer and lawyer; military governor of Georgia (1868)	
19	1876	1881	John McAllister Schofield	1853	Lieutenant general; recipient of the Medal of Honor for his actions leading an attack at the Battle of Wilson's Creek; Superintendent of the Academy (1876–81); Commanding General of the United States Army (1888–95)	
20	1881	1882	Oliver Otis Howard	1854	Major general; recipient of the Medal of Honor for his actions leading an attack at the Battle of Seven Pines despite wounds which resulted in the loss of his right arm; led the campaign against Chief Joseph and the Nez Perce tribe; founder of Howard University	
21	1882	1887	Wesley Merritt	1860	Major general; veteran of the Civil War and Spanish–American War; first Military Governor of the Philippines	
22	1887	1889	John Parke	1849	Major general; military engineer; Union Army veteran	
23	1889	1893	John Moulder Wilson	1860	Brigadier general; recipient of the Medal of Honor for his actions at the Battle of Malvern Hill though acutely ill; Chief of Engineers (1897–1901)	
24	1893	1898	Oswald Herbert Ernst	1864	Major general; military engineer; Union Army and Spanish–American War veteran	
25	1898	1906	Albert Leopold Mills	1879	Major general; recipient of the Medal of Honor for continuing to lead his men at the Battle of San Juan Hill despite being shot in the head and temporarily blinded; appointed Superintendent to West Point by President McKinley, which carried automatic promotion from First Lieutenant to Colonel	
26	1906	1910	Hugh L. Scott	1876	Major general; learned to speak many western Native American languages; Chief of Staff of the Army (1914–17)	
27	1910	1912	Thomas Henry Barry	1877	Major general; cavalry and infantry officer; veteran of Indian Wars, China Relief Expedition, and Philippine–American War	
28	1912	1916	Clarence Page Townsley	1881	Major general; coastal artillery officer; commanded 30th Infantry Division during World War I	
29	1916	1917	John Biddle	1881	Major general; military engineer; World War I veteran	
30	1917	1919	Samuel Escue Tillman	1869	Brigadier general; recalled from retirement during World War I to serve as superintendent; refused to add military aviation to the curriculum; instructor at the Academy for more than 30 years; author of numerous books on chemistry and geology	
31	1919	1922	Douglas MacArthur	1903	General of the Army, Field Marshal in the Philippine Army; veteran of United States occupation of Veracruz; Second Battle of the Marne, Battle of Saint-Mihiel, Meuse-Argonne Offensive during World War I; commander of the 42nd Infantry Division; established Honor Code, and intramural sports at the U.S. Military Academy; brigade commander in the Philippine Division; commander of the Philippine Department; Chief of Staff of the United States Army (1930–35); recipient of the Medal of Honor for actions during the Battle of Bataan, commander of the South West Pacific Area during World War II; Supreme Commander of the Allied Powers during the Occupation of Japan; Korean War; grandson of Wisconsin Governor Arthur MacArthur Sr.; son of Lieutenant General and Medal of Honor recipient Arthur MacArthur Jr.	
32	1922	1925	Fred Winchester Sladen	1890	Major general; Superintendent of Fort McHenry National Monument (1931–32)	
33	1926	1927	Merch Bradt Stewart	1896	Brigadier general; infantry officer; Spanish–American War veteran; commander 175th Infantry Brigade during World War I	
34	1927	1928	Edwin Baruch Winans	1891	Major general; instructor at military schools; commended for leadership of the 10th Cavalry Regiment	
35	1929	1932	William Ruthven Smith	1892	Major general; artillery and infantry officer; commanded 36th Infantry Division during World War I	
36	1932	1938	William Durward Connor	1897	Major general; awarded two Silver Stars; Commandant of Army War College	
37	1938	1940	Jay Leland Benedict	1904	Major general; artillery and staff officer; Army General Staff during World War II	
38	1940	1942	Robert L. Eichelberger	1909	General; American Expeditionary Force Siberia; commanded Eighth United States Army in World War II	
39	1942	1945	Francis Bowditch Wilby	1905	Major general; Chief of Staff of First United States Army (1939–41)	
40	1945	1949	Maxwell Davenport Taylor	1922	General; developed the phrasing of the Cadet Honor Code at the Academy; commander of 101st Airborne Division (1944–45); Chief of Staff of the Army (1955–59); Chairman of the Joint Chiefs of Staff (1962–64); United States Ambassador to South Vietnam (1964–65)	
41	1949	1951	Bryant Edward Moore	August 1917	General; commanded 8th Infantry Division; killed in a helicopter crash on 24 February 1951 while commanding the IX Corps during the Korean War	
42	1951	1954	Frederick Augustus Irving	April 1917	Major general; commander 24th Infantry Division during World War II	
43	1954	1956	Blackshear M. Bryan	1922	Lieutenant general; commanded Prisoner of War Division for all the United States during World War II; commanded First United States Army (1957–60); his son, Blackshear M. Bryan Jr., class of 1954, was killed in Vietnam	
44	1956	1960	Garrison H. Davidson	1927	Lieutenant general; Academy football coach (1933–37); combat engineer during World War II and the Korean War; helped construct The Pentagon	
45	1960	1963	William Westmoreland	1936	General; Distinguished Eagle Scout; given the Pershing Sword for the most able cadet upon graduation from the Academy; commander 101st Airborne Division; commander Military Assistance Command, Vietnam (1964–68); Chief of Staff of the Army (1968–72)	
46	1963	1966	James Benjamin Lampert	1936	Lieutenant general; combat engineer during World War II; early pioneer of nuclear weapons and nuclear power, served as General Leslie Groves' executive officer as part of the Manhattan Project after World War II; his father, James G. B. Lampert, class of 1910 was killed in World War I	
47	1966	1969	Donald V. Bennett	1940	General; Director of the Defense Intelligence Agency (1969–72); commander United States Army Pacific (1972–74)	
48	1969	1970	Samuel William Koster	1942	Major general but demoted to brigadier general and denied a promotion to lieutenant general for covering up the My Lai Massacre	
49	1970	1974	William Allen Knowlton	January 1943	General; World War II and Vietnam War veteran; his daughter married General David Petraeus who was a cadet while Knowlton was Superintendent; Chief of Staff for United States European Command (1974–76)	
50	1974	1977	Sidney Bryan Berry	1948	Lieutenant general; Korean and Vietnam War veteran, wounded twice in Vietnam; Superintendent during the time women were first admitted to the Academy; Commissioner of Public Safety for the state of Mississippi (1980–84)	
51	1977	1981	Andrew Jackson Goodpaster	1939	General; 8th Infantry Division (1961–62); Supreme Allied Commander, Europe (1969–74); Commander in Chief of the United States European Command (CINCEUR) (1969–74); retired then became Superintendent, then retired a second time	
52	1981	1986	Willard Warren Scott Jr.	1948	Lieutenant general; commander 25th Infantry Division (1976–78); commander V Corps (1980–81)	
53	1986	1991	Dave Richard Palmer	1956	Lieutenant general; military historian; instructor at the Academy and the Vietnamese National Military Academy	
54	1991	1996	Howard D. Graves	1961	Lieutenant general; Rhodes Scholar; military engineer; Chancellor of the Texas A&M University System (1999–2003)	
55	1996	2001	Daniel William Christman	1965	Lieutenant general; graduated first in his class in 1965; Senior Vice President for International Affairs, U.S. Chamber of Commerce; four-time recipient of the Defense Distinguished Service Medal.	
56	2001	2006	William James Lennox Jr.	1971	Lieutenant general; artillery and staff officer; Deputy Commanding General Eighth United States Army; doctorate in literature from Princeton University	
57	2006	2010	Franklin Lee Hagenbeck	1971	Lieutenant general; commander 10th Mountain Division (2001–03)	
58	2010	2013	David H. Huntoon	1973	Lieutenant general; Director of the Army Staff; Former Commandant of the U.S. Army War College	
59	2013	2018	Robert L. Caslen	1975	Lieutenant general; chief of staff for Combined Joint Task Force-180 (CJTF-180) in Afghanistan from May through September 2002; Chief of the Office of Security Cooperation for Iraq	
60	2018	2022	Darryl A. Williams	1983	Lieutenant general; Managed U.S. response to the West African Ebola virus epidemic in 2016; Commander of NATO Allied Land Command (2016–2018); First black superintendent in the academy's history; Commanding General of United States Army Europe and Africa (2022–2024)	
61	2022	2026	Steven W. Gilland	1990	Lieutenant general; Academy's commandant of cadets (2017–2019), Commander of the 2nd Infantry Division (2019–2021)	
62	2026		James B. Bartholomees III	1995	Lieutenant general; Commander of the 25th Infantry Division (2025-2026)	

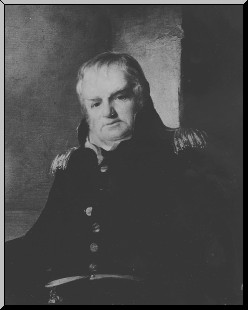
Jonathan Williams (1801–03), (1805–12)

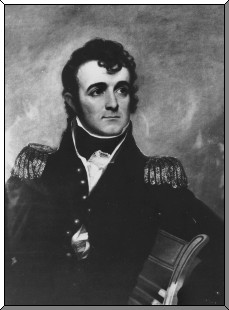
Joseph Swift (1812–14)

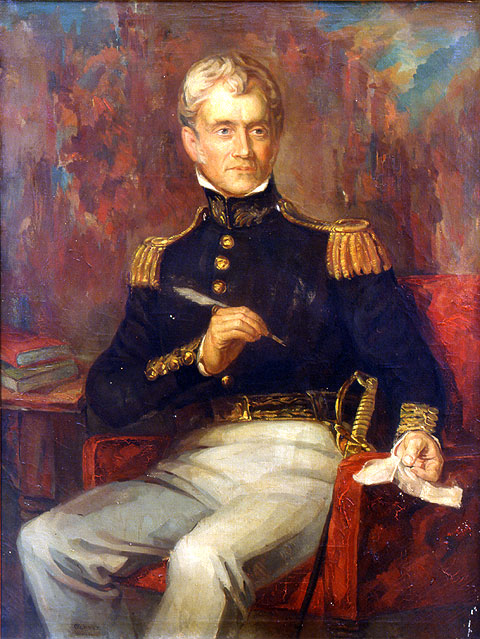
Sylvanus Thayer (1817–1833)

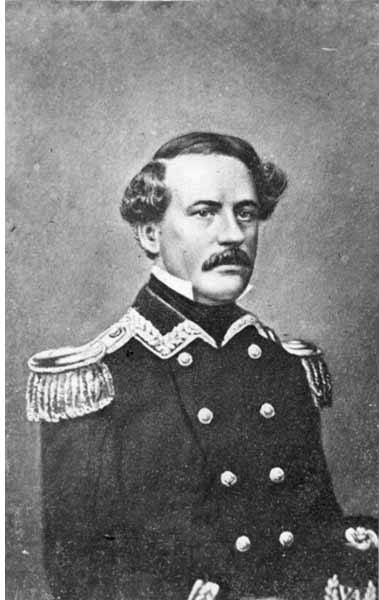
Robert E. Lee (1852–55)

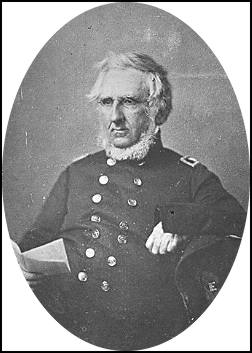
Richard Delafield (1856–61)

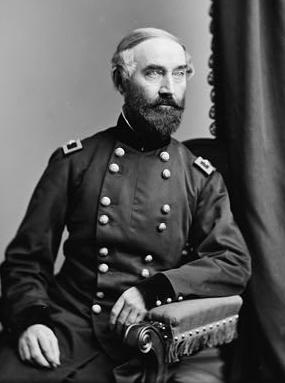
George Cullum (1864–66)

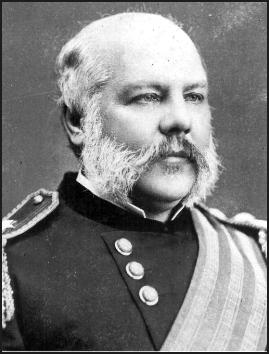
John Schofield (1876–81)

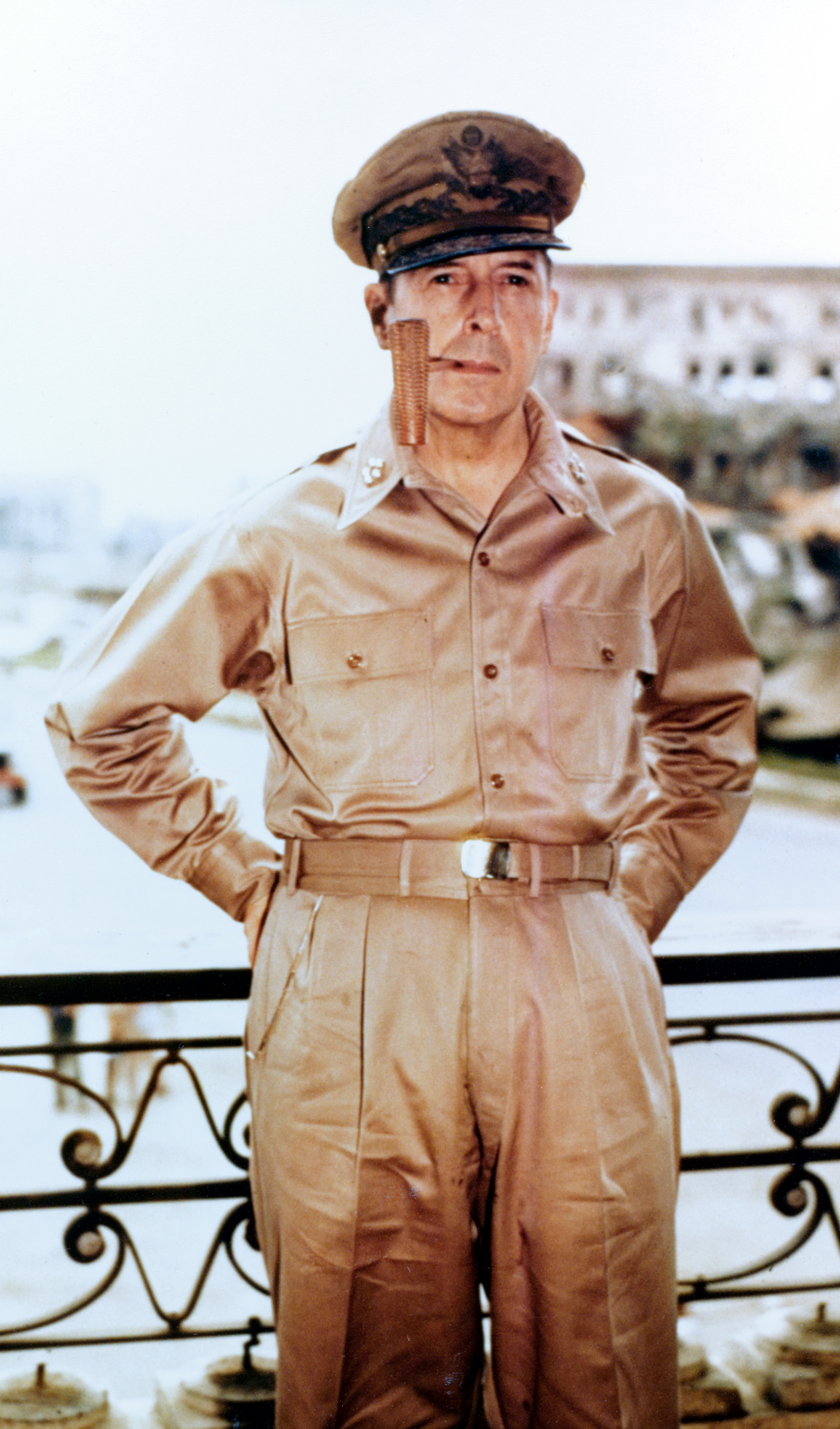
Douglas MacArthur (1919–22)

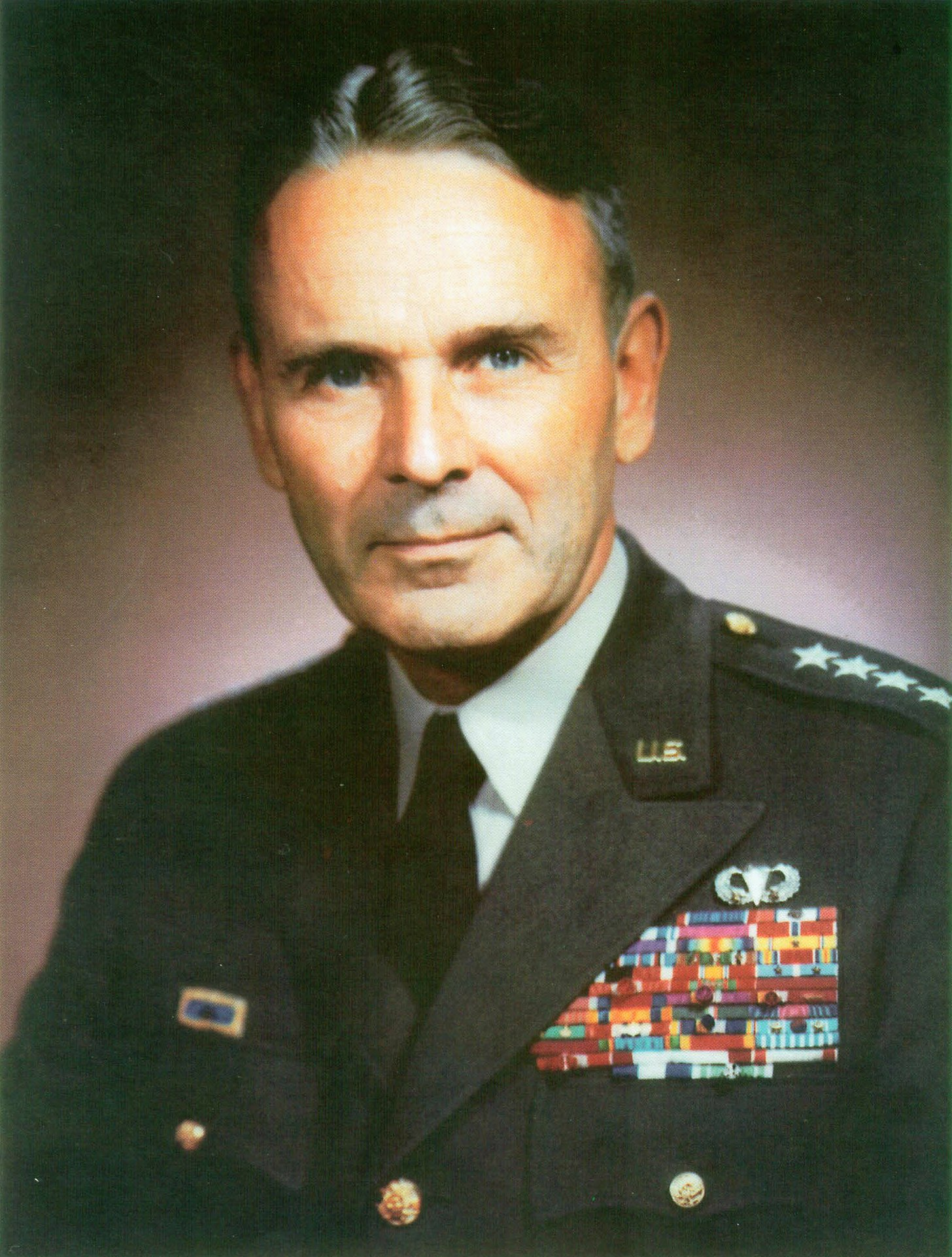
Maxwell Taylor (1945–49)

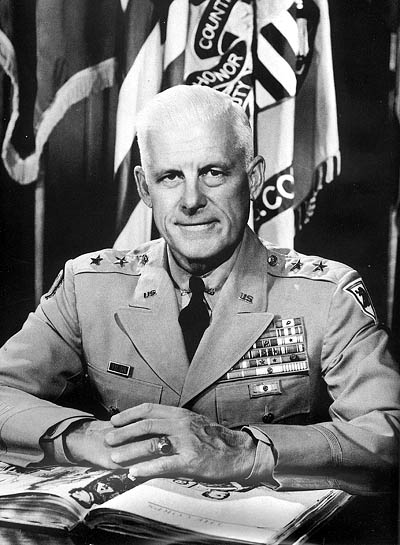
Garrison Davidson (1956–60)

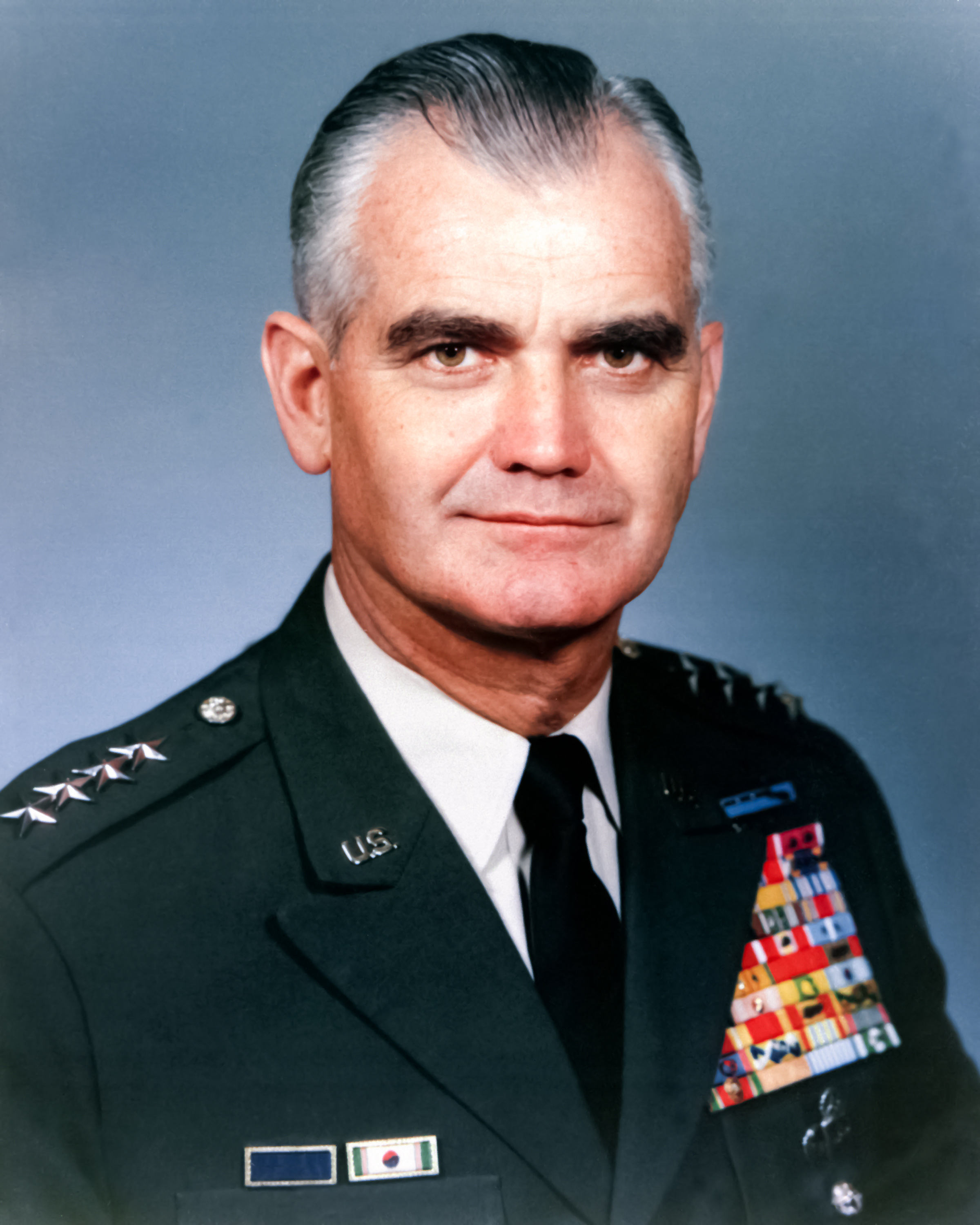
William Westmoreland (1960–63)

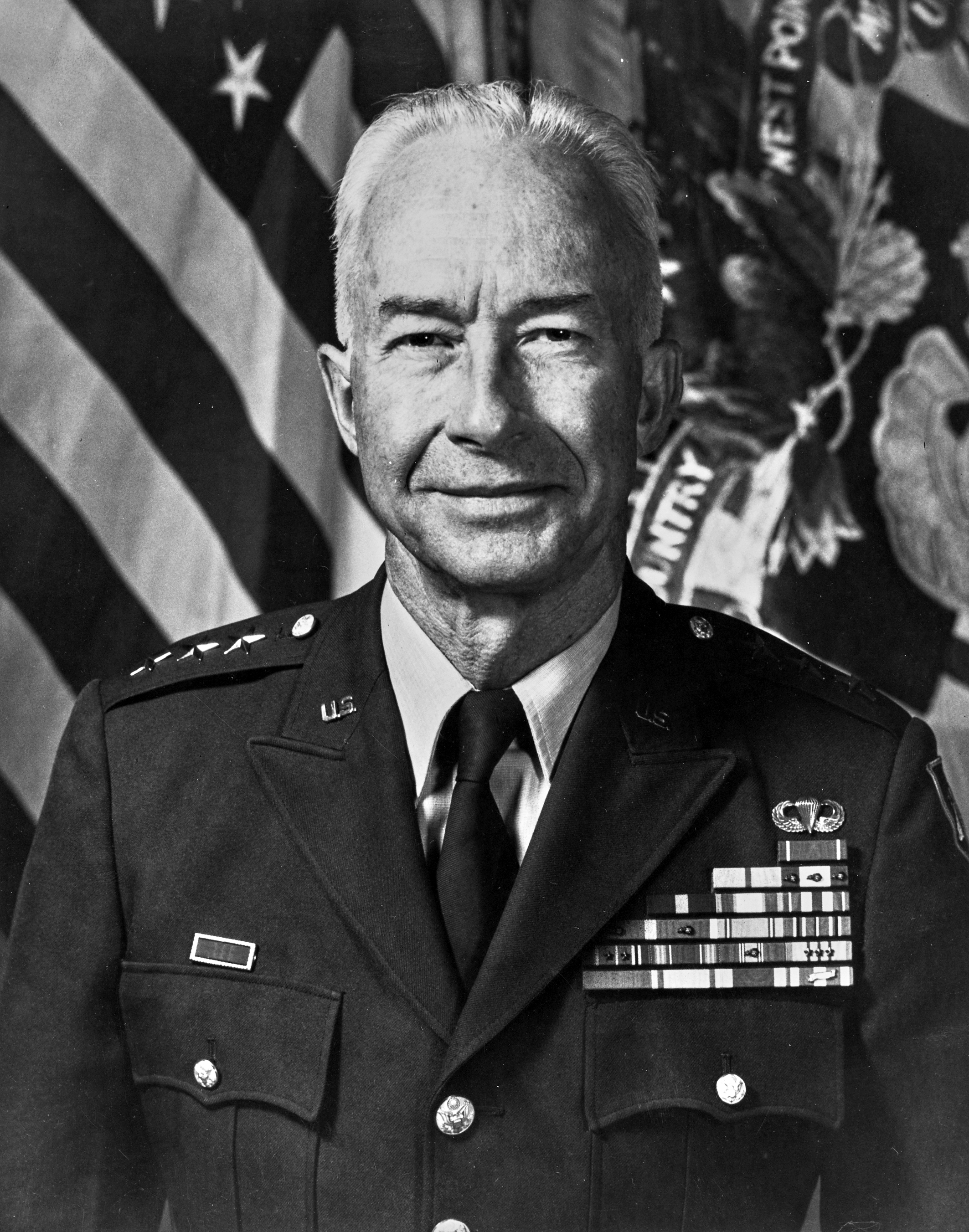
Andrew Goodpaster (1977–81)

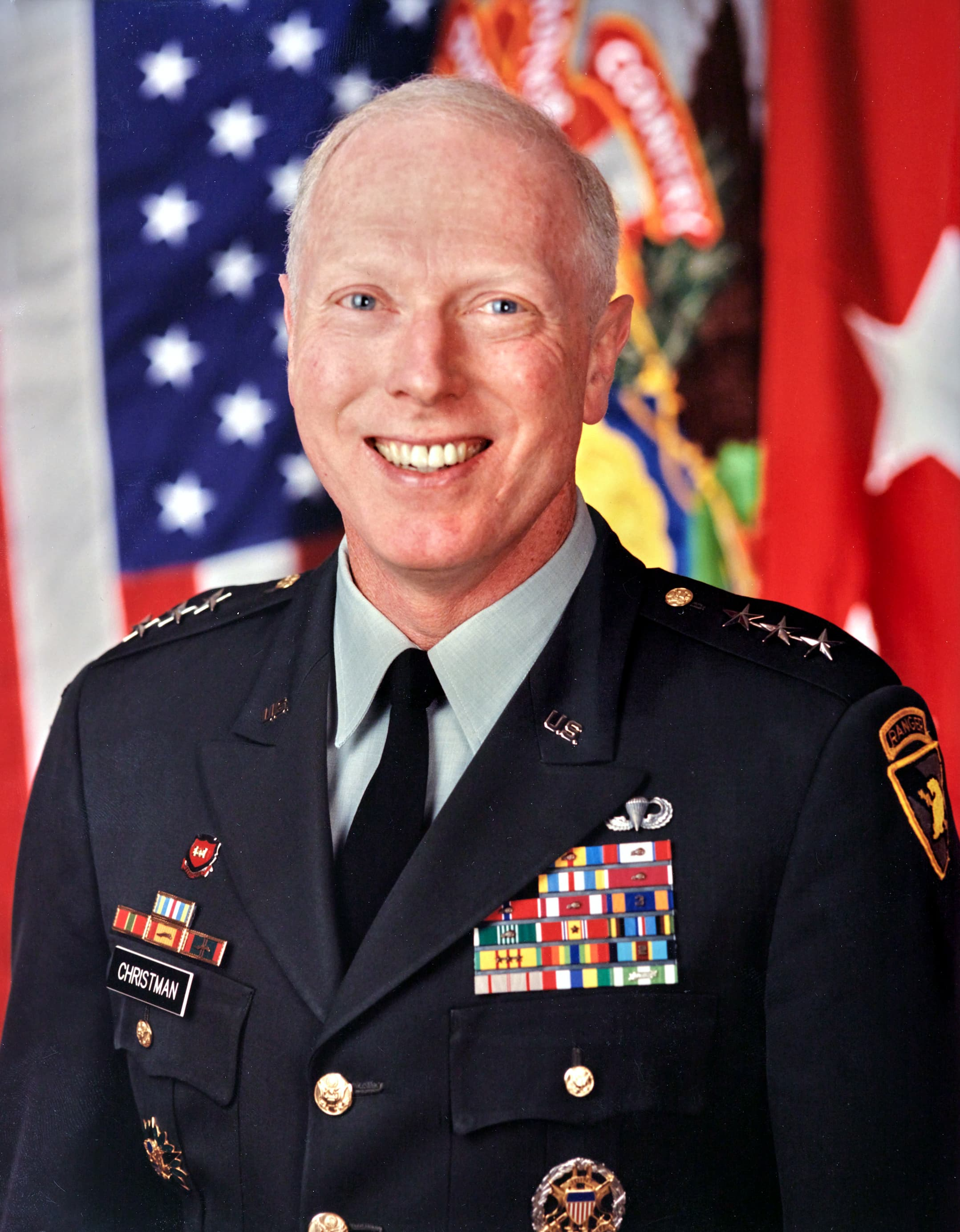
Daniel Christman (1996–2001)

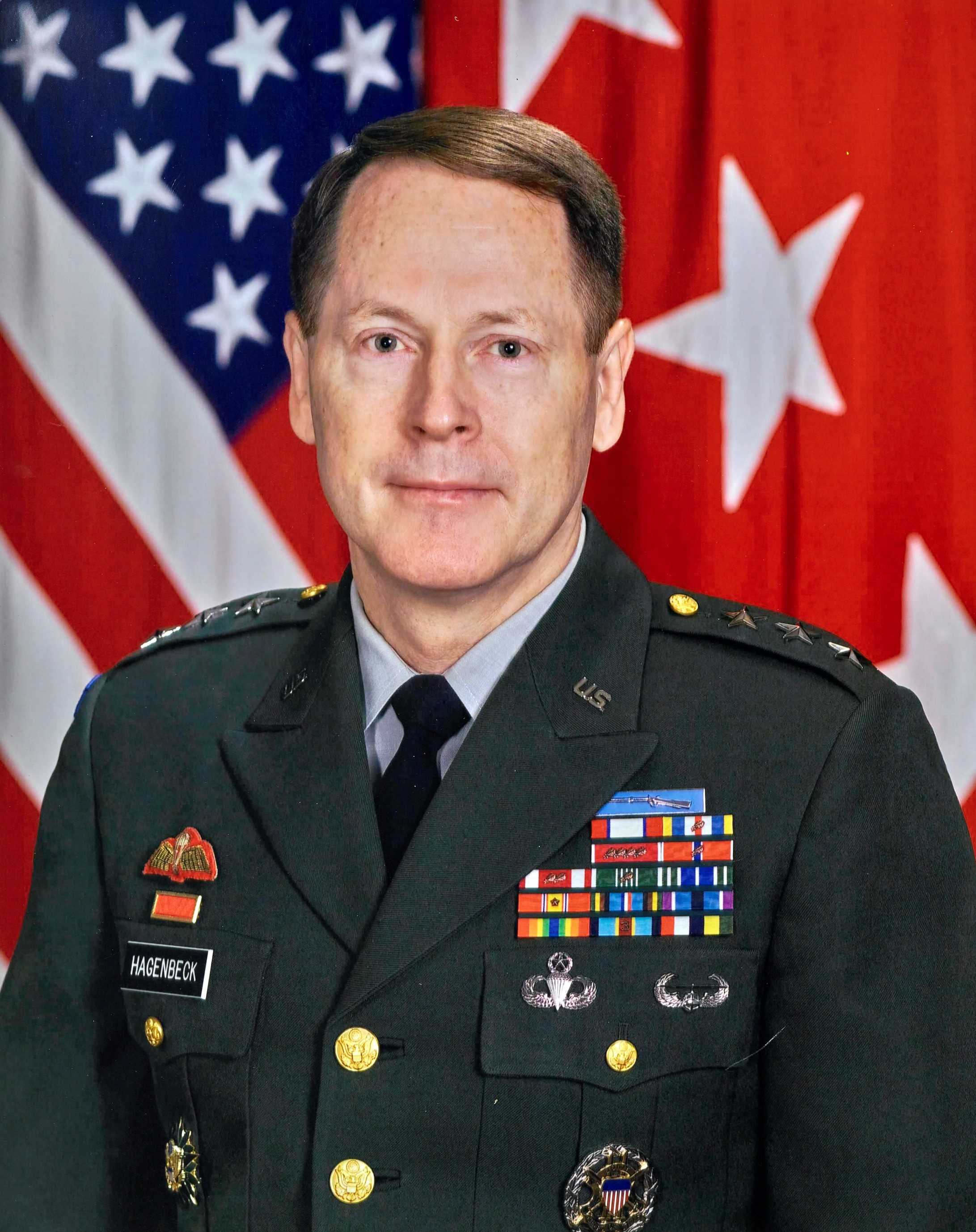
Franklin Hagenbeck (2006–10)

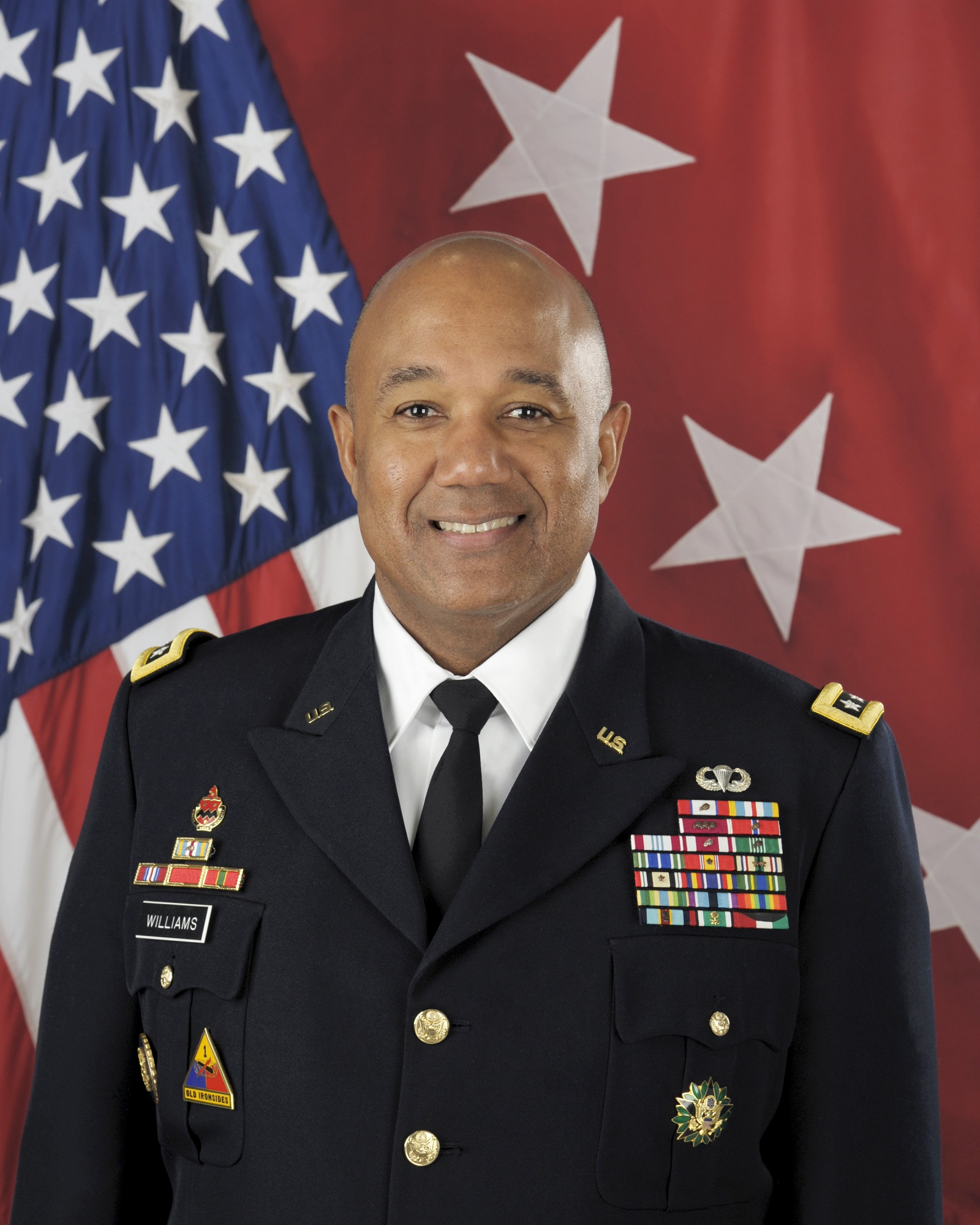
Darryl Williams (2018–2022)

== See also ==
- Superintendent of the United States Naval Academy
- Superintendent of the United States Air Force Academy
