= Zealous Bates Tower =

Union army general (1819–1900)

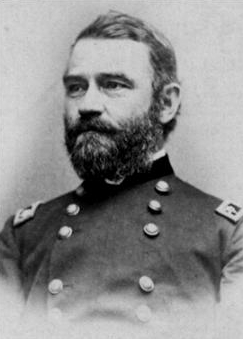
- Born: January 12, 1819; Cohasset, Massachusetts, U.S.
- Died: March 20, 1900 (aged 81); Cohasset, Massachusetts, U.S.
- Burial place: Central Cemetery, Cohasset, Massachusetts
- Military career
- Allegiance: United States of America; Union
- Branch: United States Army; Union Army
- Service years: 1841–1883
- Rank: Brigadier General; Brevet Major General
- Conflicts: Mexican–American War; Battle of Contreras; Battle of Chapultepec; American Civil War; Battle of Pensacola (1861); Second Battle of Bull Run; Battle of Nashville

Zealous Bates Tower (January 12, 1819 – March 20, 1900) was an American soldier and civil engineer who served as a general in the Union Army during the American Civil War. He was most noted for constructing the solid defenses of Federal-occupied Nashville, Tennessee, which proved to withstand repeated attacks by the Confederates.

== Birth and early years ==
Tower was born at Cohasset, Massachusetts, to a family settled at adjacent Hingham since its founding. He graduated with first honors at West Point in 1841. He served under General Scott in the Mexican War, led the storming column at Contreras, and was wounded at Chapultepec. After the war, Tower served as an engineer. He was responsible for the initial construction of the Federal facilities on Alcatraz Island in San Francisco Bay and Fort Point, San Francisco.

== Civil War ==
At the outbreak of the Civil War, he was chief engineer in the defense of Fort Pickens. On June 12, 1862, he was appointed brigadier general of volunteers, to rank from November 23, 1861. Tower served in I Corps when it was listed as III Corps in Major General John Pope's Army of Virginia. He led a brigade in the division of Brig. Gen. James B. Ricketts. On August 30, 1862, Tower was severely wounded at the Second Battle of Bull Run.

After recovering from his wound, Tower was superintendent of West Point from July until September 1864. He then became chief engineer of the defenses of Nashville, Tennessee, and his skillful work at that place contributed to the total defeat of John Bell Hood's Army of Tennessee at the Battle of Nashville in December 1864. On January 13, 1866, President Andrew Johnson nominated Tower for the award of the honorary grade of brevet major general, U.S. Volunteers, to rank from June 12, 1865, and the U.S. Senate confirmed the award on March 12, 1866.

== Post war ==
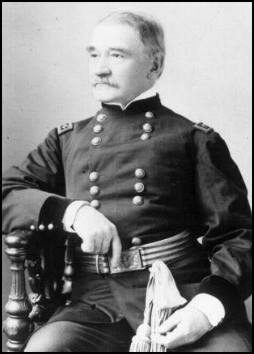
Tower in later life

Tower stayed in the Regular Army after the Civil War. In November 1865, he became a lieutenant colonel in the Engineer Corps. Tower supervised the work of improving several major harbors, both for commercial and military purposes. He was promoted to colonel in January 1874. Tower retired from the service in 1883. He then returned to Cohasset, Massachusetts, where he lived until his death on March 30, 1900. He was buried in Central Cemetery in Cohasset.

He was an original founding member of the Aztec Club of 1847, a social organization for officers who served in the Mexican-American War. He was president of the Aztec Club from 1885 to 1887. He was also a Companion of the Military Order of Foreign Wars.

== See also ==
- List of American Civil War generals (Union)
- List of Massachusetts generals in the American Civil War

== Notes ==
Military offices
Preceded by Alexander Hamilton Bowman	Superintendent of the United States Military Academy; 1864 - 1866	Succeeded by George Washington Cullum
