= Robert Ivany =

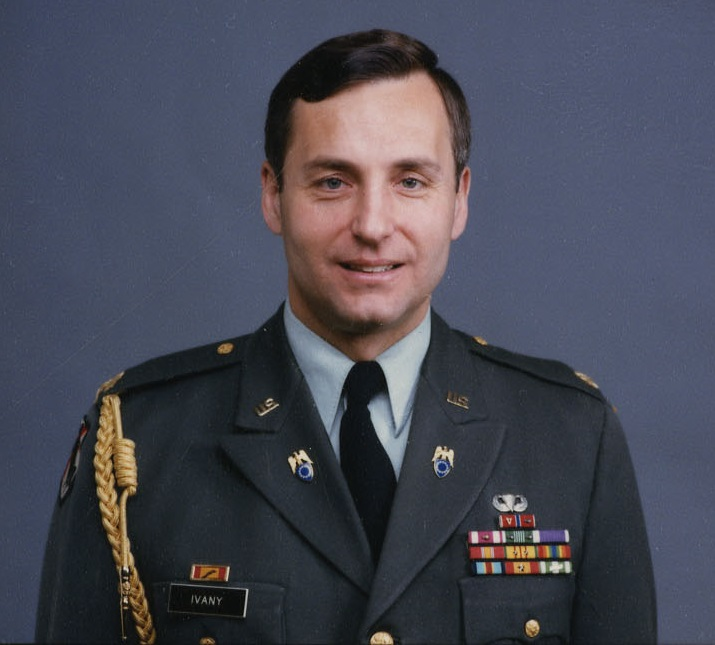
- Ivany as Army Aide to the President in 1986

8th President of the University of St. Thomas
- In office July 1, 2004 – June 30, 2017

Personal details
- Born: February 4, 1947 (age 79) Allied-occupied Austria
- Education: United States Military Academy (BS); University of Wisconsin–Madison (MA, PhD)
- Nickname: Bob

Military service
- Allegiance: United States
- Branch/service: United States Army
- Years of service: 1969–2003
- Rank: Major General
- Commands: United States Army War College; United States Army Military District of Washington; Office of Military Cooperation in Kuwait; 3rd Armored Cavalry Regiment; 1st Squadron, 3rd Armored Cavalry Regiment
- Battles/wars: Vietnam War; Gulf War
- Awards: Defense Distinguished Service Medal; Army Distinguished Service Medal (2); Defense Superior Service Medal; Legion of Merit (2); Bronze Star Medal (2); Purple Heart

Robert Rudolph Ivany (born February 4, 1947) is an Austrian-born American retired major general in the United States Army. He was the commanding general of the Army Military District of Washington from 1998 to 2000, and his final assignment was as commandant of the United States Army War College from 2000 to 2003. After his retirement from military service, he was the president of the University of St. Thomas from 2004 to 2017.

Born to Hungarian refugees in Austria, he graduated from the United States Military Academy in 1969 and commissioned as an Armor officer. Ivany was deployed for the Vietnam War shortly after, where he was awarded the Bronze Star with valor and a Purple Heart. He later served as army aide to the president of the United States in the 1980s, and as an advisor in Saudi Arabia and Kuwait after the Gulf War. His education includes a master's degree and a doctorate in history from the University of Wisconsin–Madison. Ivany is also a graduate of the United States Army Command and General Staff College and the Army War College.

== Early life and education ==
Born in Austria to Hungarian war refugees on February 4, 1947, Robert Rudolph Ivany attended college at the United States Military Academy at West Point, New York. In addition to earning a Bachelor of Science degree from the United States Military Academy in 1969, he received a Master of Arts and a Doctor of Philosophy in history from the University of Wisconsin–Madison, the latter in May 1980. His doctoral thesis was entitled The Exploited Emigres: The Hungarians in Europe, 1853-1861 and his thesis advisor was Theodore S. Hamerow.

Ivany's military education included the United States Army Command and General Staff College in 1983, and the United States Army War College in 1990.

== Army career ==
Ivany was commissioned in the United States Army as an Armor officer upon graduation in 1969. His first assignment was in the 3rd Squadron, 5th Cavalry Regiment, from 1970 to 1971, deployed for the Vietnam War. While in South Vietnam, he was awarded a Bronze Star Medal, a Bronze Star with valor, and the Purple Heart. Ivany served in the 194th Armored Brigade from 1971 to 1972, and then was aide-de-camp to the commanding general of the United States Army Materiel Command from 1972 to 1973. After attending the Armor School in 1974 and receiving his master's degree in 1976, he worked in the US Military Academy's history department from 1976 to 1979. Ivany received his doctorate in 1980, and then served as the S3 officer of the 2nd Squadron, 2nd Armored Cavalry Regiment, from 1980 to 1982 in West Germany.

After attending the Army Command and General Staff College in 1983, he served in the Office of the Deputy Chief of Staff for Operations from 1983 to 1984. Ivany was the Army Aide to the president of the United States from 1984 to 1986, and then served as commander of the 1st Squadron, 3rd Armored Cavalry Regiment, from 1986 to 1989. After attending the Army War College in 1990, he returned to his previous unit as the commander of the 3rd Armored Cavalry Regiment. During that time, Ivany was awarded the Legion of Merit. In 1993 he worked with the Saudi Arabian National Guard, and in 1994 he became the chief of the Office of Military Cooperation in Kuwait. Ivany assisted several nations in the transformation of their armed forces, including Saudi Arabia and Kuwait. After that, he served as the assistant deputy commander (maneuver) of the 4th Infantry Division from 1995 to 1996, and then deputy commanding general of the United States Third Army in 1996.

Ivany also served as an assistant professor of history and as a football coach at the Military Academy at West Point. As the Commanding General of the United States Army Military District of Washington from 1998 to 2000, he directed a diverse organization of 5500 civilian and military employees based on seven installations in three states and the District of Columbia.

Prior to his retirement from the Army with the rank of major general, Ivany had presided over one of the nation's most respected institutions for the education of strategic leaders: the United States Army War College in Carlisle, Pennsylvania. There for three years, he instituted programs to develop the next generation of military and civilian leaders from the United States and 42 foreign countries to meet the challenges of cultural change, organizational transformation and a drastically altered national security environment.

== Academia ==
After retiring from the army in October 2003, Ivany joined the faculty of the Graduate School of Business, Columbia University as an adjunct professor in Executive Education. He worked with senior executives in Great Britain, Canada, and the United States in leader development, strategic planning and cultural change.

On July 1, 2004, Ivany became the eighth president of the University of St. Thomas. He was formally installed into office in January 2005 at a reception which featured the presence of former United States President George H. W. Bush. He resides in Houston with his wife, Marianne, and his children.

Ivany significantly increased the St. Thomas endowment during his short tenure. He has initiated several academic programs in an effort to increase the institution's prestige. He became president emeritus in 2017.

=== Athletics ===
During Ivany's tenure as president of the University of St. Thomas, he has made it a priority to develop intercollegiate athletics as a means to increase school spirit among students, alumni and donors. In the summer of 2005, Ivany called for the formation of the Athletics Advisory Council to study intercollegiate athletics at UST and make recommendations. The Council concluded that intercollegiate athletics would help the university's image and would not result in a reduction in funds for other programs. The program was initiated as the St. Thomas Celts.

== Leadership Development Initiative ==
Ivany has spoken on the topic of leadership development to varied audiences, including:

- Cleveland City Club
- 2002 Peter F. Drucker Conference for Nonprofit Management
- Union League of Philadelphia
- First Friday Club of Cleveland
- Atlanta Rotary
- Northeast Regional United Way Conference
- Quanex Corporation
- CenterPoint Energy
- Walt Disney Resorts
- Houston Junior Achievement
- Houston Partnership Board.

Ivany has been interested in the leadership challenges facing military and civilian leaders for several years. His article "Soldiers and Legislators: A Common Mission" appeared in Parameters in 1990 and received the General Dwight D. Eisenhower Award for Excellence in Military Writing. He is conducting research on the leadership attributes of 20 generals and admirals who have transitioned to corporate leadership.

== Memberships and awards ==
Ivany belongs to the Leader to Leader Institute, the Army Football Club, Mental Health Association and the Knights of Columbus. He has received the Ellis Island Medal of Freedom, the Humanitarian Medal from the Chapel of the Four Chaplains Association, the Director's Award from the US Secret Service, the Admiral Thomas J. Hamilton Award for Leadership, and together with his spouse, the Aaron and Hur Award from the U.S. Army Chaplaincy. He was named a distinguished graduate of St. Ignatius H.S., Cleveland, Ohio and has earned numerous military awards.

== Family ==
Ivany is married to the former Marianne O'Donnell; they have four children, daughter Julianne Sara and sons Brian Michael, Mark and Chris.
