= Alexander Haig =

American politician and diplomat (1924–2010)

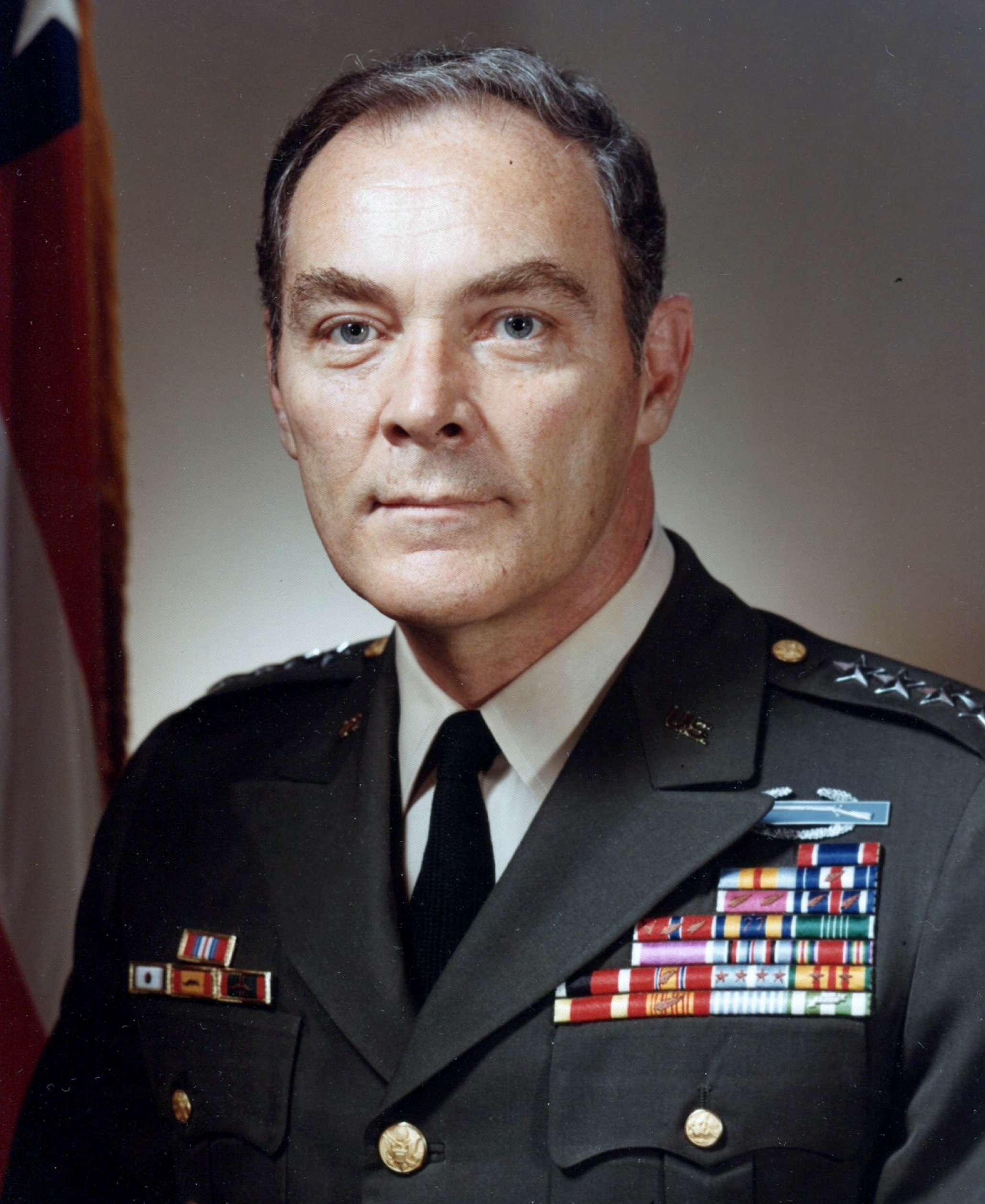
- Official portrait, c. 1970s

59th United States Secretary of State
- In office 22 January 1981 – 5 July 1982
- President: Ronald Reagan
- Deputy: William P. Clark Jr. Walter J. Stoessel Jr.
- Preceded by: Edmund Muskie
- Succeeded by: George Shultz

7th Supreme Allied Commander Europe
- In office 15 December 1974 – 1 July 1979
- President: Gerald Ford; Jimmy Carter
- Deputy: John Mogg; Harry Tuzo; Gerd Schmückle
- Preceded by: Andrew Goodpaster
- Succeeded by: Bernard W. Rogers

5th White House Chief of Staff
- In office 4 May 1973 – 21 September 1974
- President: Richard Nixon; Gerald Ford
- Preceded by: H. R. Haldeman
- Succeeded by: Donald Rumsfeld

Vice Chief of Staff of the United States Army
- In office 4 January 1973 – 4 May 1973
- President: Richard Nixon
- Preceded by: Bruce Palmer Jr.
- Succeeded by: Frederick C. Weyand

6th United States Deputy National Security Advisor
- In office June 1970 – 4 January 1973
- President: Richard Nixon
- Preceded by: Richard V. Allen
- Succeeded by: Brent Scowcroft

Personal details
- Born: Alexander Meigs Haig Jr. 2 December 1924 Bala Cynwyd, Pennsylvania, U.S.
- Died: 20 February 2010 (aged 85) Baltimore, Maryland, U.S.
- Resting place: Arlington National Cemetery
- Party: Republican
- Spouse: Patricia Fox (m. 1950)
- Children: 3, including Brian
- Relatives: Frank Haig (brother)
- Education: University of Notre Dame; United States Military Academy (BS); Columbia University (MBA); Georgetown University (MA)

Military service
- Allegiance: United States
- Branch/service: United States Army
- Years of service: 1947–1979
- Rank: General
- Battles/wars: Korean War; Battle of Chosin Reservoir; Vietnam War
- Awards: Distinguished Service Cross; Defense Distinguished Service Medal (2); Army Distinguished Service Medal; Navy Distinguished Service Medal; Air Force Distinguished Service Medal; Silver Star (2); Legion of Merit (3); Distinguished Flying Cross (3); Bronze Star (3) with "V" device; Purple Heart; Air Medal (27)

Alexander Meigs Haig Jr. (/heɪɡ/; 2 December 1924 – 20 February 2010) was an American politician, diplomat, and military officer who served as the 59th United States secretary of state under President Ronald Reagan and previously as the 5th White House chief of staff under Presidents Richard Nixon and Gerald Ford, as well as United States Deputy National Security Advisor under President Nixon. A member of the Republican Party, he was a general in the U.S. Army prior to and in between these cabinet-level positions, serving first as the vice chief of staff of the Army and then as Supreme Allied Commander Europe. In 1973, Haig became the youngest four-star general in the U.S. Army's history.

Haig was born and raised in Pennsylvania. He graduated from the U.S. Military Academy and served in the Korean War, during which he served as an aide to Lt. General Alonzo Patrick Fox and Lt. General Edward Almond. Afterward, he served as an aide to defense secretary Robert McNamara. During the Vietnam War, Haig commanded a battalion and later a brigade of the 1st Infantry Division. For his service, Haig received the Distinguished Service Cross, the Silver Star with oak leaf cluster, and the Purple Heart.

In 1969, Haig became an assistant to national security advisor Henry Kissinger and served as United States Deputy National Security Advisor from 1970 to 1973. He became vice chief of staff of the Army, the Army's second-highest-ranking position, in 1972. After the 1973 resignation of H. R. Haldeman, Haig became President Nixon's chief of staff. Serving in the wake of the Watergate scandal, he became especially influential in the final months of Nixon's tenure, playing a role in persuading Nixon to resign in 1974. Haig continued to serve as chief of staff for the first month of President Ford's tenure. From 1974 to 1979, Haig served as Supreme Allied Commander Europe, commanding all NATO forces in Europe. He retired from the army in 1979 and pursued a career in business.

After Reagan won the 1980 U.S. presidential election, he nominated Haig to be his secretary of state. After the Reagan assassination attempt, Haig said "I am in control here, in the White House", despite not being next in the line of succession. During the Falklands War, Haig sought to broker peace between the United Kingdom and Argentina. He resigned from Reagan's cabinet in July 1982 and unsuccessfully sought the presidential nomination in the 1988 Republican primaries. Haig also served as the head of a consulting firm and hosted the television program World Business Review. He died at the age of 85 in February 2010.

== Early life and education ==
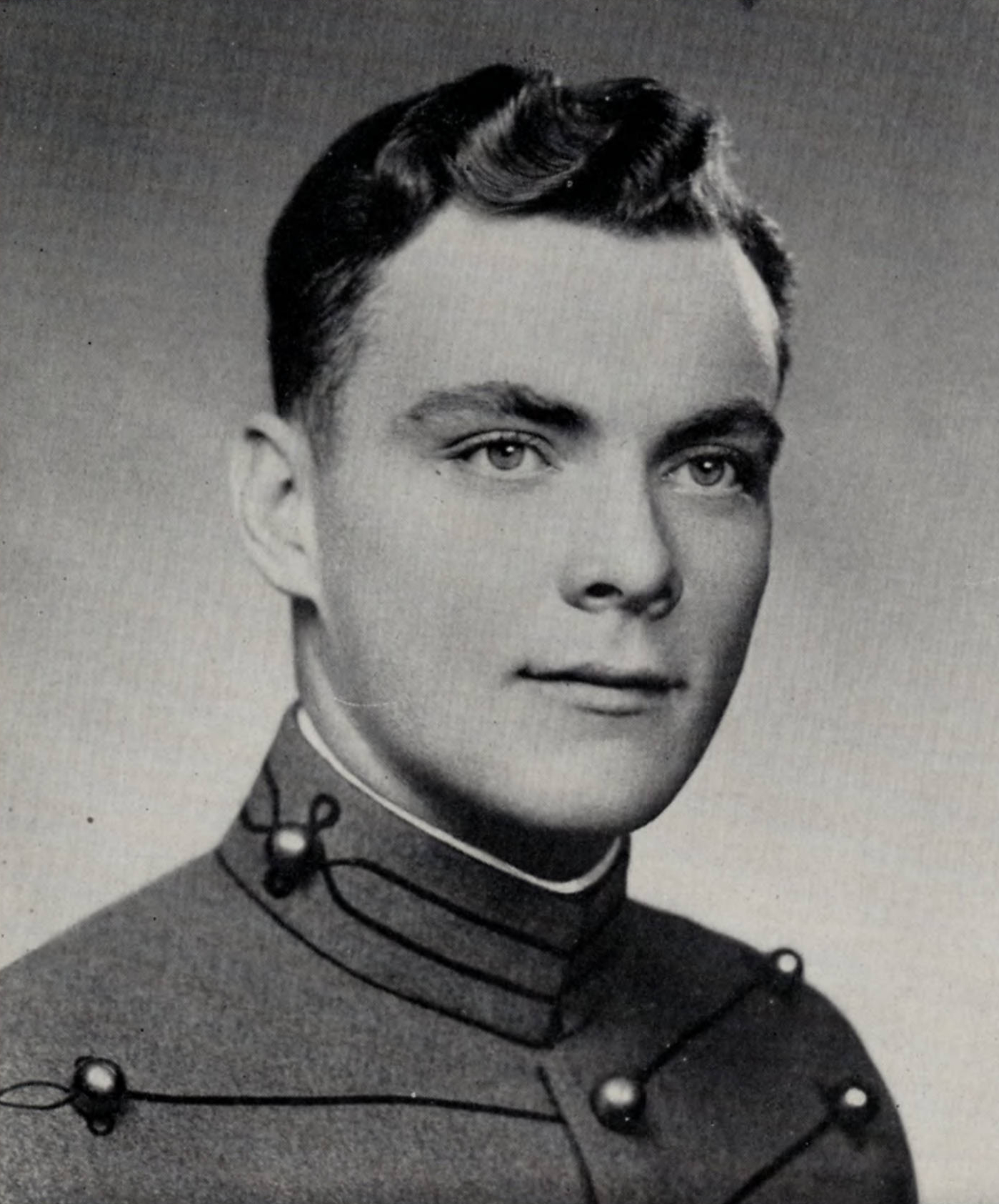
Haig in the United States Military Academy yearbook, 1947

Haig was born in Bala Cynwyd, Pennsylvania, the middle of three children of Alexander Meigs Haig, a Republican lawyer of Scottish descent, and his wife, Regina Anne (née Murphy). When Haig was 9, his father, aged 41, died of cancer. His Irish American mother raised her children in the Catholic faith. Haig initially attended Saint Joseph's Preparatory School in Philadelphia, Pennsylvania, on a scholarship; when he was withdrawn due to poor academic performance, he transferred to Lower Merion High School in Ardmore, Pennsylvania, where he graduated in 1942.

Initially unable to secure his desired appointment to the United States Military Academy, though one of his teachers opined that "Al is definitely not West Point material", Haig studied at the University of Notre Dame, where he earned a "string of A's" in an "intellectual awakening" for two years before securing a congressional appointment to the U.S. Military Academy in 1944 at the behest of his uncle, who served as the Philadelphia municipal government's director of public works.

Haig was enrolled in an accelerated wartime curriculum at West Point that deemphasized the humanities and social sciences, and he graduated in the bottom third of his class (ranked 214 of 310) in 1947. Although a West Point superintendent characterized Haig as "the last man in his class anyone expected to become the first general", other classmates acknowledged his "strong convictions and even stronger ambitions". Haig later earned an MBA from the Columbia Business School in New York City in 1955. As a major, he attended the Naval War College in 1960 and then earned a M.A. in international relations from Georgetown University in Washington, D.C. in 1961. His thesis at Georgetown University examined the role of military officers in making national policy.

== Early military career ==
=== Korean War ===
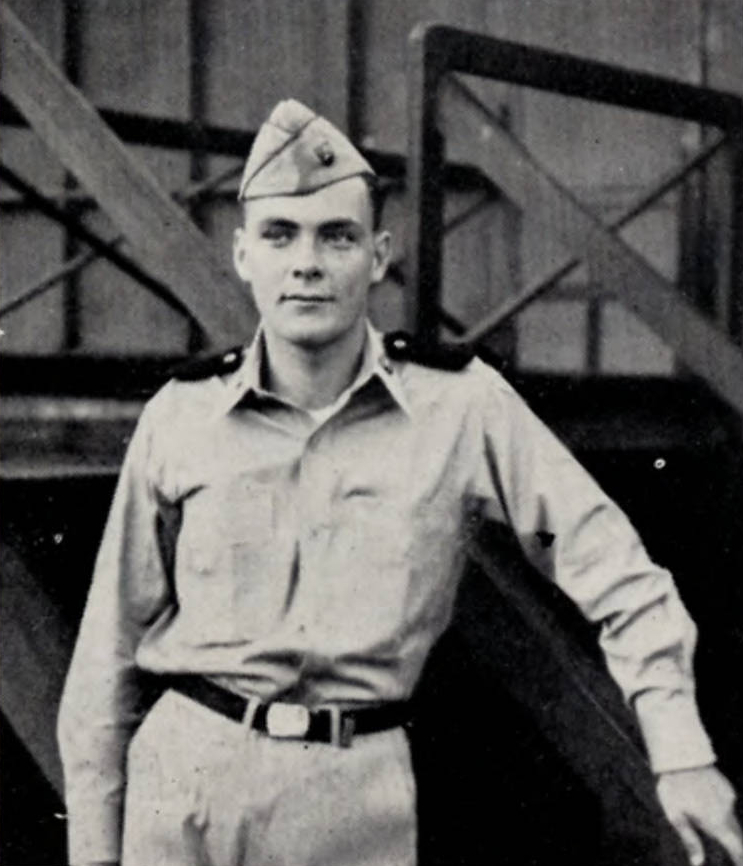
Haig in uniform c. 1947

As a young officer, Haig served as an aide to Lieutenant General Alonzo Patrick Fox, a deputy chief of staff to General Douglas MacArthur. In 1950, Haig married Fox's daughter, Patricia.

In the early days of the Korean War, Haig was responsible for maintaining General MacArthur's situation map and briefing MacArthur each evening on the day's battlefield events. Haig later served (1950–51) with the X Corps, as aide to MacArthur's chief of staff, General Edward Almond, who awarded Haig two Silver Stars and a Bronze Star with Valor device. Haig participated in four Korean War campaigns, including the Battle of Inchon, the Battle of Chosin Reservoir and the evacuation of Hŭngnam, as Almond's aide.

=== Pentagon assignments ===
Haig served as a staff officer in the Office of the Deputy Chief of Staff for Operations at the Pentagon (1962–64), and was appointed military assistant to Secretary of the Army Stephen Ailes in 1964. He then was appointed military assistant to Secretary of Defense Robert McNamara, continuing in that service until the end of 1965. In 1966, Haig graduated from the United States Army War College.

=== Vietnam War ===
In 1966, Haig took command of a battalion of the 1st Infantry Division during the Vietnam War. On 22 May 1967, General William Westmoreland rewarded Haig with the Distinguished Service Cross, the U.S. Army's second-highest medal for valor, in recognition of his actions during the Battle of Ap Gu in March 1967. During the battle, Haig, then a member of the 1st Battalion, 26th Infantry Regiment, became pinned down by a Viet Cong force that outnumbered U.S. forces by three to one. In an attempt to survey the battlefield, Haig boarded a helicopter and flew to the point of contact. His helicopter was subsequently shot down, leading to two days of bloody hand-to-hand combat. An excerpt from Haig's Distinguished Service Cross citation states:

When two of his companies were engaged by a large hostile force, Colonel Haig landed amid a hail of fire, personally took charge of the units, called for artillery and air fire support and succeeded in soundly defeating the insurgent force ... the next day a barrage of 400 rounds was fired by the Viet Cong, but it was ineffective because of the warning and preparations by Colonel Haig. As the barrage subsided, a force three times larger than his began a series of human wave assaults on the camp. Heedless of the danger himself, Colonel Haig repeatedly braved intense hostile fire to survey the battlefield. His personal courage and determination, and his skillful employment of every defense and support tactic possible, inspired his men to fight with previously unimagined power. Although his force was outnumbered three to one, Colonel Haig succeeded in inflicting 592 casualties on the Viet Cong ... HQ US Army, Vietnam, General Orders No. 2318 (22 May 1967)

Haig was also awarded the Distinguished Flying Cross and the Purple Heart during his tour in Vietnam and was eventually promoted to colonel as commander of 2nd Brigade, 1st Infantry Division in Vietnam.

=== Return to West Point ===
Following his one-year tour of Vietnam during the Vietnam War, Haig returned to the United States to become regimental commander of the Third Regiment of the Corps of Cadets at West Point under the newly appointed commandant, Brigadier General Bernard W. Rogers. Both had previously served together in the 1st Infantry Division, Rogers as assistant division commander and Haig as brigade commander.

== Security adviser and vice chief of staff (1969–1973) ==
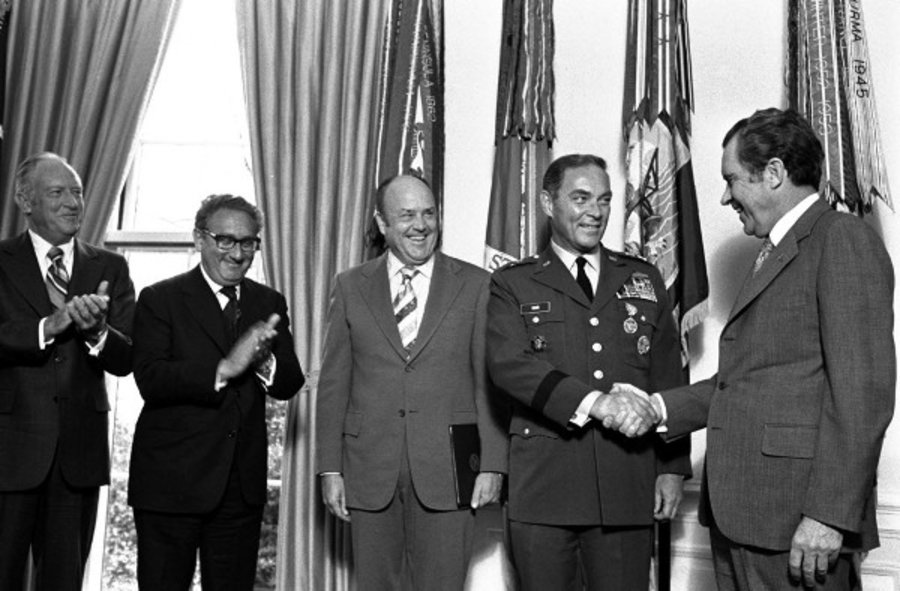
Major General Haig being presented with the Distinguished Service Medal by President Richard Nixon in the Oval Office in 1973

In 1969, he was appointed military assistant to the assistant to the president for national security affairs, Henry Kissinger. A year later, he replaced Richard V. Allen as deputy assistant to the president for national security affairs. During this period, he was promoted to brigadier general (September 1969) and major general (March 1972).

In the spring of 1972, the North Vietnamese armed forces (PAVN) launched a multi-prong attack, known as the Easter Offensive, on every region of South Vietnam. For the first time, the PAVN deployed heavy weaponry such as mobile surface-to-air missile batteries, tanks, and armored vehicles. In the early weeks of the offensive, the PAVN won startling advances, and captured crucial bases, roads, and cities. Nixon and Kissinger—while delicately picking their way through the diplomatic thickets of détente with Moscow and open relations with Peking (Beijing)—decided to respond to North Vietnam’s sweeping assault by mining its principal harbor, and massively bombing targets in every quarter of North Vietnam. Nixon and Kissinger opted to bypass the Departments of State and Defense, as well as the Joint Chiefs of Staff (JCS), in any advisory or decision-making capacity relating to what would become known as Operation Linebacker.

Haig effectively substituted for the JCS during this time. He developed the core strategy coordinating the mining with the bombing of transportation targets. He was dispatched to the Pentagon as well as Saigon to critique field commanders and military procedure, and provide an independent information channel to the White House. He was a member of a national security triumvirate, along with Nixon and Kissinger, that both scapegoated and ignored the military command running the daily operations in Vietnam.

In this position, Haig helped South Vietnamese president Nguyen Van Thieu negotiate the final cease-fire talks in 1972. Haig continued in the role until 4 January 1973, when he became vice chief of staff of the Army. Nixon planned to appoint Haig as chief of staff over Creighton Abrams, whom he personally disliked, but secretary of defense Melvin Laird resisted as Haig lacked the relevant upper-level command experience. He was confirmed by the U.S. Senate in October 1972, thus skipping the rank of lieutenant general. By appointing him to this billet, Nixon "passed over 240 generals" who were senior to Haig.

== White House chief of staff (1973–1974) ==
=== Nixon administration ===
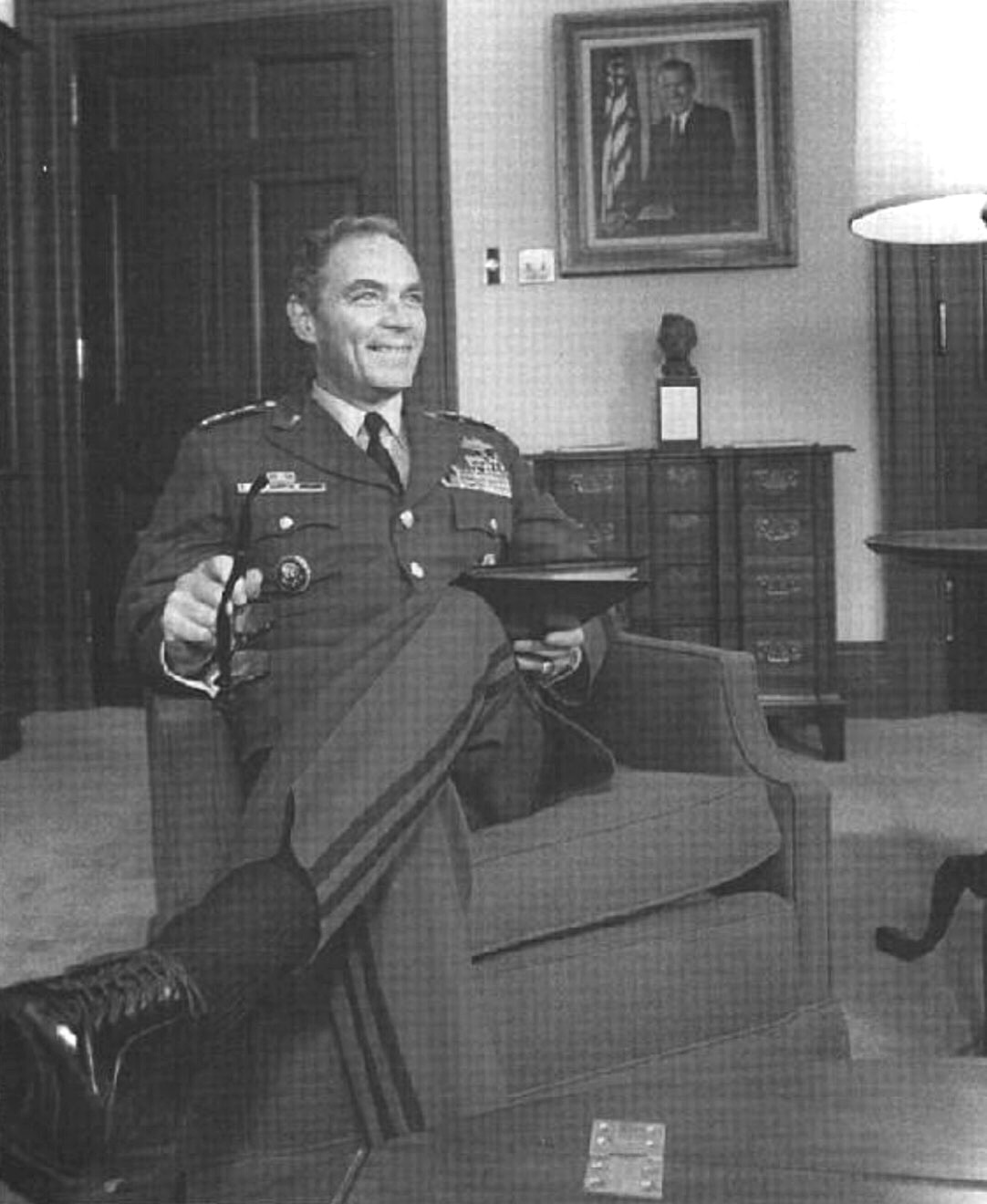
General Alexander Haig at his White House offices while still wearing his U.S. Army uniform, upon assuming the White House chief of staff position on May 4, 1973

In May 1973, after only four months as VCSA, Haig returned to the Nixon administration at the height of the Watergate affair as White House Chief of Staff. During the Saturday Night Massacre, Haig attempted to make acting-Attorney General William Ruckelshaus fire special prosecutor Archibald Cox. Haig's coercion failed, and Ruckelshaus resigned. Retaining his Army commission, he remained in the position until 21 September 1974, ultimately overseeing the transition to the presidency of Gerald Ford following Nixon's resignation on 9 August 1974.

Haig has been largely credited with keeping the government running while President Nixon was preoccupied with Watergate and was essentially seen as the "acting president" during Nixon's last few months in office. During July and early August 1974, Haig played an instrumental role in persuading Nixon to resign. Haig presented several pardon options to Ford a few days before Nixon resigned. In this regard, in his 1999 book Shadow, author Bob Woodward describes Haig's role as the point man between Nixon and Ford during the final days of Nixon's presidency. According to Woodward, Haig played a major behind-the-scenes role in the delicate negotiations of the transfer of power from Nixon to Ford.

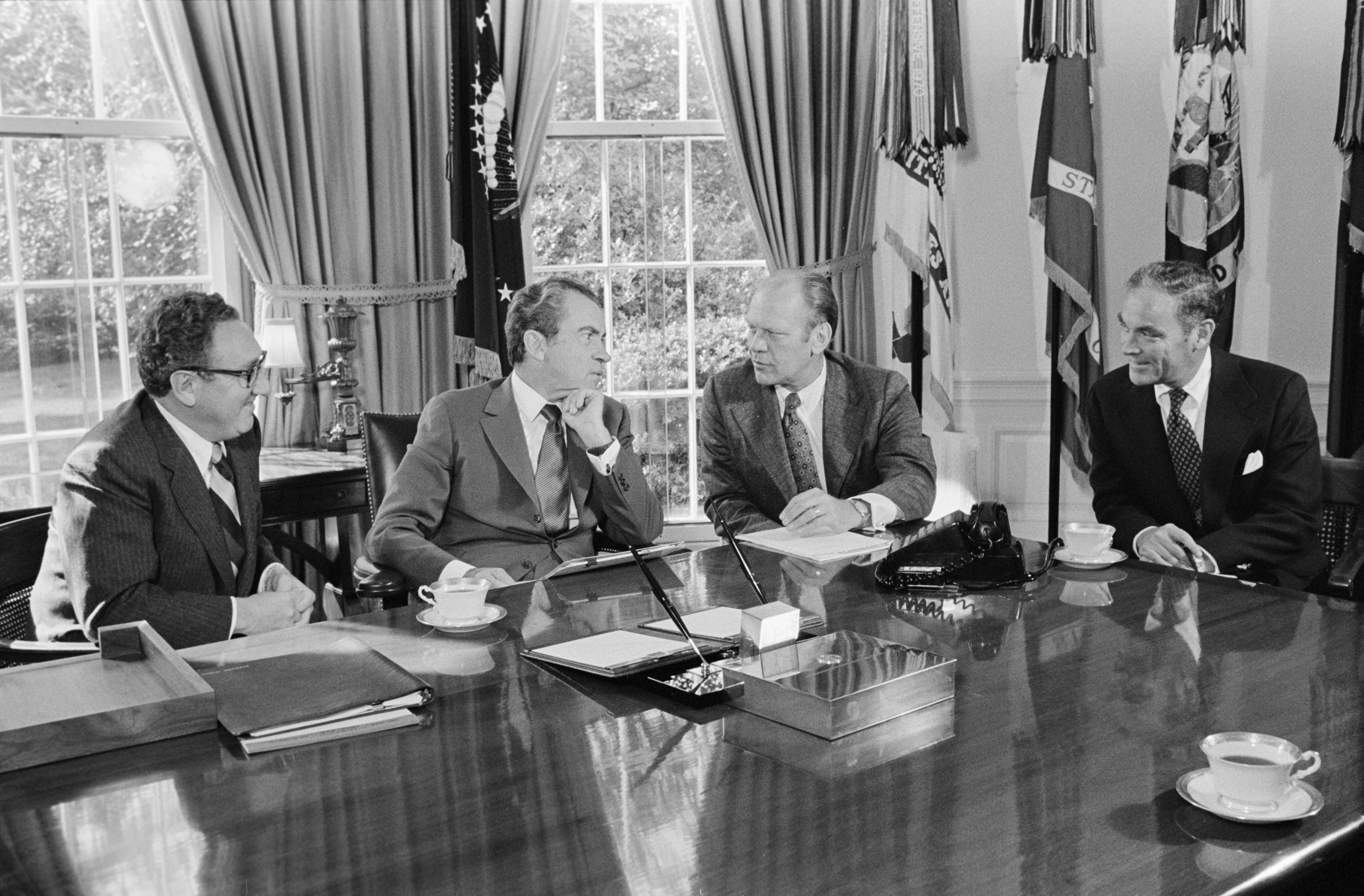
Henry Kissinger, Richard Nixon, Gerald Ford, and Haig meeting on Ford's forthcoming appointment as vice president in 1973

About one month after taking office, Ford pardoned Nixon, resulting in much controversy. However, Haig denied the allegation that he played a key role in arbitrating Nixon's resignation by offering Ford's pardon to Nixon. A day before Haig's departure to Europe to begin his tenure as NATO Supreme Allied Commander, Haig was telephoned by J. Fred Buzhardt. In the call, Buzhardt discussed with Haig President Ford's upcoming speech to the nation about pardoning Nixon, informing Haig that the speech contained something indicating Haig's role in Nixon's resignation and Ford's pardon of Nixon. According to Haig's autobiography (Inner Circles: How America Changed the World), Haig was furious and immediately drove straight to the White House to determine the veracity of Buzhardt's claims. This was due to his concern that Ford's speech would expose Haig's role in negotiating Nixon's resignation supposedly in exchange for a pardon issued by the new president.

On 7 August 1974, two days before Nixon's resignation, Haig met with Nixon in the Oval Office to discuss the transition. Following their conversation, Nixon told Haig, "You fellows, in your business, have a way of handling problems like this. Give them a pistol and leave the room. I don't have a pistol, Al."

=== Ford administration ===
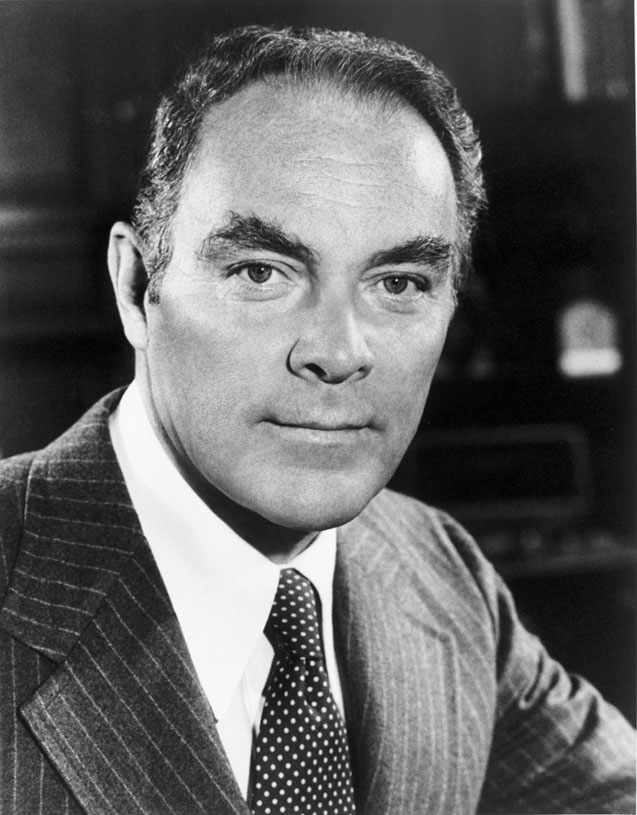
Haig's official chief of staff portrait

Following Nixon's resignation, Haig remained briefly as White House Chief of Staff under Ford. Haig aided in the transition by advising the new president mostly on policy matters on which he had been working under the Nixon presidency and introducing Ford to the White House staff and their daily activities. Haig recommended that Ford retain several of Nixon's White House staff for 30 days to provide an orderly transition. Haig and Kissinger also advised Ford on Nixon's détente policy with the Soviet Union following the SALT I treaty in 1972.

Haig found it difficult to get along with the new administration and wanted to return to the Army for his last command. It had also been rumored that Ford wanted to be his own chief of staff. At first Ford decided to replace Haig with Robert T. Hartmann, Ford's chief of staff during his tenure as vice president. Ford soon replaced Hartmann with United States Permanent Ambassador to NATO Donald Rumsfeld. Author and Haig biographer Roger Morris, a former colleague of Haig's on the National Security Council early in Nixon's first term, wrote that when Ford pardoned Nixon, he in effect pardoned Haig as well.

Haig resigned from his position as White House Chief of Staff and returned to active duty in the United States Army in September 1974.

== NATO Supreme Allied Commander (1974–1979) ==
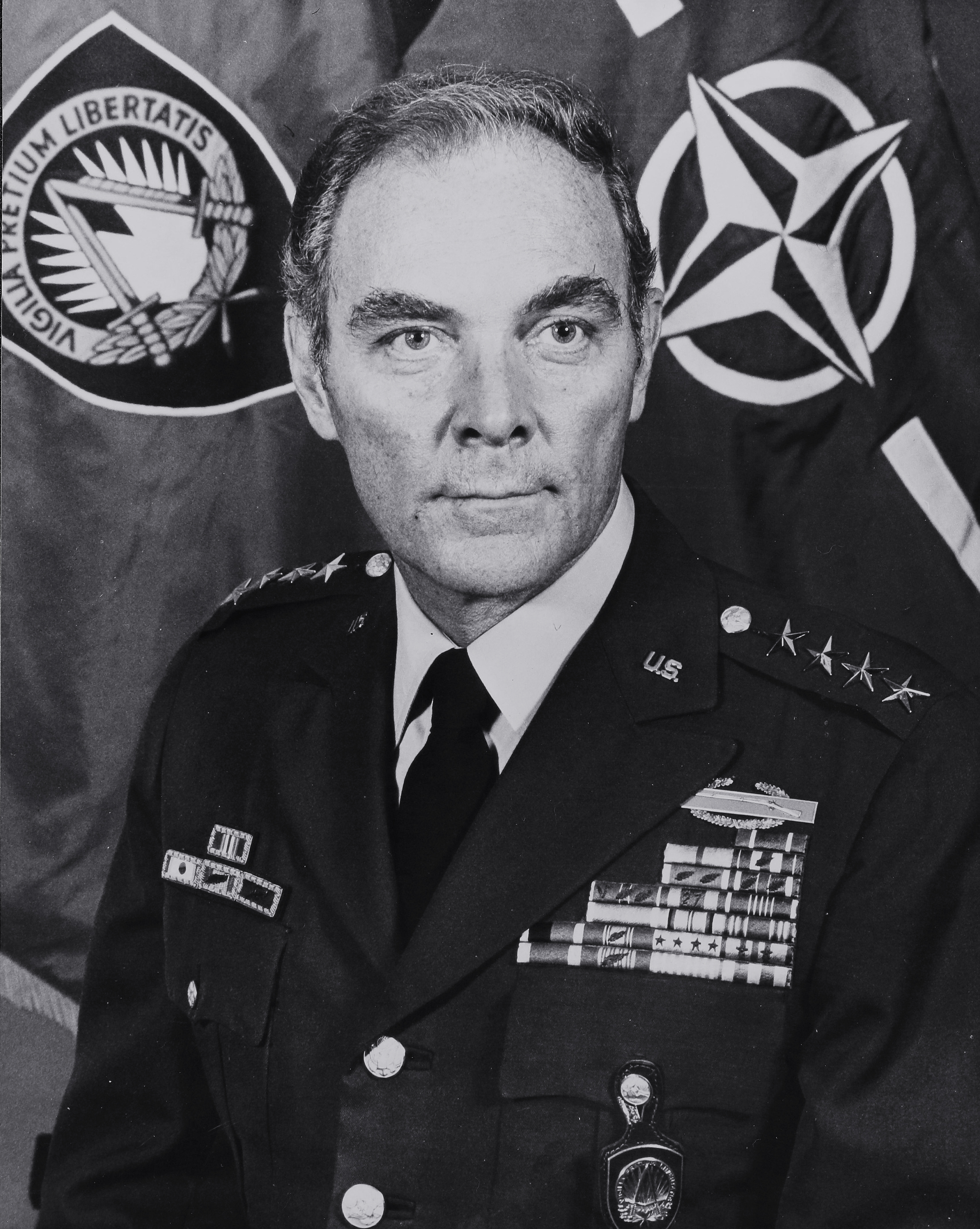
General Haig during his tenure as Supreme Allied Commander Europe

In December 1974, Haig was appointed as the next Supreme Allied Commander Europe by President Ford, replacing General Andrew Goodpaster and returning to active duty in the United States Army. Haig also became the front-runner to be the 27th U.S. Army Chief of Staff, following the death of General Creighton Abrams from complications of surgery to remove lung cancer on 4 September 1974. However it was General Frederick C. Weyand who ultimately filled Abrams's position as Chief of Staff. From 1974 to 1979 Haig served as the Supreme Allied Commander Europe, the commander of NATO forces in Europe, as well as commander-in-chief of United States European Command. During his tenure as SACEUR, Haig focused on transforming SACEUR in order to face the future global challenge following the end of the Vietnam War and the rise of Soviet influence within Eastern Europe.

Haig focused on strengthening the relationship between the United States and NATO member nations and their allies. As a result, several fleets of United States Air Force aircraft, such as the F-111 Aardvark from the Strategic Air Command, were relocated to US Air Force bases located in Europe. Haig also stressed the importance of increasing the training of US troops deployed in Europe following his tour of the Sixth Fleet in the Mediterranean Sea, on which Haig saw poorly-disciplined and ill-trained troops. As a result, Haig conducted routine inspections during NATO troops' training and often went to the training site and participated in the training itself. Haig also recommended the revitalization of equipment in the US installations in Europe and US troops deployed in Europe, in order to strengthen deterrence from possible attack.

Haig took the same route to SHAPE every day—a pattern of behavior that did not go unnoticed by terrorist organizations. On 25 June 1979, Haig was the target of an assassination attempt in Mons, Belgium. A land mine blew up under the bridge on which Haig's car was traveling, narrowly missing his car and wounding three of his bodyguards in a following car. Authorities later attributed responsibility for the attack to the Red Army Faction (RAF). In 1993 a German court sentenced Rolf Clemens Wagner, a former RAF member, to life imprisonment for the assassination attempt. During Haig's last month as Supreme Allied Commander Europe, he oversaw the talks and negotiation between the United States and NATO member nations of a new policy following the signing of SALT II treaty on 18 June 1979, by President Jimmy Carter and Soviet President Leonid Brezhnev. However Haig also drew concern regarding the treaty, which he believed benefited the Soviet position by giving them a way to build up their military arsenal.

Haig retired from his position as Supreme Allied Commander Europe in July 1979 and was succeeded by General Bernard W. Rogers, who previously served as Army Chief of Staff. Haig's retirement ceremony took place at NATO Supreme Headquarters Allied Powers Europe on 1 July 1979, and was attended by Secretary of Defense Harold Brown, NATO Secretary General Joseph Luns and U.S. Ambassador to NATO William Tapley Bennett Jr.

== Civilian positions ==
In 1979, Haig joined the Philadelphia-based Foreign Policy Research Institute as director of its Western Security Program, and he later served on the organization's board of trustees. Later that year, he was named president and director of United Technologies Corporation under chief executive officer Harry J. Gray, where he remained until 1981.

== Secretary of state (1981–1982) ==
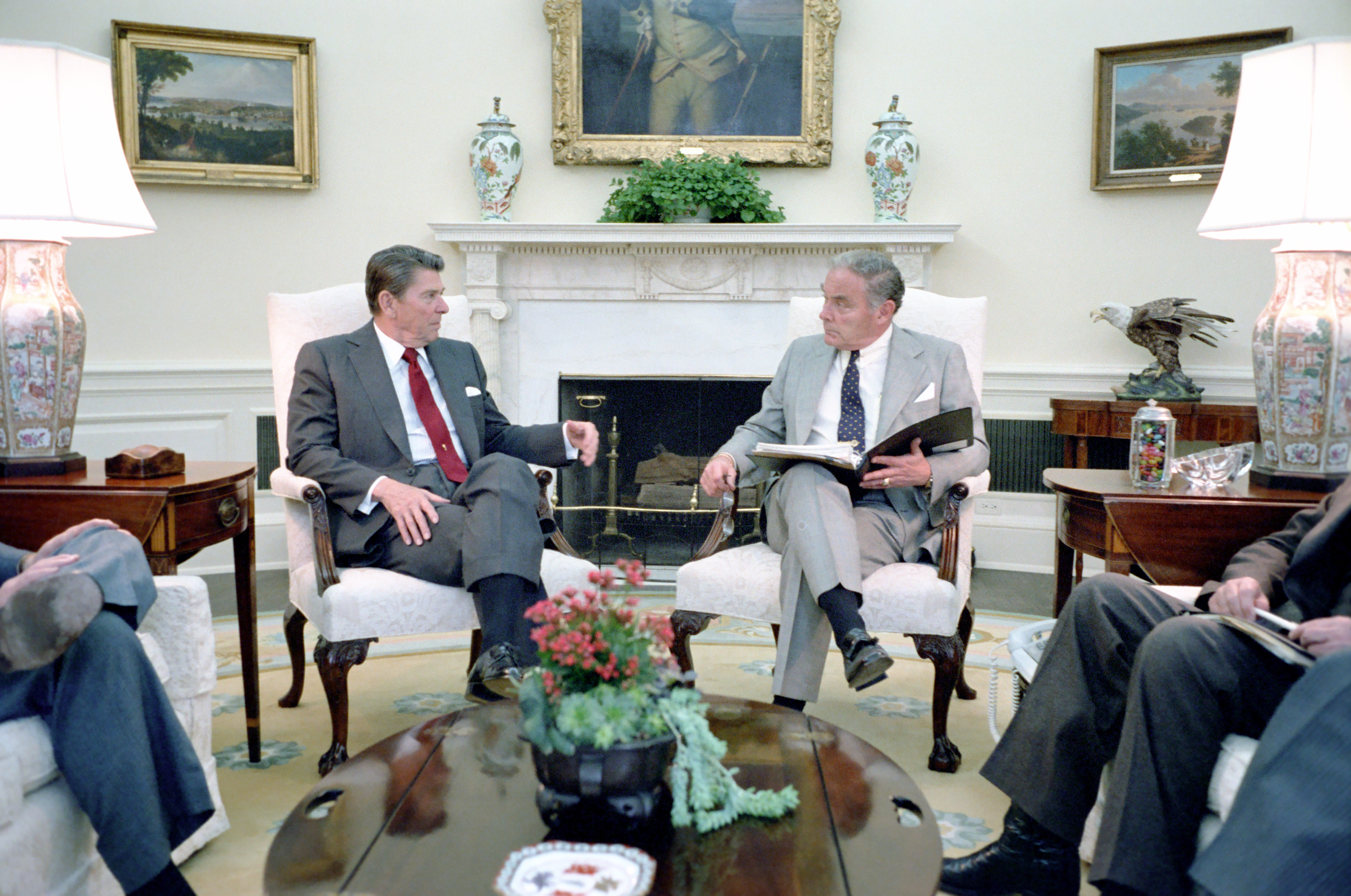
Secretary of State Haig with President Reagan at the Oval Office, 1981

Haig was the second of three career military officers to become secretary of state (George C. Marshall and Colin Powell were the others). His speeches in this role in particular led to the coining of the neologism "Haigspeak," described in a dictionary of neologisms as "Language characterized by pompous obscurity resulting from redundancy, the semantically strained use of words, and verbosity," leading Ambassador Nicko Henderson to offer a prize for the best rendering of the Gettysburg Address in Haigspeak.

=== Initial challenges ===
On 11 December 1980, president-elect Reagan was prepared to publicly announce nearly all of his candidates for the most important cabinet-level posts. Singularly absent from the list of top nominees was his choice for secretary of state, presumed by many at the time to be Alexander Haig. Haig's prospects for Senate confirmation were clouded when Senate Democrats questioned his role in the Watergate scandal. In Haig's defense, North Carolina Senator Jesse Helms claimed to have phoned former president Nixon personally to inquire whether any material on Nixon's unreleased White House tapes could embarrass Haig. According to Helms, Nixon replied, "Not a thing." Haig was eventually confirmed after hearings he described as an "ordeal," during which he received no encouragement from Reagan or his staff.

Several days earlier, on 2 December 1980, as Haig faced these initial challenges to the next step in his political career, four U.S. Catholic missionary women in El Salvador, two of whom were Maryknoll sisters, were beaten, raped and murdered by five Salvadoran national guardsmen ordered to follow them. Their bodies were exhumed from a remote shallow grave two days later in the presence of then-U.S. ambassador to El Salvador Robert E. White. Despite this diplomatically awkward atrocity, the Carter administration soon approved $5.9 million in lethal military assistance to El Salvador's oppressive right-wing government. The incoming Reagan administration expanded that aid to $25 million less than six weeks later.

In justifying the arms shipments, the new administration claimed that the Salvadoran government of José Napoleón Duarte had taken "positive steps" to investigate the murder of four American nuns, but this was disputed by U.S. Ambassador Robert E. White, who said that he could find no evidence the junta was "conducting a serious investigation." White was dismissed from the Foreign Service by Haig because of his complaints. White later asserted that the Reagan administration was determined to ignore and even conceal the complicity of the Salvadoran government and army in the murders.

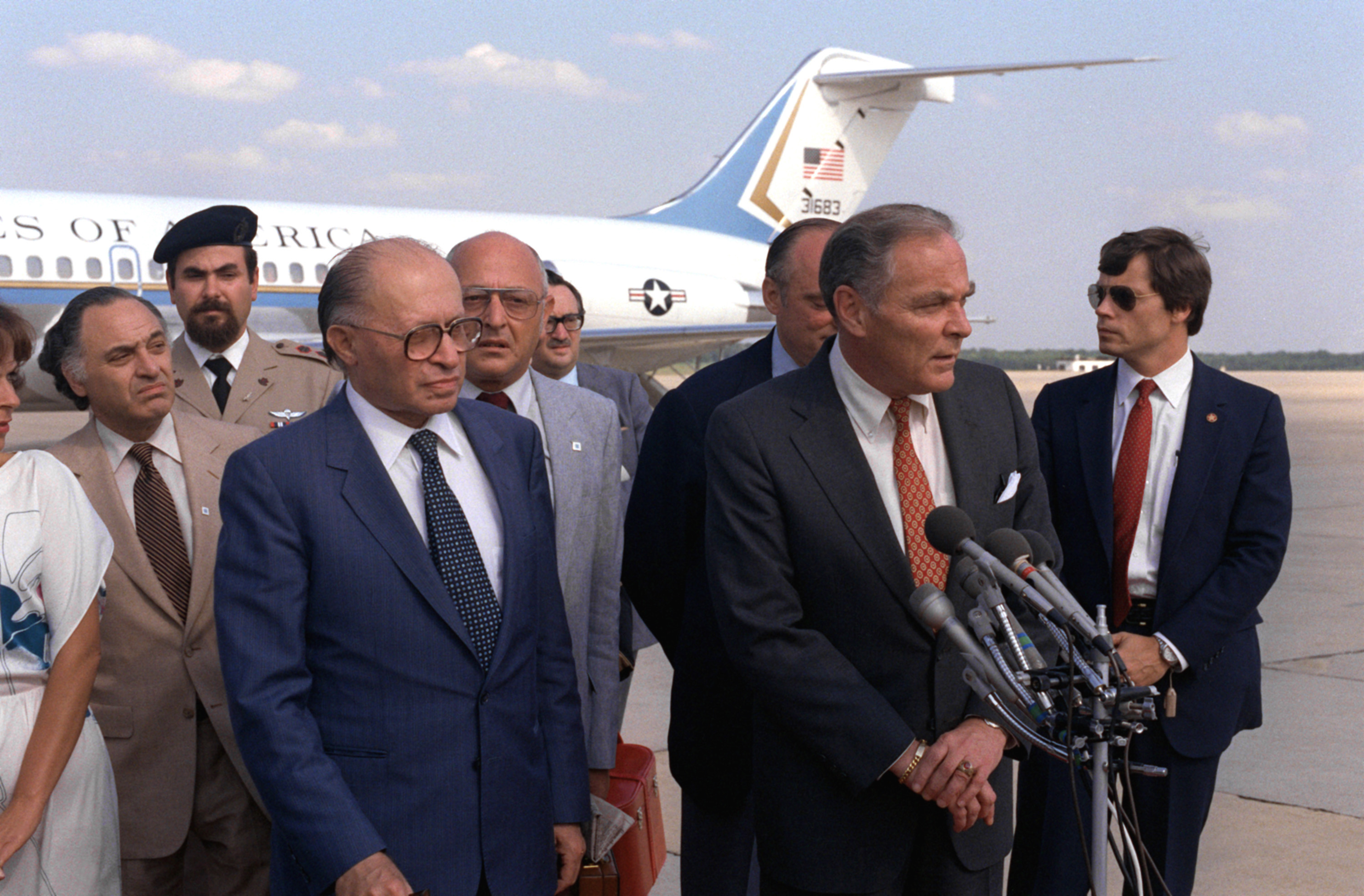
Haig welcoming Israeli Prime Minister Menachem Begin at Andrews Air Force Base, 1982

Throughout the 1980 U.S. presidential campaign, Reagan and his foreign policy advisers faulted the Carter administration's perceived over-emphasis on the human rights abuses committed by authoritarian governments allied to the U.S., labeling it a "double standard" when compared with Carter's treatment of communist-bloc governments. Haig, who described himself as the "vicar" of U.S. foreign policy, believed the human rights violations of a U.S. ally such as El Salvador should be given less attention than the ally's successes against enemies of the U.S., and thus found himself diminishing the murders of the nuns before the House Foreign Affairs Committee in March 1981:

I'd like to suggest to you that some of the investigations would lead one to believe that perhaps the vehicle the nuns were riding in may have tried to run through a roadblock, or may have accidentally been perceived to have been doing so, and there may have been an exchange of fire, and then perhaps those who inflicted the casualties sought to cover it up.

— Alexander Haig, Alexander Haig, House Foreign Affairs committee testimony, quoted by UPI, 19 March 1981

The outcry that immediately followed Haig's insinuation prompted him to emphatically withdraw his speculative suggestions the very next day before the Senate Foreign Relations Committee. Similar public relations miscalculations, by Haig and others, continued to plague the Reagan administration's attempts to build popular support at home for its Central American policies.

=== Reagan assassination attempt ===
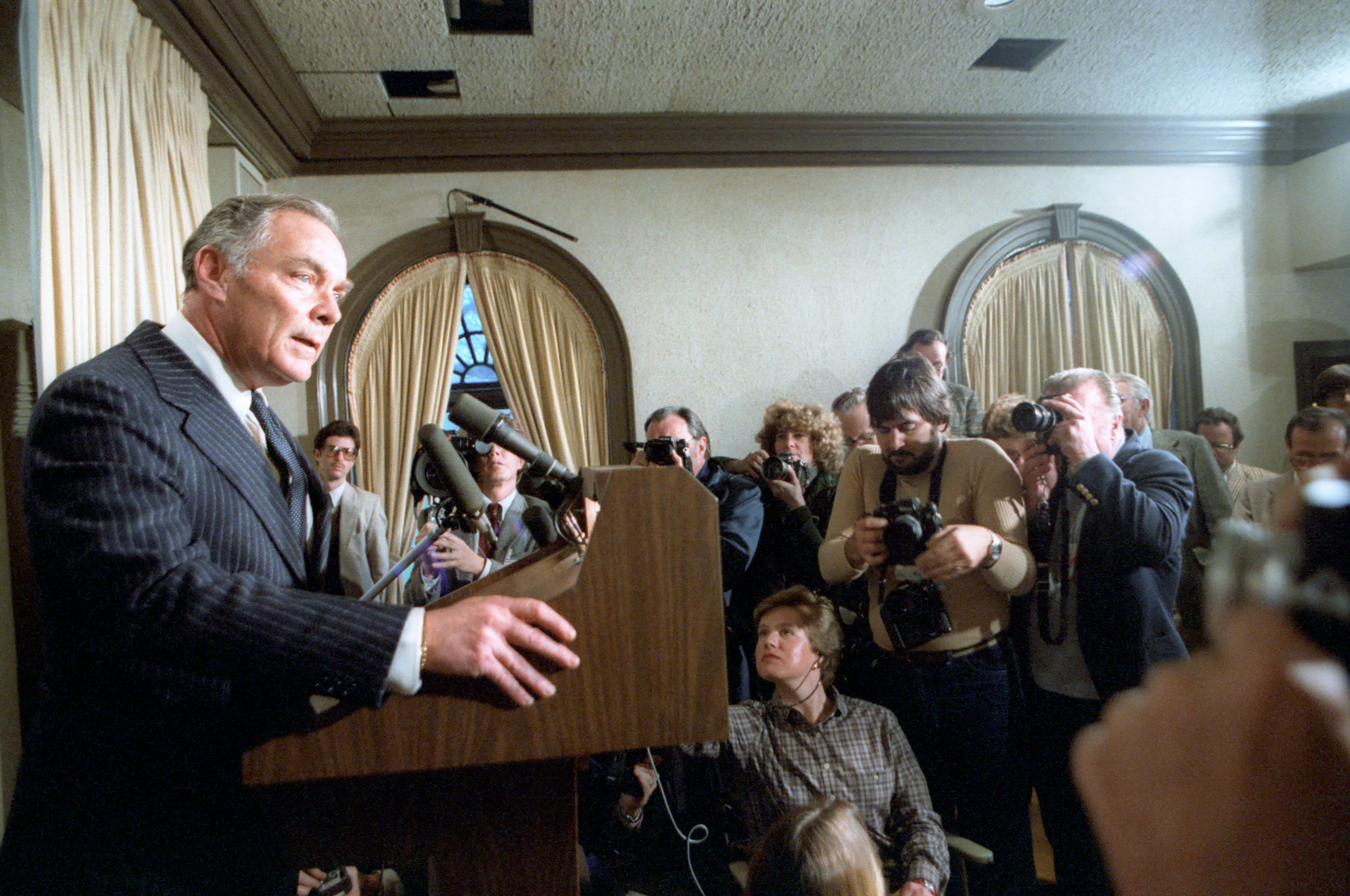
Haig speaking to the press after the Reagan assassination attempt, 1981

In 1981, following the 30 March assassination attempt on Reagan, Haig asserted before reporters, "I am in control here" as a result of Reagan's hospitalization, indicating that, while Reagan had not "transfer[red] the helm," Haig was in fact directing White House crisis management until Vice President George Bush arrived in Washington to assume that role.

Constitutionally, gentlemen, you have the president, the vice president, and the secretary of state in that order, and should the president decide he wants to transfer the helm to the vice president, he will do so. He has not done that. As of now, I am in control here, in the White House, pending return of the vice president and in close touch with him. If something came up, I would check with him, of course.

— Alexander Haig, autobiographical profile in Time magazine, 2 April 1984

The U.S. Constitution, including both the presidential line of succession and the 25th Amendment, dictates what happens when a president is incapacitated. The Speaker of the House (at the time, Tip O'Neill, Democrat) and the president pro tempore of the Senate (at the time, Strom Thurmond, Republican), precede the secretary of state in the line of succession. Haig later clarified,

I wasn't talking about transition. I was talking about the executive branch, who is running the government. That was the question asked. It was not, "Who is in line should the president die?"

— Alexander Haig, interview with 60 Minutes II 23 April 2001

His reputation never recovered after this press conference, and in virtually all of the obituaries published after his death, his quote is referenced in the opening paragraphs.

=== Falklands War ===
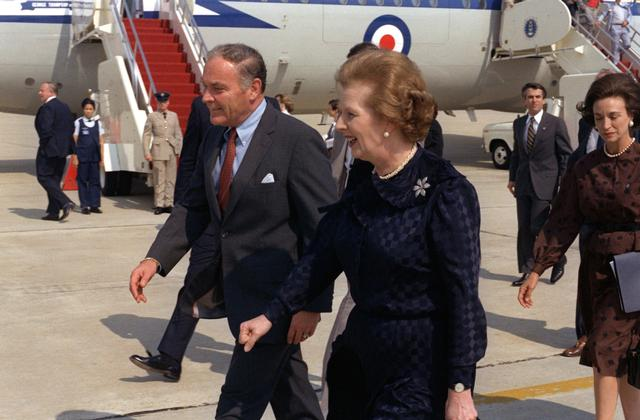
Haig with British prime minister Margaret Thatcher at Andrews Air Force Base, 1982

In April 1982, Haig conducted shuttle diplomacy between the governments of Argentina in Buenos Aires and the United Kingdom in London after Argentina invaded the Falkland Islands. Negotiations collapsed and Haig returned to Washington on 19 April. The British naval fleet then entered the war zone. In December 2012 documents released under the United Kingdom's 30 Year Rule disclosed that Haig planned to reveal British classified military information to Argentina in advance of the recapture of South Georgia Island. The information, which contained the plans for Operation Paraquet, was intended to show the Argentine military junta in Buenos Aires that the United States was a neutral player and could be trusted to act impartially during negotiations to end the conflict. In 2012 it was also revealed via documents released from the Reagan Presidential Library that Haig attempted to persuade Reagan to side with Argentina in the war.

=== 1982 Lebanon War ===
Haig's report to Reagan on 30 January 1982, shows that Haig feared the Israelis might start a war against Lebanon. Critics accused Haig of "greenlighting" the Israeli invasion of Lebanon in June 1982. Haig denied this and said he urged restraint.

=== Taiwan ===
Following the 1979 Joint Communiqué on the Establishment of Diplomatic Relations between the U.S. and the People's Republic of China, Haig opposed weapon sales to Taiwan, stating that China would soon be the world's "most important country."

=== Resignation ===
Haig caused some alarm with his suggestion that a "nuclear warning shot" in Europe might be effective in deterring the Soviet Union. His tenure as secretary of state was often characterized by his clashes with the defense secretary, Caspar Weinberger. Haig, who repeatedly had difficulty with various members of the Reagan administration during his year and a half in office, decided to resign his post on 25 June 1982. President Reagan accepted his resignation on 5 July. Haig was succeeded by George P. Shultz, who was confirmed on July 16.

== 1988 presidential campaign ==
Haig ran unsuccessfully for the 1988 Republican Party presidential nomination. Although he enjoyed relatively high name recognition, Haig never broke out of single digits in national public opinion polls. He was a fierce critic of then–Vice President George H. W. Bush, often doubting Bush's leadership abilities, questioning his role in the Iran–Contra affair, and using the word "wimp" in relation to Bush in an October 1987 debate in Texas. Despite extensive personal campaigning and paid advertising in New Hampshire, Haig remained stuck in last place in the polls. After finishing with less than 1 percent of the vote in the Iowa caucuses and trailing badly in the New Hampshire primary polls, Haig withdrew his candidacy and endorsed Senator Bob Dole. Dole, steadily gaining on Bush after beating him handily a week earlier in the Iowa caucus, ended up losing to Bush in the New Hampshire primary by 10 percentage points. With his momentum regained, Bush easily won the nomination.

== Later life, health, and death ==
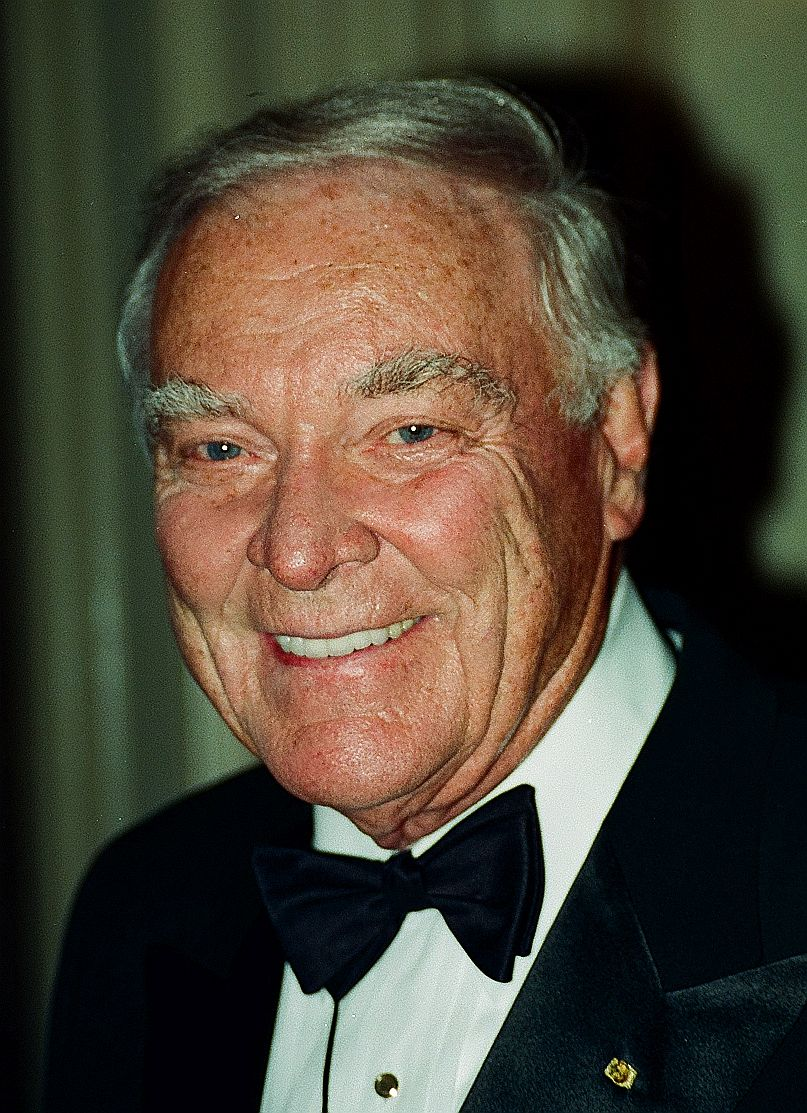
Haig in 2000

In 1980 Haig had a double heart bypass operation.

After leaving the Reagan White House, Haig took a seat on the MGM board of directors in an effort to cultivate a film career. He supervised the development of John Milius' Red Dawn (1984) and made significant changes to it. While heading a consulting firm in the 1980s and 1990s, he served as a director for various struggling businesses, including computer manufacturer Commodore International. He also served as a founding corporate director of America Online.

Haig was the host for several years of the television program World Business Review. At the time of his death, he was the host of 21st Century Business, with each program a weekly business education forum that included business solutions, expert interview, commentary, and field reports. Haig was co-chairman of the American Committee for Peace in the Caucasus, along with Zbigniew Brzezinski and Stephen J. Solarz. He was also member of the Washington Institute for Near East Policy (WINEP) board of advisers.

On 5 January 2006, Haig participated in a meeting at the White House of former secretaries of defense and state to discuss U.S. foreign policy with Bush administration officials. On 12 May 2006, Haig participated in a second White House meeting with 10 former secretaries of state and defense. The meeting included briefings by Donald Rumsfeld and Condoleezza Rice and was followed by a discussion with President George W. Bush. Haig's memoirs—Inner Circles: How America Changed The World—were published in 1992.

On 19 February 2010, a hospital spokesman revealed that the 85-year-old Haig had been hospitalized at Johns Hopkins Hospital in Baltimore since January 28 and remained in critical condition. On February 20, Haig died at the age of 85, from complications from a staphylococcal infection that he had prior to admission. According to The New York Times, his brother, Frank Haig, said the Army was coordinating a mass at Fort Myer in Washington, D.C., and an interment at Arlington National Cemetery, but both had to be delayed by about two weeks owing to the wars in Afghanistan and Iraq. A Mass of Christian Burial was held at the Basilica of the National Shrine of the Immaculate Conception in Washington, D.C., on 2 March 2010. Eulogies were given by Henry Kissinger and long-time aide Sherwood D. Goldberg.

President Barack Obama said in a statement that "General Haig exemplified our finest warrior–diplomat tradition of those who dedicate their lives to public service." Secretary of State Hillary Clinton described Haig as a man who "served his country in many capacities for many years, earning honor on the battlefield, the confidence of presidents and prime ministers, and the thanks of a grateful nation."

== Personal life ==
In the Korean War, as a young officer, Haig served as an aide to Lieutenant General Alonzo Patrick Fox. In 1950 Haig married Fox's daughter, Patricia, and they remained married until his death in 2010.

They had three children: Alexander Patrick Haig, Barbara Haig, and Brian Haig. Haig's younger brother, Frank Haig, was a Jesuit priest and professor emeritus of physics at Loyola University in Baltimore, Maryland.

== Publications ==
Articles

- "Introduction". World Affairs, Vol. 144, No. 4, Statements by Ambassador Max Kampelman before the Madrid Conference on Security and Cooperation in Europe, Spring 1982. JSTOR 20671913 (pp. 299–301)
- "Stalemate: The Public Reaction to Poland". World Affairs, Vol. 144, No. 4, Statements by Ambassador Max Kampelman before the Madrid Conference on Security and Cooperation in Europe, Spring 1982. JSTOR 20671920 (pp. 467–511)
- "U.S. Foreign Policy: A Discussion with Former Secretaries of State Dean Rusk, William P. Rogers, Cyrus R. Vance, and Alexander M. Haig, Jr.". International Studies Notes, Vol. 11, No. 1, Special Edition: The Secretaries of State, Fall 1984. JSTOR 44234902 (pp. 10–20)
- "Reply". Journal of Interamerican Studies and World Affairs, Vol. 27, No. 2, Summer 1985. doi:10.2307/165716 JSTOR 165716 (pp. 23–24)
- "The Challenges to American Leadership". Harvard International Review, Vol. 11, No. 3, Tenth Anniversary Issue – American Foreign Policy: Toward the 1990s, 1989. JSTOR 43648931 (pp. 24–29)
- "Nation Building: A Flawed Approach". The Brown Journal of World Affairs, Vol. 2, No. 1, Winter 1994. JSTOR 24595446 (pp. 7–10)

Books

- Caveat: Realism, Reagan and Foreign Affairs. New York, NY: Macmillan Publishing Company, 1984. ISBN 978-0025473706. 367 pages.
- Inner Circles: How America Changed the World: A Memoir. New York, NY: Warner Books, 1992. ISBN 978-0446515719 LCCN 91-50409. 650 pages.

Contributed works

- "Foreword". Soviet Leaders from Lenin to Gorbachev by Thomas Streissguth. Minneapolis, MN: Oliver Press, 1992. ISBN 978-1881508021 LCCN 92-19903 (pp. 7–8)

== Awards and decorations ==

Combat Infantryman Badge
Distinguished Service Cross	Defense Distinguished Service Medal w/ 1 bronze oak leaf cluster	Army Distinguished Service Medal
Navy Distinguished Service Medal	Air Force Distinguished Service Medal	Silver Star w/ 1 bronze oak leaf cluster
Legion of Merit w/ 2 bronze oak leaf clusters	Distinguished Flying Cross w/ 2 bronze oak leaf clusters	Bronze Star w/ Valor device and 2 bronze oak leaf clusters
Purple Heart	Air Medal w/ bronze award numerals 27	Army Commendation Medal
American Campaign Medal	World War II Victory Medal	Army of Occupation Medal
National Defense Service Medal w/ 1 bronze star	Korean Service Medal w/ 4 bronze campaign stars	Vietnam Service Medal w/ 2 bronze campaign stars
National Order of Vietnam (Commander)	National Order of Vietnam (Knight)	Vietnam Cross of Gallantry w/ Palm
Grand-Cross of the Portuguese Order of Christ	Order of Leopold (Officer)	Order of Merit of the Federal Republic of Germany (Grand Cross 1st Class)
United Nations Korea Medal	Vietnam Campaign Medal	Republic of Korea War Service Medal

Valorous Unit Award
Republic of Korea Presidential Unit Citation	Republic of Vietnam Gallantry Cross Unit Citation	Republic of Vietnam Civil Actions Medal Unit Citation

SHAPE Badge

=== Other honors ===
In 1976, Haig received the Golden Plate Award of the American Academy of Achievement. In 2009, Haig was recognized for their generous gift in support of academic programs at West Point by being inducted into the Eisenhower Society for Lifetime Giving.

Political offices
Preceded by Richard V. Allen	Deputy National Security Advisor; 1970–1973	Succeeded by Brent Scowcroft
Preceded by H. R. Haldeman	White House Chief of Staff; 1973–1974	Succeeded by Donald Rumsfeld
Preceded by Edmund Muskie	United States Secretary of State; 1981–1982	Succeeded by George P. Shultz
Military offices
Preceded by Bruce Palmer Jr.	Vice Chief of Staff of the Army; 1973	Succeeded by Frederick C. Weyand
Preceded by Andrew Goodpaster	Supreme Allied Commander Europe; 1974–1979	Succeeded by Bernard W. Rogers
