= Sean Drummond =

Maj./Lt. Col. Sean Drummond
- Sean Drummond series character
- First appearance: Secret Sanction (2001)
- Created by: Brian Haig

In-universe information
- Occupation: US Army JAG lawyer
- Relatives: John Drummond (brother), unnamed father and mother

Lt. Col. Sean Drummond is the protagonist of a series of novels written by Brian Haig. He was born in 1965. Son of a US Army colonel (who was injured in the Vietnam War), he joined the US Army as an infantry officer and was later recruited by a special forces unit nicknamed "The Outfit", until he was injured in combat and was forced to change his career path. He became a member of a special group of JAG lawyers (Judge Advocate General Corps), which handles cases involving members of the US special forces or the military intelligence community. In the beginning of his career as a JAG lawyer, he worked primarily in what is known as "Black Court," (officially called SPECAT Court) where special forces members are tried without risk of exposing their missions. He went to Georgetown Law and graduated with the second highest grade in his class.

== Appearances ==
- Secret Sanction, Warner Books (2001), ISBN 0-446-52743-2
- Mortal Allies, Warner Books (2002), ISBN 0-446-53026-3
- The Kingmaker, Warner Books (2003), ISBN 0-446-53055-7
- Private Sector, Warner Books (2004), ISBN 0-446-53178-2
- The President's Assassin, Warner Books (2005), ISBN 0-446-57667-0
- Man In The Middle, Warner Books (2007), ISBN 0-446-53056-5
- The Night Crew, Warner Books (2015), ISBN 147782748X
