= 102nd Training Division =

US Army training formation

102nd Infantry Division 102nd Training Division (Maneuver Support)
- 102nd Infantry Division shoulder sleeve insignia
- Active: 24 June 1921–12 March 1946; 19 May1947–31 December 1965; December 1967–October 1995 (102nd ARCOM); 16 September 2008–present (102d Training Div.)
- Country: United States
- Branch: United States Army Reserve
- Role: Training (Maneuver Support)
- Size: Division
- Part of: 80th Training Command
- Nickname: Ozark (Special Designation)
- Mottos: Distinction, Valor, Marksmanship
- Garrison: Fort Leonard Wood, Missouri
- Engagements: World War II; Rhineland; Central Europe Campaign

Commanders
- Current commander: BG Noel Palmer
- Command Sergeant Major: CSM Neil J. Pierce

Insignia
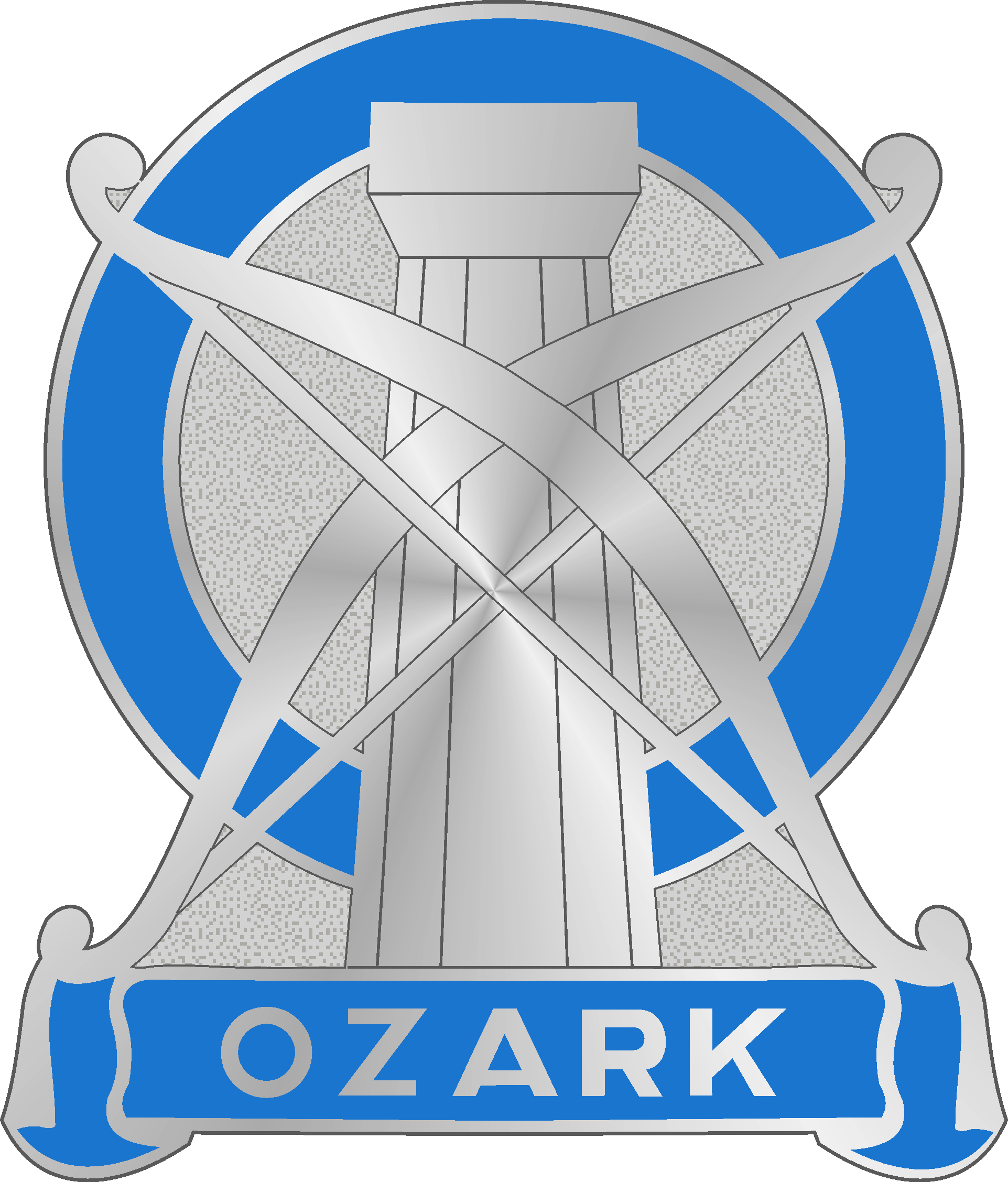
- Distinctive unit insignia

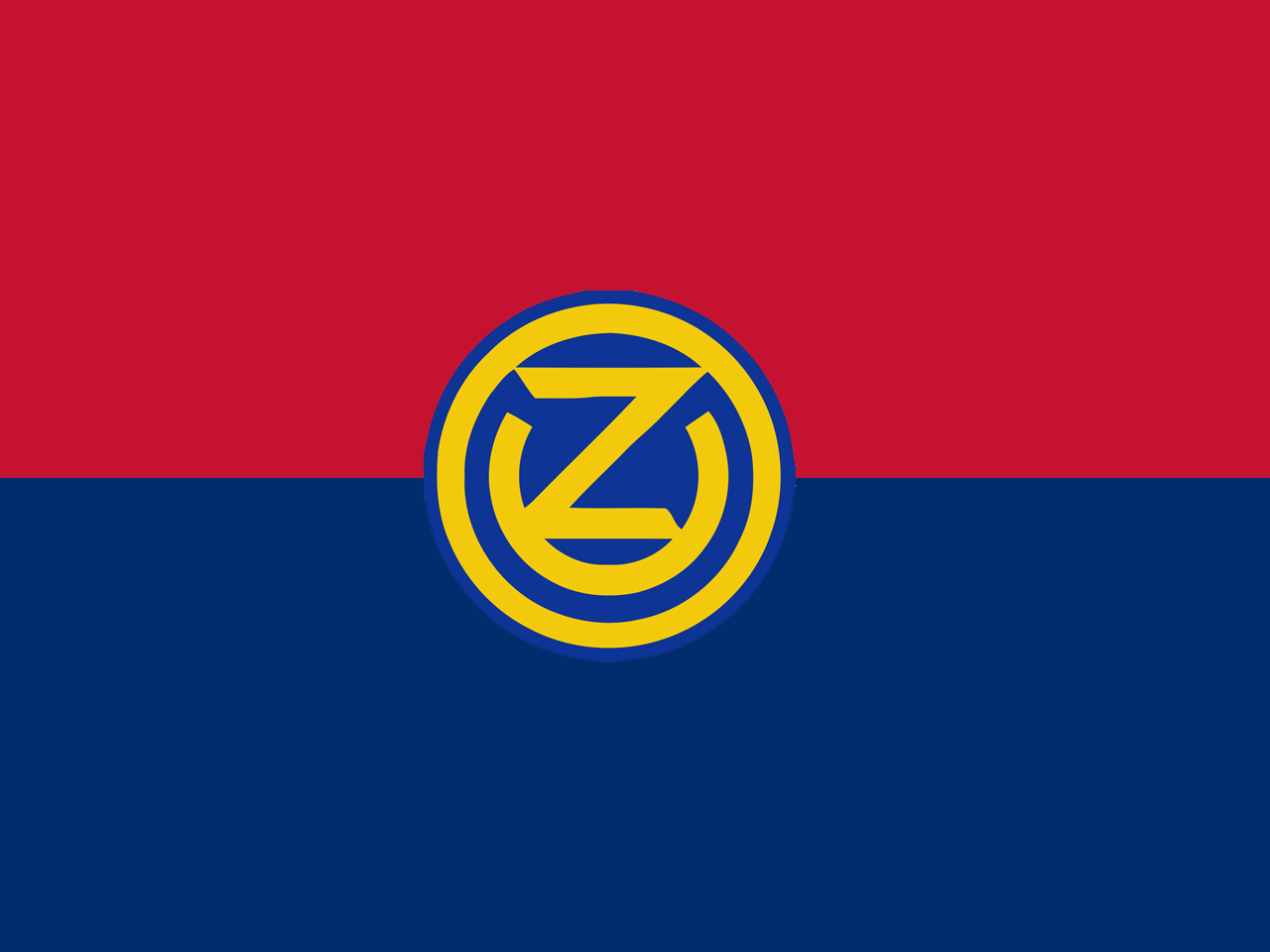
- Flag of the United States Army 102nd Training Division

The 102nd Infantry Division ("Ozark") was a unit of the United States Army in World War II. The unit is currently active as the 102nd Training Division (Maneuver Support).

== History ==
=== World War I ===
On 23 July 1918, the War Department directed the organization of the 102nd Division at Camp Dix, New Jersey. Plans called for the division to include a headquarters, headquarters troop, the 203rd Infantry Brigade (405th and 406th Infantry Regiments and 380th Machine Gun Battalion), 204th Infantry Brigade (407th and 408th Infantry Regiments and 381st Machine Gun Battalion), 379th Machine Gun Battalion, 177th Field Artillery Brigade (379th-381st Field Artillery Regiments and 29th Trench Mortar Battery), 327th Engineers, 327th Field Signal Battalion, and 327th Train Headquarters and Military Police (Ammunition, Engineer, Sanitary, and Supply Trains). It was intended that the 203rd Infantry Brigade would be organized in France from the 60th and 61st Pioneer Infantry Regiments. The 29th Trench Mortar Battery was formed at Camp Kearny, California, in August 1918. No division staff members were ever appointed, but cadre personnel for the division were designated and reported to Camp Dix before orders to demobilize were given on 30 November 1918 after the armistice with Germany.

=== Interwar period ===
The division was constituted in the Organized Reserve on 24 June 1921, allotted to the Seventh Corps Area, and assigned to the XVII Corps, with Arkansas and Missouri as its home area. The headquarters was organized on 2 September 1921 at 3rd and Olive Streets in St. Louis, and relocated in 1923 to the Old Customhouse. The headquarters remained there until activated for World War II. To encourage esprit de corps, the division adopted the nickname “Ozark” after the mountainous region that ran through both states, and the division staff published a newsletter titled “Ozark.” The division formed rapidly and by November 1922, it had 95 percent of the officers required by its peacetime establishment tables of organization.

The designated mobilization and training station for the division was Fort Riley, Kansas. The headquarters and staff usually trained at Fort Leavenworth, Kansas. The subordinate infantry regiments of the division held their summer training primarily with the 17th Infantry Regiment at Fort Leavenworth. Other units, such as the special troops, artillery, engineers, aviation, medical, and quartermaster, trained at various posts in the Sixth and Seventh Corps Areas, often with the active units of the 7th Division. For example, the division’s artillery trained at Fort Riley; the 327th Engineer Regiment also trained at Fort Riley with Troop A, 9th Engineer Squadron; the 327th Medical Regiment trained at the Medical Corps training camp at Fort Snelling, Minnesota; and the 327th Observation Squadron trained with the 16th Observation Squadron at Marshall Army Airfield, Kansas. In addition to the unit training camps, the infantry regiments of the division rotated responsibility to conduct the Citizens Military Training Camps held at Fort Leavenworth each year. On a number of occasions, the division participated in Seventh Corps Area and Fourth Army command post exercises in conjunction with other Regular Army, National Guard, and Organized Reserve units. Unlike the Regular and Guard units in the Seventh Corps Area, the 102nd Division did not participate in the various Seventh Corps Area maneuvers and the Fourth Army maneuvers of 1937, 1940, and 1941 as an organized unit due to lack of enlisted personnel and equipment. Instead, the officers and a few enlisted reservists were assigned to Regular and Guard units to fill vacant slots and bring the units up to war strength for the exercises.

In the 1920s and 1930s Harry S. Truman, a lieutenant colonel in the Officers' Reserve Corps, commanded the division's 1st Battalion, 379th Field Artillery Regiment. After promotion to colonel, Truman advanced to command of the 379th Field Artillery Regiment.

=== World War II ===
- Ordered into active military service: 15 September 1942 at Camp Maxey, Texas
- Overseas: 12 September 1944
- Campaigns: Rhineland, Central Europe
- Days of combat: 173
- Distinguished Unit Citations: 4
- Awards: DSC-8; DSM-1; SS-686; LM-15; SM-39; BSM-5,498; AM-91.
- Commanders: Major General John B. Anderson (September 1942 – December 1943), Major General Frank A. Keating (8 January 1944 – February 1946), Brigadier General Charles M. Busbee (February 1946 to inactivation).
- Assistant Division Commanders (partial list): Lloyd D. Brown (May 1942 – February 1943), Alonzo Patrick Fox (April 1943 – May 1945)
- Returned to U.S.: 11 March 1946.
- Inactivated: 23 March 1946.

==== Division organization ====
Before Organized Reserve infantry divisions were ordered into active military service, they were reorganized on paper as "triangular" divisions under the 1940 tables of organization. The headquarters companies of the two infantry brigades were consolidated into the division's cavalry reconnaissance troop, and one infantry regiment was removed by inactivation. The field artillery brigade headquarters and headquarters battery became the headquarters and headquarters battery of the division artillery. Its three field artillery regiments were reorganized into four battalions; one battalion was taken from each of the two 75 mm gun regiments to form two 105 mm howitzer battalions, the brigade's ammunition train was reorganized as the third 105 mm howitzer battalion, and the 155 mm howitzer battalion was formed from the 155 mm howitzer regiment. The engineer, medical, and quartermaster regiments were reorganized into battalions. In 1942, divisional quartermaster battalions were split into ordnance light maintenance companies and quartermaster companies, and the division's headquarters and military police company, which had previously been a combined unit, was split. The 408th Infantry Regiment was inactivated by relief of remaining Reserve personnel on 6 January 1942, and disbanded on 11 November 1944.

The 102nd Infantry Division was ordered into active military service on 15 September 1942 at Camp Maxey, Texas. The division consisted of the following units:

102nd Infantry Division organization (click to enlarge)

- 102nd Infantry Division
  - 102nd Infantry Division Headquarters
  - 102nd Cavalry Reconnaissance Troop (Mechanized) (M3 scout cars and then M8 Greyhound armored cars)
  - 405th Infantry Regiment
    - Headquarters and Headquarters Company
    - 3× Infantry battalions
      - each battalion consists of: 1× Headquarters and Headquarters Company, 3× Rifle companies, 1× Heavy Weapons Company
    - Cannon Company (T12 Gun Motor Carriages and T19 Howitzer Motor Carriages, later replaced by either M3 105mm towed howitzers or M7 Priest self propelled howitzers)
    - Anti-Tank Company (M3 37mm anti-tank guns, which were replaced by 1944 with M1 57mm anti-tank guns)
    - Service Company
  - 406th Infantry Regiment
    - same organization as 405th Infantry Regiment
  - 407th Infantry Regiment
    - same organization as 405th Infantry Regiment
  - 102nd Infantry Division Artillery
    - Headquarters and Headquarters Battery
    - 379th Field Artillery Battalion
      - Headquarters and Headquarters Battery
      - 3× Batteries (M2 105mm towed howitzers)
      - Service Battery
    - 380th Field Artillery Battalion
      - same organization as 379th Field Artillery Battalion
    - 381st Field Artillery Battalion
      - Headquarters and Headquarters Battery
      - 3× Batteries (M1 155mm towed howitzers)
      - Service Battery
    - 927th Field Artillery Battalion
      - same organization as 379th Field Artillery Battalion
  - Headquarters Special Troops
    - Headquarters Company, 102nd Infantry Division
    - 102nd Signal Company
    - 102nd Quartermaster Company
    - 802nd Ordnance Light Maintenance Company
    - Military Police Platoon
    - 102nd Infantry Division Band (attached)
  - 327th Engineer Combat Battalion
    - Headquarters and Headquarters and Service Company
    - 3× Engineer combat companies
  - 327th Medical Battalion
    - Headquarters and Headquarters Detachment
    - 3× Collecting companies
    - Clearing Company

==== Combat chronicle ====
The 102nd Infantry Division, under the command of Major General Frank A. Keating, arrived on the Western Front in the European Theater of Operations (ETO) at Cherbourg, France, 23 September 1944, and, after a short period of training near Valognes, moved to the German-Netherlands border. On 26 October, elements attached to other divisions entered combat and on 3 November the division assumed responsibility for the sector from the Wurm to Waurichen. A realignment of sectors and the return of elements placed the 102nd in full control of its units for the first time, 24 November 1944, as it prepared for an attack to the Roer. The attack jumped off, 29 November, and carried the division to the river through Welz, Flossdorf, and Linnich.

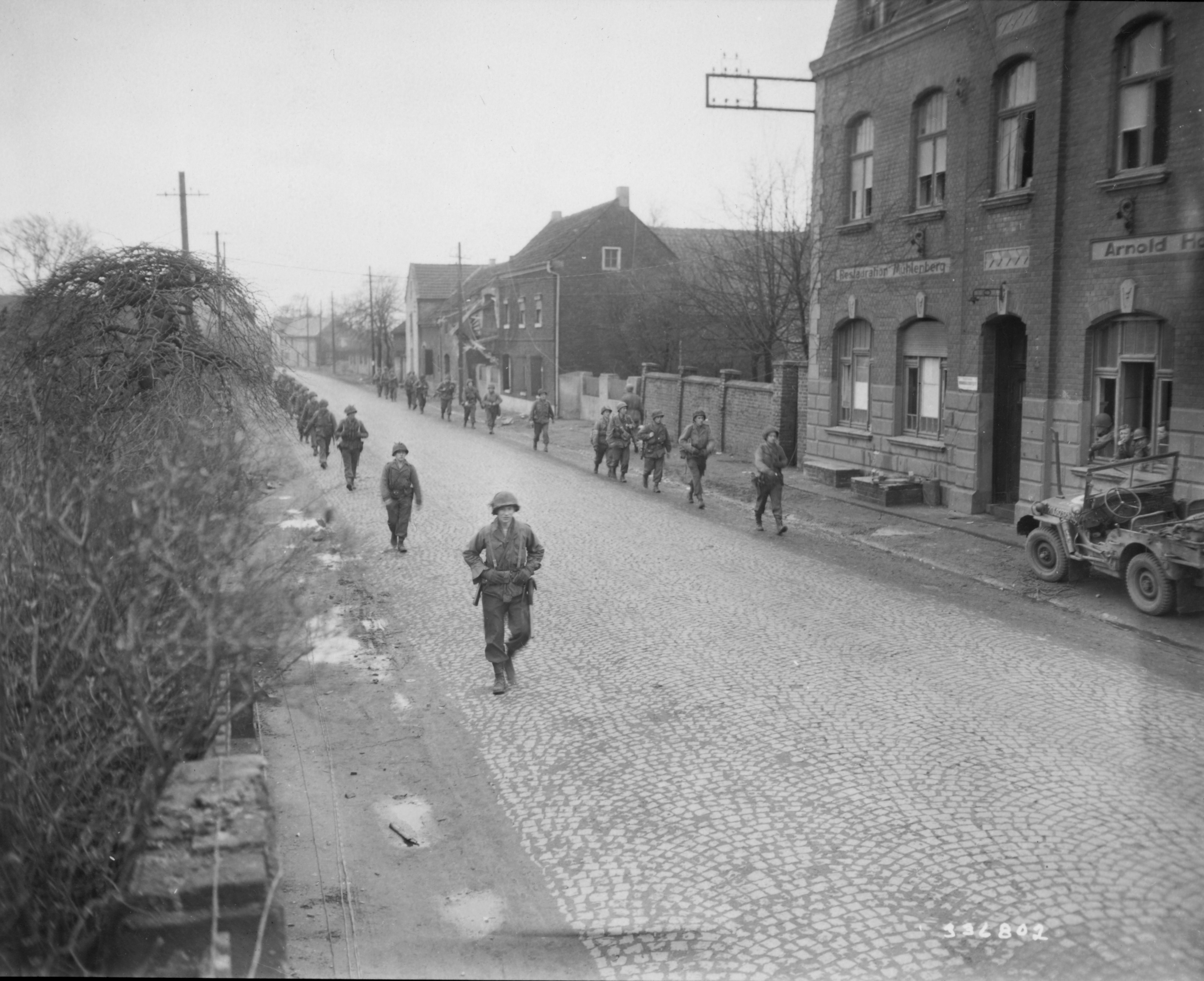
Soldiers of B Company, 406th Infantry Regiment, 102nd Division in Uerdingen, Germany. 11 March 1945.

After a period of aggressive patrolling along the Roer, 4–19 December, the division took over the XIII Corps sector from the Wurm River, north of the village of Wurm, to Barmen on the south, and trained for river crossing. On 23 February 1945, the 102d attacked across the Roer (Operation Grenade), advanced toward Lövenich and Erkelenz, bypassed Mönchengladbach, took Krefeld, 3 March, and reached the Rhine. During March the division was on the defensive along the Rhine, its sector extending from Homburg south to Düsseldorf. Crossing the river on 9 April on pontoon bridge, the division attacked in the Wesergebirge, meeting stiff opposition. After 3 days and nights of terrific enemy resistance Wilsede and Hessisch-Oldendorf fell, 12 April 1945, and the 102d pushed on to the Elbe, meeting little resistance. Breitenfeld fell, 15 April, and the division outposted the Elbe River, 48 miles from Berlin, its advance halted on orders. Storkau experienced fighting on the 16th, EHRA on the 21st along with Fallersleben. On 3 May 1945 the 102nd shook hands with the Russian 156th Division just outside Berlin.

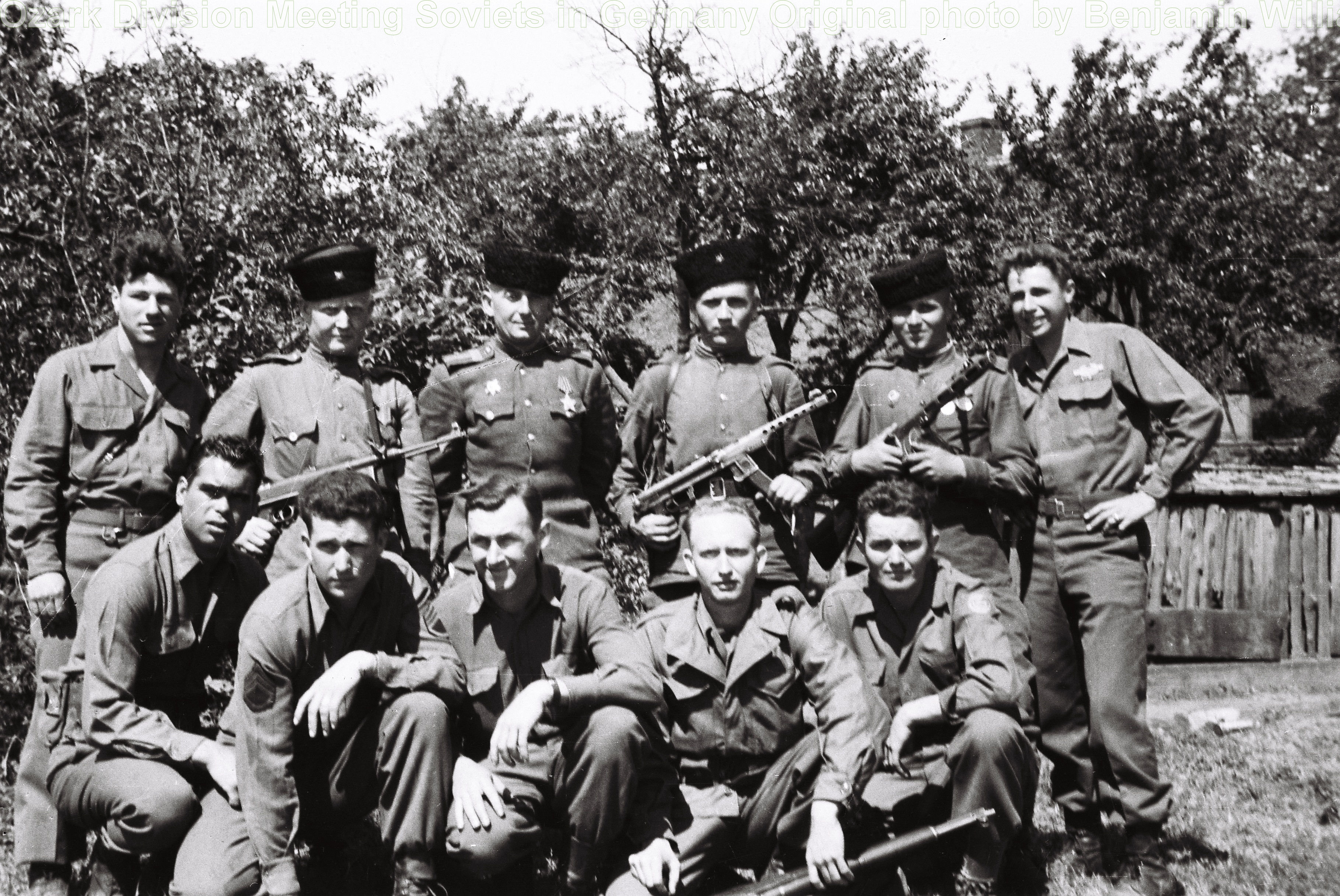
Americans Meeting the Soviets

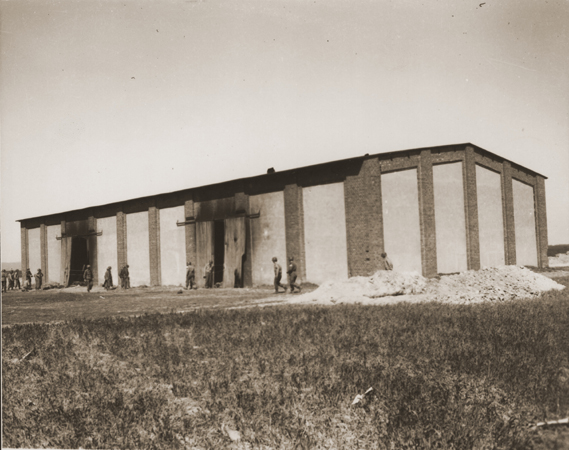
The barn set on fire in the Gardelegen Massacre

On 15 April the division discovered a war crime in Gardelegen: the Isenschnibbe Barn Atrocity. About 1,200 prisoners from the Mittelbau-Dora and Hannover-Stöcken concentration camps were forced from a train into an empty barn measuring approximately a hundred by fifty feet on the outskirts of the town. The barn was then set afire, killing those inside. About 1,016 people were killed. However, two men survived, buried under a shield of dead bodies, protecting them from the gunfire and flames. When the first soldiers arrived at the barn, the two came crawling out from under the dead and burning bodies. Major General Keating ordered that the nearby civilian population be forced to view the site and to disinter and rebury the victims in a new cemetery. After digging the graves and burying the bodies, they erected a Christian Cross or a Jewish Star of David over each grave and enclosed the site with a white fence. Today both the former crime scene and the Cemetery of Honour are parts of the Isenschnibbe Barn Memorial Gardelegen.

The division patrolled and maintained defensive positions until the end of hostilities in Europe, then moved to Gotha for occupation duty.

==== Casualties ====
- Total battle casualties: 4,922
- Killed in action: 932
- Wounded in action: 3,668
- Missing in action: 185
- Prisoners of war: 137

==== Assignments in ETO ====
- 28 August 1944: Ninth Army, 12th Army Group.
- 5 September 1944: III Corps.
- 10 October 1944: XVI Corps.
- 3 November 1944: XIX Corps.
- 7 November 1944: XIII Corps.
- 20 December 1944: XIII Corps, Ninth Army (attached to the British 21st Army Group), 12th Army Group.
- 1 April 1945: XIII Corps (for administration), Ninth Army, but attached for operations to the Fifteenth Army.
- 4 April 1945: XIII Corps, Ninth Army, 12th Army Group.

=== Post-war History (1946–1965) ===
- Headquarters and Headquarters Company, 102nd Infantry Division
  - Inactivated 12 March 1946 at Camp Kilmer, New Jersey.
  - Assigned 22 October 1946 to the Fifth Army.
  - Activated 19 May 1947 at St. Louis, Missouri.
  - Inactivated 31 December 1965 at St. Louis, Missouri.

On 1 June 1959, the division was reorganized as a Pentomic Division. The division's three infantry regiments were inactivated and their elements reorganized into five infantry battle groups. On 1 April 1963, the division was reorganized as a Reorganization Objective Army Division (ROAD). Three Brigade Headquarters were activated and Infantry units were reorganized into battalions:

- 405th Infantry Regiment
  - Inactivated 1 June 1946 at Bayreuth, Germany.
  - Activated 31 October 1946 with headquarters at Minneapolis, Minnesota.
  - Inactivated 3 January 1947 at Minneapolis.
  - Activated 24 January 1947 with headquarters at St. Louis, Missouri.
  - Headquarters relocated to Danville, Illinois 15 March 1948, to Anna, Illinois 1 February 1950, to Marion, Illinois 2 January 1956, and to East St. Louis, Illinois 24 November 1956.
  - Inactivated 31 May 1959 at East St. Louis, concurrently, Headquarters and Headquarters Company consolidated with Headquarters and Headquarters Company Headquarters, 3d Battle Group, 9th Infantry.
  - The Battle Group was activated 1 June 1959 with headquarters at Quincy, Illinois. Reorganized and redesignated as the 3d Battalion, 9th Infantry on 1 April 1963, and inactivated at Quincy on 31 December 1965.
- 406th Infantry Regiment
  - Inactivated 16 March 1946 at Camp Kilmer, New Jersey.
  - Activated 3 January 1947 with headquarters at Kansas City, Missouri.
  - Inactivated 11 May 1959 at Kansas City, concurrently, Headquarters and Headquarters Company consolidated with Headquarters and Headquarters Company Headquarters, 3d Battle Group, 14th Infantry.
  - The Battle Group was activated 1 June 1959 with headquarters at Kansas City, Missouri. Reorganized and redesignated as the 3d Battalion, 14th Infantry on 1 April 1963, and inactivated at Kansas City on 31 December 1965.
- 407th Infantry Regiment
  - Inactivated 16 March 1946 at Camp Kilmer, New Jersey.
  - Activated 15 March 1948 with headquarters at St. Louis, Missouri.
  - Inactivated 31 May 1959 at St. Louis, concurrently, Headquarters and Headquarters Company consolidated with Headquarters and Headquarters Company Headquarters, 4th Battle Group, 6th Infantry.
  - The Battle Group was activated 1 June 1959 with headquarters at St. Louis, Missouri. Reorganized and redesignated as the 4th Battalion, 6th Infantry on 1 April 1963, and inactivated at St. Louis on 31 December 1965.

Two additional Battle Groups were also formed:

- The 3d Battle Group, 7th Infantry was activated 1 June 1959 with headquarters in Danville, Illinois and inactivated there on 1 April 1963.
- The 3d Battle Group, 4th Infantry was activated 1 June 1959 with headquarters at Fairfield, Illinois. Reorganized and redesignated as the 3d Battalion, 4th Infantry on 1 April 1963, and inactivated at Fairfield on 31 December 1965.

The division and subordinate elements were inactivated on 31 December 1965. Later, when the 102d Army Reserve Command was formed as a regional headquarters for Army Reserve units within the same general area where the 102d Infantry Division had been located, the shoulder sleeve insignia was authorized for wear by units of the 102d ARCOM, such as the military police unit stationed at Richards Gebaur AFB near Belton, Missouri.

The lineage of the 102d Division is perpetuated by the 102d Training Division. The division was reactivated on September 16, 2008 as the 102nd Training Division; with headquarters concurrently activated at Fort Snelling, Minnesota. The division's location was changed on April 1, 2017 to Fort Leonard Wood, Missouri,

== Current organization ==
The 102nd Training Division (Maneuver Support) is a subordinate unit of the 80th Training Command (The Army School System — TASS). As of January 2026 the division consists of the following units:

- 102nd Training Division (Maneuver Support), at Fort Leonard Wood (MO)
  - High Tech Regional Training Site-Maintenance Tobyhanna, in Tobyhanna (PA)
  - High Tech Regional Training Site-Maintenance Sacramento, in Sacramento (CA)
  - 1st Brigade (Engineer), at Fort Leonard Wood (MO)
    - 1st Battalion, 80th Regiment (Engineer), in Kingwood (WV)
      - Detachment 1, 1st Battalion, 80th Regiment (Engineer), in Wheeling (WV)
      - Detachment 2, 1st Battalion, 80th Regiment (Engineer), in New Windsor (NY)
    - 1st Battalion, 95th Regiment (Engineer), at Fort Leonard Wood (MO)
      - Detachment 1, 1st Battalion, 95th Regiment (Engineer), in St. Charles (MO)
    - 1st Battalion, 100th Regiment (Engineer), in Knoxville (TN)
      - Detachment 1, 1st Battalion, 100th Regiment (Engineer), at Fort Sheridan (IL)
    - 12th Battalion, 104th Regiment (Engineer), in Sioux Falls (SD)
    - 1st Battalion, 108th Regiment (Engineer), at Fort Jackson (SC)
      - Detachment 1, 1st Battalion, 108th Regiment (Engineer), in Alexandria (AL)
  - 2nd Brigade (Military Police), at Fort Leonard Wood (MO)
    - 2nd Battalion, 80th Regiment (Military Police), in Owings Mills (MD)
      - Detachment 1, 2nd Battalion, 80th Regiment (Military Police), at Fort Totten (NY)
    - 2nd Battalion, 95th Regiment (Military Police), in Baton Rouge (LA)
    - 2nd Battalion, 100th Regiment (Military Police), in Nashville (TN)
      - Detachment 1, 2nd Battalion, 100th Regiment (Military Police), in Inkster (MI)
    - 1st Battalion, 104th Regiment (Military Police), in Aurora (CO)
    - 2nd Battalion, 108th Regiment (Military Police), at Fort Jackson (SC)
      - Detachment 1, 2nd Battalion, 108th Regiment (Military Police), in West Palm Beach (FL)
  - 3rd Brigade (Chemical), at Fort Leonard Wood (MO)
    - 4th Battalion, 80th Regiment (Chemical), in Farrell (PA)
    - 4th Battalion, 95th Regiment (Chemical), at Camp Robinson (AR)
    - 4th Battalion, 100th Regiment (Chemical), in Homewood (IL)
      - Detachment 1, 4th Battalion, 100th Regiment (Chemical), at Fort Knox (KY)
    - 3rd Battalion, 104th Regiment (Chemical), at Joint Base Lewis–McChord (WA)
    - 4th Battalion, 108th Regiment (Chemical), at Redstone Arsenal (AL)
      - Detachment 1, 4th Battalion, 108th Regiment (Chemical), at Fort Jackson (SC)
      - Detachment 2, 4th Battalion, 108th Regiment (Chemical), in Alexandria (AL)
  - 4th Brigade (Military Intelligence), at Fort Huachuca (AZ)
    - 6th Battalion, 95th Regiment (Military Intelligence), at Camp Bullis (TX)
    - 6th Battalion, 98th Regiment (Military Intelligence), at Fort Devens (MA)
    - 11th Battalion, 100th Regiment (Military Intelligence), at Fort McCoy (WI)
    - 5th Battalion, 104th Regiment (Military Intelligence), at Fort Huachuca (AZ)
    - 6th Battalion, 108th Regiment (Military Intelligence), at Fort Bragg (NC)
  - 5th Brigade (Signal), at Fort Gordon (GA)
    - 3rd Battalion, 80th Regiment (Signal) Scranton (PA)
      - Detachment 1, 3rd Battalion, 80th Regiment (Signal) Cranston (RI)
    - 3rd Battalion, 95th Regiment (Signal), at Kirtland Air Force Base (NM)
    - 3rd Battalion, 100th Regiment (Signal), in Indianapolis (IN)
      - Detachment 1, 3rd Battalion, 100th Regiment (Signal), at Fort Knox (KY)
    - 2nd Battalion, 104th Regiment (Signal), in Sacramento (CA)
    - 3rd Battalion, 108th Regiment (Signal), in Augusta (GA)
      - Detachment 1, 3rd Battalion, 108th Regiment (Signal), at Redstone Arsenal (AL)
  - 6th Brigade (Civil Affairs and Psychological Operations), at Fort Totten (NY)
    - 5th Battalion, 95th Regiment (Civil Affairs and Psychological Operations), in Lubbock (TX)
    - 5th Battalion, 98th Regiment (Civil Affairs and Psychological Operations), in Edison (NJ)
    - 12th Battalion, 100th Regiment (Civil Affairs and Psychological Operations), in Twinsburg (OH)
    - 4th Battalion, 104th Regiment (Civil Affairs and Psychological Operations), in Mountain View (CA)
    - 5th Battalion, 108th Regiment (Civil Affairs and Psychological Operations), at Fort Bragg (NC)
