= Alonzo Patrick Fox =

United States Army general (1895–1984)

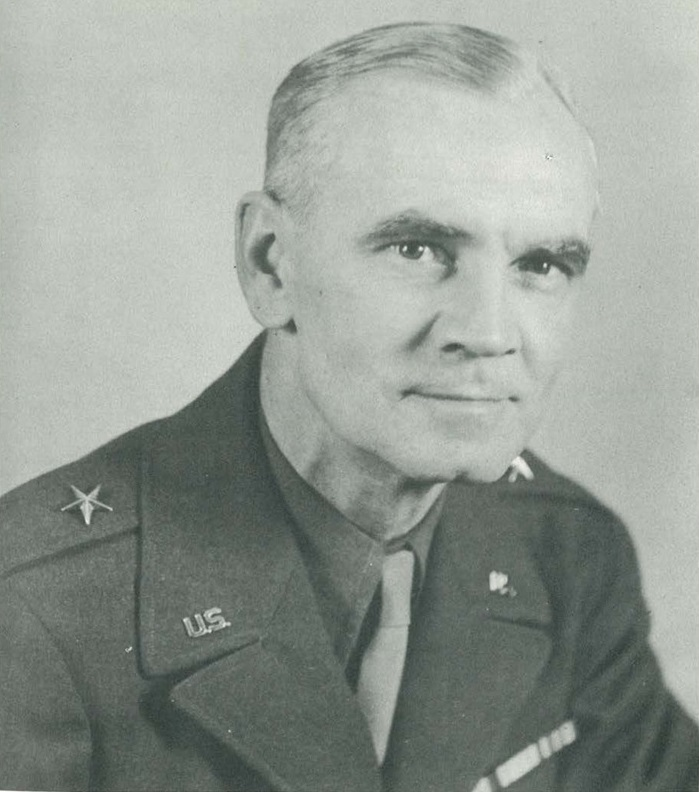
- Fox as assistant division commander of the 102nd Infantry Division during World War II.
- Born: 11 November 1895; Saint Louis, Missouri, United States
- Died: 19 December 1984 (aged 89); Washington, D.C., United States
- Burial place: Arlington National Cemetery, Virginia, United States
- Education: St. Louis University (BCS, 1917); United States Army Command and General Staff College
- Relatives: Alexander Haig (son-in-law)
- Military career
- Allegiance: United States
- Branch: United States Army
- Service years: 1917–1957
- Rank: Lieutenant General
- Service number: 0-8434
- Unit: Infantry Branch
- Commands: Army Pictorial Service; War Department Personnel Center, Fort Sam Houston, Texas; Office of Economic and Industrial Affairs, Supreme Command Allied Powers
- Conflicts: World War I World War II; Korean War
- Awards: Army Distinguished Service Medal; Silver Star; Legion of Merit; Bronze Star
- Other work: Deputy Assistant Secretary of Defense for National Security Council Affairs

Alonzo Patrick Fox (11 November 1895 – 19 December 1984) was a career officer in the United States Army. He attained the rank of lieutenant general, and was prominent in the 1950s as military advisor to the Assistant Secretary of Defense for International Security Affairs. Following his military retirement, Fox served as Deputy Assistant Secretary of Defense for National Security Council Affairs. He was the father-in-law of Alexander Haig.

== Early life ==
Alonzo P. "Pat" Fox was born in St. Louis, Missouri on 11 November 1895, a son of Thomas L. Fox and Mary A. (Van Tournehout) Fox. He attended the parochial schools of St. Louis, and was a 1914 graduate of St. Louis Academy (now St. Louis University High School). He then attended St. Louis University, from which he graduated with a Bachelor of Commercial Science degree in June 1917. Fox was not present for his graduation ceremony because he started his initial military training earlier that month.

While in college, Fox attended several United States Training Camps that were organized as part of the pre-World War I Preparedness Movement. In May 1917, his application for a commission was approved, and in June he began attendance at the Fort Riley, Kansas Citizens' Military Training Camp (CMTC). Assigned to the camp's Fourth Company, Fox completed the officer candidate course in August 1917 and received his commission as a second lieutenant of Infantry in the Organized Reserve Corps.

== Military career ==
=== World War I ===
After receiving his commission following U.S. entry into World War I, Fox was stationed at Camp Funston, Kansas as a member of the 164th Depot Brigade. He was promoted to temporary first lieutenant in December 1917 and temporary captain in August 1918.

=== Interwar years ===
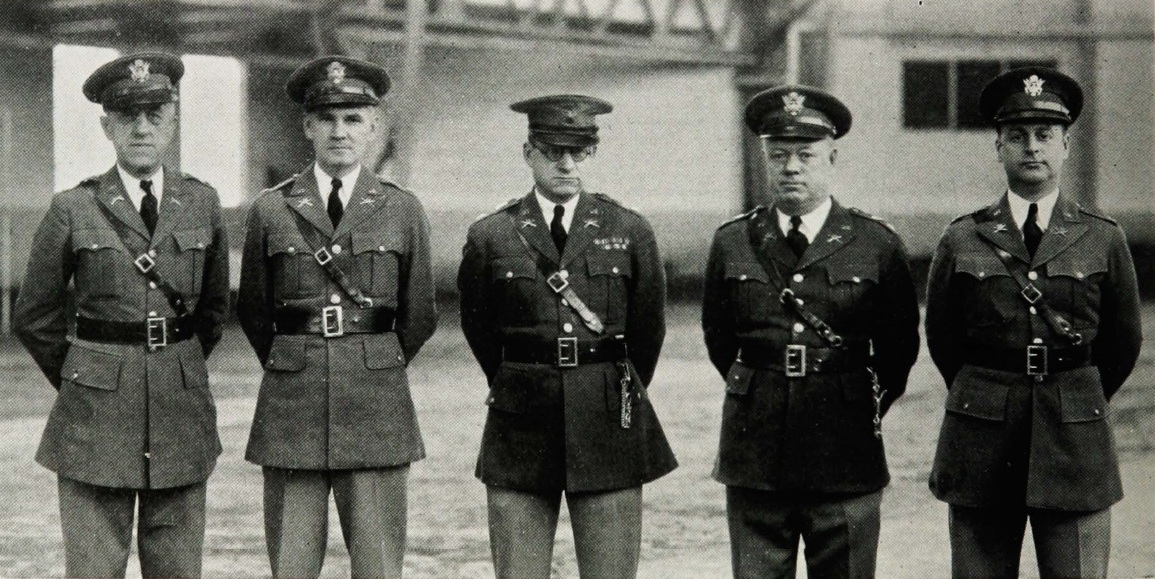
Alonzo Patrick Fox (second from the left) as an ROTC instructor at the University of Maine in the mid-1930s

Fox was discharged from the wartime National Army, effective April 1920, and was commissioned as a first lieutenant in the regular army, effective July 1, 1920. On July 2, he was promoted to captain in the regular army. In July 1921, he was assigned to the 46th Infantry Regiment, and later that month he was an instructor at the CMTC which took place at Fort Snelling, Minnesota. In December 1921, he was transferred to the 3rd Infantry Regiment.

In 1921 Fox graduated from the Infantry School Basic Course. Fox served in the Philippines from 1923 to 1924. After his return to the United States, he served as aide-de-camp to Major General Robert Lee Howze, commander of the Fifth Corps Area at Fort Knox, Kentucky. After this service, he was assigned to duty in the Washington, DC office of the chief of the Signal Corps. In 1927, he was assigned to the 25th Infantry Regiment and posted to Fort Huachuca, Arizona. Fox's next assignment was officer in charge of the Army Pictorial Service In Washington, DC, where he developed the plan for replacing silent film production and distribution with new film technology that included sound. In the 1920s, the army emphasized polo, with senior commanders believing that the game improved leadership traits in officers by training them to make quick decisions while under stress, and Fox played on several intramural teams.

In 1932, Fox graduated from the Infantry School Advanced Course, and he served as assistant deputy chief of staff for logistics (G-4) on the staff of the Hawaiian Department from 1932 to 1935. In the mid-1930s Fox served as an assistant professor of military science for the Army Reserve Officers' Training Corps program at the University of Maine at Orono. Fox graduated from the United States Army Command and General Staff College in 1938. From 1938 to 1942, Fox served as an instructor at the Fort Benning Infantry School.

== World War II ==
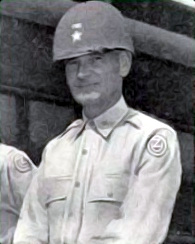
Fox with the 102nd Infantry Division during World War II

When the U.S. entered World War II, Fox was promoted to colonel and assigned as assistant chief of staff for operations (G-3) of X Corps during its organization and training in Sherman, Texas. In March 1943, he was promoted to brigadier general and succeeded Lloyd D. Brown as assistant division commander of the 102nd Infantry Division. In August, he led a contingent of the division's officers and noncommissioned officers from its Fort Dix training site to Omaha Beach in Normandy, where this advance party began to plan for reception of the organization's main body. After the division was reunited in France, Fox served during its campaigns in northern France, the Rhineland and Central Europe. He continued to serve as assistant division commander until June 1945, when he was succeeded by William S. Biddle.

== Post-World War II ==
From 1945 to 1946, Fox served as commander of the War Department Personnel Center at Fort Sam Houston, Texas, where he was responsible for the demobilization and discharge of soldiers returning from World War II.

In 1946, Fox was assigned to Supreme Command Allied Powers (SCAP) in Japan as director of the Office of Economic and Industrial Affairs. In 1947, he was assigned to the SCAP headquarters as deputy chief of staff. In March 1948, Fox made headlines when he provided committee testimony to the United States House of Representatives that assessed the Soviet Union's efforts to build a communist movement in Japan as ineffective, and predicted that Japan would soon be ready to transition to a republican form of government.

== Korean War ==
When the United Nations Command was formed during the Korean War, Fox was named one of its deputy chiefs of staff. Fox participated in the Inchon landing in September 1950 and received the Silver Star.

== Post Korean War ==
In 1951, Fox was named the Army's member of the Joint Strategic Survey Committee, a senior advisory group of the Joint Chiefs of Staff. Fox served as military advisor to the Assistant Secretary of Defense for International Security Affairs from 1955 to 1957. Fox retired from the Army in July 1957.

== Awards ==
Fox's decorations included multiple awards of the Distinguished Service Medal, the Silver Star, the Legion of Merit, and three Bronze Star Medals. His foreign decorations included the French Croix de Guerre with palms, Dutch Order of Orange-Nassau, and Soviet Order of the Red Banner.

== Post-military work ==
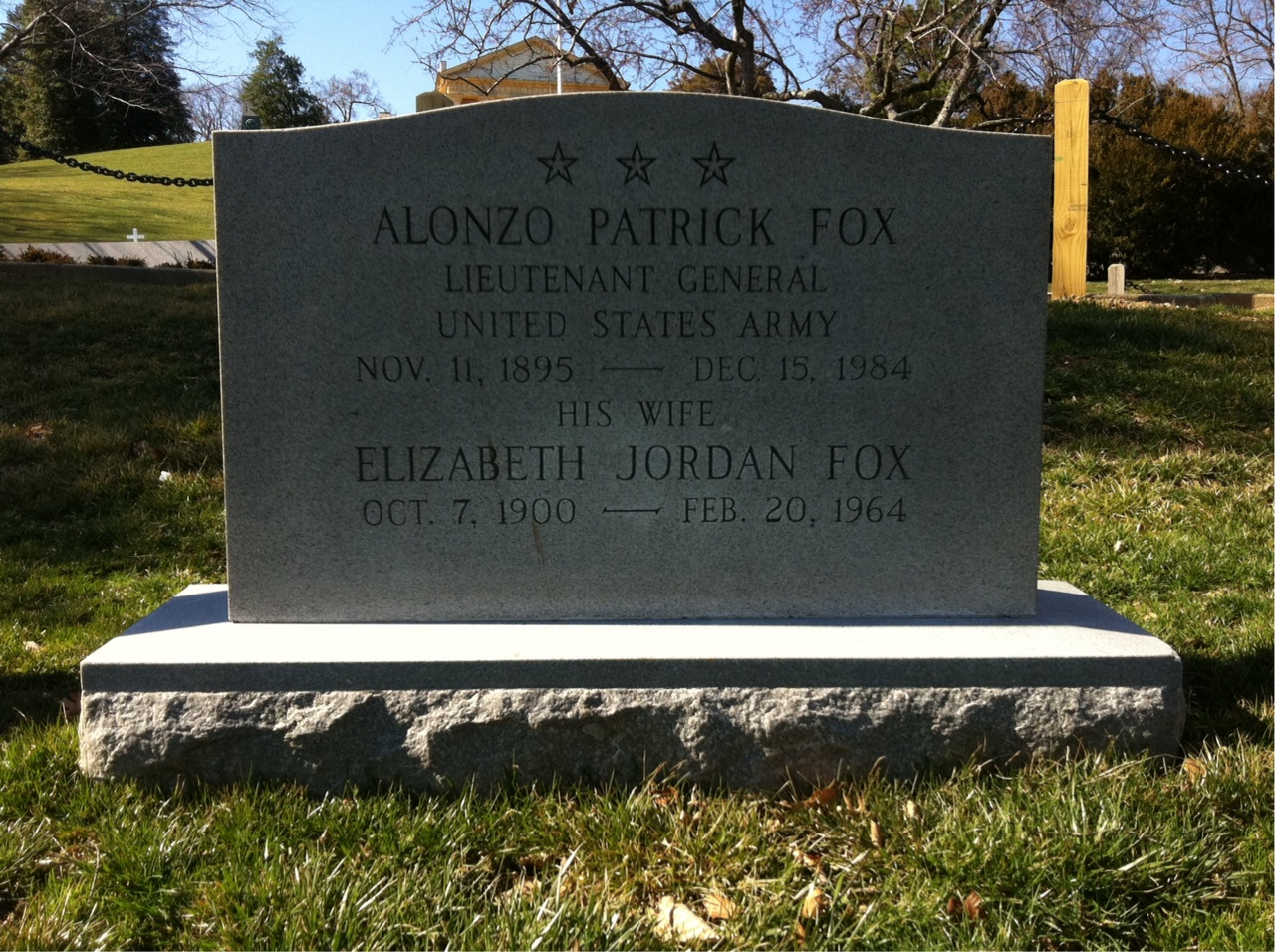
Fox's gravestone at Arlington National Cemetery

From 1957 to 1959, Fox served as Deputy Assistant Secretary of Defense for National Security Council Affairs. In retirement, Fox resided in McLean, Virginia.

== Death and burial ==
He died at Sibley Memorial Hospital in Washington, D.C., on 19 December 1984. He was buried at Arlington National Cemetery, Section 2, Site 4735-G RH.

== Personal life ==
Fox was married to Elizabeth Jordan (7 October 1900 – 20 February 1964). Their children included a son, Army Colonel Eugene A. Fox, and a daughter, Patricia Fox. Patricia Fox was the wife of Alexander M. Haig Jr.
