= World Business Review =

American television infomercial series

- Created by: MMP (USA) Inc
- Starring: Caspar Weinberger (1996–2000); Alexander Haig (2000–2006); Norman Schwarzkopf (2006–2007)
- Country of origin: United States
- No. of episodes: 700 (airs weekly)

Production
- Running time: 27 minutes

Original release
- Network: American Public Television
- Release: September 5, 1996 – 2007

World Business Review is an American television infomercial series, originally hosted by former Secretary of Defense Caspar W. Weinberger. The show typically features executives of mostly up and coming companies talking about their products and services. WBR purchases airtime in North America and is formatted as a panel discussion in combination with segments about specific companies and their solutions. Supporting material and commentary is provided by leading industry experts. The series has aired more than one thousand episodes and more than 4,000 interviews.

The company that produces World Business Review hires recognized names in politics, government and business to serve as hosts and interviewers. MMP (USA) also produces "21st Century Television with Donald Trump, Jr."

== History ==
World Business Review first aired Thursday evening September 5, 1996 on Philadelphia, PA's public television station WYBE.

== Hosts and production ==
- In September 1996, World Business Review introduced its first host, Caspar Weinberger. Weinberger hosted World Business Review between 1996 and 2000, from episodes #301 to #711A.
- Alexander M. Haig became the second host of the program. Haig hosted more than one thousand episodes during the taping period November 2000 to November 2006, from episodes #711B to at least #1818.
- In September 2006, World Business Review introduced its third host, Norman Schwarzkopf.
