= Frank A. Keating =

Recipient of the Legion of Merit

Frank Augustus Keating
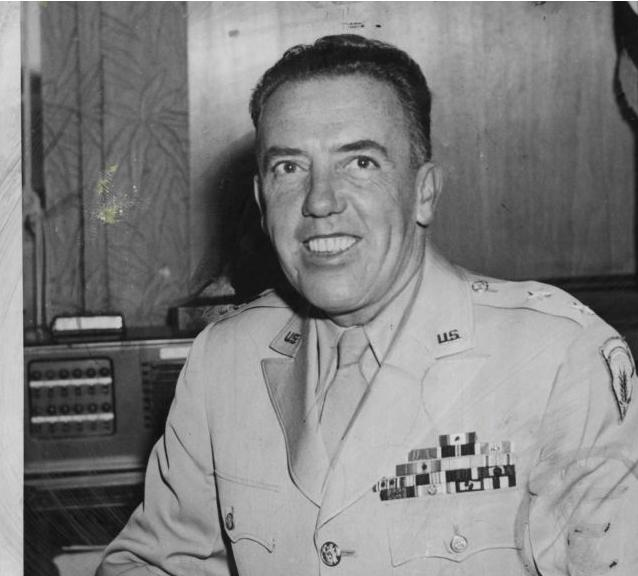
- Born: February 4, 1895; New York City, New York, United States
- Died: April 28, 1973 (aged 78); Cohasset, Massachusetts, United States
- Military career
- Allegiance: United States
- Branch: United States Army
- Service years: 1915–1950
- Rank: Major General
- Service number: 0-5360
- Unit: Infantry Branch
- Commands: 102nd Infantry Division
- Conflicts: Pancho Villa Expedition; World War I World War II; Korean War
- Awards: Army Distinguished Service Medal (2); Legion of Merit; Bronze Star

Major General Frank Augustus Keating (February 4, 1895 – April 28, 1973) was a career officer of the United States Army who commanded the 102nd Infantry Division during World War II, was Governor of the U.S. Zone of Germany, and was Chief U.S. Military Advisor to Korea.

== Early life and military career ==
He was born in New York City and entered military service on May 18, 1915. He served in combat in France from 1917 to 1918 during World War I and then became an instructor at the Infantry Weapons School in Chatillion-Sur-Seine, France.

== Between the wars ==
From 1921 to 1922 he was a student in the Company Officers’ Course at Fort Benning, Georgia, and shortly thereafter served in Japan, the Philippines and Hawaii. In 1939 he graduated from the U.S. Army Command and General Staff School at Fort Leavenworth, Kansas and was assigned to the 15th Infantry Regiment at Camp Lewis, Washington where he served with Major Mark W. Clark and Lieutenant Colonel Dwight D. Eisenhower.

== World War II ==
In May 1942, during World War II, he became commander of the Amphibious Training Center at Camp Edwards, Massachusetts. In January 1944 he assumed command of the 102nd Infantry Division.

== Postwar ==
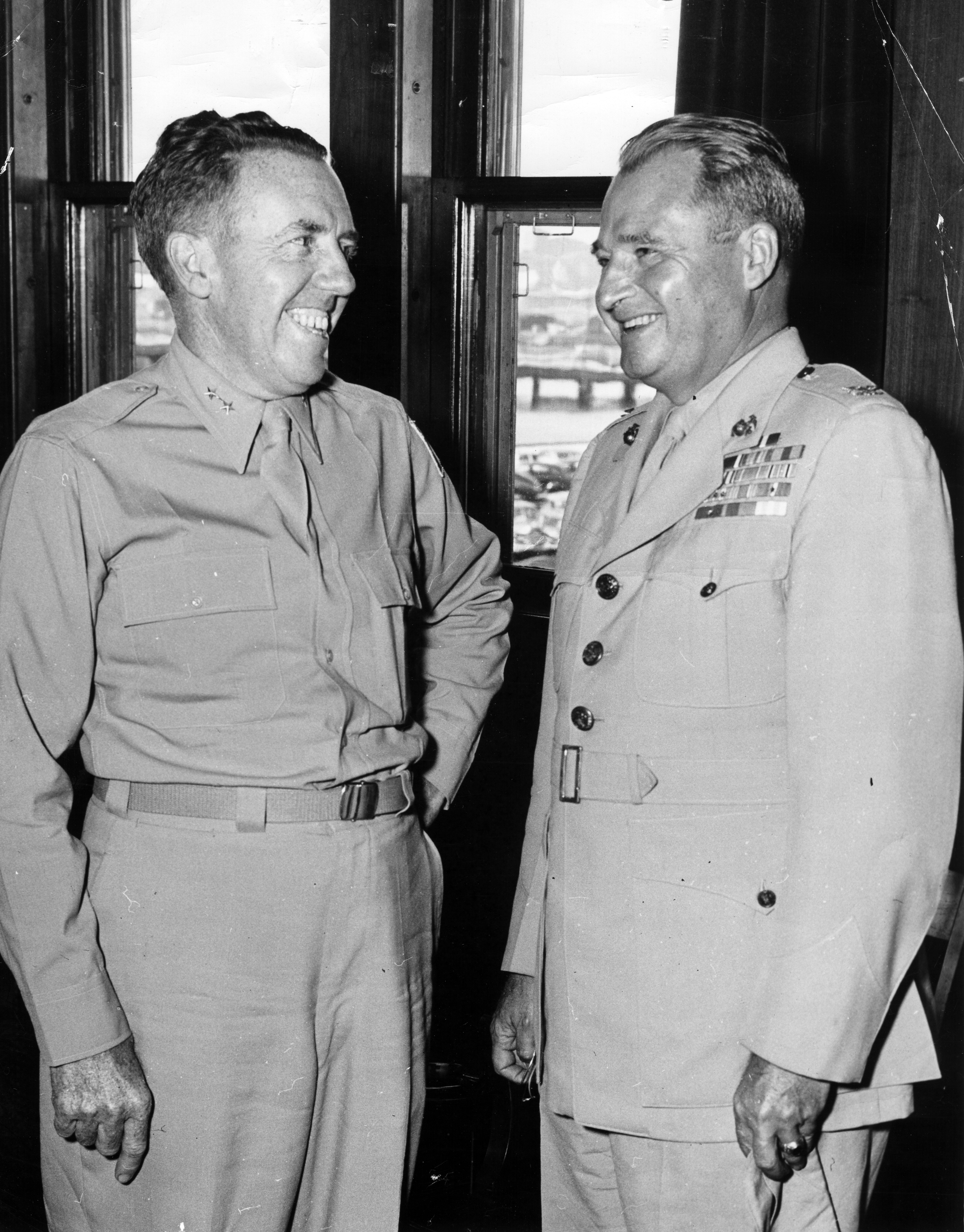
George J. O'Shea being welcomed by Major General Frank A. Keating (left), Commanding general, New England Military District in September 1949.

He served as Military Governor of Germany from May 1945 to January 1946 when he was assigned as Commander of Troops in Berlin, Deputy Military Governor of the U.S. Zone of Germany and Deputy to General Lucius D. Clay of the Allied Control Council. In 1950 he was appointed Chief U.S. Military Advisor to Korea and retired on August 31, 1950.

== Decorations ==
Major General Keating's decorations include: Distinguished Service Medal with Oak Leaf Cluster, Legion of Merit, Bronze Star Medal, Army Commendation Medal with Oak Leaf Cluster, Mexican Border Service Medal, World War I Victory Medal, Grand Officer of the Order of the White Lion, American Defense Service Medal, American Campaign Medal, World War II Victory Medal, Army of Occupation Medal, National Defense Service Medal, Korean Service Medal, United Nations Korea Medal, Croix de guerre 1939–1945 with Palm, Commander of the Legion of Honour and the Order of the Red Banner.

Military offices
Preceded by John B. Anderson	Commanding General 102nd Infantry Division; 1944–1945	Succeeded by Charles M. Busbee
