= Shadow (Woodward book) =

1999 book by Bob Woodward

Shadow: Five Presidents and the Legacy of Watergate
- Cover of Shadow by Bob Woodward
- Author: Bob Woodward
- Language: English
- Subject: Political science, United States, Watergate
- Publisher: Simon & Schuster
- Publication date: 1999
- Publication place: United States
- Pages: 608
- ISBN: 0-684-85262-4

Shadow: Five Presidents and the Legacy of Watergate is a 1999 book by Washington Post journalist Bob Woodward, written with a narrative voice while utilizing firsthand interviews and news reports for its historical basis. For the 608-page book, Woodward used extensive notes and also interviewed President Ford, President Bush's chief of staff, James Baker, and other people of focus.

Its five sections cover:

- Gerald Ford - The pardoning of Richard Nixon
- Jimmy Carter - The scandals involving administrative officials Bert Lance and Hamilton Jordan
- Ronald Reagan - The Iran–Contra affair
- George H. W. Bush - The decisions behind the first Gulf War, "Passportgate" and the resignation of Naval Secretary H. Lawrence Garrett
- Bill Clinton - Whitewater controversy, Monica Lewinsky, Paula Jones and Clinton's impeachment trial

The book's final 300 pages cover Bill Clinton's administration. Nearly 100 pages are devoted to Reagan's administration. The book largely delves into the personal discussions that each president had during each issue, with no holds barred regarding profanity. Shadow was written with the research help of Jeff Glasser.
