= Gerd Schmückle =

German general and author

- Born: 1 December 1917; Stuttgart-Cannstatt, Kingdom of Württemberg, German Empire
- Died: 28 May 2013 (aged 95); Munich, Germany
- Military career
- Allegiance: Nazi Germany (to 1945); West Germany (to 1980)
- Branch: German Army; West Germany
- Service years: 1936–45; 1956–80
- Rank: General
- Units: 7th Panzer Division; 12th Panzer Division; I. Corps
- Conflicts: World War II: Fall of France; Eastern Front

Gerd Schmückle (1 December 1917 – 28 May 2013) was a German four-star general. Schmückle served in the 7th Panzer Division under Erwin Rommel during the Fall of France. With this division he later fought in the Soviet Union where he was wounded six times. In early 1944, he was promoted to the German General Staff, major and artillery battalion commander. After the surrender of the Wehrmacht in 1945 he operated a farm in Bavaria and worked as a journalist. In 1956, he joined the Bundeswehr where he was promoted to general in 1978.

From 1978 to 1980 he was Deputy Supreme Allied Commander Europe, the first German to hold the post.

== Journalistic works ==
- Kommiß a. D. Kritische Gänge durch die Kasernen. Seewald, Stuttgart 1971 (2., überarbeitete Auflage. ebenda 1972, ISBN 3-512-00232-3).
- Ohne Pauken und Trompeten. Erinnerungen an Krieg und Frieden. Deutsche Verlags-Anstalt, Stuttgart 1982, ISBN 3-421-06109-2.
- Das Schwert am seidenen Faden. Krisenmanagement in Europa. Deutsche Verlags-Anstalt, Stuttgart 1984, ISBN 3-421-06185-8.
