= Brian Haig =

American author and military anayst

- Born: Brian Fox Haig; March 15, 1953 (age 73)
- Education: United States Military Academy (BS); Harvard University (MPA); Georgetown University (MA)
- Occupations: Thriller author; Fox News military analyst
- Political party: Republican
- Father: Alexander Haig

Brian Fox Haig (born March 15, 1953) is an American thriller author and Fox News military analyst.

== Early life and education ==
Haig's father was former U.S. Secretary of State Alexander Haig; his mother is Patricia (née Fox). He has a brother, Alexander, and a sister, Barbara.

He has a Bachelor of Science from the United States Military Academy, a master's in public administration from Harvard, and a master's in government from Georgetown University.

== Military career ==
Haig graduated from West Point in 1975 and was commissioned an infantry lieutenant. He served as a platoon leader and company executive officer in Germany, three years as an infantry company commander at Fort Carson, Colorado, before he was selected as an intern at the Organization of the Joint Chiefs of Staff, where he worked in the Current Operations Directorate on the Lebanon peacekeeping operation. After graduating from Harvard with a master's degree and a specialty in military strategy, he worked for three years as a global strategist on the Army staff, where he was responsible for helping formulate the regional war plan for Southwest Asia and the global war plans against the Soviet Union. He spent three years as the Special Assistant to the Commander-in-Chief of the United Nations Command and Combined Forces Command in Seoul. Haig ended his military career as the special assistant to the Chairman of the Joint Chiefs of Staff – John M. Shalikashvili, where his duties lay with the preparation of all speeches, briefings, public statements, and congressional testimonies. He retired from active duty as a lieutenant colonel in 1997.

His military awards include Airborne wings and the Ranger tab, two Legions of Merit, and the Distinguished Service Medal.

== After the military ==
Haig retired into civilian life in 1997 to become a director and later president of Erickson Air-Crane and then spent a year as president of International Business Communications. He has written articles for The New York Times, USA Today and Vanity Fair. He is now a full-time author, and works as a Fox News military contributor.

== Published works ==
- Secret Sanction, Warner Books (2001), ISBN 0-446-52743-2
- Mortal Allies, Warner Books (2002), ISBN 0-446-53026-3
- The Kingmaker, Warner Books (2003), ISBN 0-446-53055-7
- Private Sector, Warner Books (2004), ISBN 0-446-53178-2
- The President's Assassin, Warner Books (2005), ISBN 0-446-57667-0
- Man In The Middle, Warner Books (2007), ISBN 0-446-53056-5
- The Night Crew, Thomas & Mercer (2015), ISBN 1-477-82748-X
- The Hunted, Grand Central Publishing (2009), ISBN 0-446-19559-6
- The Capitol Game, Grand Central Publishing (2010), ISBN 0-446-19561-8
