= UN offensive into North Korea =

1950 military campaign during the Korean War

- Part of the Korean War
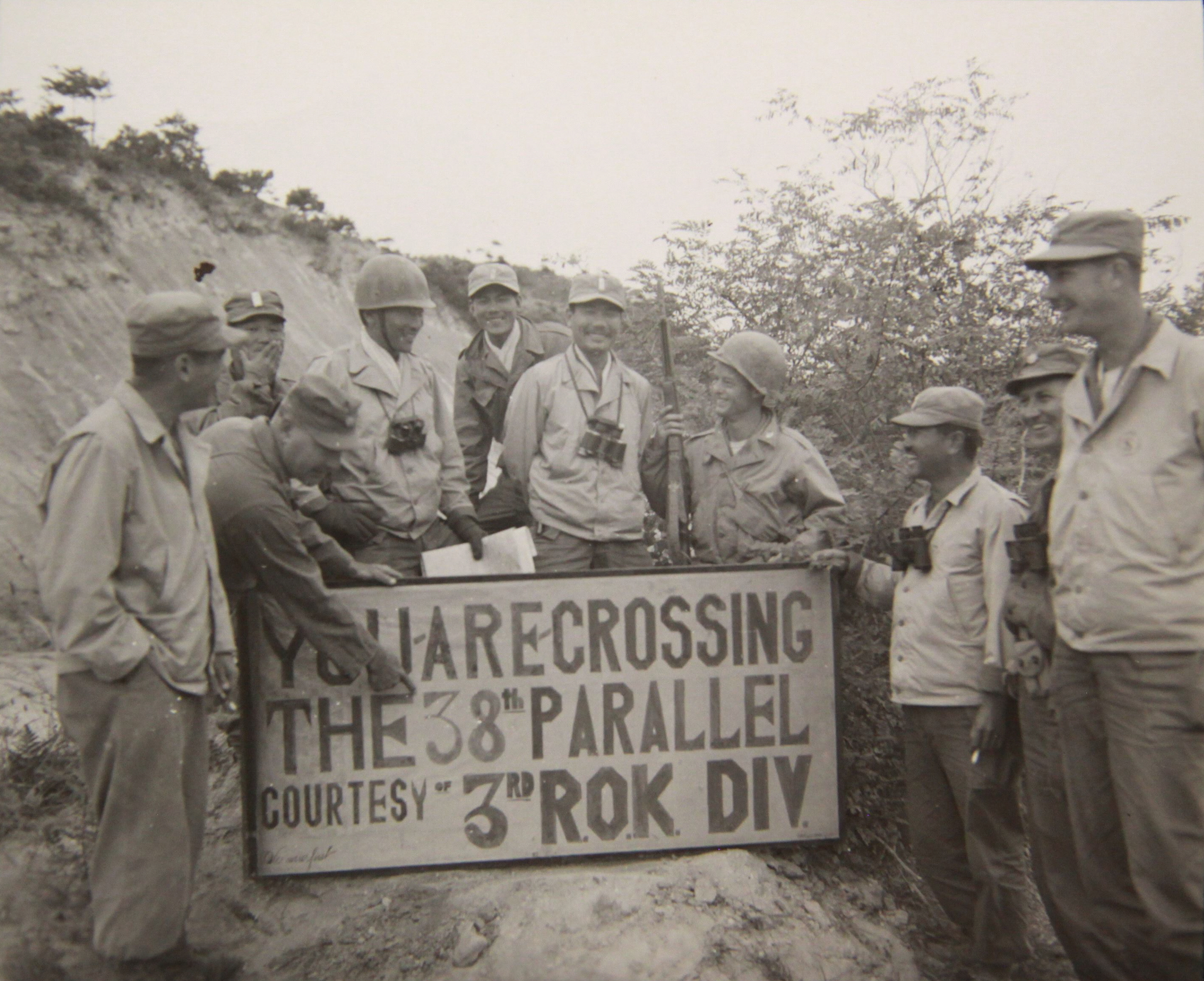
- 3rd Division Republic of Korea Army troops with sign at the 38th Parallel
Date	30 September – 25 November 1950 (1 month, 3 weeks and 5 days)
Location	North Korea
Result	United Nations victory: Chinese intervention

Belligerents
United Nations: United States; United Kingdom; South Korea	North Korea; China

Commanders and leaders
Douglas MacArthur; Walton Walker; Frank W. Milburn; John B. Coulter; Edward Almond; Earle E. Partridge (First Republic of Korea) Chung Il-Kwon (First Republic of Korea) Shin Sung-Mo	(North Korea) Choi Yong-kun (North Korea) Kim Chaek † (North Korea) Kim Ung (North Korea) Kim Mu Chong (China) Peng Dehuai

Units involved
(United States) Eighth Army: I Corps; 1st Cavalry Division; 24th Infantry Division; (First Republic of Korea) 1st Infantry Division; (United Kingdom) 27th Commonwealth Brigade; (United States) IX Corps; 2nd Infantry Division; 25th Infantry Division; (First Republic of Korea) Republic of Korea Army: I Corps; 3rd Infantry Division; Capital Division; II Corps; 6th Infantry Division; 7th Infantry Division; 8th Infantry Division; (United States) Fifth Air Force (United States) X Corps: 1st Marine Division; 3rd Infantry Division; 7th Infantry Division; 1st Marine Air Wing	(North Korea) Korean People's Army: 1st Division; 2nd Division; 3rd Division; 4th Division; 6th Division; 7th Division; 8th Division; 13th Division; 15th Division; 19th Division; 27th Division; 41st Division; 43rd Division; 17th Armored Division; 105th Armored Division; (China) People's Volunteer Army: 38th Army; 112th Division; 113th Division; 114th Division; 39th Army; 115th Division; 116th Division; 117th Division; 40th Army; 118th Division; 119th Division; 120th Division; 42nd Army; 124th Division; 125th Division; 126th Division

Strength
423,000	(North Korea) ~97,000 (China) ~300,000

Casualties and losses
(United States) 1,732 killed	Unknown

The UN offensive into North Korea was a large-scale offensive in late 1950 by United Nations (UN) forces against North Korean forces during the Korean War.

On 27 September near Osan, UN forces coming from Inchon linked up with UN forces that had broken out of the Pusan Perimeter and began a general counteroffensive. The North Korean Korean People's Army (KPA) had been shattered, and its remnants were fleeing back towards North Korea. The UN Command then decided to pursue the KPA into North Korea, completing their destruction and unifying the country. On 30 September Republic of Korea Army (ROKA) forces crossed the 38th parallel, the de facto border between North and South Korea on the east coast of the Korean peninsula, and this was followed by a general UN offensive into North Korea. Within one month UN forces were approaching the Yalu River, prompting Chinese intervention in the war. Despite the initial Chinese attacks in late October – early November, the UN renewed their offensive on 24 November before it was abruptly halted by massive Chinese intervention in their Second Phase Offensive starting on 25 November.

== Background ==
=== North Korea repelled ===
North Korea invaded South Korea at the end of June 1950 in Operation Pokpung. By late-July, South Korea was reduced to the southeast tip of the peninsula around Pusan, held by the United Nations Command (UNC) forces, mainly the US Eighth Army, and the ROKA. The Korean People's Army (KPA) offensive on the Pusan perimeter in August and September failed to break through; the KPA had suffered heavy casualties since the start of the war and was overextended. By September, the KPA was attacking Pusan with 70,000 troops, while the UNC had 140,000 troops with materiel superiority. The US estimated that there were 90,000 KPA troops in South Korea. In mid-September, US X Corps, composed of US 1st Marine Division and US 7th Infantry Division, made a surprise landing at Inchon in the North Korean rear west of Seoul; UNC commander General Douglas MacArthur accompanied the landing. Shortly afterward, the UNC and ROKA broke out of Pusan. The KPA began a general retreat from South Korea to avoid encirclement, giving little resistance to their rapidly advancing pursuers from Pusan. Eighth Army advanced in the west and linked up with X Corps at Osan on 26 September. The ROKA advanced in the east and reached the 38th parallel by the end of the month.

=== Deciding to invade North Korea ===
MacArthur intended to invade North Korea even though he did not have the authority to do so. The pause in operations was for logistical purposes. However, on 27 September he received authorization to proceed from the US Joint Chiefs of Staff (JCS). The JCS directed MacArthur to pursue and destroy North Korean forces up to the Chinese and Soviet borders; employment of UN forces in the border areas was to be avoided as a "matter of policy". Air and naval operations on Chinese or Soviet territory were forbidden. Furthermore, as a precondition, no advance beyond the 38th parallel was permitted if a major China or Soviet military intervention had occurred or was likely to. A further message on 29 September explicitly informed MacArthur that an invasion was authorized by the US government.

The UNC had fulfilled United Nations Security Council (UNSC) Resolution 82 by repelling the North Korean invasion. Now, a military reunification of Korea seemed possible, but Soviet opposition prevented UNSC Resolution 83, concerning the restoration of "international peace and security in the area", from being used as justification. The United States and the United Kingdom sought broad support for military reunification by submitting Resolution 376(V) to the UN General Assembly on 29 September; this circumvented the Soviet veto in the UNSC. The resolution was adopted on 7 October, giving the UNC invasion of North Korea an official UN mandate just as it began.

=== Chinese intentions ===
The US believed Chinese and Soviet intervention to be unlikely; the expected intervention following the reversal in mid-September had not occurred. Intelligence from diplomats in China — including K. M. Panikkar, the ambassador of India to China — suggested that China was too preoccupied with internal affairs and gaining UN membership to intervene; it was not until 27 September that the US started receiving intelligence from these sources to the contrary. At the end of the month, India refused to cosponsor Resolution 376(V) and an UNC offensive into North Korea on the grounds that it would cause Chinese intervention.

China was asked by the Soviet Union to intervene after the Inchon landing, and North Korea repeated the request on 1 October; on 2 October, China — with strong support from Mao Zedong and Peng Dehuai — agreed to intervene on the condition that the Soviet Union provided materiel aid. The inability of Western intelligence to determine Chinese intentions earlier was caused by the late decision and the resulting lack of strong warning signals until late-September.

== United Nations preparations ==
=== Planning ===
MacArthur received the first outline for the attack plan from US Far East Command (FEC) on 26 September. In the plan, Eighth Army advanced northward on the west flank from Seoul, and X Corps advanced westward after landing at Wonsan on the east coast. X Corps move west would block the KPA retreating from South Korea, and complete the encirclement and capture of Pyongyang with Eighth Army. In the outline, the Wonsan landing occurred 12 days after Eighth Army passed through X Corps in the Seoul-Inchon area, and three to seven days after the start of Eighth Army attack. MacArthur approved this plan on 29 September.

Wonsan was the principal port and a major transportation hub on Korea's east coast. It was a North Korean naval base, and Soviet materiel shipped by sea from Vladivostok arrived through it. Korean petroleum refining was centered there and the important industrial Hamhung-Hungnam area was 80 kilometres (50 mi) to the north. A railroad went northeast to Vladivostok, and a railroad and the "only reasonably good" lateral road went west toward Pyongyang slightly north of the 39th parallel.

Separating Eighth Army and X Corps into different field commands and geographically was controversial. General Walton Walker, commander of Eighth Army, and General Doyle O. Hickey, FEC's Deputy Chief of Staff, supported subordinating X Corps to Eighth Army, and starting the offensive two weeks earlier by having X Corps lead Eighth Army northward; the ROKA had met little resistance on the east flank from Pusan and its overland advance would likely reach Wonsan before an amphibious assault by X Corps. Admiral C. Turner Joy, commander of US Naval Forces Far East, believed X Corps could capture Wonsan faster by advancing overland from Seoul. X Corps leading the way and doing most of the fighting until Pyongyang would limit supply consumption on the west flank. The east flank could be supplied by sea after capturing the ports of Wonsan and Hungnam. The alternate plan was developed by Eighth Army staff but never proposed. General O.P. Smith, commander of 1st Marine Division, was also skeptical of using his division in northeast Korea.

MacArthur's decision to split the formations may have been due to logistical or leadership concerns. Korean transportation infrastructure was heavily damaged by the war and, combined with most principal routes being in the north–south direction due to the mountainous terrain, he may have believed supplying a quick advance by both Eighth Army and X Corps from Inchon to be impossible. MacArthur may also have lacked confidence in Walker's ability to control so large a force. Coordinating the two formations may not have appeared to be a serious problem, as the base of operations for Korea was in Japan.

=== X Corps' preparations ===
Joint Task Force 7 was reestablished, with Admiral Arthur Dewey Struble in command, to transport X Corps and provide the corps with naval support for and after the landing. General Edward Almond, commander of X Corps, and Struble received preliminary instructions from FEC on 1 October. MacArthur formalized the attack on 2 October in United Nations Operation Order 2. The port at Inchon was congested by adverse tidal conditions, the quantity of amphibious craft available, and its concurrent use by Eighth Army. MacArthur decided to load part of the force at Pusan to meet the two week schedule. 1st Marine Division, the amphibious assault element of X Corps, had priority for loading at Inchon. X Corps headquarters would also load at Inchon, while the US 7th Infantry Division and most of X Corps moved to Pusan for loading. During the attack, 1st Marine Division would secure the corps' bridgehead, with 7th Infantry Division advancing west and linking up with Eighth Army at Pyongyang.

1st Marine Division was informed of the planned landing at Wonsan on 30 September. On 1 October, it was ordered to submit plans by 3 October for a 15 October landing; this was impossible as ships had yet to be allocated. On 7 October, Admiral Doyle, commander of the Attack Force, recommended a landing date of no earlier than 20 October; the amphibious assault forces could meet no earlier. MacArthur tentatively accepted the new date on the condition that every effort was made to meet 15 October. Joint Task Force 7's operation plan and organization was published on 9 October.

UN Operations Plan 2 was put into effect on 10 October.

==== 1st Marine Division embarkation at Inchon ====
On 3 October, X Corps ordered 1st Marine Division to assemble at Inchon, which was mostly completed by 6 October. The division had 28,147 men, including attachments of 40 US Army troops and 4,516 Korean Marines.

Loading was made more difficult by 9.4-metre (31 ft) tides, mud banks at low tide, and limited port facilities. The staging area was inadequate. Only seven Landing Ship, Tank (LSTs) or landing craft could beach at a time, and only at high tide. There was only one small pier to load vehicles onto Landing Craft Mechanized, again only at high tide. Vehicles were ferried to attack transports and amphibious cargo ships on LSTs, and the vehicles moved by cranes from the top decks of the landing craft to the ships. Bulk cargo was ferried out from the tidal basin. X Corps requested that the port halt any daytime unloading that was unrelated to the corps, otherwise loading would be delayed for an estimated six to twenty days. The 1st Marine Division was informed that 10 days of supplies would be bottom loaded, but this was not done and resulted in ships being reloaded. In reloading, X Corps drew considerably from supply dumps that could have been left for Eighth Army. Additional rations were flown in from Japan via Kimpo Airfield. Troops began embarking on 9 October. X Corps headquarters relocated to USS Mount McKinley on 11 October. Bulk cargo loading began on 8 October and continued until 16 October when all X Corps loading at Inchon was completed.

Amphibious Group One and the LSTs left Inchon late in the afternoon of 16 October. The main body of the Attack Force, carrying 1st Marine Division, left Inchon on the morning of 17 October. After arriving off of Wonsan, the flotilla steamed slowly back and forth from 19 to 25 October in the Sea of Japan just outside the Wonsan channel; the restless Marines called it "Operation Yo-yo".

==== 7th Infantry Division embarkation at Pusan ====
On 30 September, 7th Infantry Division began assembling in the area of Suwon and Ich'on for movement to Pusan. Its tanks and heavy equipment were loaded onto LSTs at Inchon. On 4 October, Eighth Army, designated a 560 km (350 mi) road route through Ch'ungju, Hamch'ang, Kumch'on, Taegu and Kyongju to Pusan; troops would transfer from trucks to trains at Taegu. The division moved from 5 to 12 October; the artillery was the last major unit to leave Inchon on 10 October. They were accompanied by X Corps Medical, Engineer, Ordnance, Transportation, Quartermaster, Chemical, and Signal units. About 450 division troops were airlifted on 11 October from Kimpo Airfield to Pusan. In total, divisional vehicles and the 52nd Truck Battalion moved 13,422 troops and approximately 1,460 tons of materiel.

Convoys were ambushed twice by the KPA in the mountains near Mun'gyong. The ambush on 6 October caused nine casualties. The division headquarters was attacked on 9 October in the pass 5 km (3 mi) northwest of Mun'gyong; the North Koreans killed six men and destroyed several vehicles.

At Pusan, the division started loading vehicles and equipment on 14 October, and troops on 16 October; loading was completed on 17 October as scheduled.The division's advance command post opened aboard USS Eldorado on 16 October. X Corps troops began loading on 19 October.

X Corps requested significant supplies on 8 October. Fifteen days' supply for forces loading at Pusan depleted local depots and later caused difficulties for Eighth Army. Ten days were requested for forces loading at Inchon. Another 15 days to resupply the entire corps at Wonsan on D-day plus 8 (28 October) was drawn mainly from Japan Logistical Command. The supplies were loaded on time in "an outstanding performance", but delivery was ultimately delayed by minefields in Wonsan Harbor.

=== Eighth Army deployment ===
Based on MacArthur's UN Command Operations Order 2, dated 2 October, Eighth Army on 3 October issued an operations order to implement its part in the plan for the attack into North Korea. The army order called for US I Corps to seize a line west of the Imjin River with not less than a division, and to concentrate the Corps in an assembly area there as rapidly as IX Corps could relieve it. I Corps was then to conduct operations northward on army orders, making the main effort with the 1st Cavalry Division leading the attack. The 24th Infantry Division and the ROKA 1st Infantry Division were to protect the Corps' flanks and form a reserve. In addition to relieving the I Corps in its zone, IX Corps was to protect the line of communications, Seoul-Suwon-Taejon-Taegu-Pusan and, together with Korean National Police, destroy the remaining KPA forces in South Korea. The ROKA was directed to move its II Corps, consisting of the 6th, 7th, and 8th Infantry Divisions, to the area between Ch'unch'on and Uijongbu in central Korea and its I Corps, composed of the Capital and 3rd Infantry Divisions, to the area between Yongp'o and Chumunjin-up on the east coast, all prepared to attack northward. The ROKA was also to provide a new division (the 11th) by 5 October to help IX Corps in the rear areas of South Korea.

Pursuant to orders, on 5 October the 1st Cavalry Division advanced north of Seoul for the purpose of securing the I Corps' assembly area near the 38th Parallel. Led by I Company, the 5th Cavalry Regiment in the evening crossed to the north side of the Imjin River at Munsan-ni. At noon on the 7th, the 16th Reconnaissance Company entered Kaesong, and that evening elements of the 1st Battalion, 8th Cavalry Regiment, arrived there. By the evening of 8 October the 7th and 8th Cavalry Regiments of the 1st Cavalry Division had secured the I Corps assembly area in the vicinity of Kaesong. Some of the troops were within small arms range of the 38th Parallel. Behind the 1st Cavalry Division, the 24th Infantry Division concentrated in the Seoul area. At this point a new military organization appeared in Korea, and it also concentrated near Seoul. The 3rd Battalion, Royal Australian Regiment, commanded by Lieutenant colonel Charles H. Green, arrived at Pusan on 28 September. It joined the British 27th Brigade at Kumch'on on 3 October, which was then renamed the 27th British Commonwealth Brigade. Two days later the bulk of the brigade moved by air to Kimpo Airfield as part of the I Corps concentration near the 38th Parallel. With its I Corps concentrated to the north of Seoul, Eighth Army took over control of the Inchon-Seoul area from X Corps at 12:00, 7 October. The command posts of both Eighth Army and the ROKA moved from Taegu and opened in Seoul on 12 October.

Earlier, on 4 October, the Far East Air Forces (FEAF) and the Fifth Air Force, acting on a directive of 8 July, had assumed control of the Marine squadrons at Kimpo. This was highly displeasing to X Corps, and particularly so to the Marines. But the change in control actually made little difference in air operations since FEAF directed that the 1st Marine Air Wing continue to support X Corps. The Fifth Air Force headquarters moved to Seoul on 15 October. As a result of the September victories, the Japan-based fighters and fighter-bombers of the Fifth Air Force moved to Korean bases. This permitted an increase in their armament load, more time over target and combat area, and lengthened flight ranges into North Korea.

MacArthur demanded North Korea's surrender on 1 October, and received no reply. The demand was made again "for the last time" on 9 October, again without an official response. The demand was rejected by Kim Il Sung in a radio broadcast from Pyongyang on the morning of 10 October; the broadcast was monitored in Tokyo.

== Offensive ==
=== ROKA I Corps captures Wonsan and Hungnam (30 September – 17 October) ===
Regardless of whether the UN forces did or did not cross the 38th Parallel, there was always the strong probability that the ROKA troops would. Syngman Rhee had often stated his intention of halting the ROKA only at the Yalu. Speaking at a mass meeting at Pusan on 19 September he said, "We have to advance as far as the Manchurian border until not a single enemy soldier is left in our country." He said that he did not expect the UN forces to stop at the 38th Parallel, but if they did, he continued, "we will not allow ourselves to stop". A message dropped by a Korean Military Advisory Group (KMAG) G-3 officer from a light plane at Samch'ok and delivered to Colonel Emmerich at Kangnung on the afternoon of 29 September ordered the ROKA 3rd Division to cross the 38th Parallel and proceed to Wonsan as soon as possible. Advanced patrols of the 3rd Division crossed the parallel on 30 September. The next day just before noon two rifle companies crossed the border and came under fire from KPA troops in old fixed positions north of the Parallel. On 2 October the ROKA 3rd and Capital Divisions established their command posts in Yangyang, 13 kilometres (8 mi) north of the parallel. Although MacArthur made the first official public announcement of forces under UN command crossing the 38th Parallel on 3 October, the American press had reported the incident the day before. Anticipating that ROKA forces would cross the Parallel, newspaper correspondents flew to Kangnung, just south of the border on the east coast, to get the news. Now began a remarkable phase of the pursuit. The ROKA 3rd Division traveled northward night and day, on foot and by vehicle, out of communication most of the time with higher headquarters, without flank protection to the west, and bypassing many KPA groups which often attacked their supply points in the rear. There were some costly firefights on the road north. The KPA 5th Division with about 2,400 survivors, retreating as best it could ahead of the ROKA, kept the pursuing advanced elements under mortar and 76 mm. antitank fire. The road was heavily mined and lead vehicles had many casualties. From fortified positions, including connecting trenches, caves, and dug-in gun positions, the KPA tried to stop or slow the ROKA advance, however the 3rd Division averaged about 24 kilometres (15 mi) a day.

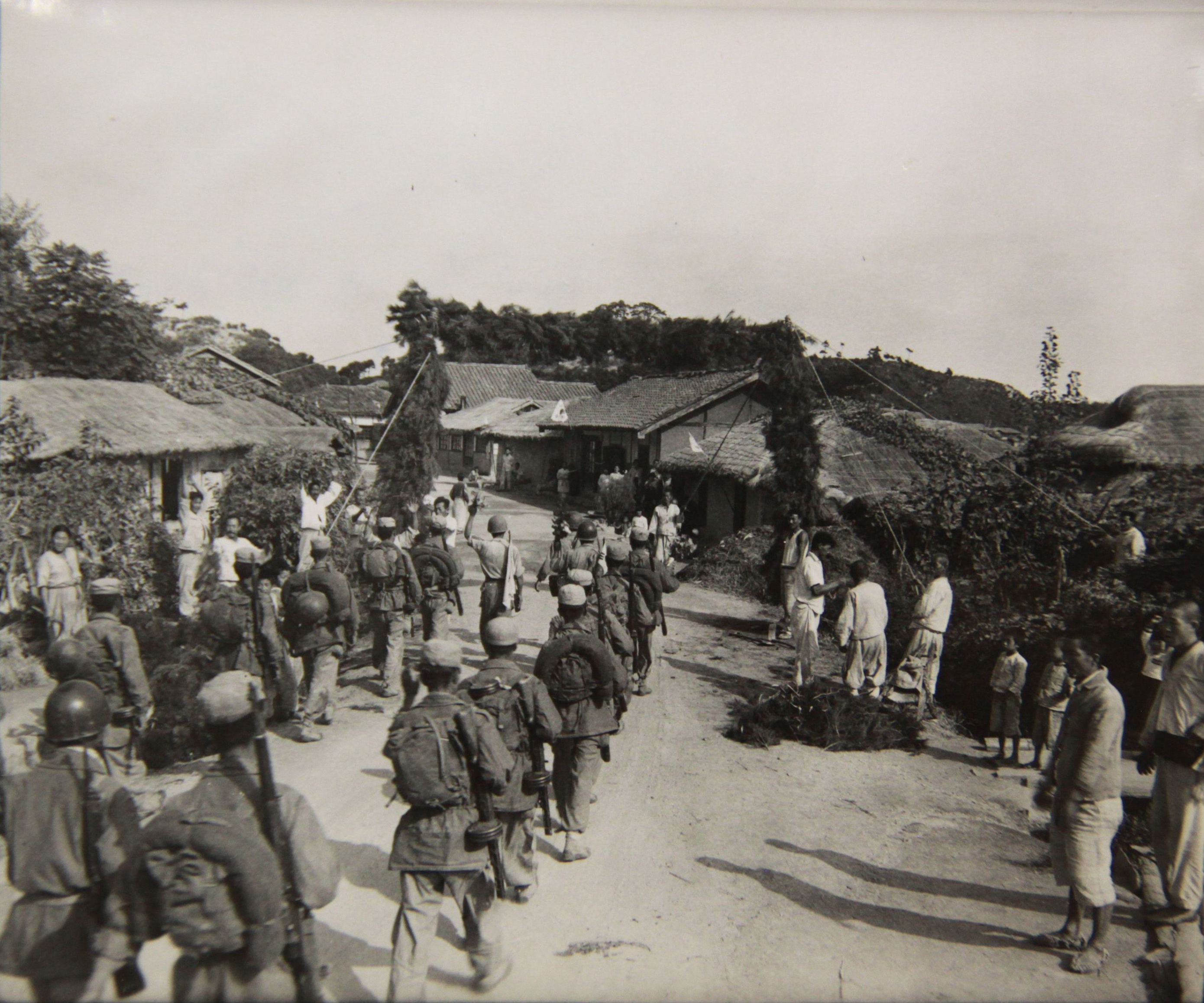
ROK 23rd Regiment, 3rd Division troops advance through Kosong

The Capital Division followed the 3rd, and at intervals sent some of its units inland into the Diamond Mountains, the lofty Kumgang-san, which crowded close upon the coastline. In central Korea, troops of the ROKA II Corps crossed into North Korea later than did the troops of the I Corps on the coast. On 6 October the ROKA 6th Division crossed the parallel from the vicinity of Ch'unch'on and advanced on Hwach'on. For three days it fought two regiments of the KPA 9th Division which stubbornly defended that town. Late on the afternoon of 8 October, the division entered Hwach'on, driving two KPA battalions northwest. The 8th Division crossed the 38th Parallel on 7 October. On its right, the 7th Division crossed a day or two later. Both divisions headed for the Iron Triangle. ROKA troops arrived at the Iron Triangle on 10 October. There in the Ch'orwon area a large force of KPA attacked the ROKA 16th Regiment during the day but was repulsed and forced to withdraw. Elements of the 8th Division then entered Ch'orwon.

The Iron Triangle was an area of relatively flat terrain, shaped like an equilateral triangle, in the mountains of east central North Korea. It is situated 30–50 km (20–30 mi) above the 38th Parallel, halfway across the peninsula, and 80 km (50 mi) northeast of Seoul. It is bounded at its three corners by the towns of Ch'orwon at its western base, Kumhwa-eup at its eastern base, and P'yonggang at its northern apex. The area was an important North Korean rail and road communication center, linking east and west coastal areas with each other, and in turn connecting them with the communication net leading south through central South Korea. On 11 October the ROKA 8th Division and the 7th Regiment of the 6th Division converged on P'yonggang. On 13 October the 7th Division arrived there by way of Kumhwa. All the ROKA divisions, except the 1st, which was part of the US I Corps and accordingly under direct US command, were across the 38th Parallel before any of the American divisions crossed.

On 9 October, the ROKA 3rd and Capital Divisions were at the south edge of Wonsan, 180 km (110 mi) up the coast above the 38th Parallel. That day the Capital Division on the Wonsan-Iron Triangle road south of the city captured six tanks, four artillery pieces, ten 82 mm mortars, one 120 mm mortar, 30 heavy machine guns, 500 submachine guns, 5,000 Soviet rifles, one boxcar of medical supplies, and another of miscellaneous supplies. The bulk of the ROKA 3rd Division arrived in front of Wonsan by the coastal road. The KPA 24th Mechanized Artillery Brigade, the 945th Regiment (naval amphibious troops) and other units subordinate to the naval headquarters at Wonsan defended the city. KPA artillery pieces emplaced behind dikes just south of it delivered direct fire against the ROKA forces. Troops of both the 3rd and Capital Divisions entered Wonsan on 10 October, with the 3rd Division on the coastal road making the greater effort. About 3 km (2 mi) long and of irregular, narrow width, the city is shaped by the 140-metre-high (450 ft) hills that rise abruptly from the narrow coastal strip. In order to settle rival claims as to which division entered the city first, the Corps commander, Brigadier general Kim Baik Yil decreed that both divisions got there simultaneously at 06:00 and that both secured it at 10:00. But the city was not secured then. Colonel Emmerich, KMAG senior adviser with the 3rd Division, entered the city with the frontline troops of the 23rd Regiment just after noon. The KPA had maintained a heavy artillery fire from the city until almost noon. Then, after withdrawing most of their guns from Wonsan, they fired into the city all afternoon from its northwest sector and the hills behind it. That afternoon the 3rd Division captured the heavily mined airfield on the peninsula east of the city. At nightfall both ROKA divisions were still engaged in street fighting within the city. During the night a KPA armored task force, including about ten 76 mm self-propelled antitank guns, returned to the airfield and did a good job of shooting it up, burning out most of the buildings and hangars.

On 11 October, the 3rd Division fought through Wonsan against KPA artillery, mortar, and small arms fire. It secured the city, and by evening had troops one mile north of it. The Capital Division helped clear the city and occupied the airfield. Walker and 5th Air Force commander General Earle E. Partridge flew into Wonsan Airfield on the 11th. Finding it in good condition, Partridge had 22 planes of the Combat Cargo Command fly in 131 tons of supplies for the ROKA troops the next day. In the week after the capture of Wonsan the 3rd Division remained in the vicinity, securing the area for the expected landing of X Corps. The Capital Division meanwhile moved on north 80 km (50 mi) up the coast, and, against light resistance, secured both Hamhung and its port, Hungnam, on 17 October. During its great success in advancing northward into North Korea the ROKA expanded and reorganized. On 8 October it reactivated the 5th Division at Taegu and once again counted eight divisions, the same number that it had when the war began. Simultaneously, the ROKA activated the 1st Guerrilla Group of five battalions (1st, 2nd, 3rd, 5th and 6th). Eight days later, on 16 October, it activated the ROKA III Corps. This new corps, to which the 5th and 11th Divisions were attached, was to assume responsibility for the ROKA zone south of the Seoul-Ch'unch'-on-Inje-Yangyang axis, and destroy remaining KPA troops and guerrillas in that part of Korea.

=== Eighth Army crosses the 38th Parallel (7 October) ===
On 5 October Eighth Army issued its operations order for the movement across the 38th Parallel, but withheld the date for the attack. On 7 October Eighth Army implemented its order of the 5th by radio messages to US I Corps commander General Frank W. Milburn and to the Chief of Staff, ROKA. The attack on Pyongyang was about to begin. Eighth Army expected strong KPA resistance at the 38th Parallel and a stubborn defense of Pyongyang. According to ROKA intelligence, the North Koreans had three known lines of defense across the peninsula, each consisting of pillboxes, gun emplacements, trenches, and barbed wire entanglements. The first line was along the 38th Parallel and was about 460 m (500 yd) in depth; the second line was about 5 km (3 mi) behind the first; the third lay farther back and was based on locally situated critical terrain features. All three lines were oriented to defend against southern approaches. North of the Parallel the UN Command expected to meet newly activated divisions that had been training in North Korea or elements of units that had engaged in the fighting around Seoul. Some intelligence sources indicated there might be as many as six divisions totalling 60,000 men in North Korean training centers. Actually, only the KPA 19th and 27th Divisions defended the Kumch'on-Namch'onjom area north of Kaesong. Both had been brigades activated in the summer and expanded in September to division status. They engaged in combat for the first time when UN forces crossed the Parallel. On the right (west) of these divisions, the 74th Regiment of the 43rd Division defended the Yesong River crossing site west of Kaesong. The 43rd Division, organized in mid-September, had the task of defending the coastal area beyond the Yesong River. Some elements of the KPA 17th Armored Division engaged in action just north of the Parallel in the zone of the ROK 1st Division, east of the 1st Cavalry Division.

Ready for the attack, the 1st Cavalry Division was deployed in three regimental combat teams just below the Parallel in the vicinity of Kaesong. In the center, Colonel Palmer's 8th Cavalry Regiment was to attack frontally along the main highway axis from Kaesong to Kumch'on; on his right, Colonel Crombez' 5th Cavalry Regiment was to swing eastward, then west, in a circular flanking movement designed to envelop KPA forces south of Kumch'on, 24 km (15 mi) north of the Parallel. Meanwhile, on the division left, Colonel Harris' 7th Cavalry Regiment faced the task of crossing the Yesong River to get on the road running north from Paekch'on to the little town of Hanp'o-ri, 10 km (6 mi) north of Kumch'on, where the main Pyongyang road crossed the Yesong River. At Hanp'o-ri the 7th Cavalry was to establish a blocking position to trap the large KPA forces that Division commander General Hobart R. Gay expected the 8th and 5th Cavalry Regiments to be driving northward. These were the maneuvers involved in the action of the Kumch'on Pocket. Because the prospects of forcing a crossing of the Yesong River did not appear very promising with the support available, Gay and the division staff relied principally on the 8th and 5th Cavalry Regiments for initial success in the attack. The 1st Cavalry Division sent patrols across the Parallel late on the afternoon of the 7th, and others crossed on the night of 8 October. On 9 October, at 09:00 Gay issued his orders, and the division moved up to the Parallel and started fighting its way northward.

=== The Kumch'on Pocket (9–14 October) ===
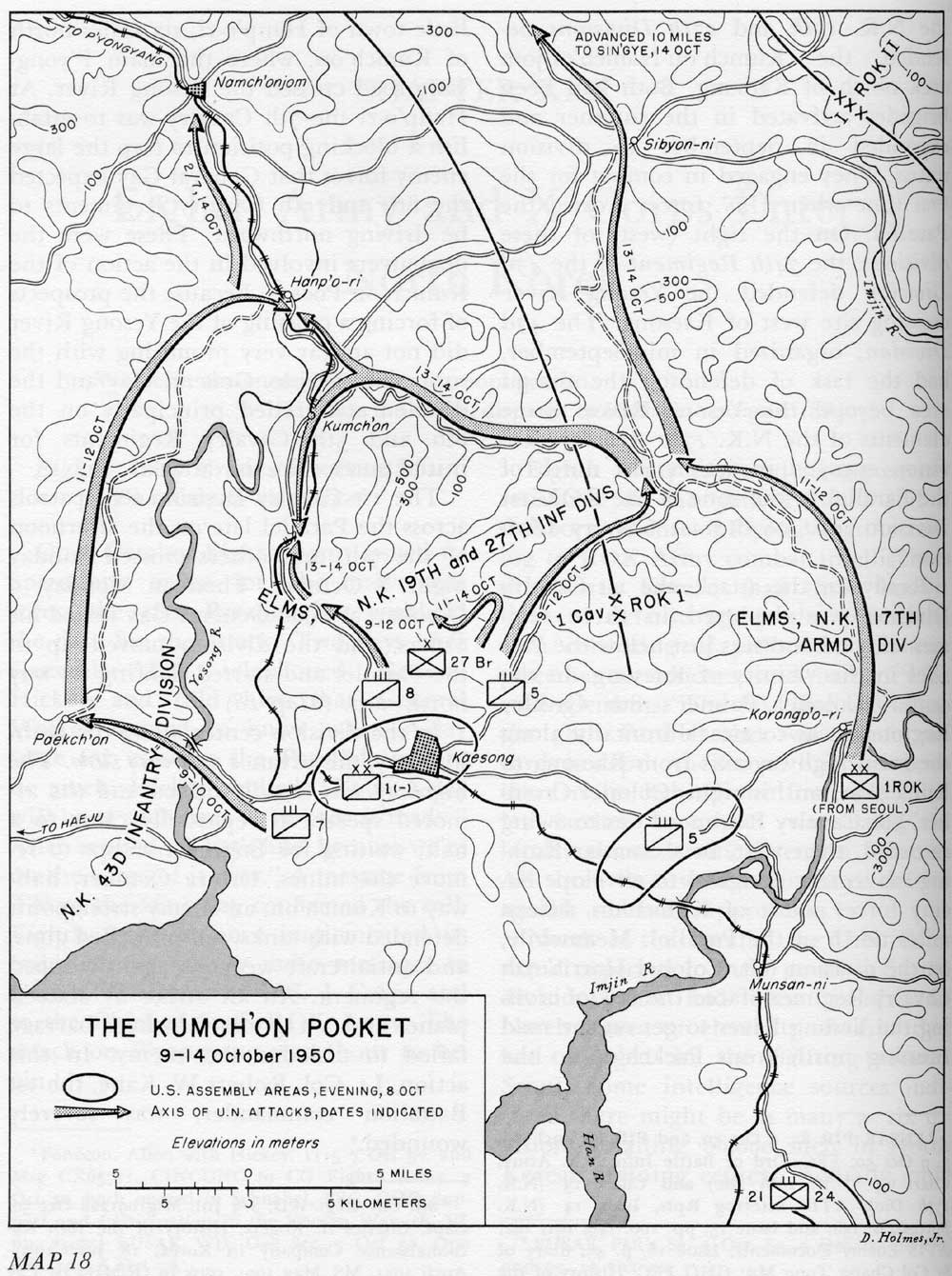
The Kumch'on Pocket, 9–14 October 1950

In the division center along the main highway, the advance was very slow. The highway was heavily mined and the armored spearhead repeatedly came to a halt, waiting for Engineer troops to remove the mines. On 12 October, halfway to Kumch'on, a KPA strongpoint defended with tanks, self-propelled guns, and antiaircraft weapons again stopped the regiment. An air strike by 16 planes and a 155 mm howitzer barrage failed to dislodge the KPA. In this action, Lieutenant colonel Robert W. Kane, the 1st Battalion commander, was severely wounded. On the division right the 5th Cavalry Regiment also had difficulty. It reached the Parallel at 19:30 9 October but did not cross until the next morning. In its initial attack it captured the hills flanking and dominating the road on both sides just above the Parallel. 24 km (15 mi) northeast of Kaesong a KPA force held a long ridge with several knobs (Hills 179, 175, 174) dominating a pass. There it stopped the 1st Battalion. The next day, 12 October, the 2nd Battalion joined in the battle. The 5th Cavalry drove the KPA from the ridge during the afternoon. In the fighting at Hill 174, 1st Lieutenant Samuel S. Coursen, a platoon leader in C Company, went to the aid of a soldier who had entered an enemy emplacement mistakenly thinking it was empty. The soldier escaped with a wound, but Coursen was later found dead there together with seven KPA soldiers whom he had killed in a desperate hand-to-hand struggle. Several of the North Koreans had crushed skulls from rifle butt blows. Coursen was later posthumously awarded the Medal of Honor.

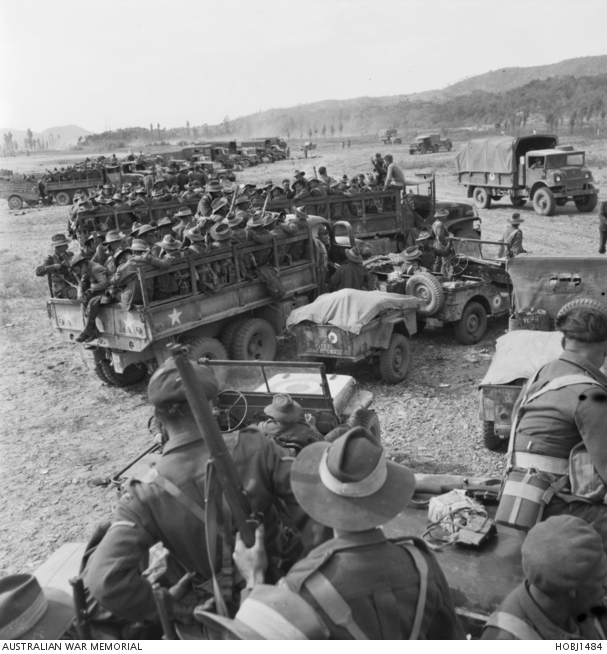
3RAR prepare to move across the 38th Parallel

On 11 October, the 27th British Commonwealth Brigade, with tanks of B Company, 6th Medium Tank Battalion, in support, had crossed the Imjin River and followed the 5th Cavalry Regiment northeast out of Kaesong. Gay's plan was for the brigade to move northwest through the mountains for a close-in envelopment of Kumch'on. His aerial observer, hitherto very reliable, wrongly reported that the roads were as shown on the maps and that the plan was feasible. The road taken by the British, little more than a cart track, dead-ended in the mountains. The Middlesex Battalion got lost on this trail, turned back, and tried another. Despite an arduous effort in the mountains, the British troops never got into the fight for Kumch'on. While the British were crossing the Imjin, the ROKA 1st Division crossed it at Korangp'o-ri at dawn on the 11th, eastward of the 1st Cavalry Division, and attacked northwest on a road that converged with the one taken by the 5th Cavalry Regiment. The 5th Cavalry in the late afternoon of 12 October was engaged in a firefight with the KPA at the objective crossroads when advance elements of the ROKA 1st Division arrived there from the southeast. In a conference on the spot Colonel Crombez and General Paik Sun-yup, the ROKA division commander, agreed that the 5th Cavalry would have precedence on the road until Crombez' troops turned west, 8 km (5 mi) northward on a lateral road leading into Kumch'on. The ROKA 1st Division, following behind the 5th Cavalry, would then continue its attack north to Sibyon-ni where it would veer northwest toward Pyongyang. Tanks of C Company, 6th Medium Tank Battalion, supported the ROKA 1st Division. Of the three regimental attack forces, the 7th Cavalry Regiment on the division left flank had the most difficult assignment, and in fact Gay and his staff expected it to accomplish little. The regiment had to cross the wide Yesong River against defending KPA forces before it could turn north as the lefthand column in the Kumch'on Pocket maneuver. Since all of I Corps' bridging troops and equipment were committed to establishing bridges across the Imjin River at Munsan-ni to support the main effort northward, river crossing support could not be supplied for the 7th Cavalry Regiment at the Yesong River.

On 8 October, the 7th Cavalry Regiment received orders to move up to the Yesong River, search for crossing sites, and clear KPA troops from the area southwest of Kaesong. The Intelligence & Reconnaissance (I&R) Platoon found that the high, 730-metre-long (800 yd) combination highway and rail bridge over the river on the Kaesong-Paekch'on route was standing, although damaged. It was so weakened, however, that it could support only foot traffic. The I&R Platoon received small arms, automatic, and mortar fire from the KPA on the far side of the river. Colonel Clainos, commander of the 1st Battalion, also personally reconnoitered the area with a platoon of A Company on the afternoon of the 8th and received fire from the west bank of the stream. The I&R Platoon leader told him that KPA forces held the west side of the river from the southern tip of the peninsula to a point 800 m (1/2 mi) northeast of the Yesong River bridge. Colonel Harris, the regimental commander, upon receiving the I&R Platoon report that the bridge was usable for foot troops, ordered the platoon to prevent further destruction of the bridge. He then called upon the 1st Battalion to seize the bridge and crossing area. A full report of the situation was given to the 1st Cavalry Division with the recommendation that the 7th Cavalry Regiment seize this unexpected opportunity for a quick crossing of the river. Gay feared that the North Koreans had set a trap in leaving the bridge usable for foot troops, and that KPA zeroed-in mortar and artillery fire and automatic weapons would decimate any troops caught on it. The division staff said also that a regimental attack west of the Yesong River northward could not be supported logistically. The untiring efforts of Harris and his S-3, Captain Webel, however, succeeded in winning from Gay authority to attempt the crossing on the 9th. On the afternoon of 9 October, the 7th Cavalry Regiment delivered three hours of preparatory artillery fire against KPA positions on the west bank of the river. At 15:00, Clainos ordered a platoon of C Company to cross the bridge under cover of the barrage. In crossing the bridge and seizing the immediate approaches on the far side, the platoon suffered a few casualties from small arms fire. Following this platoon, B Company, 8th Engineer Combat Battalion, went on the bridge and spent all night under fire repairing holes in the roadway. After the first troops reached the far side, Clainos sent the rest of C Company across and it occupied the hill on the right of the bridge. Next to cross was B Company, which seized the hill just south of the bridge. The artillery and mortar barrage had been unable to silence KPA mortars, and these fired heavy concentrations on the bridge during the 1st Battalion crossing, which took several hours to complete. The overhead steel girders of the bridge gave excellent protection from fire and prevented many casualties. When the supporting artillery barrage had to be lifted from the immediate environs of the bridge, once the 1st Battalion troops crossed to that side, casualties began to increase rapidly from KPA fire. In this crossing attack, the 1st Battalion had 78 casualties; C Company alone had 7 killed and 36 wounded.

After dark, the KPA launched a counterattack against the 1st Battalion, and Harris ordered Lieutenant colonel Gilmon A. Huff to hasten his crossing with the 2nd Battalion. Just before midnight Huff's battalion started infiltrating across the bridge which was still under some mortar and small arms fire. On the other side, Huff assembled his battalion on the south flank of the 1st Battalion, approximately 90 m (100 yd) west of the bridge. He then attacked west along the Paekch'on road in a column of companies with G Company leading. This attack progressed only a short distance when a heavy KPA counterattack from the south struck the flank of G Company. The counterattack threw the 2nd Battalion into momentary confusion. In the beginning of the fight, small arms fire hit Huff in the shoulder, but he remained with his battalion throughout the night battle. The largest weapons the battalion had at hand were 57 mm recoilless rifles and 60 mm mortars. Huff's unit eventually seized the high ground southeast of the bridge and the road. By dawn, it was clear that the battle was all but over and that the 2nd Battalion would be able to move forward. Huff then turned over command of the battalion to the executive officer who led it in a continuation of the attack westward. The battalion seized Paekch'on and the high ground north of the town in the afternoon.

The next morning, 11 October, the 3rd Battalion, 7th Cavalry, crossed the Yesong River and headed north. Thus, by that morning all three regiments of the 1st Cavalry Division had crossed the 38th Parallel and were driving into North Korea. On the morning of 12 October, the 3rd Battalion, 7th Cavalry, seized its objective—the railroad and highway bridges at Hanp'o-ri north of Kumch'on, and the road juncture there. This closed the western escape route of an estimated 1,000 KPA troops in Kumch'on. Fighter-bombers mistakenly strafed and rocketed the 3rd Battalion at Hanp'o-ri, wounding several men. That evening the 2nd Battalion joined the 3rd Battalion at Hanp'o-ri. During the night at the 3rd Battalion roadblock, the pressure from the 8th and 5th Cavalry Regiments on the North Koreans was made evident. A platoon of L Company ambushed 11 KPA trucks running with their lights on, destroying four trucks loaded with ammunition, capturing six others, killed about 50 KPA soldiers and capturing an equal number. Among the latter was a mortally wounded regimental commander who had in his possession a document indicating that the KPA 19th and 27th divisions intended to break out of Kumch'on the night of 14 October. Before he died the officer said part of the KPA force had been ordered to withdraw to Namch'onjom, a fortified area 24 km (15 mi) north of Kumch'on.

The drive of the 7th Cavalry Regiment northward to Hanp'o-ri after crossing the Yesong River could not have taken place without logistical supply. In the discussions before the 7th Cavalry attack at the Yesong River bridge, the 1st Cavalry Division supply officer advised that he could not provide the gasoline, rations, and ammunition for the drive north from Paekch'on even if the river crossing attempt was successful. Harris and Webel decided to try to obtain the needed logistical support from the 3rd Logistical Command at Inchon by amphibious transport through the Yellow Sea and up the Yesong River. 500 tons of supplies were loaded on thirteen Landing craft and they arrived at the 7th Cavalry crossing site at the Yesong River bridge late in the afternoon of the 10th. Engineer troops from I Corps on the 12th constructed a ponton ferry at the bridge site and it transported the tanks of C Company, 70th Tank Battalion, across the river for support of the regiment.

13 October promised to be a critical day in the efforts of the 1st Cavalry Division to close the Kumch'on Pocket. With the 7th Cavalry blocking the exit road from Kumch'on, the decisive action now rested with the 8th and 5th Cavalry Regiments which were trying to compress the pocket from the south and the east. After it turned west from the Sibyon-ni road the 5th Cavalry encountered an almost continuous minefield in its approach to Kumch'on, and it also had to fight and disperse a KPA force estimated to number 300 soldiers, 13 km (8 mi) from the town. Overcoming these difficulties, the regiment pressed ahead and by the evening of the 13th it was approaching Kumch'on. Strong opposition confronted the 8th Cavalry Regiment on the main highway where the KPA apparently had concentrated most of their available forces and weapons. There, on the morning of the 13th, an artillery preparation employing proximity fuze air bursts blanketed the North Korean positions. Because of the closeness of the American troops to the enemy, a planned B-26 bomber strike was canceled, but a new flight of fighter planes appeared over the KPA positions every 30 minutes. The KPA resisted stubbornly with tanks, artillery, mortars, small arms fire and counterattacks. In one of the counterattacks, KPA tanks rumbled out of the early morning mist to strike an outpost of B Company, 70th Tank Battalion. Sergeant Marshall D. Brewery said his tank gunner first fired on the lead tank at a range of 50 m (50 yd). A second round hit it at a range of 18 m (20 yd). Still the T-34 came on and rammed into the American tank. Brewery's driver put his tank in reverse, jerked loose, and backed away. At a few yards range the gunner fired a third round into the tank which now had a split gun muzzle and was burning. Amazingly, the tank rumbled forward and rammed Brewery's tank a second time. The fourth round finally knocked out this stubborn tank. In the day's series of attacks and counterattacks the 8th Cavalry and supporting arms destroyed eight KPA tanks; B Company, 70th Tank Battalion, accounted for seven of them without loss to itself. While the KPA south of Kumch'on fought desperately and successfully to prevent the 8th Cavalry from closing in on the town, a large KPA column of trucks and carts with an estimated 1,000 soldiers moved northward out of it on the road toward Namch'onjom. At the Hanp'o-ri bridge it ran into the 7th Cavalry roadblock. In the ensuing action the 7th Cavalry, aided by airstrikes, killed an estimated 500 and captured 201 of this force. The other KPA troops escaped into the hills northeast of the town.

At the same time, elements of the KPA 43rd Division cut off below Paekch'on were moving around that town and fleeing north. One such group in company strength occupied old KPA defensive positions just north of the 38th Parallel the night of 12–13 October. The following day it ambushed the tail end of the 1st Battalion, 7th Cavalry, column moving north from Paekch'on. Part of A Battery, 77th Field Artillery Battalion, and B Company, 8th Engineer Combat Battalion were in the ambushed column. A soldier who escaped raced back into Paekch'on to the 3rd Battalion, 21st Infantry Regiment, command post. Colonel Stephens, the regimental commander, happened to be there. Upon hearing what had happened, he directed Lieutenant colonel John A. McConnell, Commanding Officer, 3rd Battalion, to send a company to the scene. McConnell thereupon directed I Company, 21st Infantry, which was on a blocking mission south of the ambush site, to go there. On arrival it engaged and dispersed the KPA force with mortar and small arms fire, and captured 36 North Koreans. In this ambush the North Koreans killed 29 American and eight South Korean soldiers and wounded 30 Americans and four South Koreans. They also destroyed four and damaged 14 vehicles. In this episode, as in so many others like it, those caught in the roadblock apparently made little effort to defend themselves. In another ambush on the road that night KPA troops captured the 2nd Battalion, 7th Cavalry, supply officer and 11 men; subsequently, however, the officer and five men escaped.

At midnight of the 13th, the 2nd Battalion, 5th Cavalry Regiment, resumed its attack on Kumch'on from the east. After dispersing a KPA force near the town, the battalion then entered and seized the northern part of it. The 3rd Battalion following behind seized the southern part. At 08:30, 14 October, Crombez and the regimental command group arrived in Kumch'on. Crombez ordered the 2nd Battalion to turn north toward the 7th Cavalry at Hanp'o-ri and the 3rd Battalion to turn south to meet the 8th Cavalry on the Kaesong road. The 1st Battalion remained behind to secure the town. Advancing northwest, the 2nd Battalion joined elements of the 7th Cavalry above Hanp'o-ri at noon. A KPA force, estimated to number 2,400 men, which had been attacking the 7th Cavalry roadblock position at Hanp'o-ri, escaped into the hills when the 2nd Battalion approached from the south. Meanwhile, attacking south from Kumch'on, the 3rd Battalion neared a special task force of the 8th Cavalry Regiment which had attacked north during the morning and already had lost two tanks to KPA action. The two columns, the 3rd Battalion, 5th Cavalry, and the special 8th Cavalry task force met just after noon about 6 km (4 mi) south of Kumch'on. Even though the 1st Cavalry Division envelopment and capture of Kumch'on had been carried out in five days, a large part of the KPA force in the Kumch on Pocket escaped, mostly to the north and northwest.

The day Kumch'on fell to the 1st Cavalry Division, 14 October, the North Korean Premier and Commander in Chief, Kim Il Sung, issued an order to all troops of the KPA explaining the reasons for the army's defeat and outlining harsh measures for future army discipline. Alluding to the recent reverses, Kim said, "Some of our officers have been cast into utter confusion by the new situation and have thrown away their weapons and left their positions without orders." He commanded; "Do not retreat one step farther. Now we have no space in which to fall back." He directed that agitators and deserters be executed on the spot, irrespective of their positions in the Army. To carry out this order, he directed that division and unit commanders organize, by the following day, a special group, which he termed the "Supervising Army", its men to be recruited from those who had distinguished themselves in battle.

By the close of 14 October, with US I Corps troops through the principal prepared KPA positions between the 38th Parallel and Pyongyang, KPA front lines as such had ceased to exist. The KPA were in a state of utter confusion. In these auspicious circumstances, President Truman on 15 October met MacArthur on Wake Island. A few days earlier, in announcing his intention to make the trip, Truman had said he would discuss with MacArthur "the final phase of U.N. action in Korea".

=== Demining Wonsan Harbour (10–25 October) ===
Following the Inchon landing, evidence began to mount that the North Koreans were mining the coastal waters of North Korea. Three US Navy ships, the USS Brush, Alansfield and USS Magpie, struck mines and suffered heavy damage. Although intelligence sources indicated mines were being laid in coastal waters, little was known about the location and extent of these mine fields. North Korean interests certainly dictated, however, that the sea approaches to Wonsan should be mined. In a series of conferences from 2 to 4 October, Struble and his staff decided to form the Advance Force JTF 7, which would proceed to the objective area and begin minesweeping at the earliest possible date. All minesweepers available were to be concentrated for the task. The group comprised 21 vessels, including ten American and eight Japanese minesweepers, and one Republic of Korea Navy vessel used as a minesweeper. Minesweeping operations at Wonsan began on 10 October. A search by helicopter over the harbor channel showed it to be heavily mined inside the 30-fathom curve. The plan to sweep this channel was cancelled and another substituted—to sweep from the 100-fathom (180 m) curve down the Russian Hydropac Channel passing between Yodo and Hwangt'o-do Islands. By 12 October this channel had been swept a distance of 39 km (24 mi) from the 100-fathom (180 m) curve. 16 km (10 mi) remained to the inner harbor. At this point the novel idea was advanced of exploding mines along a narrow passageway by aerial bombing which would permit the lead sweeps to pass. On 12 October 39 planes from the carriers USS Philippine Sea and USS Leyte flew down the Russian channel dropping 450-kilogram (1,000 lb) bombs. Three minesweepers, USS Pirate, USS Pledge and USS Incredible, then entered the bombed channel to resume minesweeping. Northwest of Yodo Island Pirate struck a mine at 12:09; Pledge hit one six minutes later. Both vessels sank. As Incredible, third in line, maneuvered into safe water, KPA shore batteries opened fire. Twelve men went down with the two ships and one died later from wounds. At least 33 others were wounded and injured in varying degrees.

The menace of shore batteries was removed on 17 October when ROKA I Corps, which had already captured Wonsan, gained control of the peninsulas and islands commanding the harbor approaches, however, casualties from mines continued. On 18 October two ROK Navy vessels struck mines in the Wonsan area; one was disabled at the entrance to the harbor, and the other, a minesweeper, was sunk. The next day a Japanese minesweeper struck a mine and sank. The risk of sending transports with troops to the beaches was still great. The presence of ground mines in the shallow water made necessary a thorough magnetic sweep of the close-in approaches to the landing beaches. Because troops of ROKA I Corps were now well past Wonsan, the military situation did not warrant an unnecessary risk in unloading the Marine units. Struble, therefore, recommended that they not be unloaded on 20 October as planned, but that D-day be deferred until the minesweeping could be completed; Joy and MacArthur concurred. A report from the minesweeper group on 23 October indicated that a channel free of mines had been swept to Blue-Yellow Beach, but that sweeping of the beach area itself was being continued. At a conference on board the USS Missouri the next day, Struble decided that landings could start on the 25th; actually they did not begin until the morning of the 26th. The conference on the 24th also decided that the minesweepers should clear the Wonsan inner harbor. Then they were to sweep the approaches to Hungnam to clear that port. Almond had urged this so that logistical support could be centered there for the X Corps operations in northeast Korea. Not until 4 November did the minesweepers complete their work in the Wonsan inner harbor. Ships of the task force then stood into the harbor and pulled up alongside the dock. The minesweepers then continued to Hungnam where they swept a channel 51 km (32 mi) long and 1,500 m (1,600 yd) wide, as well as an anchorage in the inner harbor. Actually, the minesweepers were busy as long as X Corps was in northeast Korea. Floating mines were common sights at this time off the east coast of Korea in the Wonsan-Hungnam area. One of the worst mine disasters occurred on 16 November, when an Army tug with a crane barge in tow struck a mine off the entrance to Wonsan Harbor and sank, with approximately 30 men lost out of 40.

While the minesweeping was progressing offshore, Lieutenant colonel William J. McCaffrey, Deputy Chief of Staff, X Corps, on 16 October brought the X Corps Advance Command Post to Wonsan by air, flying from Kimpo Airfield. He immediately established communications with ROKA I Corps and the commander of the minesweeping operations. McCaffrey's staff set to work at once with ROKA I Corps G-2 to learn who had laid the mines in the harbor and to find the warehouses where they had been stored. This was done successfully by ROKA I Corps intelligence section. The ROKA found a villager who had worked in the mine depot who guided a party to a depot north of Wonsan where the mines had been stored and assembled. He also provided information enabling the investigators to take into custody one of the sampan captains who had helped plant the mines. The information gained from these sources indicated that 30 Russians had been in Wonsan until 4 October assembling the mines and supervising laying the minefields. Working almost entirely at night, from about 32 small boats, North Korean crews and their supervisors had laid approximately 3,000 mines. The North Koreans and their helpers had not confined laying mines at Wonsan to the waters in the harbor. The beaches were also heavily planted with land mines. This had been expected, and as soon as ROKA I Corps had secured Wonsan it cleared the beaches of mines. On the night of 16 October at the north end of the Wonsan Harbor ROKA troops had stacked about 1,000 9 kg (20 lb) box mines they had just lifted from the beaches. A ROKA lieutenant and five enlisted men decided to have a private celebration, and, moving off about 180 m (200 yd), the lieutenant fired into the stacked mines. The mines exploded, shattering panes of glass in the provincial capital building 3 km (2 mi) away and killing all six ROKA soldiers.

On 20 October Almond flew from the USS Missouri by helicopter to Wonsan Airfield. At noon the X Corps command post was officially opened in Wonsan.

=== Logistical problems ===
The Eighth Army advance into North Korea had begun under great logistical difficulties and was supported only on the narrowest margin. On 10 October, the day after the attack began, Milburn expressed himself as being disturbed by the logistical situation of I Corps. He felt that at least 3,000 tons of balanced stocks should be in the Kaesong ammunition supply points. But Colonel Albert K. Stebbins, Jr., Eighth Army G-4 supply officer, informed him that this could not be accomplished unless all the truck companies were diverted to that task. The unfavorable supply situation largely grew out of the fact that during the first half of October (1–17 October) unloading activities at Inchon for Eighth Army were negligible. Practically all the port capabilities at that time were engaged in mounting out the 1st Marine Division for the Wonsan operation. Levels of some supplies for I Corps were at times reduced to one day, and only selective unloading enabled the supply sections to meet troop requirements. Most combat vehicles, such as tanks, operated in the forward zone without knowing whether they would have enough fuel at hand to continue the attack the next day. Because it could not support any more troops north of the Han River at this time, Eighth Army had been compelled to undertake the movement north of the 38th Parallel with only I Corps, leaving IX Corps below the river. As rapidly as the logistical situation permitted, Walker intended to move IX Corps into North Korea to help in the drive to the border. On 23 October, Walker informed IX Corps commander General John B. Coulter that ROKA III Corps (5th and 11th Divisions) would relieve IX Corps in its zone as soon as practicable for this purpose, and not later than 10 November.

On 19 October the army forward distributing point was at Kaesong. Hence, for most units supplies had to be trucked more than 161 km (100 mi), a most difficult logistical situation even with good roads, and those in Korea were far from that. During this time Eighth Army used about 200 trucks daily to transport food, gasoline, and lubricants to dumps 80 km (50 mi) north of Seoul. A pipeline, completed in October, carried aviation gasoline from Inchon to Kimpo Airfield and helped immensely in supplying the planes with fuel. The 3rd Logistical Command at Inchon was assigned to Eighth Army on 7 October with the primary mission of providing it with logistical support in North Korea. Eighth Army in turn attached the 3rd Logistical Command to the 2nd Logistical Command. From Pusan the 2nd Logistical Command continued of necessity to forward by rail and truck supplies for Eighth Army. The solution to Eighth Army's logistical problems rested in the last analysis on the railroads. Airlift and long-distance trucking were emergency measures only; they could not supply the army for an offensive operation several hundreds of miles from its railhead. At the end of September, rail communications for Eighth Army did not extend beyond the old Pusan Perimeter. Yet the army itself was then at the Han River, 322 km (200 mi) northward. Because of the resulting logistical strain, the repair of the rail line north of Waegwan was of the greatest importance. The reconstruction of the railroad bridges over the major rivers north of Taegu constituted the greatest single problem. To rebuild these bridges Eighth Army marshalled all available bridging equipment and matériel. Engineer construction troops, aided by great numbers of Korean laborers, worked to the limit of their endurance to restore the rail lines northward. The Koreans assumed responsibility for repairing minor bridges, I Corps most of the highway bridges, and Eighth Army the rail bridges and the largest highway bridges. The first great task was to repair the 50 m (165 ft) break in the Waegwan rail bridge over the Naktong. Working 15 m (50 ft) above the water, the engineers, after some preliminary work, in seven days completed the major repairs. Rail traffic crossed the bridge on 5 October. At first all effort was concentrated on opening single track communications over the 320 km (200 mi) of rail from the Naktong to the Han River. This was accomplished on 10 October, 17 days after reconstruction work started at the Naktong River bridge. It was not until 11 days later that a temporary bridge carried rail traffic across the Han into Seoul. But even after trains crossed into Seoul they could proceed only as far as Munsan-ni on the south bank of the Imjin River. This was still 320 km (200 mi) below the Eighth Army front at the Ch'ongch'on River in late October. Thus, at that time the railhead was still as many miles south of the Eighth Army front as it had been a month earlier when the front was in the Seoul area and the railhead was at Waegwan. At Munsan-ni the supplies were unloaded, trucked across the Imjin, and reloaded on trains on the north side. Meanwhile, engineer troops were at work repairing the Imjin River rail bridge. The water span was 490 m (1,600 ft) long, with a length of several thousand feet of earth fill required in its approaches. As a generalization, it may be said that the railhead lagged 200 miles behind the Eighth Army front in October 1950. The daily "must" trains from Pusan at this time were: (1) a train of nine cars to Taejon for the 25th Division; (2) a ration train of 20 cars (200,000 rations) to Yongdungp'o; (3) two ammunition trains of 20 cars each; (4) one hospital train; (5) one POL train of 30 cars; and (6) one train of 20 cars every other day in support of ROK troops based in the Seoul area.

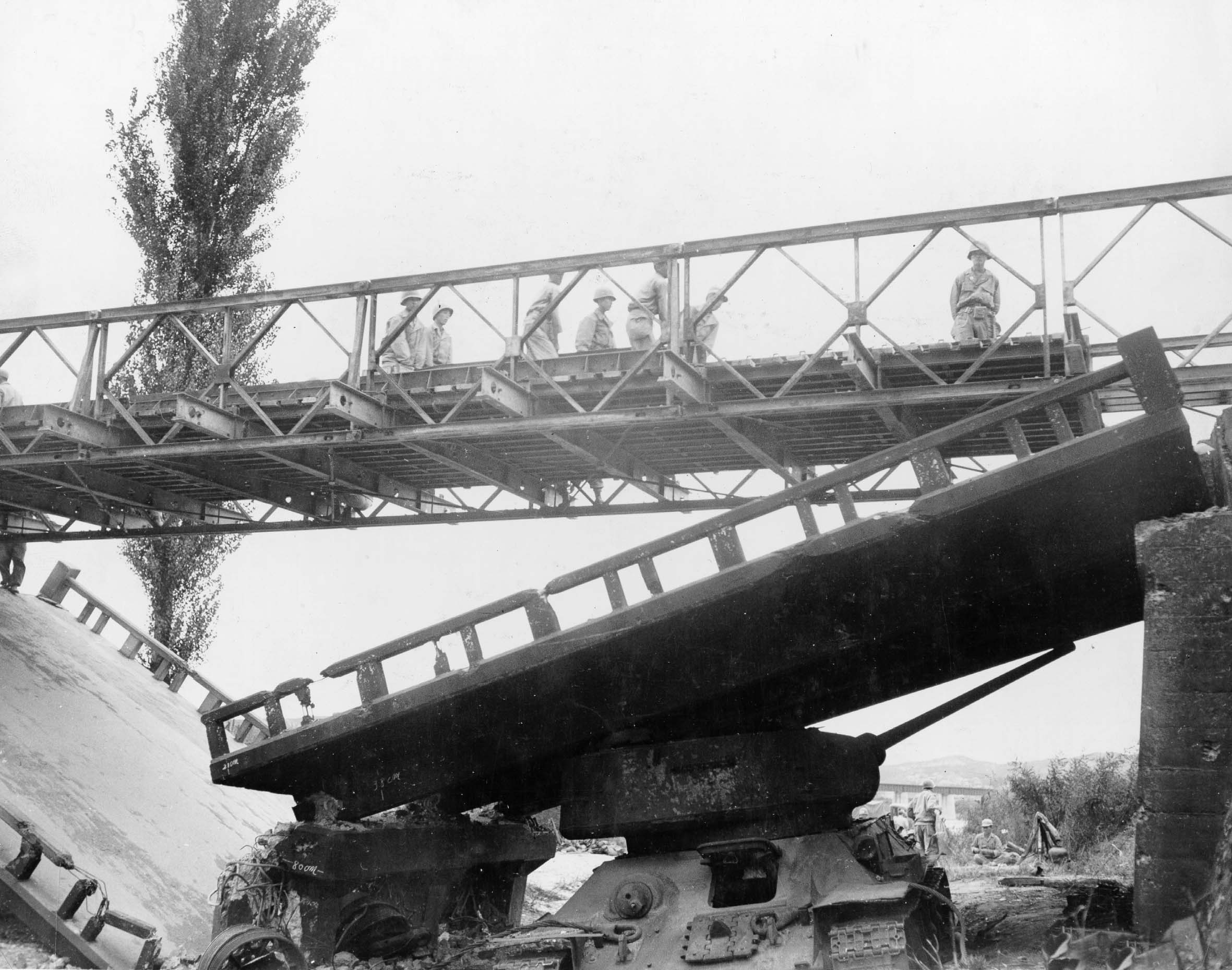
Bailey Bridge over a destroyed bridge near the Naktong River

Repair of the major highway bridges presented a problem just as pressing as repair of the rail bridges. In some respects, it was an even more immediate problem because, in general, the highway bridges could be repaired more quickly, and they were the first used to keep supplies moving forward to the troops. The 63 m (207 ft) span break in the Naktong River highway bridge at Waegwan was closed with pile bents and a 30-metre (100 ft) triple single-panel Bailey bridge. The first traffic crossed the repaired bridge on 30 September. To provide a vehicular bridge across the Han River at Seoul quickly, the FEAF Combat Cargo Command, using 70 C-119 flights, flew in a pontoon bridge from Japan. This 50-ton floating bridge was 230 m (740 ft) long. On 30 September, 3,034 vehicles crossed it, and thereafter traffic passed over it day and night. A second bridge was completed across the Han on 7 October. The next afternoon two-way traffic resumed across the river. At every turn in the operations in North Korea during October, Eighth Army's effort was limited by an adverse logistical situation. Eighth Army's troops had almost reached Pyongyang before it could get any supplies through the port of Inchon, where facilities were still devoted exclusively to outloading X Corps.

=== Battle of Sariwon (17 October) ===
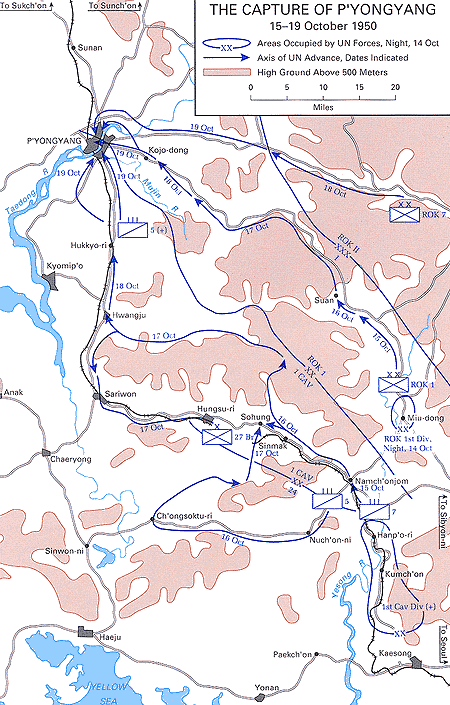
Map of the capture of Pyongyang

With action in the Kumch'on Pocket ended, in the first phase of Eighth Army's drive into North Korea, the 2nd Battalion, 7th Cavalry, marched from Hanp'ori on Namch'onjom. Airstrikes on that town at 07:00, 15 October, preceded the attack. The 2nd Battalion then launched its assault, supported by artillery, against fiercely defending KPA. After hard fighting the 2nd Battalion overcame the KPA and entered Namch'onjom at noon, losing ten men killed and 30 wounded in the battle. KPA prisoners said that strafing attacks on Namch'onjom during the morning had destroyed the 19th Division command post and killed the division chief of staff. Torrential rains now turned the dusty roads into seas of mud, and maneuvers planned to put the 5th Cavalry in front of the retreating enemy came to naught.

On 16 October, Colonel Lynch's 3rd Battalion, 7th Cavalry, led the attack out of Namch'onjom, and by noon it had secured Sohung, 27 km (17 mi) northwest. The 1st Battalion passed through the town, turned north on a secondary road, and prepared to advance on Hwangju the next day. Harris and the regimental headquarters arrived at Sohung late in the afternoon. On the right of the 1st Cavalry Division the ROKA 1st Division had made spectacular progress. On the 13th it entered Sibyon-ni, a vital crossroads northeast of Kaesong. Two days later it engaged a regiment-sized force of KPA, which was supported by six tanks and artillery, in heavy battle in the vicinity of Miu-dong 19 km (12 mi) northeast of Namch'onjom. With his men following the high ground and his tanks on the road, Paik moved ahead. His division fought another battle the next day, 16 October, after which its leading elements entered Suan, 64 km (40 mi) southeast of Pyongyang. Paik said at this time that his tactics were "no stop". It began to look as if his division, the infantry afoot and traveling over secondary roads, was going to beat the American motorized columns to Pyongyang.

On 15 October Milburn reflected Walker's impatience with what Walker thought was a slow advance. Milburn ordered the 24th Division to move into attack position on the left (west) of the 1st Cavalry Division and to seize Sariwon from the south, and then attack north toward Pyongyang. On the same day Gay ordered the 27th British Commonwealth Brigade to assemble behind the 7th Cavalry Regiment and be prepared to pass through it and seize Sariwon. Thus the stage was set for a continuation of the I Corps drive for Pyongyang. Gay has said of that period, "The situation was tense, everybody was tired and nervous." The 21st Infantry Regiment, 24th Division met just enough opposition as it moved from Paekch'on toward Haeju to prevent the infantry from mounting the trucks and rolling along rapidly as a motorized column. Its tank-infantry teams on 17 October overcame 300 KPA defending Haeju and secured the town that afternoon. The 19th Infantry Regiment, 24th Division, meanwhile, trailed the 5th Cavalry Regiment. Both of them turned westward off the main highway at Namch'onjom. The 19th Infantry was to continue westward beyond Nuch'on-ni and then turn north toward Sariwon. On the 16th a bad traffic jam developed on the road up to Namch'onjom where the 27th British Commonwealth Brigade, the 5th Cavalry and the 19th Regiment were all on the road. For long periods the vehicles moved slowly, bumper to bumper. From Namch'onjom westward, the 19th Infantry, behind the 5th Cavalry Regiment, was powerless to accelerate its pace although Division commander General John H. Church had ordered it to do so. Word came at this time that Milburn had told Generals Gay and Church that whichever division—the 1st Cavalry or the 24th Infantry reached Sariwon first would thereby win the right to lead the Corps' attack on into Pyongyang. The 24th Division was handicapped in this race for Sariwon, as it had a roundabout, longer route over inferior roads and poorer supply routes.

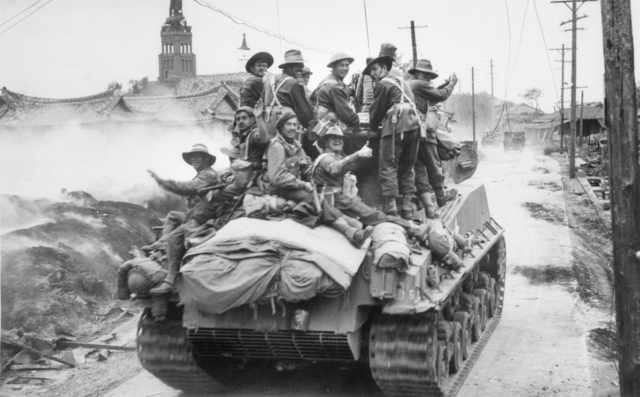
3RAR troops ride on an M4 through Sariwon

On 17 October, with the 1st Battalion in the lead, the 7th Cavalry Regiment followed the secondary "cow path" road north from Sohung in a circuitous route toward Hwangju where it would strike the main Pyongyang highway north of Sariwon. The 27th British Commonwealth Brigade passed through the lines of the 7th Cavalry that morning at Sohung and took up the advance along the main highway toward Sariwon. Sariwon lay some 50 km (30 mi) up the highway almost due west from Sohung. At Sariwon the highway and railroad debouched from the mountains, turned north and ran through the coastal plain to Pyongyang, 56 km (35 mi) away. Only occasional low hills lay across the road between Sariwon and Pyongyang. It was generally expected that the KPA would make their stand for the defense of Pyongyang, short of the city itself, on the heights before Sariwon.

The 27th British Commonwealth Brigade advanced on Sariwon along the main highway capturing the town while the 7th Cavalry Regiment encircled it and moved south. During a day and night of confused engagements, the British/US force killed over 215 and captured more than 3,700 KPA soldiers for minor losses.

=== Capture of Pyongyang (17–20 October) ===
By the time the UN troops reached Sariwon it was clear that the remaining KPA forces could not attempt a strong defense of Pyongyang without incurring total destruction or capture. The KPA by this time not only had to contend with US I Corps, approaching Pyongyang along the main Seoul axis from the south, but also the enveloping movements of the ROKA forces from the southeast and east. Some of these forces, if they continued their rapid advance for a few days more, would almost certainly cut on the north the highways and exits from the city. Pyongyang would then be surrounded and any forces retained in and around the city for its defense would face either destruction or surrender.

The 1st Cavalry Division had won the role of leading the attack into Pyongyang and they began their assault on 18 October. Almost simultaneously with the 1st Cavalry Division's arrival at Pyongyang the ROKA 1st Division entered the city on the Sibyon-ni-Pyongyang road at a point northeast of the 1st Cavalry Division. The US and ROKA forces cleared the city of KPA by 20 October.

=== The Chinese intervene (19 October) ===
The destruction of the KPA and the rapid advance of UN forces through North Korea towards the Chinese border on the Yalu River had prompted Chairman of the Chinese Communist Party, Mao Zedong, to order the People's Liberation Army's North East Frontier Force to enter North Korea and engage UN forces under the name People's Volunteer Army (PVA). In order to stabilize the rapidly collapsing Korean front and to push back the advancing UN forces, Mao authorized the First Phase Campaign, a bridgehead-building operation with the aim of destroying ROKA II Corps, the vanguard and the right flank of the Eighth Army. After the Chinese leadership finally settled the issue of armed intervention on 18 October, Mao ordered the PVA to enter Korea on 19 October under strict secrecy.

=== Sukchon, Sunchon and Yongyu (20–22 October) ===
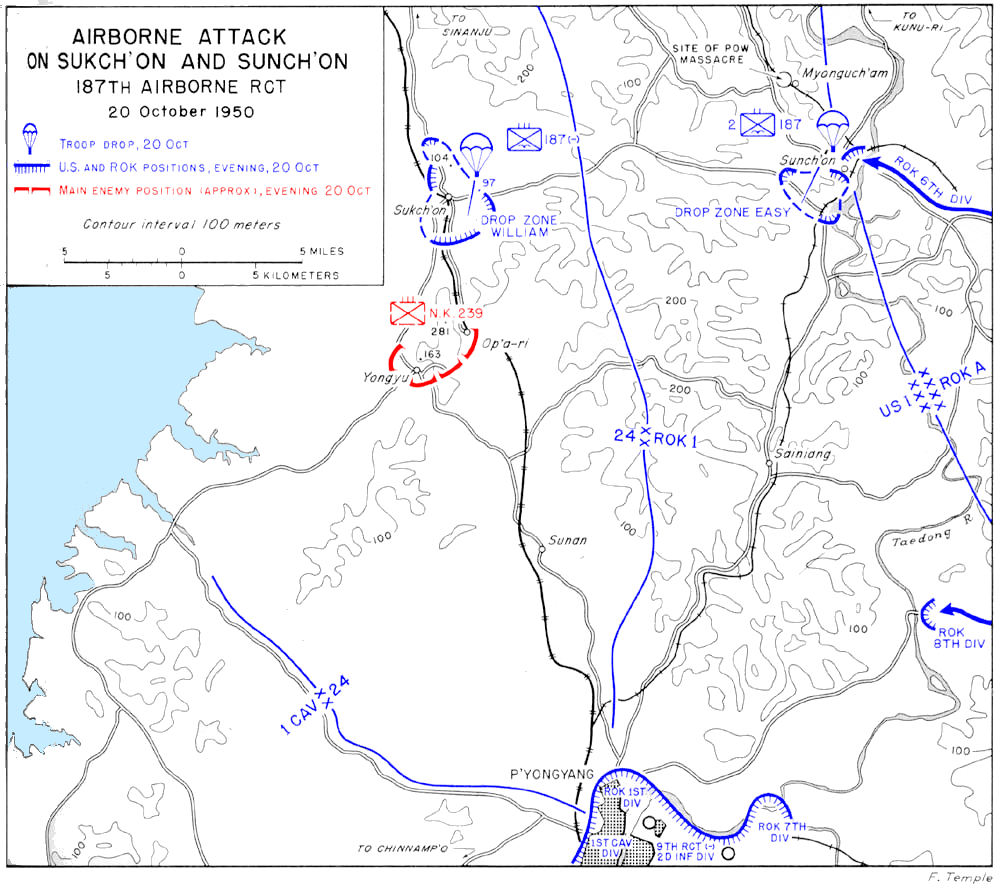
US 187 RCT airdrop at Sukchon and Sunchon, 20–21 October 1950

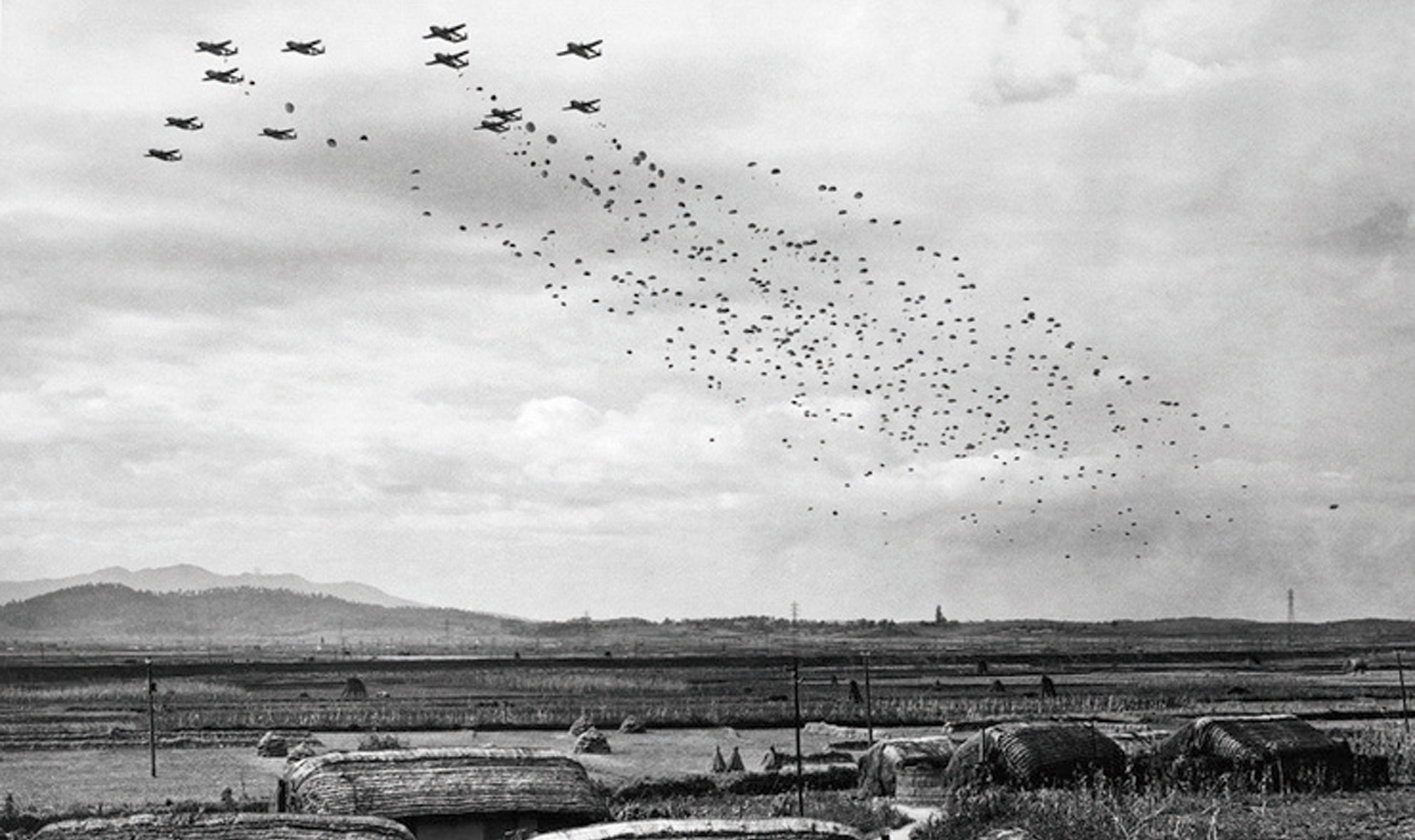
187th RCT parachute drop

On 20 October the US 187th Airborne Regimental Combat Team (187th RCT) was parachuted ahead of the advancing UN spearheads into drop zones in Sukchon and Sunchon, 40 kilometres north of Pyongyang, with the objectives of cutting off the retreating KPA forces that were withdrawing up the west coast of the Korean Peninsula and releasing US and South Korean prisoners of war. Although the airborne drop itself was a success, the operation came too late to intercept any significant KPA elements and the US landings initially met little resistance. However, on 21 October as the 187th RCT began to advance south to the clear the Sukchon to Yongyu road towards Pyongyang the Americans came under heavy attack from the KPA 239th Regiment and requested assistance.

The British 27th Commonwealth Brigade was ordered to assist the 187th RCT. The brigade crossed the Taedong River at Pyongyang at noon on 21 October, and moved north on the main highway to Sukchon with the task of reaching the Ch'ongch'on River. The 1st Battalion, Argyll and Sutherland Highland Regiment, subsequently pushed up the road until fired upon by KPA forces in the hills to the south of Yongyu. By nightfall the hills were cleared by the Argylls, while the 3rd Battalion, 187th RCT occupied Yongyu. Cut-off, about midnight the KPA 239th Regiment attempted to break out, resulting in heavy fighting. The KPA attacks drove the 187th RCT from Yongyu, forcing them back onto the battalion's main defensive position to the north. 3rd Battalion, Royal Australian Regiment (3 RAR) was ordered to take the lead the following morning. By dawn the Americans again requested assistance. At first light on 22 October, two companies of Argylls advanced into Yongyu, before the Australians passed through them riding on M4 Sherman tanks. Now leading the brigade, at 09:00 the Australians came under fire from a KPA rearguard position in an apple orchard on their right flank. 3 RAR carried out an aggressive attack off the line of march from the road, with US tanks in support. Despite fire support from mortars and artillery being unavailable due to the location of 3/187th RCT being unknown, the Australian attack succeeded and the KPA forces were forced to withdraw from the high ground, having suffered heavy casualties. Meanwhile, 3 RAR's tactical headquarters came under attack and was forced to fight off a group of North Koreans. Having been forced off the high ground, the KPA were now caught between the advancing Australians and the 187th RCT to the north. Attacking the North Koreans from the rear, 3 RAR subsequently relieved the 187th RCT, with the Commonwealth Brigade linked up with them by 11:00. Caught between the 187th RCT and the Commonwealth Brigade, the KPA 239th Regiment was practically destroyed.

=== KPA massacre at Sunchon ===
After the airdrop, a new task force, formed around the 1st Battalion, 8th Cavalry Regiment, and a company of tanks, 70th Tank Battalion, started from Pyongyang to make junction with the airborne troops at Sunchon. Lieutenant colonel William M. Rodgers of the tank battalion commanded the task force. It arrived at Sunchon at 09:00 on 21 October, picking up five escaped American prisoners. At the bridge just south of Sunchon, a few KPA troops hiding in holes under it opened fire as Task Force Rodgers came up and killed two men of the 8th Cavalry. The KPA had remained unobserved even though some airborne troops were on the bridge. Gay and Brigadier general Frank A. Allen, Jr., from an L-5 Sentinel had watched Task Force Rodgers successfully establish contact with the airborne troops. Upon returning to Pyongyang, Allen climbed into his jeep and accompanied by his aide, his driver, and two war correspondents from the Associated Press and Baltimore Sun, started for Sunchon, arriving there about noon.

Allen had been in the command post of the 2nd Battalion, 187th RCT, only a short time when a Korean civilian came in and excitedly told a story of KPA troops murdering about 200 Americans the night before at a railroad tunnel northwest of the town. Allen determined to run down this story at once. His group set out with the Korean civilian and, on the way, stopped at the ROKA 6th Division command post in Sunchon. A ROKA colonel, an interpreter, and a driver in a second jeep joined Allen and drove with him to a railroad tunnel just beyond the village of Myonguch'am, 8 km (5 mi) northwest of Sunchon. They arrived there at 15:00. The railroad ran along a hillside cut and entered the tunnel some distance above the dirt road the men had followed. While the rest waited on the road, the ROKA colonel climbed the hillside and entered the tunnel. He came back and said he had found seven dead Americans inside. Allen and the others now climbed to the tunnel. Inside it near the far end they found the seven emaciated bodies on straw mats beside the rail track. These men had either starved to death or died from disease. Some had old wounds, apparently battle wounds. The colonel had walked on through the tunnel. He reappeared at the end and called out that he could see five Americans on the ridge top. Everyone hurried outside and started down the track. A little distance beyond the tunnel, a thin, wounded American soldier staggered from the brush. He was PFC Valdor John, who pointed into the brush. Seventeen dead Americans, all shot, lay there in a gully. John had escaped by feigning death. Allen started climbing the ridge to the Americans who could be seen on top. Whitehead walked off alone across the railroad track into a cornfield on the other side. There he accidentally stumbled upon a semi-circle of 15 more dead Americans. They had been shot as they sat on the ground with rice bowls in hand expecting to receive food. Whitehead turned back to report to Allen; on his way back three American survivors came from among some bushes to him. Allen brought six more Americans who had escaped down off the ridge.

The survivors told the story of what had happened. Two trains, each carrying about 150 American prisoners of war, had left Pyongyang on the night of 17 October, making frequent stops to repair the tracks, and crawling north at a snail's pace. Each day five or six men died of dysentery, starvation, or exposure. Their bodies were removed from the train. A few men escaped as the train traveled north. On the afternoon of 20 October, while the parachute jump was in progress, the second of the two trains stayed in the tunnel northwest of Sunchon to escape the air activity in the vicinity. The group of 100 prisoners of this train, crowded into open coal gondolas and boxcars, was the remnant of 370 whom the KPA had marched north from Seoul more than a month earlier. That evening, the prisoners had been taken from the train in three groups to receive their evening meal. They were shot as they waited for it. The train and the KPA guards left that night. From this story it appeared that there was another group of murdered men yet to be found. A search revealed a fresh burial place, and, upon removal of a thin covering of earth, the men discovered 34 more bodies. Altogether there were 66 dead (exclusive of the seven found in the tunnel) and 23 survivors, some of the latter critically wounded. Two of these died during the night, leaving only 21 who survived. A ROKA detachment safely conveyed the rescued Americans and the dead to Pyongyang, where C-54 Skymasters flew them to Japan.

=== Advance to Ch'ongch'on (22–24 October) ===
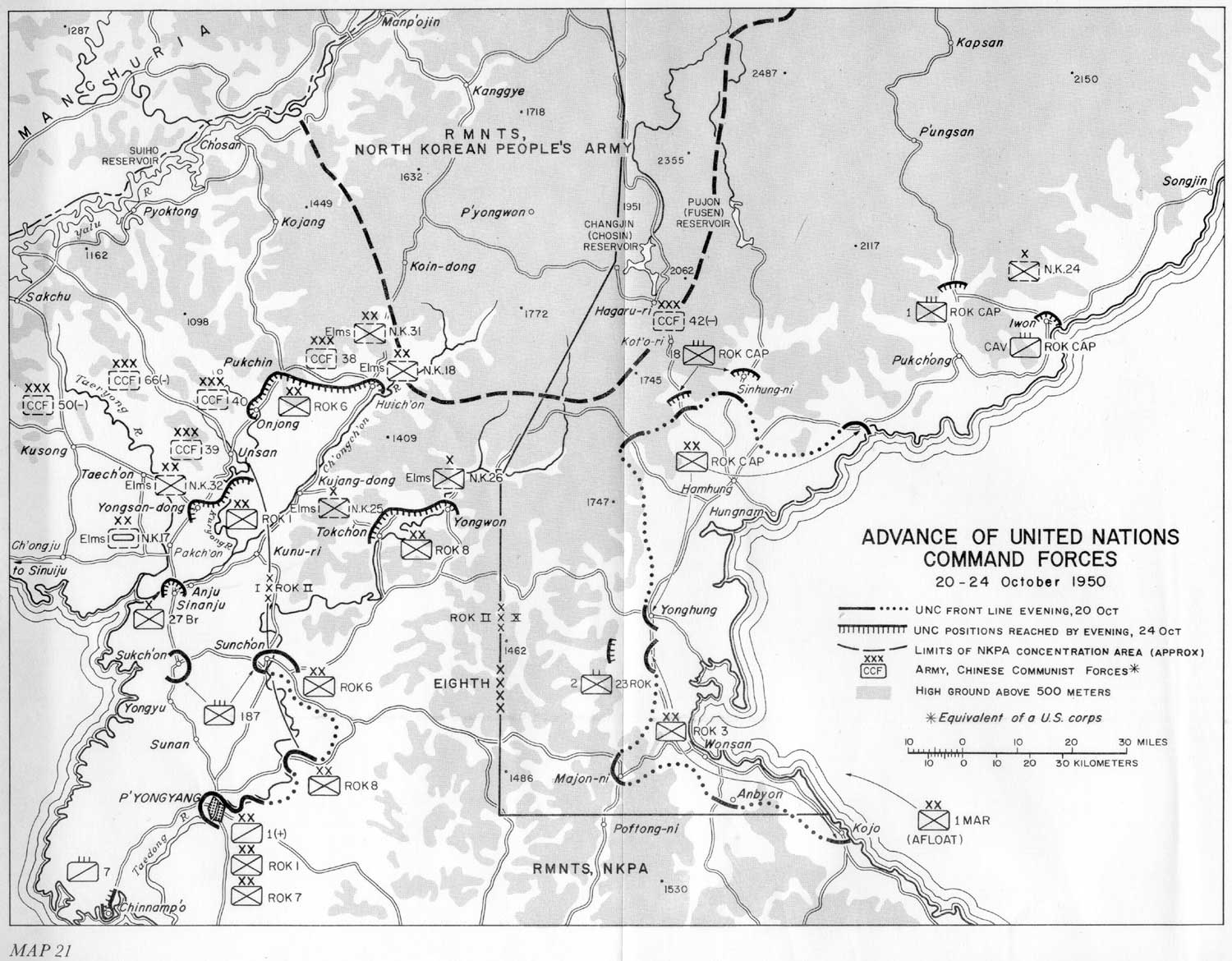
UN offensive into North Korea, 20–24 October 1950

Even as the 187th RCT landed at Sukch'on, the Eighth Army intelligence officer was preparing his estimate that the North Koreans would be incapable of making more than a token defense of the Ch'ongch'on River barrier, 72 km (45 mi) north of Pyongyang. He predicted that the KPA withdrawal would continue on to the north along the axes of two rail and highway routes, the first bending to the right and leading northeast from Sinanju and Anju on the Ch'ongch'on through Huich'on to Kanggye deep in the rugged mountains of central North Korea, 35 km (22 mi) from the Yalu River; and the second, the west coastal route, bending left and running northwest from the Ch'ongch'on River to Sinuiju near the mouth of the Yalu River at the Manchurian border.

North Korean radio on 21 October announced that Premier Kim Il Sung's government had established a new capital at Sinuiju, on the south bank of the Yalu and opposite the Chinese city of Andong on the north bank. But the North Korean capital soon moved on to Kanggye, and it was there in the mountains that the remnants of the North Korean Government and military power assembled. The Kanggye-Manp'ojin area, mountainous in the extreme and heavily wooded, was an ideal area in which to fight defensive delaying actions. It had been a stronghold of Korean guerrilla operations during Japanese rule. Many crossings of the Yalu were near at hand, it was centrally located, and it had lateral road communications to both northeast and northwest Korea.

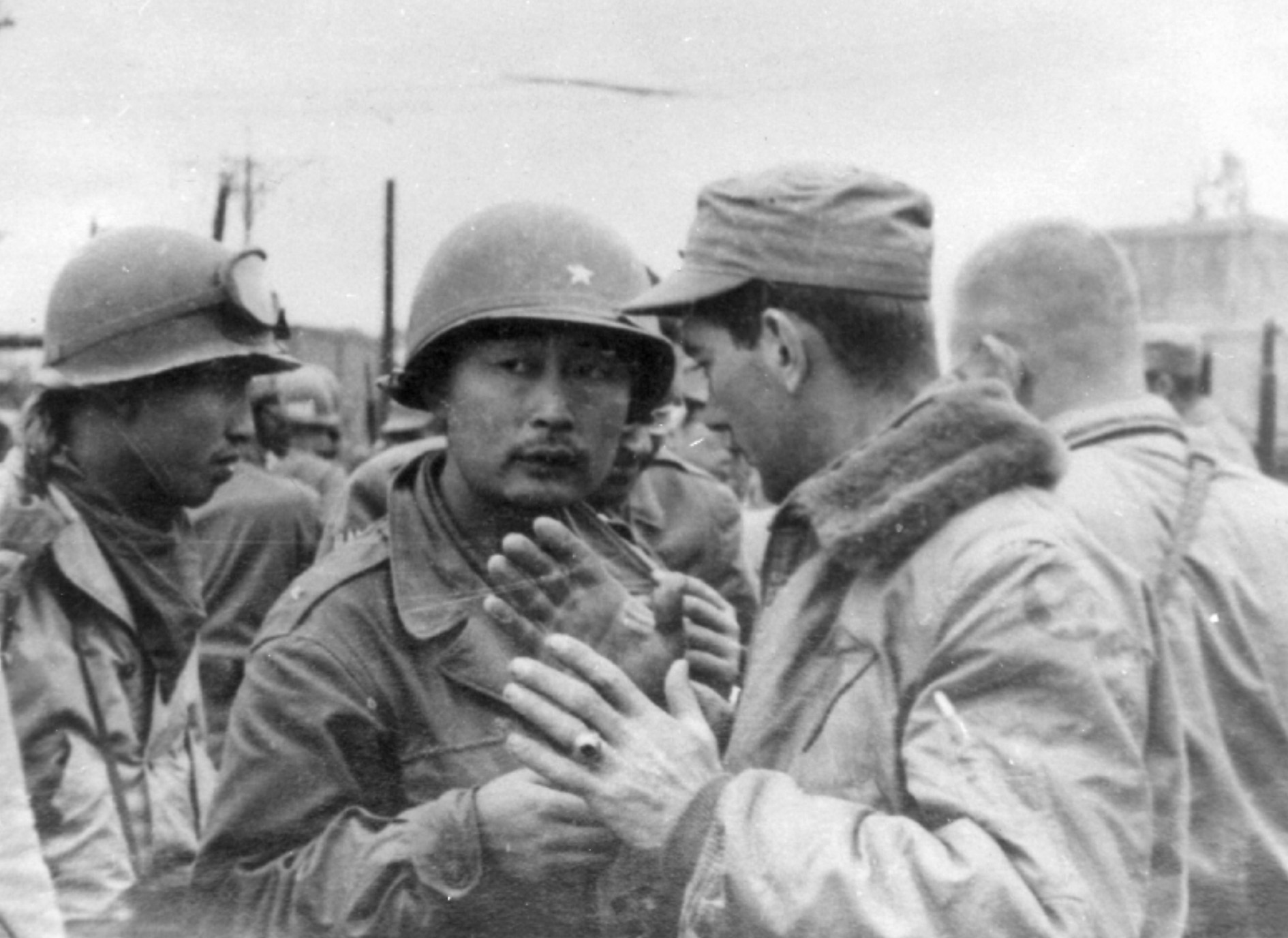
ROK 1st Division commander, General Paik Sun-yup confers with an officer

On 22 October, C Company, 6th Medium Tank Battalion, designated Task Force Elephant, started from Pyongyang by way of Sunch'on for Kujang-dong to block the railroad there. Passing through Sunch'on, the task force arrived at its objective at 22:00 and then turned west to Kunu-ri, 32 km (20 mi) downstream in the valley of the Ch'ongch'on. The ROKA 1st Division followed behind the task force. The ROKA recovered 40 escaped American prisoners whom they evacuated at once to Pyongyang. Two more escaped prisoners came in at Kunu-ri the next morning, 23 October. That afternoon, a sergeant of the ROKA 6th Division found the bodies of 28 American prisoners on the railroad track, and three men still alive, 6 km (4 mi) north of Kujang-dong. On 23 October Paik led his division from Kunu-ri down the valley of the Ch'ongch'on. Near Anju, D Company tanks knocked out two T-34 tanks and two self-propelled guns, and captured one tank intact. Just before noon, a platoon of tanks seized the damaged wooden bridge over the Ch'ongch'on River 5 km (3 mi) northeast of Anju. A tank patrol continued downstream to Sinanju, which it found deserted and the bridges there across the Ch'ongch'on destroyed. Repair of the Anju bridge began at once and continued through the night. By 09:00 on 24 October wheeled traffic, including 2½-ton trucks, could cross on it. During that morning a reconnaissance party found a tank ford 5 km (3 mi) east of the bridge, and the 6th Medium Tank Battalion crossed the river there. All three regiments of the ROKA 1st Division crossed the Ch'ongch'on on 23–24 October. The division then attacked northeast toward Unsan.

Complying with I Corps' order to continue the advance beyond Pyongyang, advance elements of the 24th Division arrived in an assembly area north of the city on the evening of 22 October, and there the division assumed control of the 27th British Commonwealth Brigade, the 89th Medium Tank Battalion, and the 90th Field Artillery Battalion. Meanwhile, the British Brigade had hurried on northward from Sukch'on. On 23 October it arrived at Sinanju only a few hours after the ROKA 1st Division tank patrol entered the town. It also secured the airstrip 8 km (5 mi) to the southwest. By this time the 24th Division completed its move to Sunan, 19 km (12 mi) north of Pyongyang. The Ch'ongch'on River at Sinanju, not far from the sea, is wide, has 3.7 m (12 ft) tides, and deep mud along its edges. On the 24th the British Middlesex 1st Battalion started crossing in assault boats. The rest of the brigade and the vehicles crossed that night over the ROKA 1st Division bridge at Anju. The 3rd Engineer Combat Battalion now worked to clear the highway to Sinanju, and to improve it for carrying the main part of Eighth Army's logistical support in the projected drive to the Manchurian border.

While US I Corps on the UN left advanced to the Ch'ongch'on, two divisions of the ROKA on its right also took up the advance. The 6th Division turned northeast from Kunu-ri up the Ch'ongch'on River on the road that led through Huich'on to Kanggye. East of it the 8th Division reached Tokch'on at midnight of 23 October. There it turned north and struck the Ch'ongch'on at Kujang-dong two days later. Both the 6th and 8th Divisions were now in exceedingly mountainous country. Near Kunu-ri the 6th Division captured two trains, one carrying eight tanks, and, farther on, near Kujang-dong, it captured 50 boxcars of ammunition. The division had a hard fight with an estimated regiment of KPA south of Huich'on but dispersed this force and entered Huich'on on the night of the 23rd. There it captured 20 T-34 tanks needing only minor repairs. At Huich'on the 6th Division turned west, and later north, its objective being Ch'osan on the Yalu River. It was now far in front of any UN division.

=== Advance to the Yalu (24–30 October) ===
Until 17 October MacArthur's orders, based on the JCS directive of 27 September, had restrained UN ground forces other than ROKA troops from operating north of a line extending from Ch'ongju on the west through Kunu-ri and Yongwon to Hamhung on the east coast. On 17 October MacArthur, in his UNC Operations Order 4, lifted this restriction and advanced northward the line below which all UN ground forces could operate. This new line, confirmed in a message to all commanders on 19 October, extended generally from Sonch'on through Koin-dong-P'yongwon- P'ungsan to Songjin on the east coast. It was generally 50–60 km (30–40 mi) south of the Manchurian border across the greater part of the peninsula, and was within the spirit and meaning of the JCS directive of 27 September, which was still in effect. In the policy set out in this directive, only ROKA forces were to be used in the provinces of Korea bordering on the Yalu River. But on 24 October, as the leading UN forces crossed the Ch'ongch'on River, MacArthur issued an order to his ground commanders in Korea which changed all earlier orders drastically. He now removed all restrictions on the use of UN ground forces south of the border, and instructed his commanders to press forward to the northern limits of Korea, utilizing all their forces. Thus, when Eighth Army began what it thought would be the last series of maneuvers to end the war it did so under orders radically different from those that had so far guided its operations in Korea. The day it was issued, this order brought a message from the JCS to MacArthur stating that it was not in accord with the directive of 27 September and asking for an explanation. MacArthur's reply the next day justified lifting the restriction as a matter of military necessity. He said that the ROKA forces could not handle the situation by themselves, that he felt he had enough latitude under existing directives to issue the order, and that, furthermore, the whole subject had been covered in the Wake Island Conference. While it is clear that the JCS felt that MacArthur had violated their basic 27 September directive, they did not countermand his orders to go to the Yalu. When the 27th British Commonwealth Brigade crossed the Ch'ong-ch'on, that unit, the US 24th Infantry Division which followed, and all the other UN troops deployed in Korea, were authorized to go to the Yalu River —to the extreme northern limits of the country.

The Ch'ongch'on River and its tributaries, the Kuryong and Taeryong Rivers, all flowing from the north, together form the last major water barrier in the western part of North Korea short of the border. The Ch'ongch'on valley is a wide one for Korea, varying in width from 5–32 km (3–20 mi). The Ch'ongch'on, like the Yalu, flows from the northeast to the southwest and it generally parallels the Yalu at a distance of approximately 105 km (65 mi). The Ch'ongch'on River, the principal terrain feature in the field of operations for Eighth Army, largely dictated the army's deployment and tactical maneuvers. The main Pyongyang highway crosses the Ch'ongch'on at Sinanju and runs west and northwest in the coastal area to Sinuiju at the North Korean border. Inland from the west coast, mountainous spines run down from the Yalu to the valley of the Ch'ongch'on and the terrain becomes ever rougher and more forbidding. These mountains reach their greatest heights and become almost trackless wastes in central Korea between the Changjin (Chosin) Reservoir and the Yalu. The Yalu itself, save for its lower west coast reaches, runs through a gorge-like channel rimmed by high mountains on both sides. The Suiho hydroelectric dam on the middle Yalu impounds a reservoir of the same name that extends upstream for 100 km (60 mi), pushing water into hundreds of little lateral fjordlike mountain valleys. Above the reservoir there is a major crossing of the Yalu at Manp'ojin. 30 km (20 mi) southeast of Manp'ojin, situated in the very heart of the mountain fastness, is Kanggye. There the North Korean governmental officials and high military commanders assembled. From there, if necessary, they could retreat across the Yalu at Manp'ojin to the sanctuary of Manchuria. From the valley of the Ch'ongch'on the principal road to Kanggye and Manp'ojin ran northeast from the Sinanju- Anju-Kunu-ri area through Huich'on. A railroad followed the same passageway. From the lower valley of the Ch'ongch'on, 80 km (50 mi) inland from the west coast, an important secondary road network ran north through Unsan to the Yalu. The events of the next few weeks were to give this particular road net special importance. The configuration of the valley of the lower Ch'ongch'on in relation to the mountain ridges that approach it from the Yalu must be noted. North of the lower Ch'ongch'on for a distance of approximately 25 km (15 mi) the ground is flat or only slightly rising with occasional low hills. A lateral road extending eastward from Yongsan-dong and generally paralleling the river marks the cleavage line between this low ground, which in a broad sense can be described as the valley of the Ch'ongch'on, and the mountain spurs that rise rather abruptly from it and extend to the Yalu. The southern extremities of these mountain ranges with their limited corridors of passage form a natural defensive barrier to a military advance northward. The towns of Taech'on, Unsan and Onjong stand at the entrances to these mountain corridors.

The Eighth Army operation above the Ch'ongch'on began essentially as a continuation of the pursuit that had started with the breakout from the Pusan Perimeter; US I Corps was on the left, ROKA II Corps on the right. Within I Corps, the 24th Division (27th Commonwealth Brigade attached) was on the left, the ROKA 1st Division on the right. The UN Command expected little organized opposition from the KPA and emphasized a speedy advance to the northern border. Several columns were to strike out northward with little or no physical contact between them. The advance was not to be closely co-ordinated; each column was free to advance as fast and as far as possible without respect to gains made by others.

=== The ROKA 6th Division reaches the Yalu (24–26 October) ===
As Eighth Army resumed its general advance toward the North Korean border, the ROKA 6th Division of ROKA II Corps appeared to have the greatest success of any front-line UN division. Meeting no serious opposition and traveling fast up the valley of the Ch'ongch'on, it reached Huich'on the night of 23 October. There it left the valley of the Ch'ongch'on and turned west, the 7th Regiment leading. Its advanced battalion marched northwest over a cart trail, but the remainder of the regiment had to turn west from Huich'on on a road to Onjong. The night of 24–25 October, the 7th Regiment passed through Onjong, then turned north and joined its advanced battalion. Finding the road clear, it headed north for its objective, the town of Ch'osan, 80 km (50 mi) away on the Yalu. Late in the afternoon the regiment stopped at Kojang, a sizable town 29 km (18 mi) south of Ch'osan, and bivouacked there for the night. The next morning, 26 October, Major Harry Fleming, KMAG adviser with the ROKA 7th Regiment, accompanied the Reconnaissance Platoon, reinforced, into Ch'osan. The remainder of the regiment stayed at its overnight position. In Ch'osan the Reconnaissance Platoon found North Koreans retreating into Manchuria across a narrow floating footbridge that spanned the Yalu. Fleming and the ROKA officers directed the setting up of machine guns to halt this foot traffic into Manchuria, but placed the weapons so that the impact area of their fire would not be in China across the river. After a thorough reconnaissance of the town, Fleming and the main body of the Reconnaissance Platoon returned to the regimental position. They left a small party in Ch'osan because the next morning the main force of the 7th Regiment was to come into the town. The Reconnaissance Platoon from the 7th Regiment, 6th Division, was the first unit to reach the northern border of North Korea, and, as events turned out, it was the only element operating under Eighth Army command ever to get there during the war. Following behind the 6th Division, the ROKA 8th Division had reached the valley of the Ch'ongch'on at Kujangdong the night of 25–26 October, marching from Sunch'on through Tokch'on. On the 26th, the day the advanced elements of the 6th Division reached the Yalu, the 8th turned up the Ch'ongch'on Valley toward Huich'on for the purpose of joining the 6th Division.

=== Battle of Kujin (25–26 October) ===
On 25 October the 27th Commonwealth Brigade had resumed their advance towards Pakchon after crossing the Ch'ongch'on River, with 3 RAR as the lead battalion. Arriving at Kujin, the Australians discovered that the centre span of the 300-metre (330 yd) concrete bridge had been demolished by North Korean engineers, blocking their passage across the river. A platoon-sized reconnaissance patrol crossed the river using debris from the destroyed span; however, it was soon forced to withdraw by North Koreans holding the high ground. The subsequent battle continued until midday on 26 October when the KPA withdrew. Commonwealth Brigade losses were eight killed while KPA losses were 100 killed and 350 captured.

=== Chinese First Phase Campaign (25 October – 6 November) ===
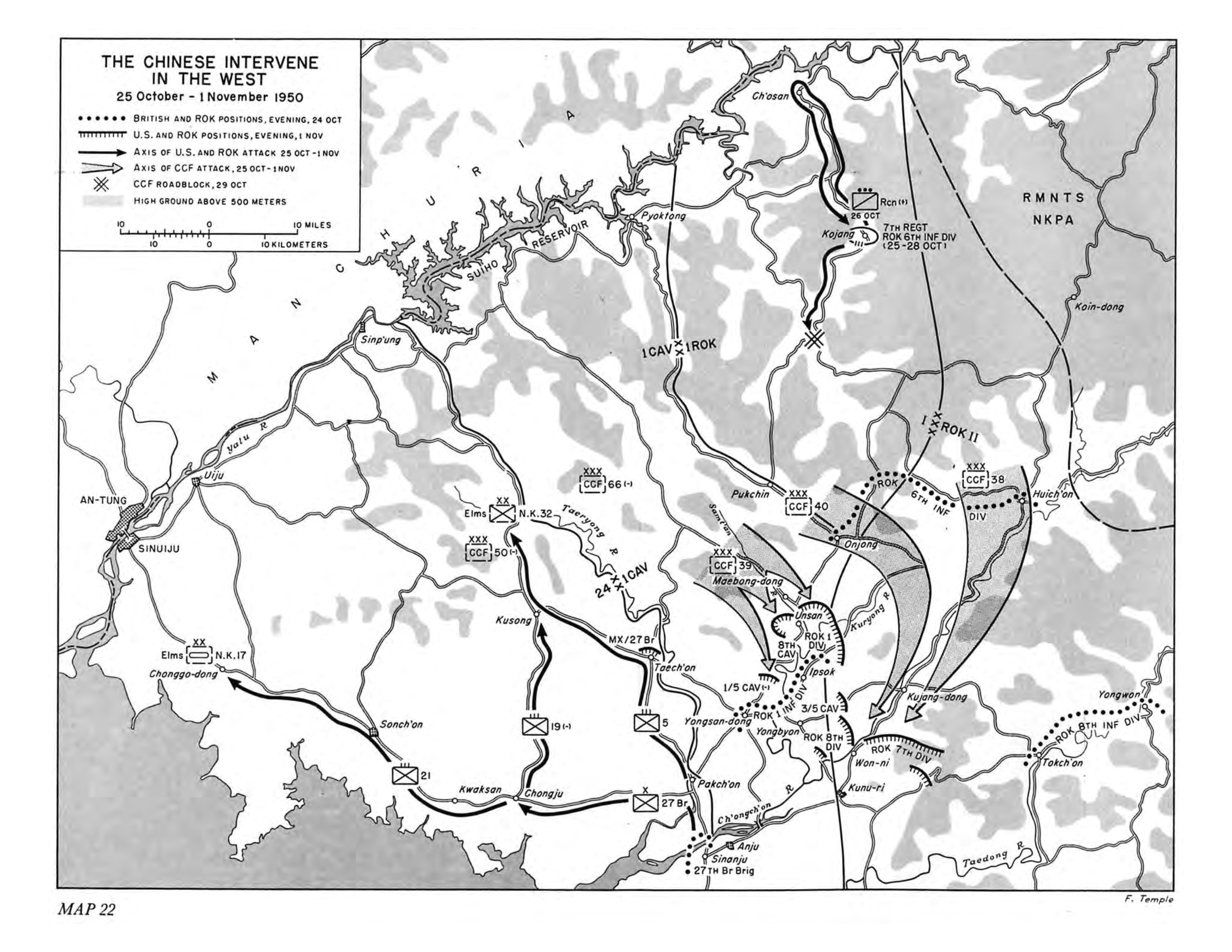
The Chinese First Phase Campaign, 25 October – 1 November

The first engagements by the PVA would be in the Battles of Onjong, Unsan and Pakchon in which they probed the strength of the UN forces and identified weak points.

At Onjong from 25 to 29 October 1950, the PVA 40th Army conducted a series of ambushes against the ROKA 6th Infantry Division, effectively destroying the right flank of the United States Eighth Army while stopping the Eighth Army from advancing further towards the Yalu River.

Exploiting the situation, the PVA launched another attack on the now exposed Eighth Army center on 1 November, resulting in the loss of the ROKA 15th Infantry Regiment and the US 8th Cavalry Regiment at Unsan. With the Chinese forces pouring into the rear of the UN lines, the Eighth Army was forced to retreat to the Ch'ongch'on River. US losses were 449 killed and ROKA losses were 530 killed. PVA losses were estimated at over 600 killed.

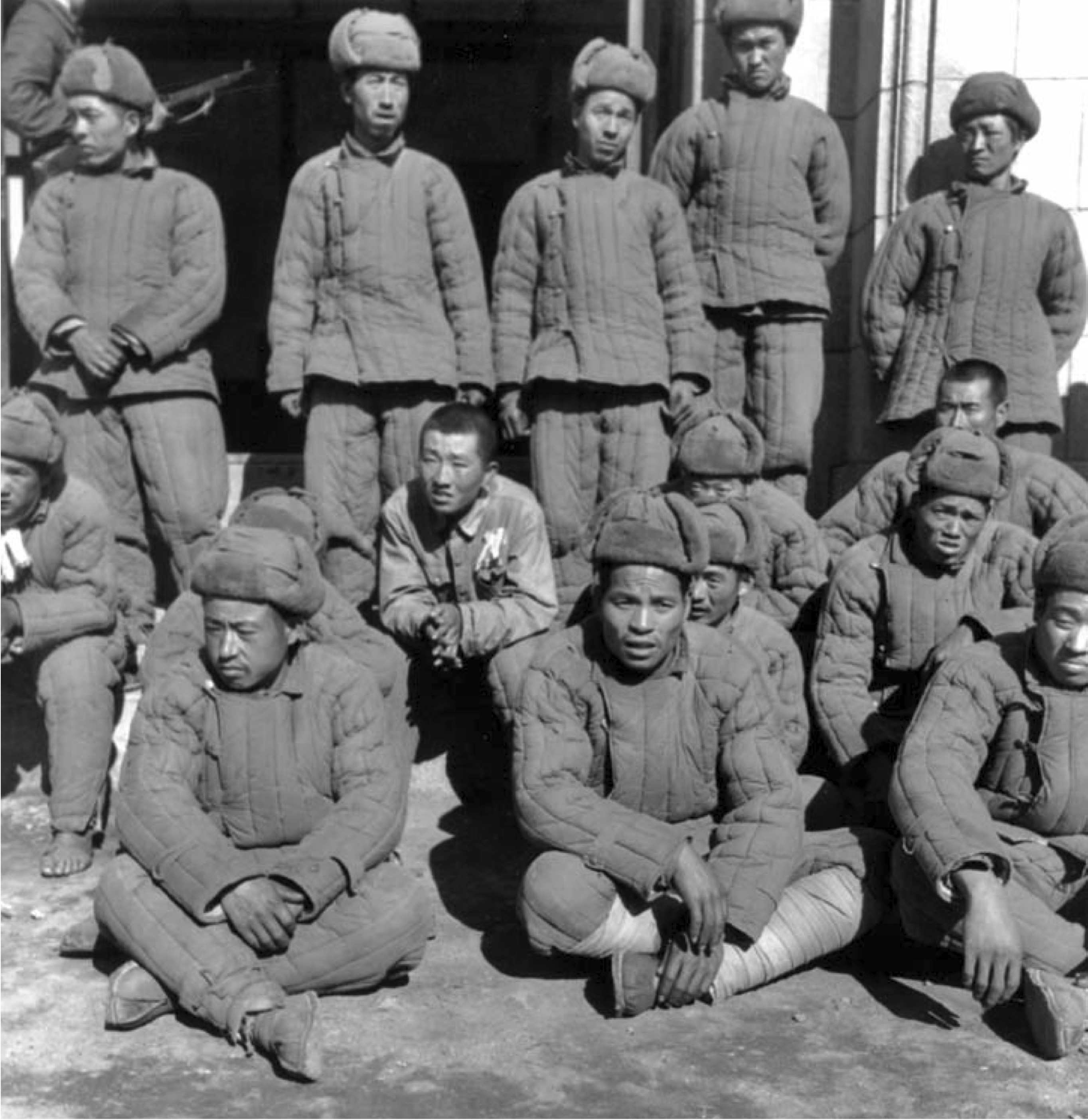
PVA prisoners from the 124th Division, 31 October

During the night of 4–5 November, the PVA mounted a full-scale assault on the US 24th Infantry Division, pushing back the 19th Infantry Regiment nearly 2 kilometres. The PVA subsequently turned west, advancing between the Taeryong and Chongchon rivers and threatening the rear of the 27th Commonwealth Brigade by cutting the Pakchon–Sinanju road. On 5 November the PVA attacked C Battery, 61st Field Artillery Battalion which was guarding a bridge near Kujin. The Commonwealth Brigade then successfully counterattacked the Chinese forces occupying a number of nearby ridgelines during the day but were in turn counter-attacked before being pushed off the high ground during the night. Following heavy fighting, the assault unexpectedly ceased after midnight and the PVA were observed beginning to withdraw. Commonwealth losses were 14 killed and PVA losses were 270 killed.

On 4 November PVA forces drove hard for Kunu-ri. Hill 622, a large mountain cresting 5 km (3 mi) northeast of Kunu-ri, dominated the town, the valley of the Ch'ongch'on, and the rail and highway communication lines passing along it. The 3rd and 5th Regiments of the ROKA 7th Division held this key terrain feature, with the US 5th Regimental Combat Team, 24th Division, in blocking position just behind them. The ROKA 8th Regiment was in reserve along the road east of Kunu-ri. That morning a strong PVA attack broke the ROKA 3rd Regiment position on the mountain and ROKA soldiers began streaming back through the 5th RCT. The commanding officer of C Company stopped and reorganized these ROKA troops and sent them back to retake the hill. The ROKA 8th Regiment was now also committed to the battle. The hill changed hands several times throughout the day, but at dark ROKA troops held its vital northwest ridge. The 5th RCT itself had heavy fighting in this battle to hold Kunu-ri, and was forced to withdraw about 900 m (1,000 yd). Part of the fighting was at close quarters. By evening the PVA attack in estimated division strength (elements of the CCF 38th Army) had been repulsed. The ROKA 7th Division and 5th Regimental Combat Team had saved Kunu-ri and successfully protected the right flank of Eighth Army.

Simultaneously with this attack south of the Ch'ongch'on against Kunu-ri, the PVA struck the bridgehead force north of the river. On 4 November both ground and aerial observers reported approximately 1,000 enemy soldiers crossing the Kuryong River 3 km (2 mi) northwest of the 1st Battalion, 19th Infantry, and moving south through wooded terrain, evidently intent on getting into the rear of the battalion. The enemy maneuver succeeded. PVA troops captured the battalion's radio while the operator was using it to report the situation to the regimental headquarters. The battalion did not make much of a fight, and, after destroying and abandoning its heavy equipment and vehicles, it withdrew eastward and infiltrated across the Kuryong and Ch'ongch'on Rivers to friendly positions. Nearly all the men escaped. Meanwhile, a task force of the 3rd Battalion, 19th Infantry, subsequently reinforced by the entire battalion, tried to drive through to the 1st Battalion's position, but strong PVA forces on the road repelled it. With these difficulties developing in the bridgehead area, Church ordered Brigadier general Garrison H. Davidson, the assistant division commander of the 24th Division, to assume command of all 24th Division troops north of the Ch'ongch'on and to co-ordinate the actions of the 27th Commonwealth Brigade and the division troops. Davidson arrived at the 19th Infantry command post shortly after noon on the 4th to assume command of Task Force Davidson. The worsening situation caused Church at 16:30 also to order the 21st Infantry Regiment to cross to the north side of the Ch'ongch'on River during the night and attack the next day, to clear the PVA from the 19th Infantry area and restore the bridgehead line. A PVA force made a further penetration in the 19th Infantry zone during the night, but the next morning, 5 November, the 2nd and 3rd Battalions, 21st Infantry, attacked and restored the position. Fleeing the battle area, hordes of refugees crossed the Ch'ongch'on; 20,000 of them passed through the checking points on the south side of the river on 4–5 November.

On the west, there was an 8-kilometre (5 mi) gap between the left flank of the 19th Infantry bridgehead position and the 27th Commonwealth Brigade position. A large mountain mass lay in this no man's land, and over and through it PVA forces could move at will to the flank and rear of either the 27th Brigade or the 19th Infantry. On the 19th Infantry's extreme left flank at the edge of this gap the 2nd Battalion held Hill 123 which overlooked a valley near the little village of Ch'onghyon, 6 km (4 mi) above the Ch'ongch'on. On the night of 5–6 November the PVA made a coordinated attack all along the bridgehead line. At Hill 123 the attack achieved surprise against E and G Companies, 19th Infantry. At least part of the PVA assault force came up to E Company's position from the rear, apparently following field telephone wire. The PVA caught many men asleep in their sleeping bags and killed them where they lay, others were shot in the back of the head. The PVA virtually overran the battalion positions on Hill 123. Corporal Mitchell Red Cloud Jr. gave the first alarm to E Company from his position on the point of the ridge where a trail climbed to the company command post. A group of PVA suddenly charged him from a brush-covered area 30 m (100 ft) away. Red Cloud sprang to his feet and fired his BAR into them. PVA fire wounded and felled him, but he pulled himself to his feet, wrapped one arm around a small tree, and again delivered point-blank BAR fire until he was killed. Red Cloud was posthumously awarded the Medal of Honor for his actions. By 03:00 the battalion had withdrawn 1,000 yards. There it was only barely able to hold its new position. After daylight the PVA withdrew from contact with the 2nd Battalion. Elsewhere the other battalions on the 19th Infantry front repulsed the attacks on them after hard fighting. Artillery firing from the south side of the Ch'ongch'on supported the 19th Infantry during the bridgehead battles.

After daylight the re-equipped 1st Battalion, 19th Infantry, which had re-crossed to the north side of the Ch'ongch'on during the night, counterattacked and closed the gap between the 2nd Battalion and the rest of the regiment on its right. The 19th Regiment then began restoring its original bridgehead line. In these night battles of predawn 6 November the PVA had suffered heavy losses. On 8 November the 2nd Battalion alone counted 474 PVA dead in the vicinity of Hill 123, and it found evidence that many more dead had been buried. The 3rd Battalion, 19th Infantry, counted more than 100 PVA dead. Interrogation of prisoners disclosed that the PVA 355th Regiment, 119th Division; the 358th Regiment, 120th Division; and a KPA regiment had attacked the 19th Infantry on the east side of the bridgehead.

By 6 November logistics difficulties forced the Chinese to end the First Phase Campaign and their forces were observed withdrawing northwards.

=== ROKA I Corps advances towards the Chosin Reservoir (24–30 October) ===
ROKA I Corps had attacked north from the Hamhung area, the 3rd Division north toward the Chosin Reservoir and the Capital Division northeast up the coastal road. The 26th Regiment led the advance for the ROKA 3rd Division. On the morning of 25 October two battalions of the regiment approached the first and second hydroelectric plants of the Chosin Reservoir area, about 50 km (30 mi) inland from Hungnam, and halfway to the reservoir itself. A message from Major Malcolm Smith, KMAG adviser with the regiment, to Colonel Emmerich that evening informed him that the regiment had captured a prisoner definitely identified as a Chinese soldier who said he belonged to the 5th Regiment of the 8th Army. This prisoner said there were 4,000 to 5,000 Chinese in the immediate vicinity. During the next two days, the 26th Regiment moved ahead very slowly against increasing resistance. On the morning of 28 October the ROKA attacked in the vicinity of Sudong in what proved to be a very costly action and suffered heavy casualties. ROKA patrols to the Sinhung-ni and Koto-ri areas brought back news that they had seen at both places what they believed to be Chinese soldiers. That day two PVA soldiers were captured 1.5 km (1 mi) west of Sudong. All day on the 29th small arms close combat continued in the large fields around the second hydroelectric plant. In the afternoon enemy 120mm fire increased. The ROKA troops at the same time began to show signs of demoralization as their supply of grenades ran low. In the fighting on this day, the ROKA captured 16 more PVA soldiers and learned from them that the 370th Regiment, 124th Division, 42nd Army, blocked the way north, with the rest of the division nearby. KPA tanks supported these Chinese. The PVA division and regimental headquarters reportedly were at Hagaru-ri at the southern end of the Reservoir. On the 30th, after a heavy battle with the Chinese, the 26th Regiment withdrew a short distance to a stronger defensive position. The capture of the sixteen PVA on the 29th was a considerable prize, and General Kim, the ROKA I Corps commander, telephoned the news to Almond.

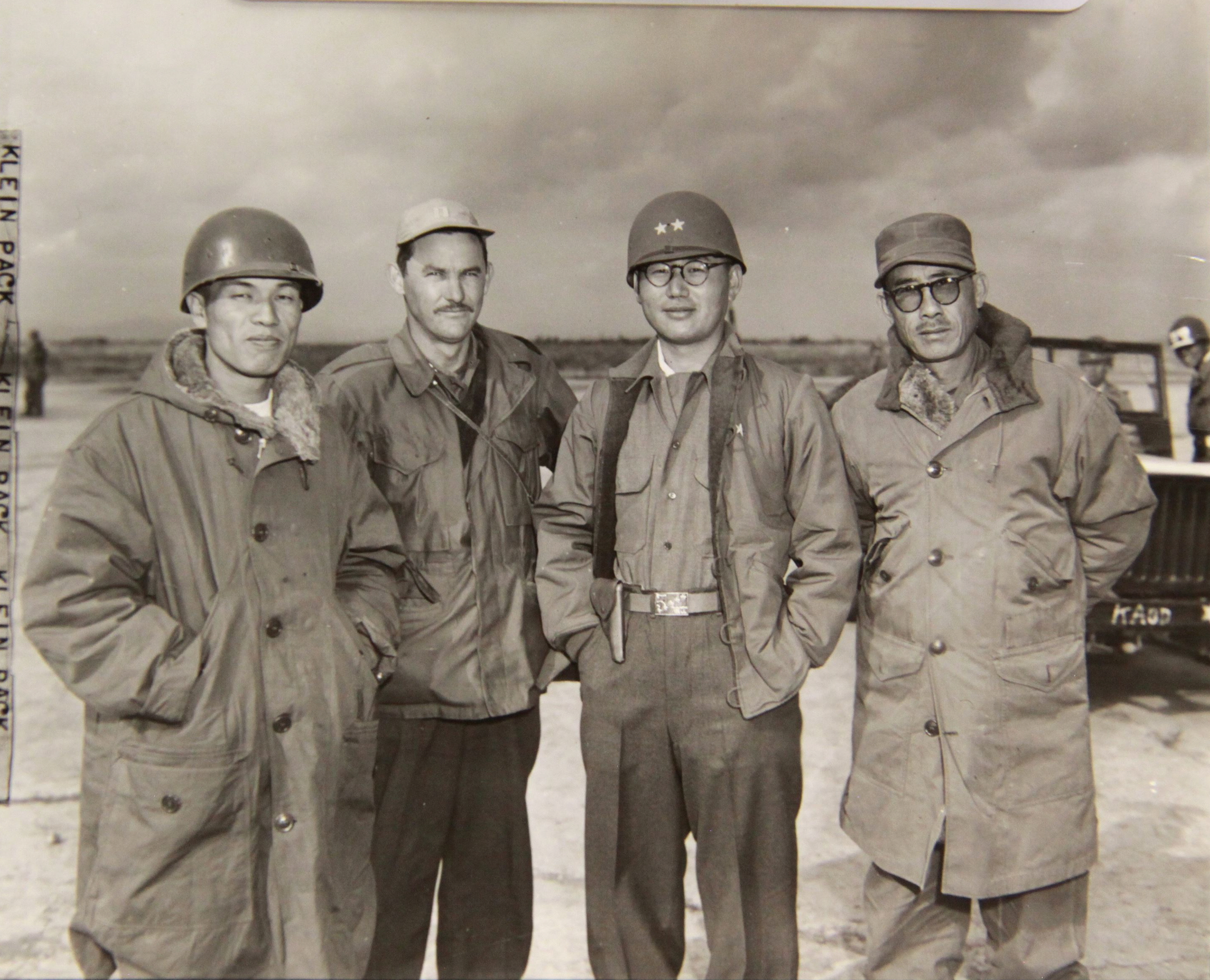
ROK 1st and 3rd Division commanders at Hamhung

On 30 October, Almond went to the ROKA I Corps command post at Hamhung and personally inspected the captives and interviewed them through an interpreter. The Chinese told him they had not eaten for three days. They said they had crossed the Yalu River at Manp'ojin on 16 October (later they said they had crossed on the 14th) and had marched from there on foot at night, their mortars being carried on packhorses and mules. Most of the 16 soldiers were members of the Mortar Company, 370th Regiment. At the time of their capture they said three of their four mortars had been destroyed and the fourth had been withdrawn. The men were well-clothed, healthy, and averaged 28 to 30 years in age. They asserted that their entire division had crossed into Korea and marched to the front. Most of the men in this division had been in Chiang Kai-shek's Nationalist Army, stationed near Beijing, until about a year earlier, they said. Their division had surrendered there to the Communists and was immediately taken into the PLA. Almond at once sent a personal radio message to MacArthur informing him of the presence of Chinese units in northeast Korea and giving such details as he had learned in the course of his interview with the prisoners.

The 370th Regiment apparently arrived at its positions near Sudong on 23 or 24 October and first encountered ROKA troops on the 25th. Behind it came the other two regiments of the 124th Division, the 371st and 372nd, one a few days behind the other. When Almond visited Kim again on 31 October, he learned that seven more PVA prisoners had been captured to make a total of 25 now in the X Corps zone. Some of them said a second PVA division was near the Chosin Reservoir. A search of enemy dead showed they carried no official identification, although a few had written their names and units in ink on the left inside of their blouses. These soldiers were armed mostly with Japanese rifles confiscated in Manchuria at the end of World War II. The greater part of their mortars, machine guns, and Thompson submachine guns were American-made, having been captured from the Nationalists. Having left its artillery behind because of the mountains, the 124th Division in the battle below the reservoir used nothing larger than 82 mm. mortars.

=== X Corps comes ashore (26–29 October) ===
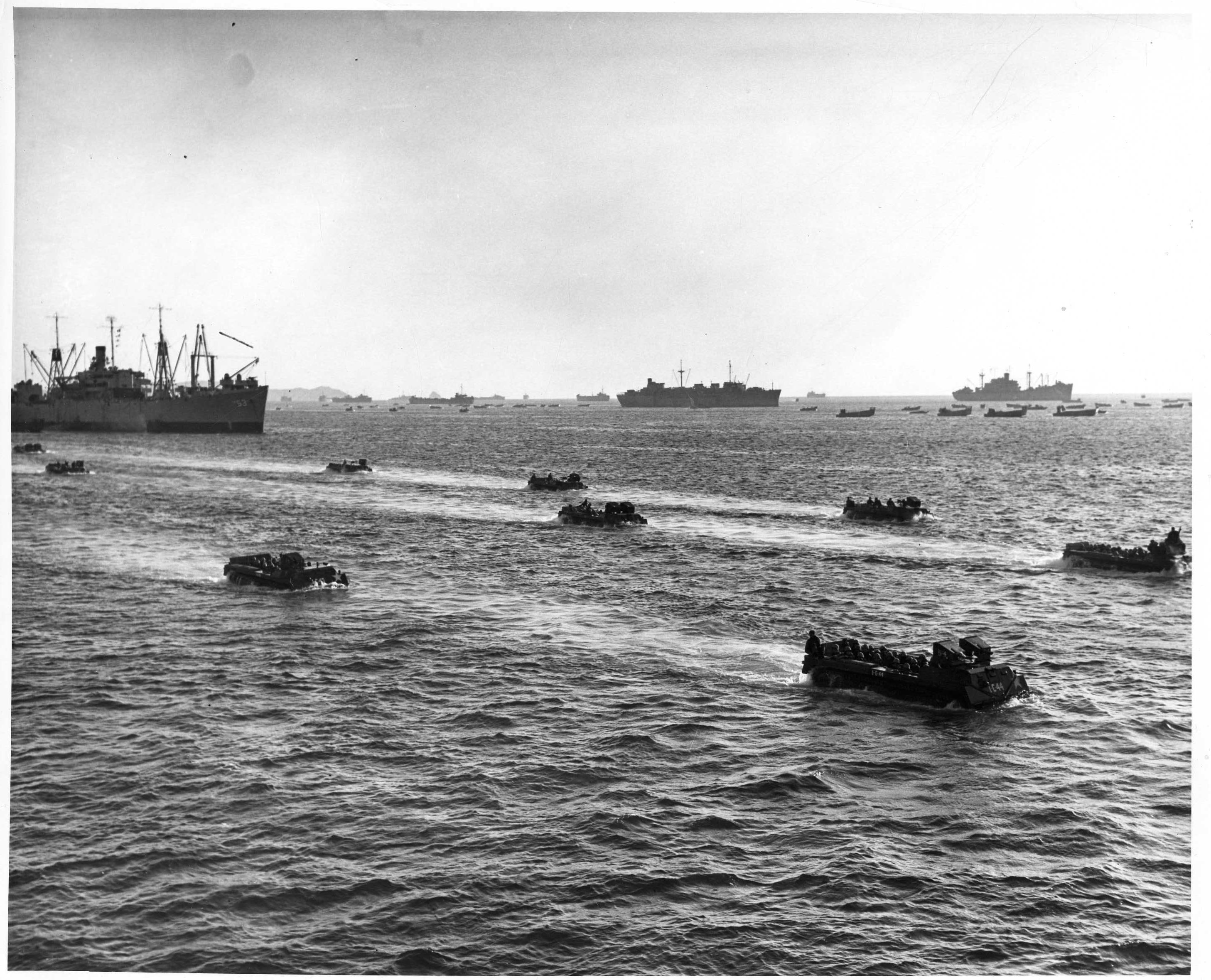
US Marines head ashore at Wonsan

After steaming back and forth from 19 to 25 October in the Sea of Japan just outside the Wonsan channel, it was a great relief to everyone afloat when 21 transports and 15 LSTs came into Wonsan harbor on 25 October and dropped anchor off Blue and Yellow Beaches. X Corps began a quiet, administrative landing at 07:30 on 26 October. At 10:00 27 October the command post of the 1st Marine Division closed aboard the USS Mount McKinley and opened in Wonsan. By the close of 28 October, all combat elements of the division were ashore. Meanwhile, the 7th Division had remained idly afloat at Pusan for ten days. Finally, on 27 October it received orders to proceed to Iwon, 241 km (150 mi) above Wonsan, and to unload there across the beaches. Because the X Corps mission by now had been changed to advancing northward instead of westward from Wonsan, Almond decided to land the 7th Division as close as possible to its axis of advance inland toward North Korea's northern border. This was to be the Pukch'ŏng-P'ungsan-Hyesan road to the Yalu. On receipt of the changed orders, the 17th Regimental Combat Team (17th RCT), which was to be first ashore, had to unload its unit equipment from its transports at Pusan and reload combat equipment onto LST, in order to be prepared to land on a possibly hostile beach. This done, seven LST with the 17th RCT aboard left Pusan on 27 October and headed up the coast for Iwon. The landing proved to be without danger for the minesweepers found no mines there, and the ROKA Capital Division had captured and passed through the town several days earlier. The 17th Infantry landed over the beaches at Iwon unopposed on the morning of the 29th. Except for most of its tanks, the 7th Division completed unloading there on 9 November.

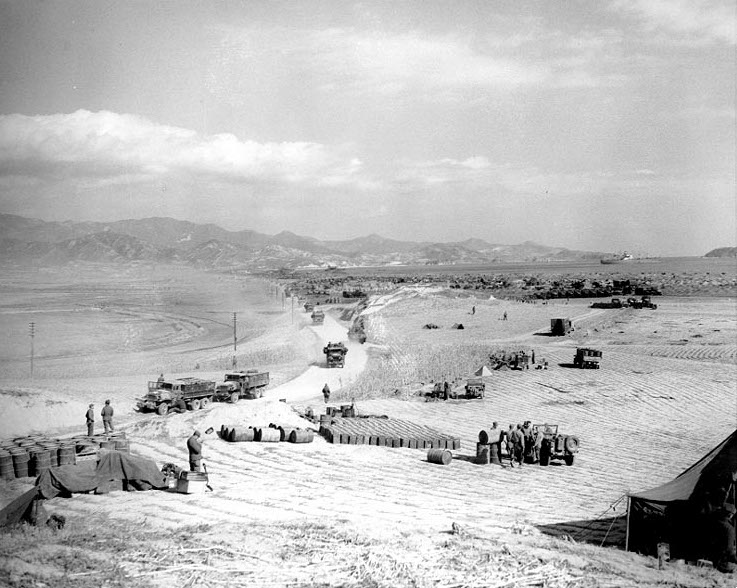
7th Infantry Division at Iwon

On 26 October Almond issued orders for his plan of operation. In its zone, the 1st Marine Division was split into three regimental combat teams: (1) the 1st Marine Regiment to relieve ROKA I Corps elements in the Kojo and Majonni areas south and west of Wonsan; (2) the 5th Marine Regiment was to secure the Wonsan area, the Yonpo Airfield south of Hungnam, and the X Corps west flank; and (3) the 7th Marine Regiment was to relieve the ROKA 3rd Division along the Hamhung-Chosin Reservoir corridor and to secure the power installations of the Chosin and Pujon Reservoirs (40.611°N 127.541°E).

X Corps' landings at Wonsan and Iwon were a strategic error diverting limited resources away from the pursuit of the KPA to pointless landings on territory already held by the ROKA. In addition, the split command with X Corps operating separately from Eighth Army violated US Army doctrine of unified command.

=== ROKA I Corps advances to the Manchurian border (26 October – 17 November) ===
Following the landing of US X Corps at Wonsan, the ROKA Capital Division, already north of Hungnam, continued its attack northward in three regimental combat teams. The Cavalry Regiment of the division, a motorized organization, constituted what Almond called the "flying column". It was to advance as rapidly as possible toward the border. Almond made arrangements for supplying this flying column from an LST at sea, and he provided it with a tactical air control party from the 7th Infantry Division. On 28 October, the Cavalry Regiment against strong opposition captured Songjin, 169 km (105 mi) northeast of Hungnam. At the same time, the 1st Regiment of the Capital Division approached P'ungsan, inland halfway to the border on the Iwon-Sinch'ang-ni- Hyesanjin road. Two days later the third regiment of the division, the 18th, reached the south end of Pujon Reservoir.

In front of the Cavalry Regiment on the coastal road an estimated KPA battalion retreated northward toward Kilchu, a sizable town 32 km (20 mi) north of Songjin, 23 km (14 mi) inland from the coast, the farthest point inland for a town of any size along the whole length of the east coastal road. Situated beyond the reach of effective naval gunfire, it was a favorable place for the North Koreans to fight a delaying action. The ROKA attack before daylight of 3 November developed into a day-long battle which failed to win the town. The ROKA 1st Regiment joined the Cavalry Regiment in the battle. By daylight of 5 November the two regiments had encircled Kilchu, and they captured it before noon. On the day of Kilchu's capture F4U Corsair air strikes from the 1st Marine Air Wing were credited with destroying two KPA tanks, four artillery pieces and 350 KPA dead. The next day a count of all the North Korean dead reached 530. In the Kilchu battle, the ROKA captured nine 45mm antitank guns, six 82mm mortars and ten heavy machine guns. The Cavalry Regiment lost 21 killed and 91 wounded. Prisoners said the KPA 507th Brigade had defended the town. The local North Korean commander reportedly ordered the execution of a battalion commander whose unit had retreated.

After the Kilchu battle, aerial reports indicated that fresh KPA troops were moving south along the coastal road from the Ch'ongjin-Nanam area. Supported by tanks, this force, estimated at six to seven battalions, met the Capital Division on 12 November just north of the Orang-ch'on, 48 km (30 mi) above Kilchu. In the resulting battle, it forced the ROKA 18th Regiment to withdraw south of the stream. Bad weather prevented effective close air support, and, since the scene of action was beyond the range of destroyers' guns, the heavy cruiser USS Rochester was sent to provide naval gunfire support. Clearing weather enabled Corsairs to join in the battle on the 13th, and that afternoon an air strike destroyed two tanks, damaged a third, and forced another to withdraw. Six inches of snow covered the Orang-ch'on battlefield. The KPA attack resumed and made further penetrations in the positions of the 18th Regiment on 14 November. The next day it compelled the 18th and the 1st Regiments to withdraw again. Close air support for the ROKA prevented the KPA from exploiting this success and during the day destroyed three more tanks, two self-propelled guns and 12 trucks. At the same time, 30 B-29's dropped 40,000 incendiary bombs on Hoeryong, a rail and road communication center of 45,000 population on the Tumen River at the Manchurian border, 161 km (100 mi) southwest of Vladivostok. By 16 November the four days of ground battle and three of aerial attack had so weakened the KPA force that it faltered, and the 18th Regiment once more advanced slowly. A delayed report covering the three days from the evening of 14 November to that of 17 November listed 1,753 KPA killed, 105 prisoners and the capture of four rapid-fire guns, 62 light machine guns, 101 submachine guns and 649 rifles. On the 19th, air attacks destroyed 2 more tanks and 2 artillery pieces. The USS Saint Paul now gave naval gunfire support to the ROKA. The KPA force that fought the battle of the Orangch'on consisted of about 6,000 troops of the KPA 507th Brigade and a regiment of the KPA 41st Division, supported by a battalion of eight tanks.

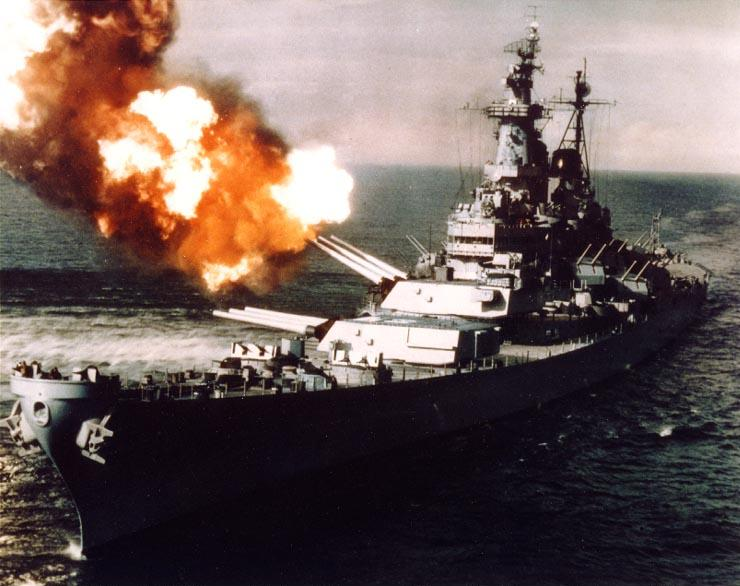
USS Missouri bombarding Ch'ongjin on 21 October

The ROKA troops fought these battles in northeast Korea under worsening weather conditions. On 16 November the temperature in their zone already had dropped to 16° below zero. By 17 November the ROKA 3rd Division had moved up behind the Capital Division on the coastal road and had started its 23rd Regiment inland from Songjin toward Hapsu. The next day its 22nd Regiment started for the same objective from farther north at Kilchu. The larger part of the 3rd Division, therefore, was now deployed on the left of and inland from the Capital Division. Six LST's of the Korean Navy supplied ROKA I Corps. Able at last to resume its advance after the battle of the preceding week, the Capital Division on 20 November crossed the Orang-ch'on and resumed its drive toward Ch'ongjin, the big industrial center 50 km (30 mi) north of the river and 105 km (65 mi) southwest of the Siberian border. A little more than a month earlier a naval task force had heavily bombarded Ch'ongjin with 1,309 rounds of 6-inch, 400 rounds of 8-inch, and 163 rounds of 16-inch shells. ROKA troops, following behind a rolling barrage of naval gunfire, enveloped Ch'ongjin on 25 November. That evening the 1st Regiment moved around the city to a point 8 km (5 mi) north of it; the Cavalry Regiment seized the airfield on its western edge; and the 18th Regiment was on its southern outskirts. The next day, Ch'ongjin fell to the Capital Division. The ROKA now planned to turn due north and inland along the highway and railroad leading to Hoeryong at the Manchurian border.

=== Battle of Chongju (29–30 October) ===
On 29 October 3 RAR took over as lead battalion of the 27th Commonwealth Brigade 6 kilometres from Chongju. As they approached Chongju, aerial reconnaissance reported a battalion-sized force of 500–600 KPA infantry supported by several tanks and at least two self-propelled guns, positioned on a thickly wooded ridgeline around Chongju. The Australians launched a series of company attacks with M4 Sherman tanks and aircraft in support. Despite heavy resistance, the KPA were forced to withdraw and the Australians captured their objectives after three hours of fighting. That evening the KPA counterattacked 3 RAR suffering serious casualties but failing to overrun their positions. On 30 October 3 RAR advanced to the high ground overlooking Chongju, killing and capturing a number of North Koreans in skirmishes. That afternoon the town itself was cleared by the remaining elements of the 27th Commonwealth Brigade without opposition. KPA losses were 162 killed and ten captured and 11 tanks and 2 self-propelled guns destroyed. Commonwealth losses were nine killed including 3 RAR commander Lt. Col. Charles Green.

=== US 7th Infantry Division advance to the Yalu River (29 October – 23 November) ===
Following the landing of the 17th Infantry Regiment at Iwon on 29 October, the US 7th Infantry Division began operations between ROKA I Corps to the north and the 1st Marine Division to the south. On 29 October the 1st Battalion, 17th Regiment; the 49th Field Artillery Battalion; and A Company, 13th Engineer Combat Battalion moved from the beachhead to Cho-ri, a distance of 80 km (50 mi). From Cho-ri the 7th Division was to strike north for the Manchurian border at Hyesanjin, 110 km (70 mi) away. But over the poor dirt road that twisted its way through the mountains and the Korean upland the distance was much greater. On 31 October the 1st Battalion and regimental headquarters moved on to P'ungsan, 190 km (120 mi) from the Iwon beaches and approximately halfway between the coast and Hyesanjin. The 1st Regiment of the ROKA Capital Division had cleared the road of KPA troops that far. When the 7th Division got all its elements ashore its total strength would exceed 26,600 men. The division on 1 November counted 18,837 men, almost full-strength, and to this were added 7,804 attached South Korean soldiers. The 7th Infantry Division had its initial action in northeast Korea on 1 November when the 1st Battalion, 17th Infantry, helped the ROKA 1st Regiment repulse a strong KPA attack 3 km (2 mi) north of P'ungsan. Colonel Herbert B. Powell, commander of the 17th Infantry Regiment, ordered an attack by the 1st Battalion the next morning at 08:00 to clear the KPA force from in front of the town. But the KPA in approximately regimental strength attacked first, at 07:00, starting an action that continued throughout the day. Except for one company, all units of the 17th Regiment arrived at P'ungsan by the end of the day. Powell's regiment now relieved the ROKA 1st Regiment, which turned back to join the Capital Division on the coastal road.

Because the open beaches were wholly at the mercy of the weather and high seas, unloading of the 7th Infantry Division at Iwon went forward slowly. The relatively few vehicles ashore, the long haul and the low stockpile on the beach combined to cause the 17th Infantry on 4 November to request an airdrop at P'ungsan of 4.2-inch (110 mm), 81 mm, and 60 mm mortar ammunition. An airdrop the next day had considerable breakage loss. Patrols on the 4th discovered the KPA had withdrawn from in front of P'ungsan, and the 17th Infantry advanced unopposed to the Ungi River. The temperature stood at 2° below zero. At the Iwon beachhead, the 3rd Battalion, 31st Infantry Regiment, landed on 3 November and the rest of the regiment followed ashore the next day. The regimental mission was to move to the left (west) flank of the 17th Infantry. This would place it in the mountainous country extending to the Pujon Reservoir. ROKA troops previously had advanced into that region. Carrying out its mission, the 31st Infantry Regiment advanced on the division left flank toward the reservoir. On 8 November it encountered Chinese soldiers on the eastern slopes of Paek-san, a 2,350 m (7,700 ft) peak 19 km (12 mi) east of the southern end of the reservoir. This was the 7th Division's first contact with the PVA. There, during the afternoon, elements of the regiment engaged in a battle with an estimated battalion of PVA, later identified as part of the 376th Regiment, 126th Division. Before nightfall, the 31st Infantry seized that part of Paek-san, and the PVA force withdrew with at least 50 killed. On this same day a patrol of the regiment met a Marine patrol about midway between Hamhung and the Pujon Reservoir, thus establishing the first contact between the two divisions in northeast Korea.

On the division right flank on 9 November, the 7th Reconnaissance Company moved to Sillyong, east of P'ungsan, to protect a power installation. On 12 November the division received orders from X Corps to continue the advance northward. The 17th Infantry was to seize Kapsan, and then go to Hyesanjin on the Yalu; the 31st Infantry was to advance on the left of the 17th; and the 32nd Infantry Regiment was to seize the southeast shore of the Pujon Reservoir. The 32nd Infantry, which began unloading on 4 November and was the last of the regiments to come ashore at Iwon, moved southwest from the beach along the coast through Hamhung and there turned northeast to Tangp'ang-ni in preparation for its part in the operation. In accordance with the Corps' order, the 17th Infantry prepared to attack across the Ungi River on 14 November. To replace the bridge which the North Koreans had blown, Powell had ROKA troops in the regiment construct a floating footbridge made of planking extending between empty oil drums. KPA fire on the bridge site was at long range and ineffective. The 2nd Battalion, 17th Infantry, crossed over this footbridge without difficulty on the 14th and proceeded to the attack. The 3rd Battalion was scheduled to cross the river at the same time over a shallow ford a few miles to the east. During the night of 13–14 November KPA forces apparently opened dams upstream. The water level rose 0.6 m (2 ft), making the river waist-deep. In the face of heavy small arms and some mortar fire, six men of L Company waded the stream in weather 7° below zero. A few other men entered the water, but it soon became apparent that all who crossed the stream would be frozen and out of action in a few minutes unless they were specially cared for. The battalion commander ordered the men who had crossed to the north side to return. Their clothes had to be cut from them. They were then wrapped in blankets and taken to the 3rd Battalion command post tent to warm. Casualties from this abortive crossing attempt were one killed, six wounded, and 18 men suffering frostbite from exposure in the river. Powell agreed with the battalion commander that the 3rd Battalion could not cross by wading the icy water. Both Generals Barr and Almond concurred in this decision. The battalion subsequently crossed over the oil drum footbridge. The need for shelters and warming areas for the front-line troops led the 7th Division the next day to request the immediate delivery of 250 squad tents and 500 oil-burning stoves. In order to keep vehicle gasoline lines and carburetors from freezing it was necessary to mix alcohol or alcohol-base antifreeze with gasoline. On 15 November, the 1st Battalion crossed the Ungi River behind the 2nd Battalion and moved up on its left, but the two battalions made only small gains. On the 16th, aerial observers reported the KPA forces separating into small groups and withdrawing toward Kapsan. That day the 17th Regiment gained about 13 km (8 mi). On the 19th, the 1st Battalion seized Kapsan at 10:30 after a co-ordinated infantry, tank and artillery attack. In this action the 17th Tank Company overran KPA troops in their foxholes, while the heavy fire of the 15th Anti-aircraft Artillery Battalion 40mm weapons drove other North Koreans from log-covered trenches and pillboxes and then cut them down. Under cover of the combined fire of the tanks and the antiaircraft weapons, the infantry then crossed the river. That night the 1st Battalion was 13 km (8 mi) north of Kapsan, only 37 km (23 mi) by road from Hyesanjin on the Yalu. The 2nd and 3rd Battalions followed behind the 1st Battalion. The regimental command post set up in Kapsan for the night. The next day, 20 November, the 17th Regiment in a column of battalions the 1st, 3rd, and 2nd in that order advanced on foot 31 km (19 mi) over icy roads through and over the mountains to a point only a few miles from the Yalu. Small KPA groups opposed the advance with only brief exchanges of fire and then fled. On the morning of 21 November, without opposition, the 1st Battalion, 17th Infantry, led the way into Hyesanjin, and by 10:00 had occupied the town and surrounding ground to the banks of the Yalu River. Almond had flown into Kapsan on the 20th and, together with Barr and Powell, accompanied the leading elements of the 17th Infantry Regiment into the town. A week earlier, on the 13th, Navy carrier planes had attacked the military camp at Hyesanjin, burning the barracks buildings and warehouses. The town was now about 85 percent destroyed by this and earlier aerial action.

The Yalu River at Hyesanjin is not the great river it becomes near its mouth at Sinuiju. At Hyesanjin, near its source on the southwest slopes of the 2,400-metre (8,000 ft) Nam P'otae-san, the Yalu was approximately 46–69 m (50–75 yd) wide. On the day the 17th Infantry first stood on its banks the river was frozen over except for a 1.8-metre-wide (6 ft) channel; four days later it was completely frozen over. The bridge across the stream at Hyesanjin had been destroyed before the 17th Infantry arrived there. Upstream about 0 km (300 yd) on the north side of the Yalu in Manchuria there was an undamaged Chinese village larger than Hyesanjin. Officers and men of the 17th Infantry had mixed emotions, some apprehensive, as they looked across the ribbon of ice and water into Manchuria. There they saw Chinese sentries walk their rounds and their officers come and go.

Meanwhile, to the southwest, the 31st Infantry Regiment patrolled extensively and advanced in its zone. This mountainous waste was virtually roadless, and ox-drawn carts were used to transport supplies and evacuate wounded. On 15 November a patrol from the 3rd Battalion, 31st Infantry, reached the eastern shore of Pujon Reservoir. The next day another patrol encountered about 200 PVA soldiers at the northern end of the reservoir and drove them away after a brief fight. On the 18th, patrols ranged both sides of the reservoir. Leaving strong detachments to guard the mountain passes from the reservoir eastward into the division's rear along the Cho-ri-P'ungsan road, Barr on 20 November began moving the bulk of the 31st and 32d Regiments to the P'ungsan-Kapsan area behind the 17th Infantry. On the division right, ROKA troops finally arrived at Sillyong shortly before midnight of the 20th to relieve I Company, 32nd Infantry. In the darkness, each group at first thought the other the enemy and a brief firefight resulted in the wounding of five ROKA's. The 32nd Infantry Regiment, concentrating now at Kapsan, prepared to strike northwest through Samsu to Sin'galp'ajin on the Yalu. This would put it on the Manchurian border to the left or west of the 17th Regiment at Hyesanjin. Task Force Kingston, commanded by 2nd Lieutenant Robert C. Kingston, a platoon leader of K Company, started for Samsu on 22 November and entered the town unopposed at midafternoon, followed later by the rest of the 3rd Battalion, less I Company.

The 17th Infantry at Hyesanjin was to co-operate with the 32nd Infantry by attacking west to meet it. On 22 November, the first day that it attempted to move west to join the 32nd Infantry, one of its patrols encountered a force of KPA about 11 km (7 mi) west of Hyesanjin, and a stubborn fight developed. This set a pattern of action that occupied the 17th Infantry during the next week, daily fights with small but stubborn enemy forces that blew bridges, cratered roads, all but immobilized the regiment, and kept it from making any appreciable gains. At the same time, in front of the 32nd Infantry, KPA forces fought effective delaying actions north of Samsu so that not until 28 November did Task Force Kingston, reinforced, reach Sin'galp'ajin.

The intense cold of northeast Korea in late November took its toll in frostbite casualties in the 7th Division. The worst to suffer was the 31st Infantry which operated in the remote mountain regions east of the Pujon Reservoir. A total of 142 men in the division were treated for frostbite up to 23 November; 83 of them were from the 31st Regiment. Of the 58 men evacuated because of frostbite, 33 were from that regiment.

=== US 3rd Infantry Division (5–25 November) ===
During November the US 3rd Infantry Division joined X Corps in Korea. The 65th Infantry Regiment was the first part of the 3rd Division to come ashore at Wonsan on 5–6 November. A division advance party opened the 3rd Division tactical command post at Wonsan on 10 November. The 15th Regimental Combat Team began unloading there on the 11th and the 7th Regimental Combat Team finished landing on 17 November. The 3rd Division's primary mission was to relieve all 1st Marine Division troops in the Wonsan area and south of Hamhung, to block the main roads in the southern part of the Corps' zone against guerrillas and bypassed KPA, and to protect the Wonsan-Hungnam coastal strip. The 3rd Division zone of responsibility measured approximately 145 by 55 km (90 by 35 mi), an area so large as to make centralized division control impracticable. Therefore, Robert H. Soule, the division commander, decided to establish four regimental combat teams (RCTs) and to assign sectors and missions to each. These were the 7th RCT supported by the 10th Field Artillery Battalion; the 15th RCT, supported by the 39th Field Artillery Battalion; the 65th RCT, supported by the 58th Armored Artillery Battalion (self-propelled guns) and C Company, 64th Heavy Tank Battalion; and the ROKA 26th Regiment, 3rd Division (attached to the US 3rd Division for operations), supported by A Battery, 96th Field Artillery Battalion. The 15th RCT had the mission of protecting Wonsan and the area south and west of the city, with the Wonsan- Majon-ni-Tongyang road the probable axis of major KPA activity. North of the 15th RCT, the 65th RCT was to hold the west-central part of the division zone, with the Yonghung-Hadongsan-ni lateral road the principal route into the regimental sector from the coast. The northern sector of the division zone, west of Hamhung, fell to the ROKA 26th Regiment; included among its missions was that of patrolling west to the Eighth Army-X Corps boundary. The 7th RCT was in 3rd Division reserve with the mission of securing the coastal area from Chung-dong, a point about 8 miles (13 km) north of Wonsan, to Hungnam. The 64th Heavy Tank Battalion was also in division reserve.

The 3rd Division did not engage in any major military operations, but beginning on 12 November it did have a number of engagements with KPA forces in ambushes and roadblocks along the regimental main supply routes, particularly in the sector of the 15th RCT west of Wonsan between Majon-ni and Tongyang. Several of these were serious and resulted in heavy losses of men and equipment. They grew progressively worse toward the end of November; apparently the KPA actions were co-ordinated with Chinese intervention in the reservoir area of northeast Korea.

=== 1st Marine Division in the Chosin Reservoir (29 October – 25 November) ===
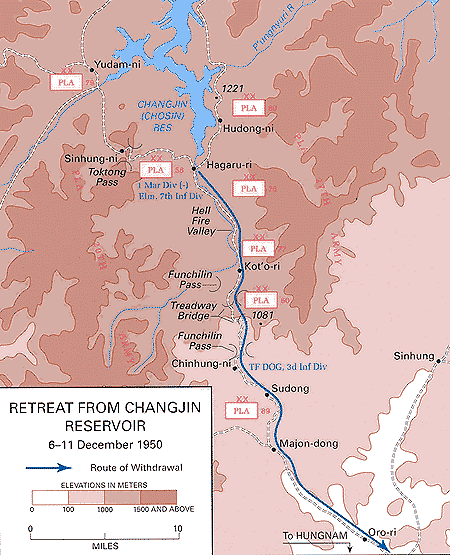
Map of the Chosin Reservoir area

While the ROKA I Corps and the US 7th Infantry Division advanced toward the northeast border of Korea against scattered and ineffective KPA opposition, the 1st Marine Division began moving up its assigned axis of advance toward the Chosin Reservoir to the southwest of them. Unknown to them was that the PVA was preparing a trap for the Marines by sending strong forces behind them, all along the single road leading up to the Chosin Reservoir to cut them off. At 07:30 on 29 October, the 1st Battalion, 7th Marines, began loading into trucks at Wonsan and an hour later it started on the 134-kilometre (83 mi) trip to Hamhung. The next day X Corps ordered the 1st Marine Division to relieve ROKA I Corps in the reservoir area. At the end of the month, the 7th Marine Regiment was in an assembly area north of Hamhung and the 5th Marine Regiment was en route there from Wonsan. From Hamhung to the southern tip of the Chosin Reservoir the road climbs for 90 km (56 mi). For slightly more than half the distance, to Chinhung-ni, the climb was easy and gradual over a two-lane road. From there a one-lane dirt road zigzagged up precipitous slopes to the 1,200-metre-high (4,000 ft) plateau lying just south of the reservoir. In an air-line distance of 6 km (4 mi) and a road distance of 13 km (8 mi) north of Chinhung-ni, the road climbs 760 m (2,500 ft) in elevation to the rim of the plateau, 4 km (2 1/2 mi) south of Kot'o-ri (40.284°N 127.3°E). A narrow-gauge railroad paralleled the road from Hamhung to Chinhung-ni, but from that point to the top of the plateau a cable car incline replaced it. Once on top of the plateau, the railroad track continued north to Hagaru-ri (now Changjin-ŭp) (40.3838°N 127.249°E) and the Chosin Reservoir. There were four mountain power plants on the road to the reservoir. 6 miles (9.7 km) by road below Chinhung-ni is the village of Sudong (40.17°N 127.324°E). There, just below the steep climb to the plateau, the PVA 124th Division held its blocking position. Five km (3 mi) south of Sudong the road, climbing northward, crosses from the west to the east side of a mountain stream. The bridge at this crossing was of importance; if it were destroyed the UN forces north and south of it would be separated and those on the north cut off from their source of supply. Hill 698 dominated this bridge from the west, as did Hill 534 from the east. These two hills were critical terrain features.

Early on 1 November the 7th Marines boarded trucks at its Hamhung assembly area and, together with its attached artillery, the 2nd Battalion, 11th Marines, it moved north 42 km (26 mi) by road to defensive positions behind the ROKA 26th Regiment, 5 km (3 mi) below Chosin Power Plant 3. The ROKA troops had fallen back more than 8 km (5 mi) since they first met the PVA. At 10:30 on 2 November, the 7th Marines relieved the ROKA 26th Regiment in its position and the 1st Battalion, followed by the 2nd Battalion, attacked north. By noon it had confirmed that PVA troops opposed it, and during the day captured three of them one from the 370th Regiment and two from the 372nd. At 16:30 the 1st Battalion began to prepare night defensive positions about 1.5 km (1 mi) south of Sudong. The 2nd Battalion, nearly 1.5 km (1 mi) behind the 1st Battalion, meanwhile had engaged in a hard struggle for Hill 698 west of the road. 5 km (3 mi) behind the 2nd Battalion the Regimental headquarters and the 3rd Battalion were at the Majon-dong road fork. Shortly after midnight the PVA launched a co-ordinated attack, calculated to separate the 1st and 2nd Battalions from each other and from the regiment behind them. The PVA infantry cut in between the 1st and 2nd Battalions and almost overran the 4.2-inch mortar company in position along the road. Fighting was close and at grenade range for both battalions. In the course of the battle the PVA gained a position dominating the crucial bridge in the 2nd Battalion area. With the coming of daylight, Marine aircraft went into action, repeatedly attacking the Chinese and eventually forcing them from their roadblock positions. Sandbagged trucks successfully brought 66 wounded Marines through PVA small arms fire to the rear. During the day combined ground and air action killed about 700 PVA soldiers. Identification on the dead showed that nearly all of them were members of the 370th Regiment.

After the heavy battle on the 3rd, the PVA apparently withdrew, for the Marines encountered only light opposition on the 4th as they entered and passed through Sudong and continued on to the higher ground around Chinhung-ni. At Samgo railroad station, just north of Chinhung-ni, the Marines destroyed the last four tanks of the KPA 344th Tank Regiment. Less than 1.5 km (1 mi) beyond Chinhung-ni the steep climb began through the Funchilin Pass (40.204°N 127.3°E) to the Kot'o-ri plateau. The Marines could see enemy troops on the heights flanking the road at the pass. Farther north, according to aerial observers, an estimated 400 soldiers and three tanks were moving south from the Chosin Reservoir. Strafing reportedly caused heavy casualties in this column. A critical terrain feature, Hill 750, or How Hill as it came to be called, 2.5 km (1 1/2 mi) beyond Chinhung-ni, dominated the road where it made a hairpin loop of 900 m (1,000 yd) eastward in starting the climb. This hill was, in fact, the southern knob of a long finger ridge that extended southward from the rim of the Kot'o-ri plateau, on the east side of the road. On 5 November the 3rd Battalion moved through the 1st Battalion to start the attack up the pass. From How Hill the PVA stopped its advance. A map taken from a dead PVA officer showed that reinforced battalions on either side of the road were holding the high ground. Marine aircraft repeatedly attacked How Hill but failed to force the PVA from their positions. The Marines had to take How Hill before they could advance farther. The next day H Company made a long flanking march to approach the hill from the southeast. At 16:00 on 6 November, H Company reached the position from which it was to make its assault. After half an hour of air strikes and an artillery preparation, two platoons started for the top. Four times the PVA drove them back. When darkness fell the PVA still held the hill, and H Company withdrew. All night artillery and mortars pounded How Hill, the 81 mm mortars firing 1,800 rounds. Meanwhile, west of the road a Marine force had seized Hill 611 without difficulty. A prisoner taken there supplied the second report X Corps had received that two more PVA units, the 125th and 126th Divisions, were in the reservoir area. The next morning, patrols from the 3rd Battalion found that the PVA had withdrawn from the heights behind Chinhung-ni, including How Hill leaving behind many dead and some wounded. Information gained later from prisoners disclosed that the artillery and mortar barrage against How Hill during the night had caused crippling casualties in the 372nd Regiment (possibly the 371st) of the 124th Division while it was moving up to reinforce the line. These losses had caused the PVA to withdraw. On the afternoon of 7 November the 3rd Battalion moved ahead and reached the village of Pohujang and Power Plant 1. During the Marines' six days of battle with the PVA 124th Division the 1st Marine Air Wing had inflicted great numbers of casualties on the Chinese. But according to prisoners, the supporting artillery and mortars had taken an even greater toll. After 7 November the PVA 124th Division reportedly was down to a strength of about 3,000 men. Except for its stragglers, the 124th Division did not again enter the fighting in the reservoir area. Thus far the action against the PVA 124th Division from 2 through 7 November had cost the 7th Marines 46 men killed, 262 wounded, and 6 missing in action.

For two days after reaching Power Plant 1, the 7th Marines sent out patrols which failed to contact the PVA. On 10 November the regiment moved up over the pass without opposition and occupied Kot'o-ri. Only 11 km (7 mi) now separated it from Hagaru-ri. In its fight to reach the Kot'o-ri plateau the 7th Marines had captured 58 Chinese prisoners, 54 of them from the 124th Division and four from the 126th Division. It had taken its first prisoner from the 126th Division on 7 November.

During this time a controversy between Almond and General Partridge over the control of the 1st Marine Air Wing came to a head. Under existing procedure the Fifth Air Force Joint Operations Center at Seoul controlled the assignment of missions to the 1st Marine Air Wing. Almond felt that, during a period of active ground combat when the local ground tactical situation could change drastically within an hour or two, he, the local commander, should have complete command over the air units supporting the ground troops. On 4 November Partridge flew to Wonsan to hold a conference with Almond on the subject. Almond won his point; the Fifth Air Force ordered the 1st Marine Air Wing to assume direct responsibility for close support of X Corps without reference to the Joint Operations Center. Close support requests beyond the capabilities of the 1st Marine Air Wing were to be reported to the Fifth Air Force.

On the Kot'o-ri plateau, during the afternoon and night of 10–11 November the temperature dropped 40 degrees to 8° below zero and with it came a wind of 50–55 km/h (30–35 mph) velocity. The weather later became colder, with the temperature dropping to from 20° to 25° below zero. During the succeeding three or four days more than 200 men of the regiment collapsed from severe cold and were placed in sick bays for medical treatment. Stimulants had to be used to accelerate depressed respiration. Water-soluble medicines froze, and morphine could be maintained in satisfactory condition only when kept against the body. Plasma could be used only after a 60-90-minute preparation in a warm tent.

After the 7th Marines reached the Kot'o-ri plateau on 10 November, neither Colonel Litzenberg, the regimental commander, nor General Smith, the division commander, showed any inclination to hurry the advance. Smith plainly indicated that he was apprehensive about his western exposed flank, that he wanted to improve the road up the pass from the division railhead at Chinhung-ni, that he wanted to develop a secure base at Hagaru-ri, and that he wanted to garrison key points on the main supply road back south and most of all he wanted to concentrate the full strength of the Marine division in the Hagaru-ri area before trying to advance further toward the Yalu.

Winter struck early in the Chosin Reservoir area in 1950. It arrived with violent force and subzero temperatures on 10 November, the day the Marines reached the Kot'o-ri plateau. From that day on the troops there were involved in a winter campaign. Patrols sent out from Kot'o-ri on 11 and 12 November found only small scattered PVA groups in the hills, and the next day a Marine unit advanced to Pusong-ni, halfway to the reservoir. On 14 November the 7th Marines, wearing their heavy arctic parkas, trudged in subzero weather toward Hagaru-ri over a road now covered with an inch of snow. Vehicles froze up on the move and the men themselves had difficulty in moving forward. Entering Hagaru-ri, the Marines found it burned out by previous bombing attacks and practically deserted. Locals told them that the 3,000 PVA soldiers occupying the town had departed three days earlier, going north and west. A PVA soldier from the 377th Regiment, 126th Division, captured near Hagaru-ri during the day, said elements of his division were east of the reservoir. That night, 14–15 November, the temperature dropped to 15 degrees below zero. The next day the 7th Marines completed its movement into Hagaru-ri, and Litzenberg made arrangements for a perimeter defense. The 1st Battalion protected the northwest approaches, the 2nd Battalion the southern and the 3rd Battalion the northeast approaches to the town. That same day the 2nd Battalion, 5th Marines, arrived at Kot'o-ri, beginning the concentration of the rest of the 1st Marine Division in the Chosin Reservoir area behind the 7th Marines. The 5th Marines now guarded the main supply route back to Hamhung. Two days after the first Marine units entered Hagaru-ri, Smith and Majpr general Field Harris, Commanding General, 1st Marine Air Wing, on 16 November looked over the ground there and selected the site for a C-47 airstrip. Smith felt that such an airstrip would be needed to supplement supply by road and for fast evacuation of casualties. Engineer troops began work on the airstrip on 19 November, and others continued work on improving the road up the pass from Chinhung-ni. The first trucks climbed through the pass to Hagaru-ri on the 18th. Smith held the Marine advance to Hagaru-ri while this work continued. Thus it was, that with virtually no PVA opposition, the Marines advanced at an average rate of only a mile a day between 10 and 23 November. But this caution on the part of Smith in concentrating the division and his insistence on securing its supply lines and of establishing a base for further operations in the frigid, barren wastes of the Chosin Reservoir area were to prove the division's salvation in the weeks ahead.

=== The gap between Eighth Army and X Corps ===
By mid-November in northeast Korea, forces under X Corps command were far to the north, and in some places stood at the northern boundary of the country. In west and central North Korea the forces under Eighth Army command were far south of these latitudes. A line drawn due east from the Eighth Army front after the battle to hold the Ch'ongch'on River bridgehead in early November would cross the X Corps rear areas far behind the Corps front. Not only was the X Corps front far north of Eighth Army's, but it was also separated from it by a wide lateral gap. Virtually all of North Korea west or northwest of the X Corps front in November was in KPA/PVA hands. This great gap, seldom penetrated even by army or corps patrols, extended a minimum distance of 32 km (20 mi) from the northernmost right flank positions of Eighth Army to the nearest left flank positions of X Corps. Farther south the gap was greater, being about 55 km (35 mi) on a line east of Pyongyang and west of Wonsan. This was the distance after the Korean Marine Corps 3rd Battalion established its blocking position at Tongyang on 14 November; before that the distance was about 80 km (50 mi) when the X Corps' westernmost position was at Majon-ni. The road-mile distances of this gap over exceedingly bad mountain trails, they hardly could be called roads, were far greater. Accordingly, physical contact between the two commands would have to be made in the southern part of the X Corps zone if it was to be accomplished at all. This wide gap between the two major tactical organizations of the UN Command in Korea caused great concern to Eighth Army and some to the JCS in Washington; but less concern in X Corps, and very little, apparently, to MacArthur. He believed that the mountainous backbone of North Korea was so destitute of roads and usable means of communication that it would be impossible for the UN forces to maintain a continuous line across the peninsula that far north, and that the enemy would be unable to use this mountainous spine for effective military operations. Indeed, it seems quite clear that it was principally because of this forbidding terrain and the lack of lateral communications between the western and eastern parts of North Korea that MacArthur established the two separate commands in North Korea.

While MacArthur never expected solid and continuous physical contact between Eighth Army and X Corps in North Korea, he did expect communication and coordination between them by radio and personal liaison to the extent possible. There was radio communication between the two commands, and there was a daily trip by air of a liaison officer from X Corps to Eighth Army and back. As early as 25 October, before X Corps troops had landed on the east coast, arrangements had been made by the Fifth Air Force Joint Operations Center for two reconnaissance flights daily between ROKA II Corps right flank and X Corps left flank, which were to report on front lines and enemy concentrations. The two commands made many attempts to establish physical contact between them by means of patrols scheduled to meet at designated points along the Eighth Army-X Corps boundary. The first of these efforts was made on 6 November when the 2nd Infantry Division of Eighth Army sent a reinforced patrol from K Company, 23rd Infantry Regiment, to the designated point (the village of Songsin-ni) on the boundary 8 km (5 mi) east of Yangdok. The patrol reached this point the next day but there were no elements of the X Corps there to meet it. At Yangdok the patrol found and destroyed 16 boxcars of 120 mm, 80 mm and 47 mm ammunition; 6 self-propelled guns; 16 47 mm antitank guns; 30 57 mm antitank guns; 1 120 mm mortar; 3 heavy machine guns; and 3 antitank rifles. X Corps sent a radio message to Eighth Army saying that Marines from the 3rd Battalion, 1st Marines, at Majon-ni, 50 km (30 mi) to the east, could not meet the Eighth Army patrol because of the distance and intensive guerrilla action in the area to be traversed. It suggested other contact points on roads to the north at Hadongsan-ni and at Sach'ang-ni. Upon receiving this message Eighth Army withdrew the 23rd Infantry patrol and prepared to send another one from the 38th Infantry Regiment, 2nd Division, to Hadongsan-ni on the next lateral road northward. Almond meanwhile had ordered Colonel Harris, commanding officer of the 65th Infantry Regiment, 3rd Division, to place one battalion near the boundary to establish contact there with elements of Eighth Army. For this purpose the 1st Battalion, 65th Infantry Regiment, on 10 November after some delay rolled west and established its patrol base at Kwangch'on, about 6 km (4 mi) from the boundary, but double that in road miles. On 9 November IX Corps had ordered the 38th Infantry to send a patrol to Hadongsan-ni. But the patrol of the 2nd Reconnaissance Company which tried to reach that point was turned back by craters and boulders in the road. The next day patrols discovered all roads leading east from the 38th Infantry area were cratered or blocked by boulders. From the X Corps zone a patrol of the 65th Infantry went to the boundary on 11 November, and the next day it went 3 km (2 mi) beyond its boundary without meeting a patrol from Eighth Army. On the 12th the pilot of a liaison plane working with the patrol discovered a ROKA force westward and dropped a message to it arranging a meeting for the next day. On the 13th, however, even though it went 14 km (9 mi) beyond the boundary to a point where the road became impassable, the 65th Infantry patrol failed to meet an Eighth Army patrol. Eighth Army had tried to keep the rendezvous at Hadongsan-ni, but its strong motorized patrol built around E Company, 38th Infantry, was stopped by road craters 16 km (10 mi) east of Maengsan. All the mountain roads and trails leading eastward from this area were examined by 38th Infantry patrols but none were found that would permit passage of motorized vehicles. Some of the craters were about 4.5 m (15 ft) deep and 10.5 m (35 ft) in diameter. Although work was started on a bypass it appears that it was never completed.

While the 38th Infantry patrol failed to get through to the contact point on the 14th, on the 13th an Eighth Army liaison plane dropped two messages to the X Corps patrol saying that a patrol from the ROKA 10th Regiment, 8th Division, was working its way to the contact point along a different route. On 14 November at 10:00 the two patrols, a platoon from the 2nd Battalion, 10th Regiment, 8th Division, and a patrol from the 1st Battalion, 65th Infantry, did meet near the village of Songha-dong just west of the boundary. The ROKA patrol had come on foot from its patrol base at Maengsan, 70 km (45 mi) to the west. En route it had encountered an estimated total of 400 KPA guerrillas and had fought several minor engagements. The round trip of the ROKA patrol to the boundary and back to its base took ten days. This should explain why there were not daily meetings between Eighth Army and X Corps patrols at the boundary contact point. On 18 November, just before noon, a patrol from the 3rd Battalion, 38th Infantry, reportedly reached Hadongsan-ni on the boundary where it found a blown bridge which it could not bypass. There were no patrols there at that time from the 65th Infantry in the X Corps zone. Only once, therefore, on 14 November, did patrols from the Eighth Army, ROKA II Corps and the X Corps make physical contact with each other at the army-corps boundary.

=== The Home by Christmas offensive (24–25 November) ===
==== Planning ====
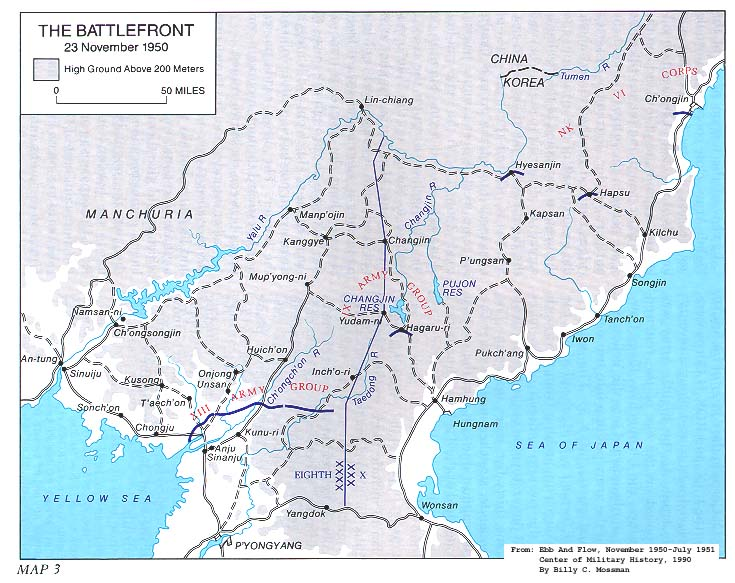
Korean front line 23 November 1950

On 6 November, MacArthur took official notice of the recent PVA offensive and summed up his estimate of the changing situation in Korea. He said the defeat of the North Koreans had been decisive when the Chinese intervened in "one of the most offensive acts of international lawlessness of historic record". He said the possible trap "surreptitiously laid calculated to encompass the destruction of the United Nations Forces" was avoided, "with minimum losses only by the timely detection and skillful maneuvering of the United States commander responsible for that sector". MacArthur announced his future intentions: "Our present mission is limited to the destruction of those forces now arrayed against us in North Korea with a view to achieving the United Nations' objective to bring unity and peace to the Korean nation and its people." He intended, obviously, to destroy the Chinese forces in Korea as well as the remaining North Koreans. To accomplish this he considered it necessary to establish an integrated continuous front in western and central Korea for co-ordinated large-scale offensive action. On that day Walker issued Eighth Army's operation plan for a renewal of the offensive. It called for an advance to the Korean border with three Corps abreast, US I Corps on the west, US IX Corps in the center and ROKA II Corps on the east in the army zone.

With the withdrawal of the PVA from contact both in the west and northeast Korea about 7 November, confidence had reasserted itself in both Eighth Army and X Corps on 11 November reiterated its directive to proceed to the Yalu. Both Eighth Army and X Corps were still enjoined under MacArthur's directive of 24 October to proceed to the Yalu.

On 15 November MacArthur instructed Almond to open an attack to the west after his inland flank forces reached the town of Changjin, 40 km (25 mi) north of the Chosin Reservoir. 50 km (30 mi) west of Changjin lay Kanggye and a junction with the arterial road and rail line connecting Manp'ojin and Huich'on. The road and track obviously served as enemy supply routes, and it was MacArthur's intention that the X Corps' westward attack would cut them. Apprehensive that the supply line of the attack force would become precariously extended in any drive westward from a point as far north as Changjin town, Almond offered the alternative of an attack over the road leading into the Eighth Army zone from Yudam-ni (40.48°N 127.112°E) at the western edge of the Chosin Reservoir. The enemy supply routes were to be cut at the village of Mup'yŏng-ni, 90 km (55 mi) west of Yudam-ni and 65 km (40 mi) north of Huich'on. Almond intended that the 1st Marine Division make the westward effort into Mup'yŏng-ni and then press an attack northwestward to the Yalu, pinching out in the process ROKA II Corps on the Eighth Army right. MacArthur agreed to the change and instructed Almond to begin the attack as soon as possible. Almond set the 27th as the opening date. The 7th Division meanwhile was to expand its zone westward, placing forces on the east side of the Chosin Reservoir for an advance to the Yalu through the zone previously assigned to the Marines. ROKA I Corps was to continue to the border from Hapsu and Ch'ongjin while Almond's remaining major units, the US 3rd Division and 1st Korean Marine Corps Regiment, secured the Corps' rear area between Wonsan and Hungnam.

In accordance with Eighth Army's operational plan, the Joint Operations Center arranged 120 sorties for the Eighth Army's opening advance, these and others that might be requested during the day to be flown by the Fifth Air Force squadrons based in western Korea. Partridge allotted the Fifth Air Force and Marine squadrons in northeastern Korea to the support of the X Corps. The Navy squadrons aboard the USS Leyte and USS Philippine Sea meanwhile were to fly interdiction missions in the Eighth Army zone. As planned, Task Force 77 and Far East Air Forces' Bomber Command were to strike bridges and lines of communications within a 24-kilometre (15 mi) strip along the Yalu River. This interdiction would in effect extend the air campaign launched earlier by MacArthur against the Yalu bridges and North Korean supply and communications centers. The bombing attacks on the Yalu River crossings had already knocked down spans of the highway bridge at Sinuiju and two bridges at Hyesanjin, and incendiary strikes against North Korean towns had destroyed between 20 and 95 percent of the built-up areas. It was MacArthur's appraisal that this effort had "successfully interdicted enemy lines of support from the north so that further reinforcement therefrom has been sharply curtailed and essential supplies markedly limited".

==== The opposing forces ====
On the afternoon of 21 November, Eighth Army advised I and IX Corps and the ROKA that H-hour for the army attack was 10:00 24 November. Word of the attack hour had reached the front-line units by 23 November. The army front was generally quiet. Patrols went out several thousand yards in front of the line with little PVA/KPA contact. Nearly everywhere the PVA/KPA seemed to have withdrawn during the past week, leaving behind light outpost and covering positions. At no place did UN forces uncover what could be considered a main line of resistance. At the start of the offensive ROKA/UN ground forces numbered 423,000 while it was estimated that the KPA strength was approximately 97,000 and the PVA strength approximately 70,000. In fact PVA strength at this point was approximately 300,000 as the interdiction of supply routes had failed to prevent the buildup of PVA forces. By 23 November the UN Command acknowledged the presence of 12 Chinese infantry divisions when in fact there were nine armies with 30 infantry divisions. On 23 November, the PVA VIII Army Group's six armies were located 15–25 km (10–15 mi) north of the Eighth Army front. The 50th and 66th Armies stood opposite I Corps in the west; the 39th and 40th Armies were centrally located north of IX Corps; the 38th and 42nd Armies were above ROKA II Corps in the east. The 42nd Army earlier had opposed X Corps forces below the Chosin Reservoir, but had shifted west into the Eighth Army zone after being relieved by the 20th Army of the IX Army Group. The latter group, also deployed with major units assembled behind screening forces, was now located above and west of the reservoir. 20th Army was deployed to the west and south of Yudam-ni, in the path of the X Corps' coming westward drive and had assembled the 26th and 27th Armies in the mountains to the north and northeast of the reservoir. This arrangement of forces followed a long-existing Chinese concept of mobile defense designed for operations against a superior force. Aimed not to hold ground but to destroy opposing forces in brief actions, the underlying strategy was to invite attack; fight a delaying action while allowing the attack force to penetrate deep; then, at a point of Chinese choice, counterattack suddenly while the opposing force was ill-prepared to receive the assault. It was because the Chinese deployed major forces well behind screening units that Eighth Army patrols and X Corps assault forces had encountered only outposts after mid-November. Showing little awareness of their adversary's doctrine, however, UNC officials had assumed from the light contact that the PVA had withdrawn into position defenses far to the north, and they had interpreted the deep, voluntary withdrawal as further indication that the PVA were weak in numbers. With unwarranted optimism, then, Eighth Army and X Corps started forward on 24 November, believing that they comfortably outnumbered enemy forces and expecting to encounter these in defensive positions that their weakness, and perhaps their mission, had forced them to establish.

While Walker fully expected the Eighth Army to encounter Chinese when it moved north, the lack of revealing contact in his zone left him uncertain about the location of PVA/KPA positions. From a study of aerial reconnaissance and prisoner of war interrogations, his Intelligence Officer (G-2), Lieutenant colonel James C. Tarkenton, traced two possible PVA/KPA defense lines. The nearer line curved from Chongju northeast through T'aech'on and Unsan above the western half of the army front, then extended almost due east into the mountains roughly 16 km (10 mi) above the eastern segment of the front. The second line started at Sonch'on, 32 km (20 mi) beyond Chongju, and ran northeast through Kusong, Onjong and Huich'on and into the Taebaeks as far as the northern end of the Chosin Reservoir. Tarkenton estimated that the Eighth Army would meet some 48,000 PVA and several KPA units defending important road centers along these lines.

Walker distributed assault forces evenly for the advance toward the suspected lines. In the west, I Corps comprised the 24th Infantry Division, the ROKA 1st Division, and the 27th Commonwealth Brigade. At center, IX Corps included the 25th Infantry Division, the 2nd Infantry Division, and the brigade-size 1st Turkish Armed Forces Command, which had not yet seen combat in Korea. ROKA II Corps, on the east, would operate with the ROKA 6th, 7th and 8th Divisions. The 1st Cavalry Division and the British 29th Independent Infantry Brigade were Walker's immediate reserves. While in reserve the cavalry were to protect forward army supply points at Kunu-ri, located just below the Ch'ongch'on River in the IX Corps area, and at Sukch'on, 25 km (15 mi) south of the river on Route 1 behind I Corps. The British brigade, a recent arrival in Korea, was currently far to the south assembling temporarily at Kaesong, 50 km (30 mi) north of Seoul. Eighth Army units with no assignment in the attack included the 187th Airborne Regimental Combat Team and the Philippines 10th Battalion Combat Team, which were guarding supply installations in the Pyongyang-Chinnamp'o area, and ROKA III Corps with four recently activated or reactivated ROKA divisions (the 2nd, 5th, 9th and 11th) which was operating against guerrillas in central and southern Korea. The Thai Battalion had just finished processing at the UN Reception Center and was en route to Pyongyang on the eve of the advance. Replacing the Thais at the reception center was the Netherlands Battalion, which had reached Korea on 23 November and was to receive two weeks' training before joining operations.

==== Offensive ====
On the morning of 24 November I Corps commander General Milburn sent his two divisions west and northwest toward Chongju and T'aech'on, holding his British brigade in reserve. IX Corps commander General Coulter, kept the Turkish brigade in reserve at Kunu-ri, sent one division north astride the Kuryong River toward Unsan and Onjong, and moved his other division up the Ch'ongch'on valley in the direction of Huich'on. On the army right, Major general Yu Hae Ueng, the ROKA II Corps commander, started two of his three divisions north through the mountains toward terrain objectives aligned with those of Coulter's forces. At the I Corps left, Major general Church's 24th Division led off with a regimental attack over Route 1, its 21st Infantry and a company of tanks moving westward toward Chongju, 29 km (18 mi) away. On the Corps' right, two regiments of Major general Paik Sun Yup's ROKA 1st Division supported by a company of American tanks advanced on T'aech'on, moving upstream on both sides of the Taeryong River over secondary roads that converged on the objective 16 km (10 mi) northwest. The 21st Infantry Regiment marched more than halfway to Chongju during the day, receiving only a little long-range small arms fire from the hills north of Route 1 as it moved. Two platoons of PVA infantry and a ditch that delayed the tanks were the only opposition to Paik's forces, who established night defenses within 6 km (4 mi) of T'aech'on. In the left half of the IX Corps zone, the 25th Division, commanded by Major general William B. Kean, moved north astride the Kuryong River toward Unsan with two regiments and an armored force, Task Force Dolvin. The 35th and 24th Infantry Regiments on left and right, respectively, advanced 6 km (4 mi) unopposed, while Task Force Dolvin in the middle moved 11 km (7 mi) along the east bank of the Kuryong, receiving only small arms fire as it covered the last 1.5 km (1 mi). Six kilometres (4 mi) southeast of Unsan Task Force Dolvin recovered 30 members of the 8th Cavalry Regiment who had been captured in the Battle of Unsan in early November and then released by the PVA. Most were wounded and frostbitten. Major general Laurence B. Keiser's 2nd Infantry Division, at the IX Corps' right, sought no sweeping first-day gains since it was already 5 km (3 mi) ahead of the 25th Division. Rather than risk an open west flank, Keiser ordered short moves by his line regiments, the 9th and 38th, to mass along the lower bank of the Paengnyong River, a westward flowing tributary of the Ch'ongch'on. In the ROKA II Corps zone, gains by the ROKA 7th and 8th Divisions ranged from 0.5 to 1.5 km (1/4 to 1 mi) but none at all against two PVA/KPA battalions dug in near the boundary between them. In one of the deeper gains, the ROKA 3rd Regiment, 7th Division at the Corps' left came up to the Paengnyong River and tied in with the 38th Infantry of the 2nd Division.

MacArthur, other senior commanders and several chiefs of US press bureaus in Tokyo, had flown to Korea on the morning of the 24th to witness the beginning of the attack. Walker joined them in visits to I Corps, IX Corps and 24th Division headquarters along the Ch'ongch'on. At I Corps headquarters Milburn cast a momentary shadow over the bright picture being drawn when he told the party that his patrols had found the Unsan area heavily defended, and in his opinion the projected IX Corps attack there would not progress easily. Church briefed the party at the 24th Division headquarters shortly after noon on the progress of the attack. Optimism and enthusiasm as to chances of the attack succeeding seemed to prevail.

Chongju and T'aech'on remained the immediate I Corps objectives on 25 November. Chongju, previously tagged as a probable center of PVA/KPA resistance, was empty when the 21st Infantry entered in midafternoon. In preparation for widening the 24th Division's advance, Church meanwhile moved the 19th Infantry out on Route 1 to Napch'ongjong (39.688°N 125.378°E), 13 km (8 mi) before Chongju. The ROKA 1st Division, on the other hand, had found during the night that T'aech'on would be harder to take when PVA supported by artillery and mortar fire counterattacked along the east bank of the Taeryong and forced part of Paik's right regiment 3 km (2 mi) to the rear. Although the PVA lifted their attack after daylight, they allowed the ROKA only to restore and improve slightly their previous position. Paik's forces west of the Taeryong held themselves to a small advance while those on the east regained lost ground. The division was still 5 km (3 mi) short of T'aech'on at dark on the 25th. Encountering no organized PVA/KPA positions but receiving considerable long-range small arms, machine gun, and mortar fire, the two IX Corps divisions gained 3–6 km (2–4 mi) on the 25th. At that rate the 25th Division astride the Kuryong on the Corps left was easily within a day's advance of Unsan. On the Corps' right, the 9th Infantry Regiment, 2nd Division moved 3 km (2 mi) up the Ch'ongch'on valley, closing into positions split by the Ch'ongch'on with the bulk of the regiment on the west side of the river. The 38th Infantry meanwhile stayed at the Paengnyong except for patrols that searched above the river to cover the 9th's east flank. ROKA II Corps advanced 1.5–3 km (1–2 mi) against opposition that varied in much the same pattern as on the previous day. The Corps' center continued to be a trouble spot, and at the far right, 16 km (10 mi) to the rear of the ROKA front, an enemy force tested the 16th Regiment, 8th Division protecting the Corps' and Eighth Army east flank from positions some 13 km (8 mi) east of the village of Yongdong-ni (39.657°N 126.506°E). The force, presumably PVA and possibly a reconnaissance unit since it was reported to include a hundred horse cavalrymen, struck the easternmost battalion of the 16th and lifted its attack only after forcing the ROKA to withdraw 3 km (2 mi).

Although the second day of advance had produced heavier PVA/KPA fire and local counterattacks, Walker's forces had little reason to lose enthusiasm for their renewed offensive. All divisions had gained ground. In the I Corps zone, the 24th Division, having occupied Chongju, was on the Eighth Army's first phase line, and the ROKA 1st Division was close to it. In the IX Corps zone, the 25th Division was not far from Unsan and the 2nd Division had made progress in the Ch'ongch'on valley. Despite rougher going in the Taebaek ridges farther east, ROKA II Corps also had pushed forward. Casualties had not been heavy in any of the Corps' zones. The advance, moreover, was soon to be reinforced by X Corps' attack from the east. Walker issued a single order on the 25th, one that shortened the final objective line of ROKA II Corps to conform with the 27 November attack by Almond's forces. Otherwise, he intended that the Eighth Army would continue its advance on the 26th as originally conceived. The Eighth Army's optimism still hinged on the assumption that the Chinese had not tapped their large Manchurian reserve for offensive operations in Korea. Although the final army intelligence report on 25 November showed an increase in PVA forces opposing the advance, the new figure stood at only 54,000, just 6,000 more than the pre-attack estimate. In reviewing possible PVA/KPA actions, Tarkenton added only that he now expected PVA/KPA forces to employ local counterattacks in conjunction with their defense.

== Aftermath ==
On 24 October, when Eighth Army troops crossed the Ch'ongch'on River and the ROKA 6th Division passed through Huich'on and headed for the Yalu, less than six weeks had passed since that army had battled desperately at the Pusan Perimeter. Since then, the Eighth Army, moving up from the south had penetrated 130 miles (210 km) into North Korea. In doing this it had overrun Pyongyang and breached the last important river barrier south of the northern border of the country. These attacks had virtually destroyed the KPA.

By the end of the first week of November, it was clear that Chinese forces had intervened in the war. This intervention, long feared and by some expected, had become a fact. The intervention came in sufficient force to drive the Eighth Army back to the Ch'ongch'on River and to delay the advance of X Corps in the east toward the Chosin Reservoir. After accomplishing this, the PVA withdrew from immediate contact with Eighth Army behind a screen of KPA forces. In the two weeks after the Chinese broke off their offensive and withdrew from contact with Eighth Army, the impact of the Chinese intervention on the American command gradually subsided. Among Eighth Army staff members, the motive generally ascribed for the intervention was that the Chinese wanted to protect the power plants south of the Yalu River. Many now thought they would dig in on a defensive line to do this. As the days passed and the front remained quiet, fear of massive Chinese intervention dwindled. On 22 November, X Corps intelligence reported that the PVA was "apparently preparing to make a defensive stand in his present positions", and that there was "no evidence to indicate any considerable number of [PVA] units have crossed the border since the initial reinforcement". Against this optimistic assessment the UN Command launched its "Home by Christmas" Offensive intended to complete the conquest of North Korea.

On 25 November the PVA launched their Second Phase Offensive with the Battle of the Ch'ongch'on River against Eighth Army and the Battle of Chosin Reservoir against X Corps. By the end of December, these and subsequent PVA/KPA attacks had forced the UN forces to retreat below the 38th Parallel.

== See also ==
- UN September 1950 counteroffensive
- Second Phase Offensive
- Korean War
