= General Watts =

General Watts may refer to:

- Herbert Watts (1858–1934), British Army lieutenant general
- John Watts (British Army officer) (1930–2003), British Army lieutenant general
- Ronald L. Watts (born 1934), U.S. Army lieutenant general
- Dennis Watts (US Army officer), US Army brigadier general and commander of the Georgia State Defense Force

== See also ==
- Angus Watt (fl. 1970s-2000s), Canadian Forces lieutenant general
- Redmond Watt (born 1950), British Army general
