= Ronald Watts =

Ronald Watts may refer to:

- Ronald Lampman Watts (1929–2015), Canadian academic
- Ronald L. Watts (born 1934), United States Army general
- Ron Watts (1943–2022), American basketball player
