= Campbell B. Hodges =

American Army general

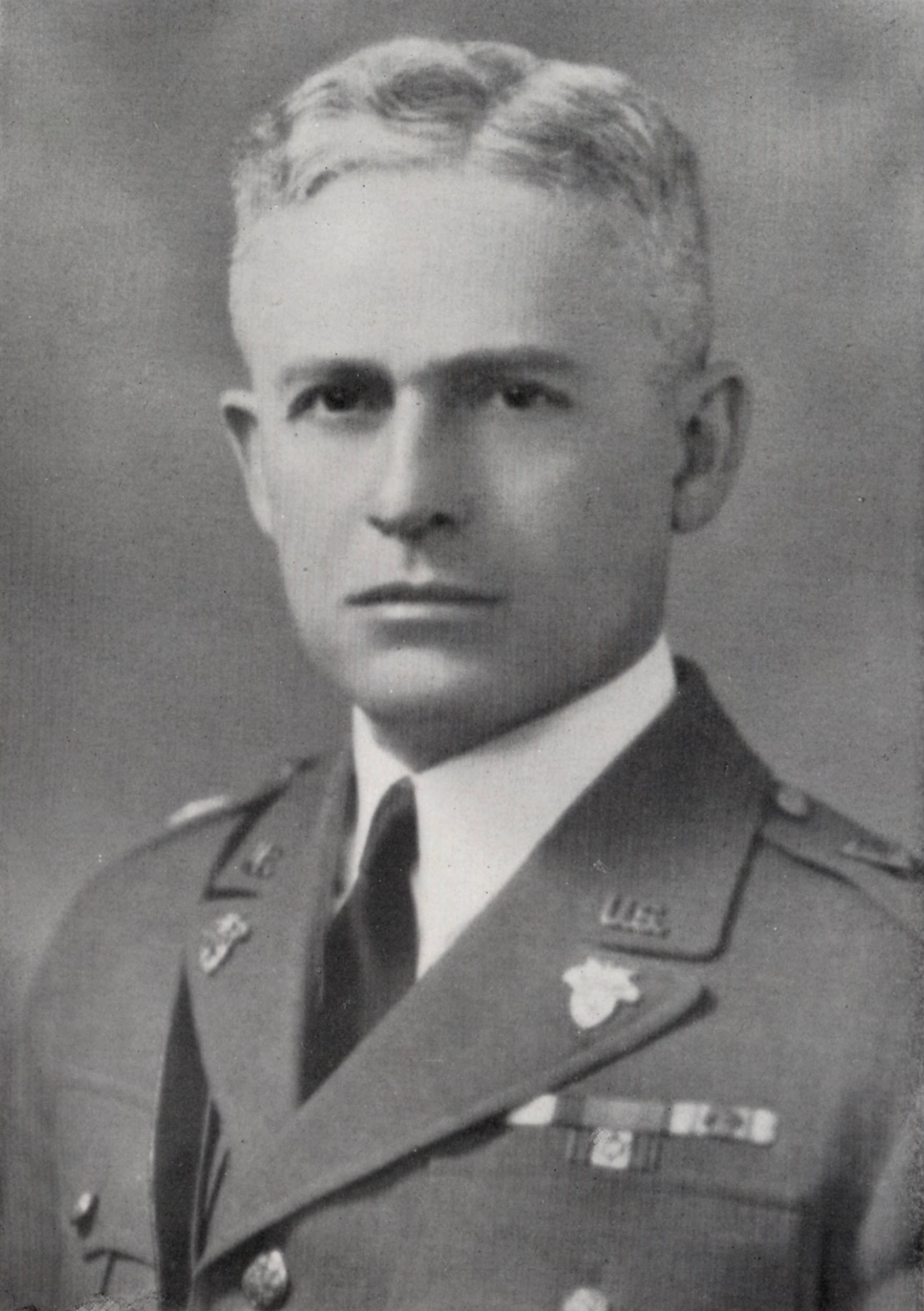
- Campbell B. Hodges in 1929
- Born: 27 March 1881; Bossier Parish, Louisiana
- Died: 23 November 1944 (aged 63); New Orleans, Louisiana
- Military career
- Allegiance: United States
- Branch: United States Army
- Service years: 1903–1941
- Rank: Major General
- Unit: Infantry Branch
- Commands: VII Corps (Tactical); 5th Corps Area; 5th Infantry Division; 14th Brigade; Corps of Cadets, U.S. Military Academy; 122nd Infantry Regiment
- Conflicts: World War I
- Awards: Army Distinguished Service Medal

Campbell Blackshear Hodges (27 March 1881 – 23 November 1944) was a United States Army major general. He commanded the 5th Infantry Division from October 1939 to May 1940, the 5th Corps Area from June 1940 to October 1940 and VII Corps (Tactical) from October 1940 to June 1941. After retirement from the Army, he served as president of Louisiana State University from 1941 to 1944.

== Early life and education ==
Born on the Elm Grove Plantation along the Red River in Bossier Parish, Louisiana, Hodges studied at Mount Lebanon College and the Louisiana Polytechnic Institute before entering the United States Military Academy in 1899. He graduated in June 1903 and was commissioned as an infantry officer. Hodges later earned an A.M. degree from Louisiana State University in 1913. He graduated from the field officers' course at the Chemical Warfare School in 1931 and the United States Army War College in 1933.

== Military career ==
Hodges served in the Philippines with the 4th Infantry from October 1903 to June 1905 and with the 4th Infantry and the 30th Infantry from April 1907 to September 1909. After returning to the United States, he briefly served with the 5th Infantry before rejoining the 4th Infantry and briefly commanding a company from July to August 1910.

Hodges was reassigned to teach tactics at the Military Academy from August 1910 to June 1911. He then taught military science and tactics and also Spanish at Louisiana State University from August 1911 to December 1912 before completing the requirements for his master's degree in March 1913.

Hodges returned to the 4th Infantry in March 1913, serving at Galveston, Texas and Vera Cruz, Mexico and commanding a company from August 1914 to April 1915. He served as a temporary lieutenant colonel with the 1st Infantry, Louisiana National Guard at San Benito, Texas from June to September 1916.

In September 1917, five months after the American entry into World War I, Hodges was assigned to the 31st Division at Camp Wheeler in Georgia as an assistant chief of staff, but ended up serving as the acting chief of staff for ten months. In September 1918, he was given command of the 122nd Infantry Regiment and received a temporary promotion to colonel when the division was sent to France towards the end of the war. Hodges received the Army Distinguished Service Medal for his World War I service with the 31st Division. The citation for the medal reads:

The President of the United States of America, authorized by Act of Congress, July 9, 1918, takes pleasure in presenting the Army Distinguished Service Medal to Colonel (Infantry) Campbell Blackshear Hodges, United States Army, for exceptionally meritorious and distinguished services to the Government of the United States, in a duty of great responsibility during World War I. As Acting Chief of Staff, 31st Division, Colonel Hodges demonstrated the highest professional attainments, and through his zeal and never-failing tact he was responsible in a large measure for the development of the high efficiency of that Division. Later, as a member of the War Department General Staff, he rendered most valuable service in the development of the system of classification of commissioned personnel now in use.

In March 1920, Hodges reverted to his permanent rank of captain before being promoted to major in July of that year. He served as military attaché in Spain and Portugal from May 1923 to January 1926. In April 1926, he was assigned as the commandant of cadets at the Military Academy. Hodges was promoted to lieutenant colonel on 23 April 1927.

Lieutenant Colonel Hodges (center), Commandment of Cadets at West Point, being decorated with the Spanish Military Cross of Merit by Ambassador Padilla for his service at the American Embassy in Spain from 1923 to 1926.

While serving as commandant of cadets, Hodges was offered the presidency of Louisiana State University. He declined the offer to remain in the army and instead became the Senior Military Aide to President Herbert Hoover in March 1929. Hodges served as Hoover's aide until March 1933 and then as President Franklin Roosevelt's aide until June 1933 when relieved by Lieutenant Colonel Edwin M. Watson.

In November 1933, Hodges joined the 14th Infantry Regiment at Fort Davis in the Panama Canal Zone. On 1 October 1934, he was promoted to colonel and given command of Fort Davis. In August 1936, Hodges became the chief of staff of the 4th Corps Area at Atlanta, Georgia.

Promoted to brigadier general on 24 December 1936, Hodges was given command of the 14th Brigade and Fort Snelling in Minnesota. He then commanded the 5th Infantry Division at Fort McClellan in Alabama from October 1939 to May 1940. In June 1940, Hodges was given command of the 5th Corps Area at Fort Hayes in Ohio. He was promoted to major general on 1 September 1940. In October 1940, Hodges assumed command of VII Corps (Tactical) at Camp Beauregard in Louisiana. He relinquished command and retired from active duty on 30 June 1941.

== Later life ==
Hodges assumed the presidency of Louisiana State University on 1 July 1941 and served until 1944. Not long afterwards, he died of an intracerebral hemorrhage at LaGarde General Hospital in New Orleans. Hodges was buried at the West Point Cemetery on 27 November 1944.

== Legacy ==
In 1949, Campbell B. Hodges Hall was built at Louisiana State University in his honor.

Military offices
Preceded by Newly activated organization	Commanding General 5th Infantry Division; 1939–1940	Succeeded by Joseph M. Cummins
