= Uncles (surname) =

Uncles is a surname. Notable people with the surname include:

- Charles Uncles (1859–1933), American Catholic priest.
- John Francis Uncles (1898–1967), American lieutenant general
