= General Oakes =

General Oakes may refer to:

- Hildebrand Oakes (1754–1822), British Army lieutenant general
- John Cogswell Oakes (1906–1982), U.S. Army lieutenant general
- Robert C. Oaks (born 1936), U.S. Air Force general
