= 5th Infantry Division (United States) =

Inactive US Army formation

- 5th Infantry Division shoulder sleeve insignia
- Active: 17 November 1917– 4 October 1921; 16 October 1939– 20 September 1946; 15 July 1947– 30 April 1950; 6 April 1951– 1 September 1953; 25 May 1954– 1 June 1957; 19 February 1962– 15 December 1970; 21 September 1975– 15 December 1992
- Country: United States
- Branch: United States Army
- Type: Infantry
- Size: Division
- Nicknames: "Red Diamond", "Red Devils"
- Motto: We Will
- Engagements: World War I; St. Mihiel; Meuse-Argonne; Alsace 1918; Lorraine 1918; World War II; Normandy; Northern France; Rhineland; Ardennes-Alsace; Central Europe; Vietnam War; Operation Just Cause

Commanders
- Notable commanders: Stafford LeRoy Irwin; Bernard W. Rogers

Insignia
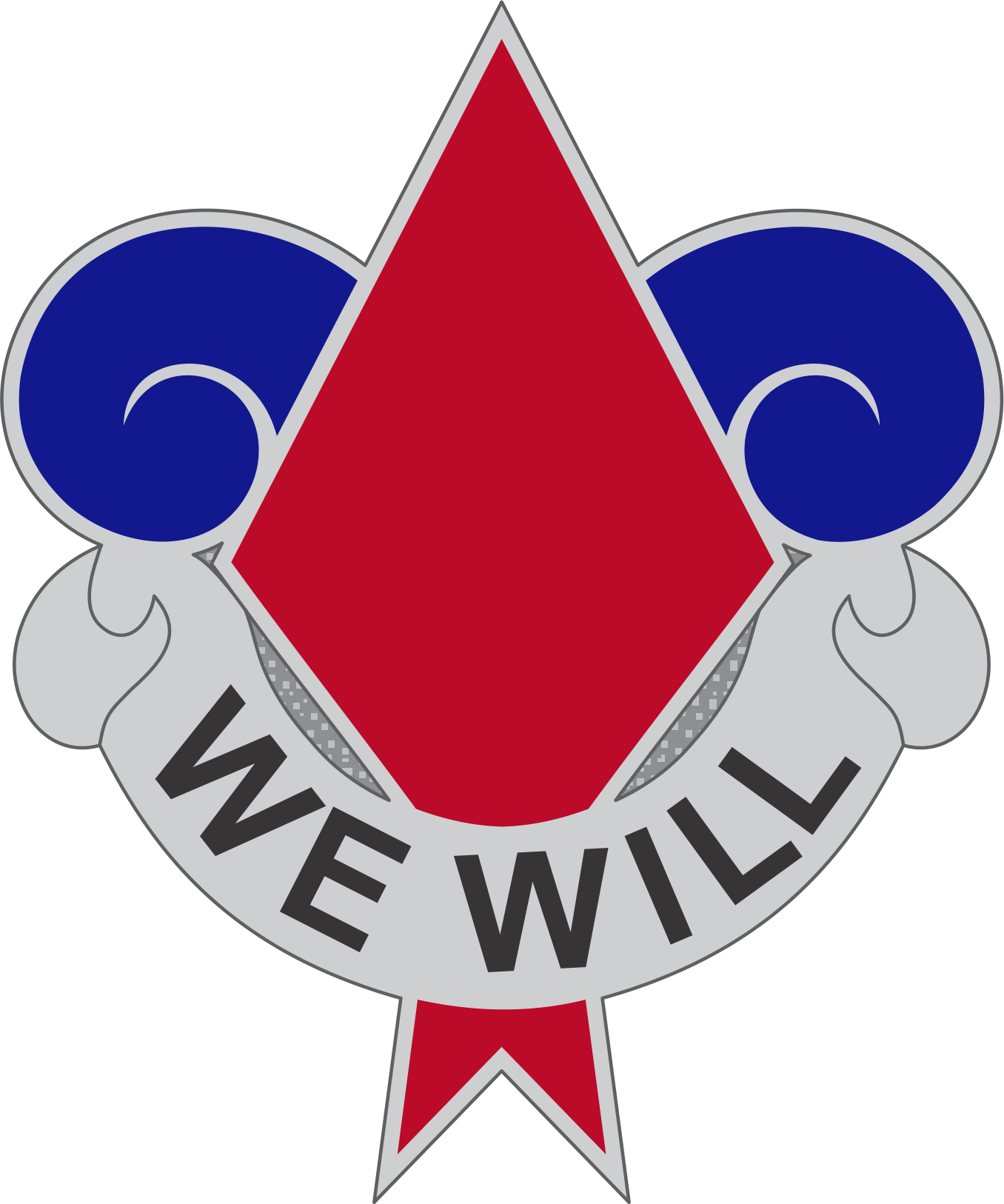
- Distinctive unit insignia

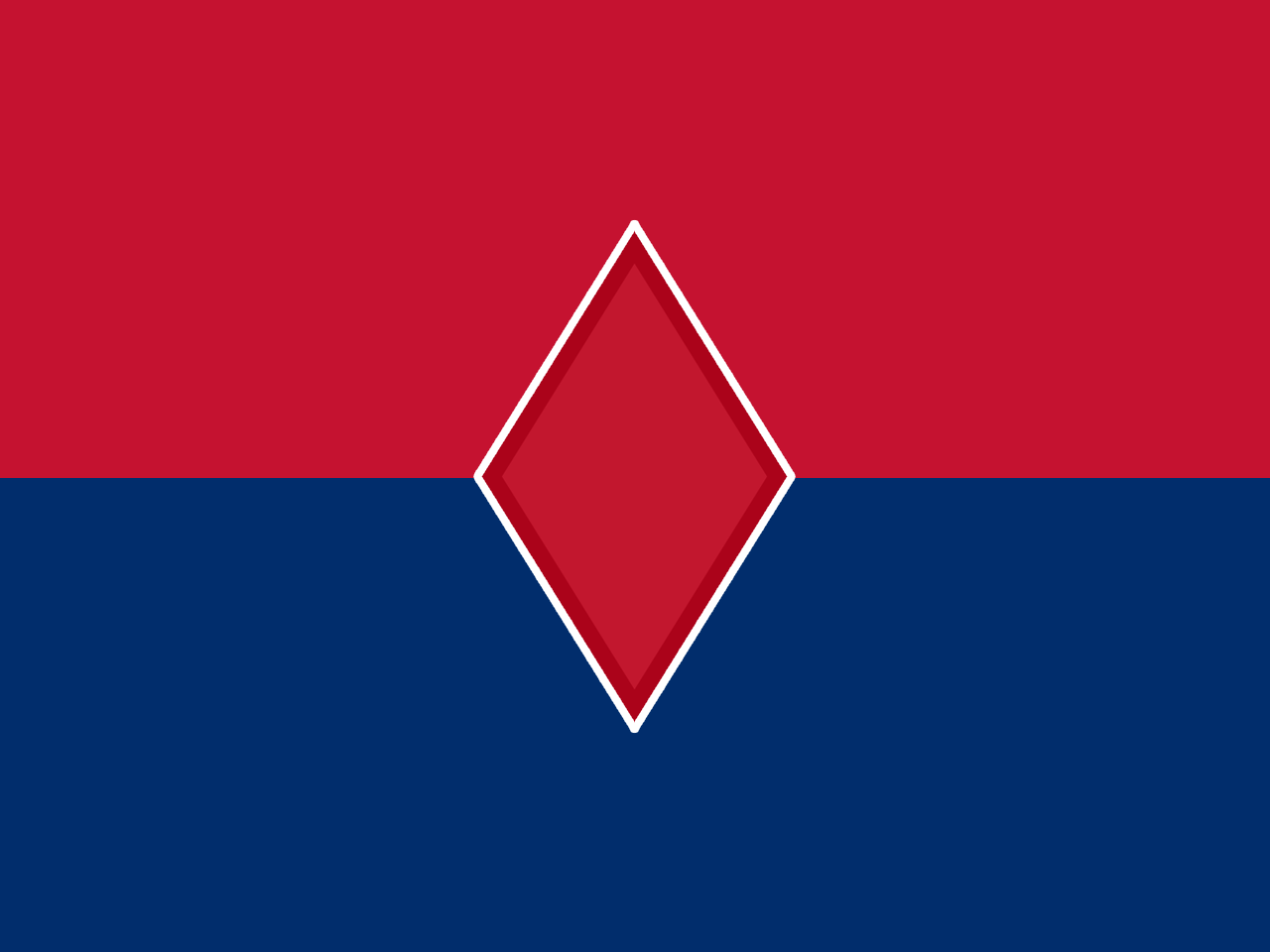
- Flag of the United States Army 5th Infantry Division

The 5th Infantry Division (Mechanized)—nicknamed the "Red Diamond", or the "Red Devils" —was an infantry division of the United States Army that served in World War I, World War II and the Vietnam War, and with the North Atlantic Treaty Organization (NATO) and the U.S. Army III Corps. It was deactivated on 24 November 1992 and reflagged as the 2nd Armored Division.

== History ==
=== World War I ===
==== Organization ====
On 17 November 1917, the War Department directed the organization of the 5th Division with headquarters at Camp Logan, Texas, around a cadre of Regular Army troops that had been stationed at Camp Logan, Camp Forrest, Georgia, Camp Greene, North Carolina, Camp Johnston, Florida, Camp Stanley, Texas, and Fort Leavenworth, Kansas. Major General Charles H. Muir assumed command on 11 December 1917. The organization was a "square" division (i.e., there were four infantry regiments) with an authorized strength of 28,105 personnel.

- 5th Division
  - Headquarters, 5th Division
  - 9th Infantry Brigade
    - 60th Infantry Regiment (formed with a cadre from the 7th Infantry)
    - 61st Infantry Regiment (formed with a cadre from the 7th Infantry)
    - 14th Machine Gun Battalion
  - 10th Infantry Brigade
    - 6th Infantry Regiment
    - 11th Infantry Regiment
    - 15th Machine Gun Battalion
  - 5th Field Artillery Brigade
    - 19th Field Artillery Regiment (75 mm) (formed with a cadre from the 7th Field Artillery)
    - 20th Field Artillery Regiment (75 mm) (formed with a cadre from the 7th Field Artillery)
    - 21st Field Artillery Regiment (155 mm) (formed with a cadre from the 3rd Field Artillery)
    - 5th Trench Mortar Battery
  - 13th Machine Gun Battalion
  - 7th Engineer Regiment
  - 9th Field Signal Battalion
  - Headquarters Troop, 5th Division
  - 5th Train Headquarters and Military Police
    - 5th Ammunition Train
    - 5th Supply Train
    - 5th Engineer Train
    - 5th Sanitary Train
      - 17th, 25th, 29th, and 30th Ambulance Companies and Field Hospitals

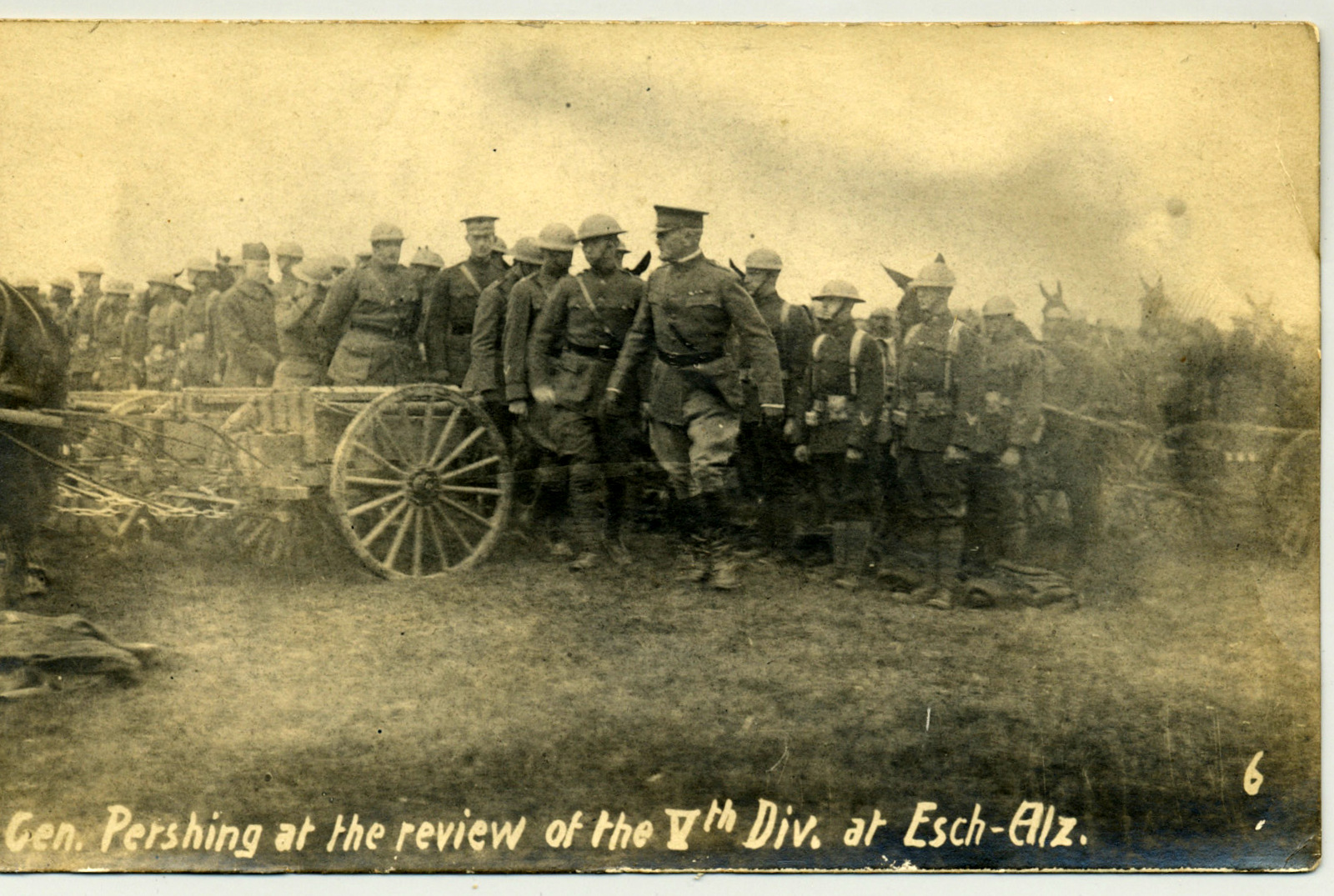
November 1918: General Pershing at a review of the 5th Division in Esch-sur-Alzette, Luxembourg.

The entire division arrived in France by 1 May 1918 and components of the units were deployed into the front line. The 5th Division was the eighth of forty-two American divisions to arrive on the Western Front. The 5th Division trained with French Army units from 1 to 14 June 1918. The first soldiers of the unit to be killed in action died on 14 June of that year. Among the division's first casualties was Captain Mark W. Clark, then commanding the 3rd Battalion, 11th Infantry Regiment, who would later become a four-star general.

On 12 September, the unit was part of a major attack that reduced the salient at St. Mihiel and later fought in the Meuse–Argonne offensive, the largest battle fought by the American Expeditionary Forces (AEF) (and the largest in the history of the U.S. Army) in World War I. The war ended soon after, on November 11, 1918.

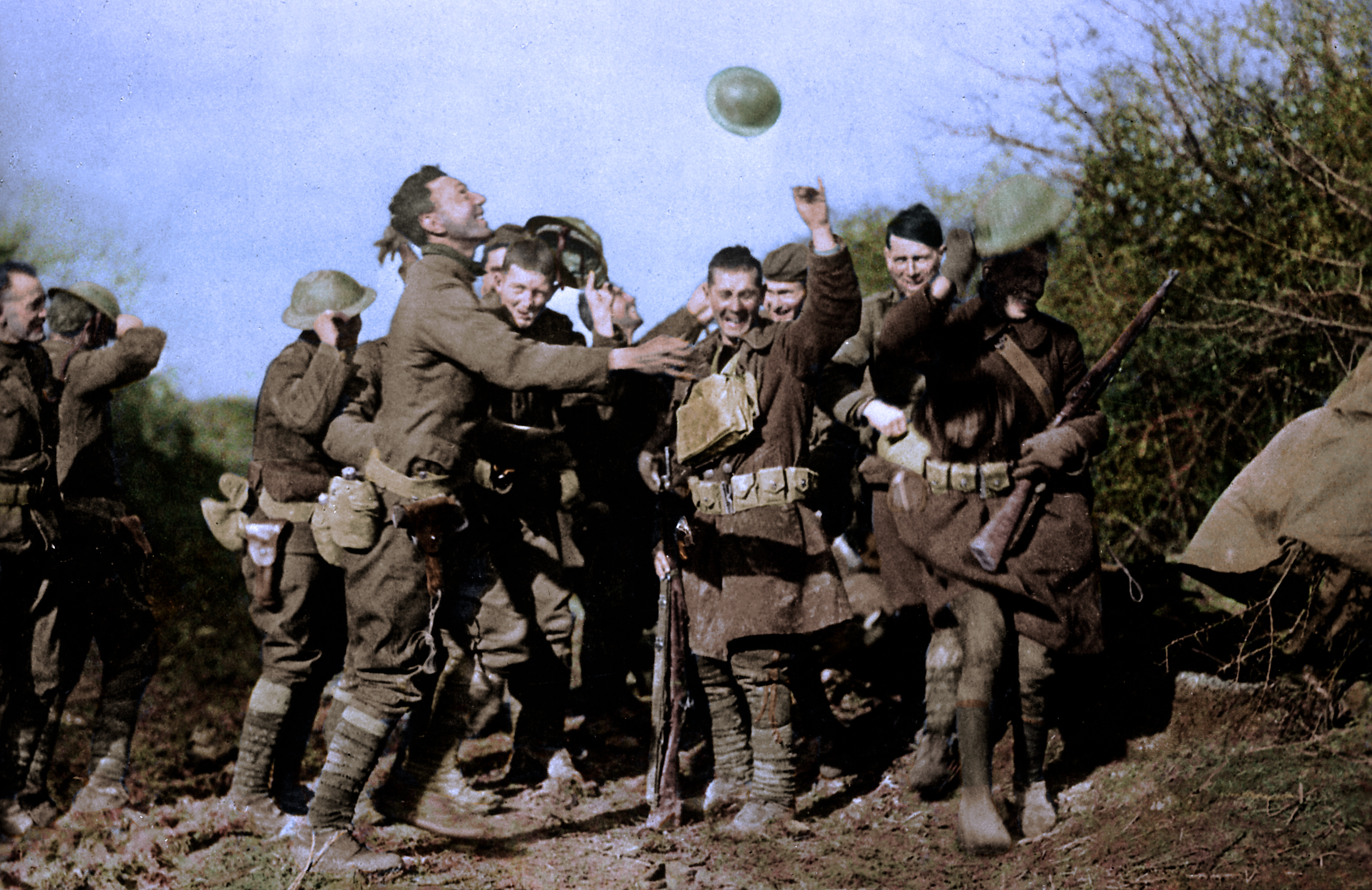
Doughboys of the 6th Infantry Regiment, 5th Division, stationed at Remoiville, rejoice as they receive news of the Armistice on the eleventh hour of the eleventh day of the eleventh month, 1918.

The division then served for the next few months in the Army of Occupation, being based in Belgium and Esch-sur-Alzette, Luxembourg until it departed Europe. The division returned to the United States through the New York Port of Embarkation at Hoboken, New Jersey, on 21 July 1919.

==== Insignia ====
The 5th Division adopted a red diamond as its shoulder sleeve insignia. The color red was selected in honor of World War I commander John E. McMahon, who was a member of the Army's Field Artillery branch. The diamond shape was chosen in recognition of the Diamond Dyes company, a maker of fabric coloring products whose ad slogan "It Never Runs" conveyed a martial meaning during war. The shape of the diamond in the 5th Division's insignia represents strength, because in bridge construction the trusses that provide the greatest durability are mutually supporting isosceles triangles.

=== Interwar period ===
Upon arrival at Camp Merritt, New Jersey, emergency period personnel were discharged from the service. The division proceeded to Camp Gordon, Georgia, arrived there 26 July, and remained there until October 1920, when it was transferred to Camp Jackson, South Carolina, for permanent station. As a part of the War Department's decision to maintain only three fully-active stateside infantry divisions, the 5th Division was inactivated, less the 10th Infantry Brigade and several smaller units, on 4 October 1921 at Camp Jackson. The 5th Division was allotted to the Fifth Corps Area for mobilization responsibility, and assigned to the V Corps. Camp Knox, Kentucky, was designated as the mobilization and training station for the division upon reactivation. During the period 1921–39, the active elements of the 5th Division consisted of the 10th Infantry Brigade and other assorted divisional elements which formed the base from which the remainder of the division would be reactivated in the event of war.

The division headquarters was organized on 5 May 1926 as a "Regular Army Inactive" (RAI) unit with Organized Reserve personnel at Fort Benjamin Harrison, Indiana, and functioned in essentially the same manner as the headquarters of an Organized Reserve division. Headquarters, Fifth Corps Area, subsequently ordered the headquarters to cease operations on 1 September 1927, and all Regular Army personnel assigned to the headquarters were relieved. Though the command functions of the division ceased, Reserve personnel remained assigned to the division headquarters for training, mobilization, and assignment purposes. By 1927, most of the inactive elements of the division were also organized with Reserve personnel as RAI units. The RAI units generally trained with the active elements of the division during summer training camps. Several units, such as the 5th Medical Regiment, 19th and 21st Field Artillery Regiments, and the 60th and 61st Infantry Regiments were affiliated with various colleges and universities sponsoring ROTC and organized as RAI units with the Regular Army cadre and commissionees from the schools’ programs. The active elements of the division also maintained habitual training relationships with units of the V Corps, XV Corps, and the 83rd, 84th, and 100th Divisions. The training of those Reserve units was usually conducted at Camp Knox and at the regimental home stations of the 10th and 11th Infantry Regiments. These two regiments also supported the Reserve units’ conduct of the Citizens Military Training Camps held at Camp Knox, Fort Benjamin Harrison, and Fort Thomas, Kentucky.

The 10th Infantry Brigade, reinforced by the active elements of the 5th Tank Company, 19th Field Artillery Regiment, 5th Quartermaster Regiment, and the 6th Division's 3rd Field Artillery Regiment, held maneuvers in those years when funds were available, at Camp Knox. During these maneuvers, the 5th Division headquarters was occasionally formed in a provisional status to train Regular and Reserve officers in division-level command and control procedures. The division headquarters was also provisionally formed for the August 1936 Second Army maneuvers at Fort Knox. For that maneuver, the division (10th Infantry Brigade as the nucleus) was reinforced by the 1st Signal Company and the West Virginia National Guard’s 201st Infantry, in addition to the other active divisional elements.

=== World War II ===
On 16 October 1939, the 5th Division was reactivated as part of the United States mobilization in response to the outbreak of World War II in Europe the previous month, being formed at Fort McClellan, Alabama, under the command of Brigadier General Campbell Hodges.

==== Division organization ====
The 5th Infantry Division consisted of the following units:

5th Infantry Division organization (click to enlarge)

- 5th Infantry Division
  - 5th Infantry Division Headquarters
  - 5th Cavalry Reconnaissance Troop (Mechanized) (M3 scout cars and then M8 Greyhound armored cars)
  - 2nd Infantry Regiment
    - Headquarters and Headquarters Company
    - 3× Infantry battalions
      - each battalion consists of: 1× Headquarters and Headquarters Company, 3× Rifle companies, 1× Heavy Weapons Company
    - Cannon Company (T12 Gun Motor Carriages and T19 Howitzer Motor Carriages, later replaced by either M3 105mm towed howitzers or M7 Priest self propelled howitzers)
    - Anti-Tank Company (M3 37mm anti-tank guns, which were replaced by 1944 with M1 57mm anti-tank guns)
    - Service Company
  - 10th Infantry Regiment
    - same organization as 2nd Infantry Regiment
  - 11th Infantry Regiment
    - same organization as 2nd Infantry Regiment
  - 5th Infantry Division Artillery
    - Headquarters and Headquarters Battery
    - 19th Field Artillery Battalion
      - Headquarters and Headquarters Battery
      - 3× Batteries (M2 105mm towed howitzers)
      - Service Battery
    - 21st Field Artillery Battalion
      - Headquarters and Headquarters Battery
      - 3× Batteries (M1 155mm towed howitzers)
      - Service Battery
    - 46th Field Artillery Battalion
      - same organization as 19th Field Artillery Battalion
    - 50th Field Artillery Battalion
      - same organization as 19th Field Artillery Battalion
  - Headquarters Special Troops
    - Headquarters Company, 5th Infantry Division
    - 5th Signal Company
    - 5th Quartermaster Company
    - 705th Ordnance Light Maintenance Company
    - 5th Military Police Platoon
    - 5th Infantry Division Band (attached)
  - 7th Engineer Combat Battalion
    - Headquarters and Headquarters and Service Company
    - 3× Engineer combat companies
  - 5th Medical Battalion
    - Headquarters and Headquarters Detachment
    - 3× Collecting companies
    - Clearing Company

==== Training ====
In spring 1940, the division was sent to Fort Benning, Georgia, and then temporarily to Louisiana for training exercises, before being transferred to Fort Benjamin Harrison at the end of May 1940. That December the division relocated to Fort Custer, Michigan. The division received over 5,300 draftees during February and March 1941, chiefly hailing from Michigan and the Great Lakes region. From Fort Custer, the division participated in the Tennessee maneuvers in June 1941. The division went next to Camp Joseph T. Robinson, Arkansas, in August 1941 to stage for both the Arkansas and Louisiana Maneuvers, before returning to Fort Custer that October. The division, having been under the command of Major General Cortlandt Parker from August, was there when the Japanese attacked Pearl Harbor and Germany declared war on the United States in December 1941, thus bringing the United States into the conflict. As the winter passed, the division was brought up to strength and fully equipped for forward deployment into a war zone. During April 1942, the 5th Division received its overseas orders and departed the New York Port of Embarkation (NYPOE) at the end of the month for Iceland. The 5th Division debarked there in May 1942, where it replaced the British garrison on the island outpost along the Atlantic convoy routes and a year later was reorganized and re-designated as the 5th Infantry Division on 24 May 1943.

==== Combat chronicle ====
===== Normandy =====
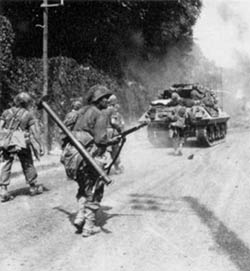
Men of the 5th Infantry Division advance toward Fontainebleau en route to Paris, supported by M10 tank destroyers of the 818th Tank Destroyer Battalion

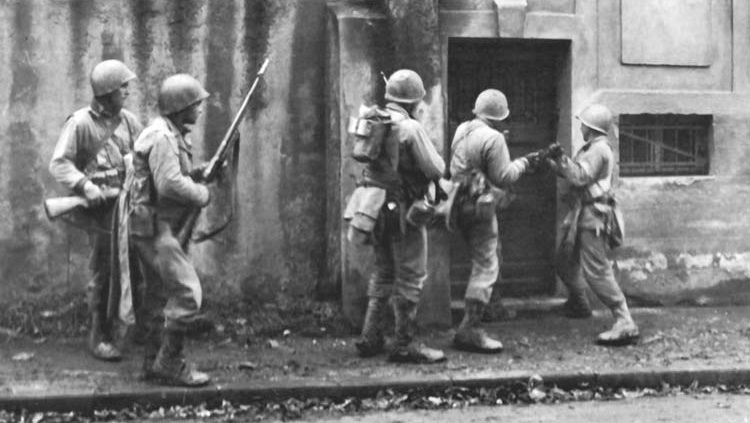
Men of the 5th Infantry Division advance toward Metz

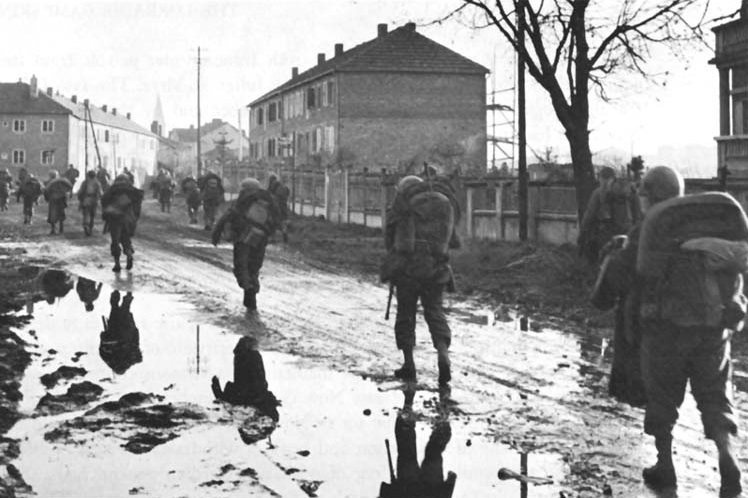
Men of the 5th Infantry Division advance toward Metz

The 5th Infantry Division, now commanded by Major General Stafford LeRoy Irwin, left Iceland in early August 1943 and was sent to England to prepare and train for the eventual invasion of Northwest Europe, then scheduled for the spring of 1944. Upon arrival in England the 5th Division was stationed at Tidworth Barracks in South West England, before moving to Northern Ireland. The 5th Infantry Division then underwent a comprehensive training schedule in preparation for their deployment to France. After two years of training the 5th ID landed in Normandy on Utah Beach, on 9 July 1944, over a month after the initial D-Day landings, and four days later took up defensive positions in the vicinity of Caumont-l'Éventé. Launching a successful attack at Vidouville 26 July, the division drove on southeast of Saint-Lô, attacked and captured Angers, 9–10 August, captured Chartres, (assisted by the 7th Armored Division), 18 August, pushed to Fontainebleau, crossed the Seine at Montereau, 24 August, crossed the Marne and seized Reims, 30 August, and positions east of Verdun. The division then prepared for the assault on Metz, 7 September. In mid-September a bridgehead was secured across the Moselle, south of Metz, at Dornot and Arnaville after two attempts. The first attempt at Dornot by the 11th Infantry Regiment failed. German-held Fort Driant played a role in repulsing this crossing. A second crossing by the 10th Infantry Regiment at Arnaville was successful. The division continued operations against Metz, 16 September to 16 October 1944, withdrew, then returned to the assault on 9 November. Metz finally fell 22 November. The division crossed the German border, 4 December, captured Lauterbach (a suburb of Völklingen) on the 5th, and elements reached the west bank of the river Saar, 6 December, before the division moved to assembly areas.

On 16 December, the Germans launched their winter offensive in the Ardennes forest, the Battle of the Bulge, and on the 18th the 5th ID was thrown in against the southern flank of the Bulge, helping to reduce it by the end of January 1945. In February and March, the division drove across and northeast of the Sauer, where it smashed through the Siegfried Line and later took part in the Allied invasion of Germany.

===== Across the Rhine =====
The 5th ID crossed the river Rhine at Nierstein on the night of 22 March 1945. After capturing some 19,000 German soldiers, the division continued to Frankfurt-am-Main, clearing and policing the town and its environs, 27–29 March. In April the 5th ID, now commanded by Major General Albert E. Brown, after Major General Irwin's promotion to command of XII Corps, took part in clearing the Ruhr Pocket and then drove across the Czechoslovak border, 1 May, reaching Volary and Vimperk as the war in Europe ended.

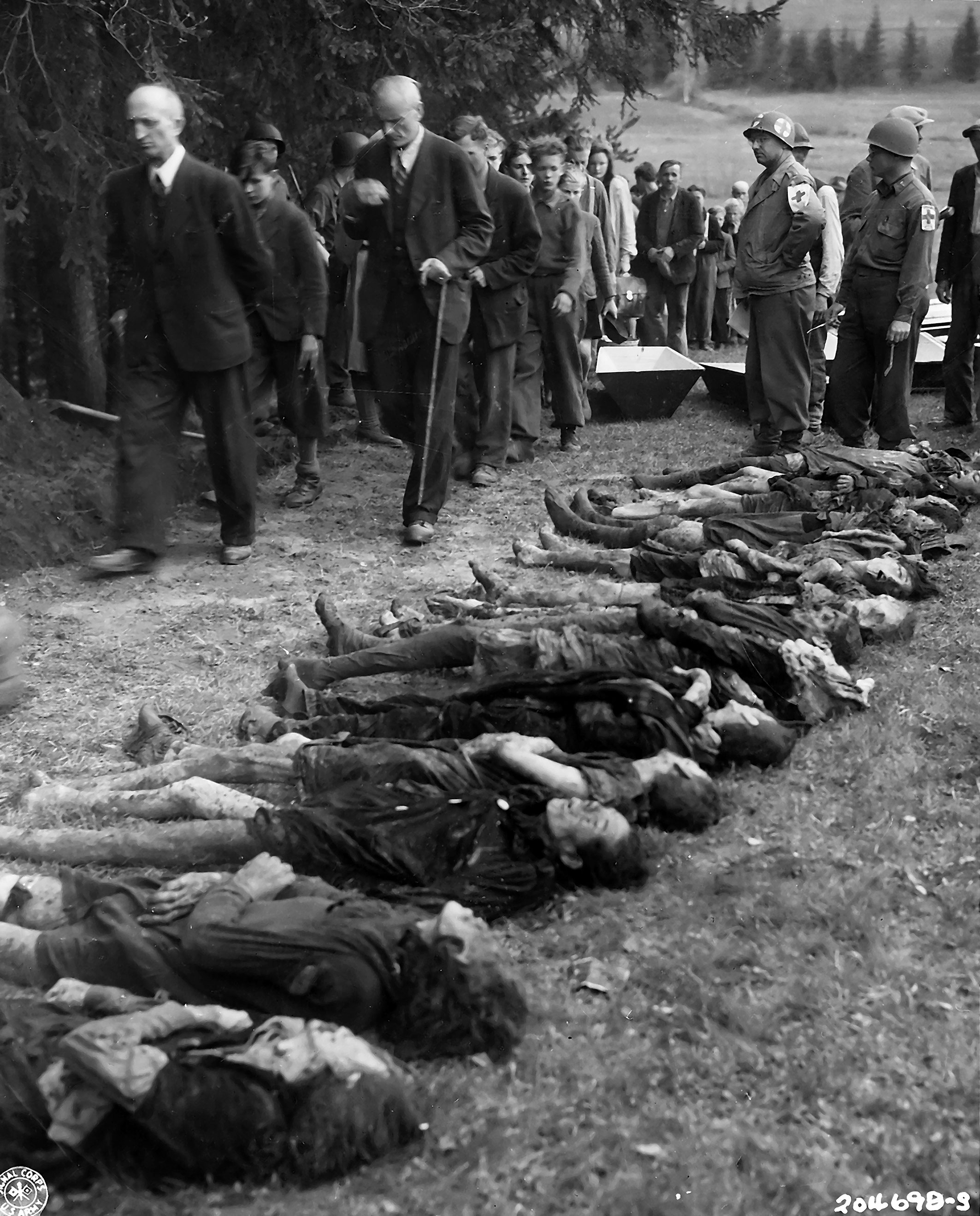
11 May 1945: German civilians are forced to walk past the bodies of 30 Jewish women starved to death by German SS troops in a 500-kilometre (300 mi) march across Czechoslovakia from Helmbrechts concentration camp. Buried in shallow graves in Volary, Czechoslovakia, the bodies were exhumed by German civilians working under the direction of Medics of the 5th Infantry Division, U.S. Third Army. The bodies were later placed in coffins and reburied in the cemetery in Volary.

==== Casualties ====
- Total battle casualties: 12,818
- Killed in action: 2,298
- Wounded in action: 9,549
- Missing in action: 288
- Prisoner of war: 683

==== Medal of Honor recipients ====
- Harold A. Garman

=== Cold War II ===
Following World War II, the 5th Infantry Division was inactivated on 20 September 1946 at Camp Campbell (now Fort) Kentucky. However, the division was reactivated on 15 July 1947 under Brigadier General John H. Church. From 1951 to 1953, the division was stationed at Fort Indiantown Gap, Pennsylvania, and trained 30,000 replacements for the Korean War. In 1954, the division was reflagged from the 43rd Infantry Division and stationed in West Germany as part of the U.S. contribution to NATO, though the division later returned to the United States.

==== Vietnam War ====
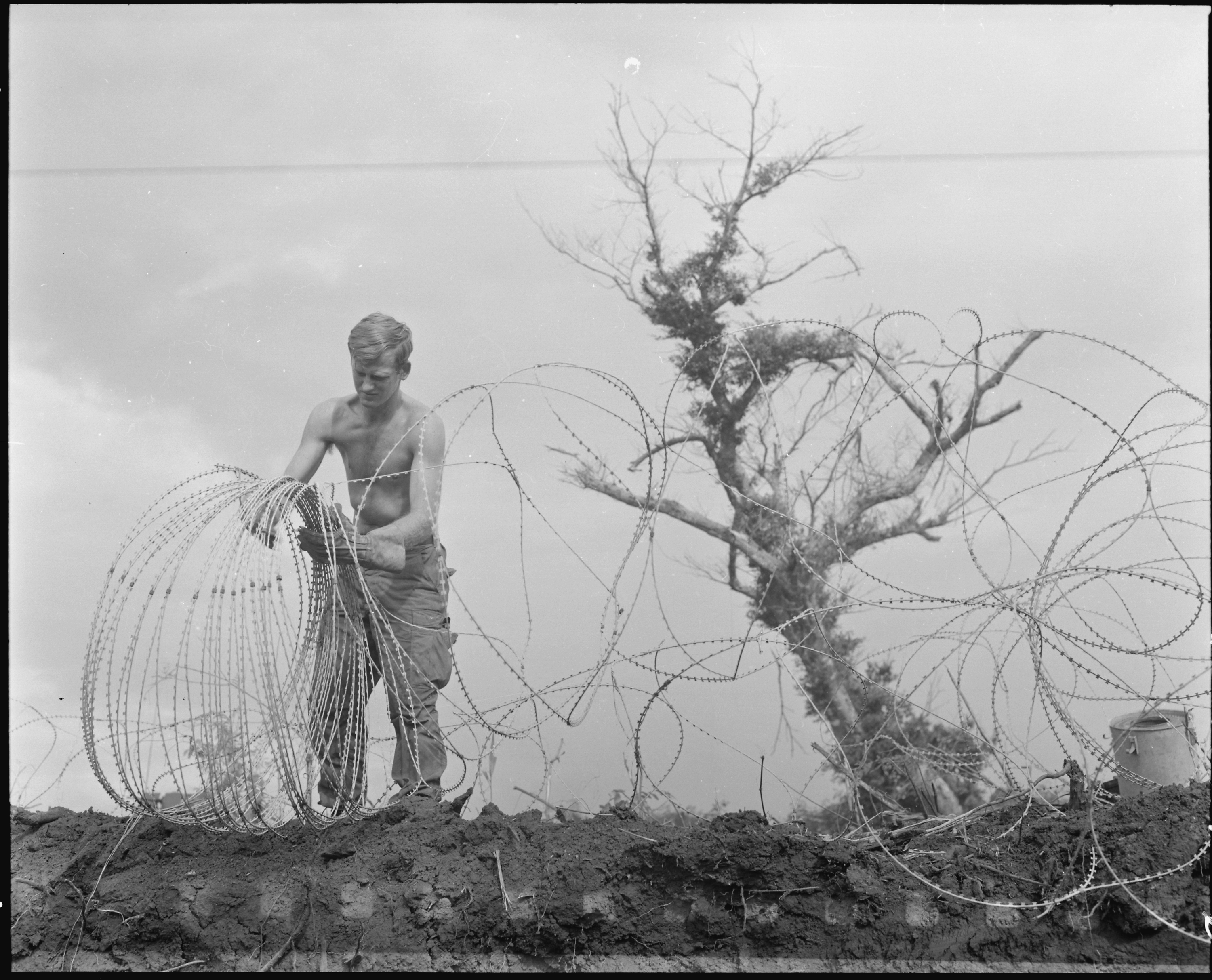
Vietnam, 1969. A member of the 1st Brigade, 5th Infantry Division (Mechanized), takes down barbed tape.

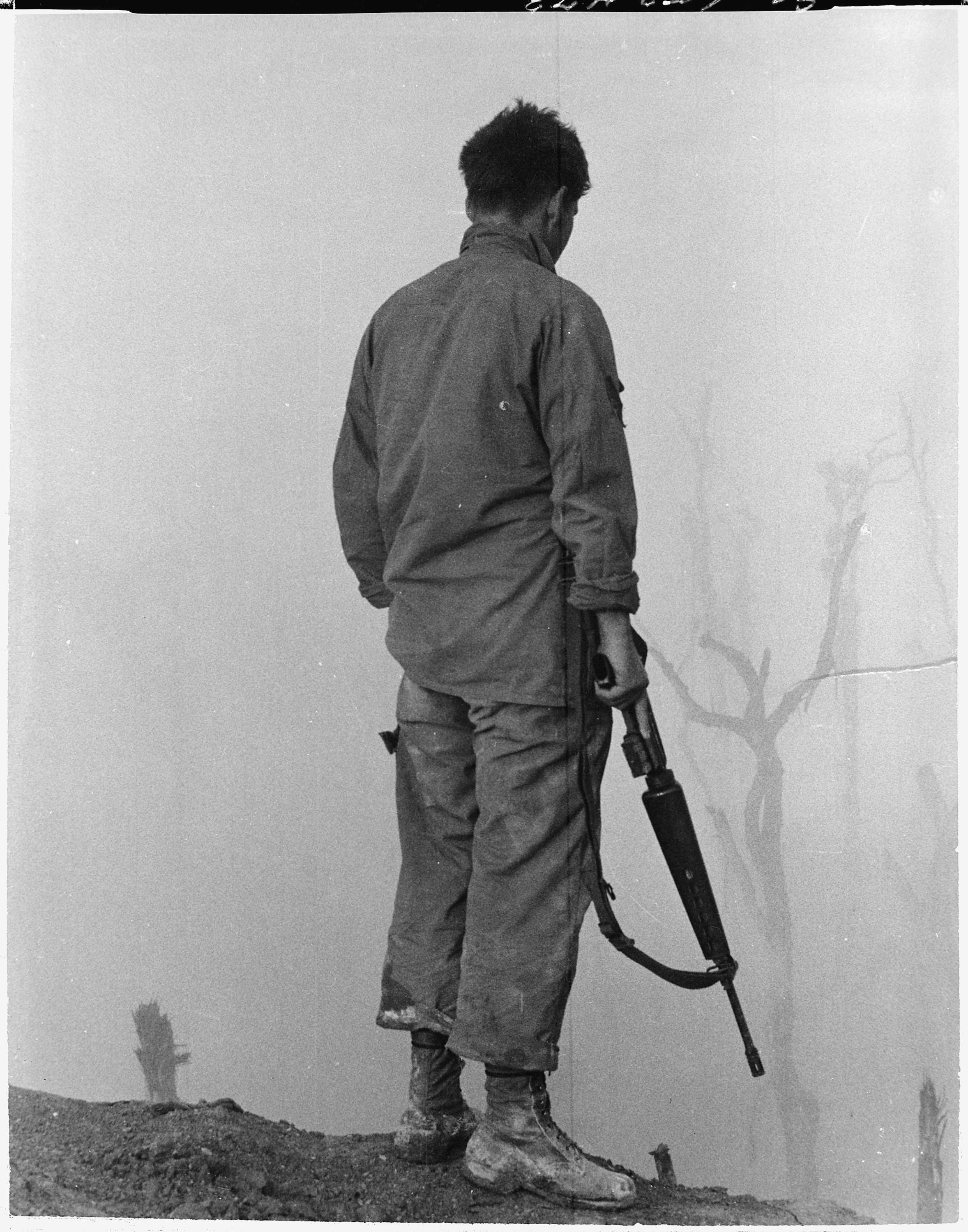
Vietnam, 1971. A member of the 1st Brigade, 5th Infantry Division (Mechanized), looks out over a fog-shrouded valley at Lang Vei during Operation Lam Son 719.

When the 1st Infantry Division deployed to South Vietnam in 1965, additional maneuver battalions were required; thus two infantry battalions from the 2nd Brigade, 5th Infantry Division, at Fort Devens in Massachusetts were relieved and assigned to "The Big Red One." In September 1965, the 2nd Brigade, 5th Infantry Division was moved, minus personnel, to Fort Carson in Colorado and refilled there. The remaining personnel at Fort Devens formed the basis of the 196th Infantry Brigade.

By 1968 the division was stationed at Fort Carson, Colorado, as a mechanized formation. 1st Brigade, 5th Infantry Division was dispatched to South Vietnam after the Tet Offensive to replace a U.S. Marine Corps unit. The brigade, consisting of one battalion each of infantry, mechanized infantry and armor, served there from July 1968 until 1971 defending the Vietnamese Demilitarized Zone in northern Quảng Trị Province. Combat units included 1st Battalion, 11th Infantry; 1st Battalion, 61st Infantry (Mechanized); 1st Battalion, 77th Armor; A Troop, 4th Squadron, 12th Cavalry; and 5th Battalion, 4th Artillery, A Company, 7th Engineer Battalion (Society of the Fifth Division). On 22 August 1971, the colors of 1st Brigade, 5th Infantry Division were cased and the brigade was inactivated at Fort Carson. Its final assignment was to III Corps, with the mission of reinforcing Europe if a general war was to break out there. In September 1969 the 4th Brigade, 5th Infantry Division was activated at Fort Carson, although, on the later return of 4th Infantry Division home from Vietnam in December 1970, the 4th Division replaced the 5th Division at Fort Carson, whereupon the 5th Division was inactivated.

==== Post-Vietnam ====
On 21 October 1974 the 1st Brigade, 5th Infantry Division was reactivated at Fort Polk in Louisiana as part of the Army's new 24-division force. Due to lack of sufficient housing, the brigade initially only had two maneuver battalions. (Maneuver and Firepower, Chap XIII) The division base and a second brigade was organized in 1975–77, and the Louisiana Army National Guard's 256th Infantry Brigade was assigned as the 'round-out' third brigade of the division.

In 1989, units of the 5th Division, based at Fort Polk deployed in support of Operation Nimrod Dancer to protect American interests in Panama. First Battalion, 61st Infantry (Mechanized), "Roadrunners" (1st Brigade, 5th ID) was one of the first reinforcing units and remained there until September when there was a hand over to 4th Battalion, Sixth Infantry (Mechanized), "Regulars" (2nd Brigade, 5th ID). 4–6 Infantry was in country and assisted during United States invasion of Panama (Operation "Just Cause") helping to overthrow Panamanian leader Manuel Noriega, and also assisted in an emergency extraction of Delta Force operators engaged in Operation Acid Gambit when their helicopter went down. Corporal Ivan M. Perez and PVT Kenneth D. Scott were killed in action from the 5th Infantry Division during Just Cause.

In August 1990, the 5th Division was alerted to prepare for deployment in support of Operation Desert Shield, and the Louisiana Army National Guard's 256th Infantry Brigade was mobilized as the 'round-out' third brigade in November. The Division began sending units to train at Fort Hood, and established a division headquarters-forward (5ID-(Fwd)) at the Texas base to prepare for deployment. The plan was to get all elements of the 256th Brigade up to standards, and then complete a rotation at the National Training Center at Fort Irwin before the division deployed to Southwest Asia. 5th ID Forward immediately encountered problems with the 256th Brigade units, and training suffered as a result. Several members of the 256th Brigade went AWOL, while others refused to train as directed. These delays prevented the Division from deploying to Fort Irwin, and the subsequent rapid start and end of Operation Desert Storm effectively kept the Division from ultimately deploying to Southwest Asia in any capacity. All units returned to Fort Polk by March 1991, with the 256th Brigade demobilization occurring later in May of that same year.

The 5th Division remained at Fort Polk until it was inactivated and reflagged as the 2nd Armored Division November 1992.

==== Units in 1990 ====
15 DEC 1990

- Headquarters, 5th Infantry Division
- 1st Brigade
  - 5-6th Infantry Regiment
  - 1-70th Armor Regiment
  - 4-35th Armor Regiment
- 2nd Brigade
  - 3-6th Infantry Regiment
  - 4-6th Infantry Regiment
  - 3-70th Armor Regiment
  - 2-152nd Armor Regiment(AL NG)
- 256th Brigade (LA NG)
  - 1-156th Armor Regiment
  - 2-156th Infantry Regiment
  - 3-156th Infantry Regiment
- Aviation Brigade
  - 3-1st Cavalry Regiment
    - E Troop, 256th Cavalry (LA NG)
  - 1-5th Aviation Regiment (Attack)
  - 3-5th Aviation Regiment (Assault)
- Division Artillery (DIVARTY)
  - 4-1st Field Artillery Regiment
  - 5-1st Field Artillery Regiment
  - 1-141st Field Artillery Regiment(LA NG)
  - 9-1st Field Artillery Regiment (Provisional)
    - C Battery, 21st Field Artillery Regiment (MLRS)
    - H Battery, 25th Field Artillery Regiment (Target Acquisition)
    - 45th Chemical Company
- Division Support Command (DISCOM)
  - 705th Support Battalion
  - 105th Support Battalion
  - 5th Support Battalion
  - 199th Support Battalion (LA NG)
  - F Co, 5th Aviation Regiment (AVIM)
- Division Troops
  - 5th Signal Battalion
  - 3-3rd Air Defense Artillery Regiment
  - 105th Military Intelligence Battalion (CEWI)
  - 7th Engineer Battalion
    - 256th Engineer Company (LA NG)
  - 5th MP Company
  - 5th ID Band

(9/1 FA (Prov) and its subordinate units retained their unit designations when the division reflagged as the 2nd Armored Division and moved to Fort Hood, TX)

=== Inactivation ===
The division was inactivated for the final time on 24 November 1992, and reflagged as the U.S. 2nd Armored Division as part of the post-Cold War drawdown of U.S. forces. The 2nd Armored Division moved from Fort Polk to Fort Hood in 1993, with the majority of the 5th Division's equipment.

Though it was inactivated, the division was identified as the third highest priority inactive division in the United States Army Center of Military History's lineage scheme due to its numerous accolades and long history. All of the division's flags and heraldic items were moved to the National Infantry Museum at Fort Benning, Georgia, following its inactivation. Should the U.S. Army decide to activate more divisions in the future, the center will most likely suggest the first new division be the 9th Infantry Division, the second be the 24th Infantry Division, the third be the 5th Infantry Division, and the fourth be the 2nd Armored Division.

== Commanders ==
(Partial list)

World War I

1. COL William M. Morrow, 1 Dec 1917 – 11 Dec 1917
2. MG Charles H. Muir, 12 Dec 1917 – 12 Dec 1917
3. COL William M. Morrow, 13 Dec 1917 – 31 Dec 1917
4. MG John E. McMahon, 1 Jan 1918 – 16 Oct 1918
5. MG Hanson E. Ely, 17 Oct 1918 – 22 Jul 1919
6. BG Wilds P. Richardson, 28 Oct 1919 – 15 Mar 1920
7. MG William L. Sibert, 1 March 1920 – 3 April 1920
8. MG David C. Shanks, 1 May 1920 – 1 Sep 1920
9. MG John L. Hines, 27 Sep 1920 – 7 Jul 1921
10. BG Ulysses G. McAlexander, 13 Jul 1921 – 4 Oct 1921

Inactivated October 1921; reactivated October 1939

1. BG Campbell B. Hodges, 24 Oct 1939 – 3 Sep 1940
2. MG Joseph M. Cummins, 4 Sep 1940 – 23 Jul 1941
3. MG Charles H. Bonesteel, 24 Jul 1941 – 19 Aug 1941
4. MG Cortlandt Parker, 20 Aug 1941 – 23 June 1943
5. BG Alan D. Warnock, 24 Jun 1943 – 2 Jul 1943
6. MG S. Leroy Irwin, 3 Jul 1943 – 20 Apr 1945
7. MG Albert E. Brown, 21 Apr 1945 – 20 Jun 1946
8. BG Harry B. Sherman, 20 Jun 1946 – 20 Jul 1946
9. MG Jens A. Doe, 20 Jul 1946 – 20 Sep 1946

Reactivation under 1947 organization

1. BG John H. Church, 15 Jul 1947 – 1 Oct 1947
2. MG William B. Kean, 2 Oct 1947 – 30 Jun 1948
3. MG George H. Decker, 1 Jul 1948 – 28 Feb 1950
4. BG Frank C. McConnell, 1 Mar 1950 – 30 Apr 1950

Reactivation as Korean War training unit

1. COL Thomas J. Wells, 4 Mar 1951 – 20 Mar 1951
2. MG Laurence B. Keiser, 21 Mar 1951 – 30 Nov 1952
3. MG George B. Barth, 1 Dec 1952 – 1 Sep 1953
4. MG Richard C. Partridge, 25 May 1954 – 30 Jun 1955
5. MG William T. Sexton, 1 Jul 1955 – 28 Feb 1956
6. BG Hiram D. Ives, 1 Mar 1956 – 30 Apr 1956
7. BG Cyrus A. Dolph III, 1 May 1956 – 30 June 1956
8. MG Gilman C. Mudgett, 1 Jul 1956 – 31 May 1957
9. BG William M. Breckinridge, 1 Feb 1957 – 1 Jun 1957

Reactivation under ROAD as 5th Infantry Division (Mechanized)

1. MG Ashton H. Manhart, 19 Feb 1962 – 10 Dec 1962
2. BG Joseph R. Russ, 11 Dec 1962 – 28 Jan 1963
3. MG John A. Heintges, 29 Jan 1963 – 15 Jul 1964
4. BG Milburn N. Huston, 16 Jul 1964 – 30 Jul 1964
5. MG Autrey J. Maroun, 1 Aug 1964 – 30 Nov 1966
6. MG Charles A. Corcoran, 1 Dec 1966 – 30 Apr 1968
7. MG Donald H. McGovern, 1 May 1968 – 2 Jun 1968
8. MG Roland M. Gleszer, 3 Jun 1968 – 17 Sep 1969
9. MG Bernard W. Rogers, 18 Sep 1969 – 9 Dec 1970

Division inactivated

Division reactivated at Fort Polk, Louisiana, in 1974

1. MG Charles E. Spragins, 1 Mar 1974 – 7 Jan 1975
2. MG Robert Haldane, 7 Jan 1975 – 31 Oct 1976
3. MG William B. Steele, 1 Nov 1976 – 19 Dec 1978
4. MG Joseph T. Palastra, 20 Dec 1978 – 5 July 1981
5. MG Edward C. Peter II, 6 Jul 1981 – 12 Jul 1983
6. MG Dale A. Vesser, 13 Jul 1983 – 17 Jun 1985
7. MG Kenneth C. Leuer, 26 Jun 1985 – 27 May 1987
8. MG James R. Taylor, 28 May 1987 – 4 June 1989
9. MG Thomas P. Carney, 5 Jun 1989 – 17 Jul 1990
10. MG William W. Crouch, 18 Jul 1990 – 16 Jun 1992
11. MG Jared L. Bates, 17 Jun 1992 – 24 Nov 1992

Division inactivated

== In popular culture ==
In the Axis & Allies miniatures role-playing game, a U.S. infantry unit was designated "Red Devil Captain."

In the Twilight: 2000 role-playing game, players start out as members of the 5th ID in July 2000, after the division is overrun by Soviet and Polish units near Kalisz, Poland during a hypothetical World War III.

In the 1981 movie Taps, the Red Diamond patch of the 5ID is worn as a combat patch by an Army National Guard master sergeant, portrayed by Ronny Cox, who is the father of one of the cadets at the school, indicating he saw action with the 5ID in Vietnam years before the events in the film.

In the Bethesda Studios game Fallout 4, in the beginning section it is mentioned that the 5ID is stationed in Southeast Asia.

== Notes ==
- John B. Wilson, Maneuver and Firepower: The Evolution of Divisions and Separate Brigades, Center of Military History, United States Army, WASHINGTON, D. C., 1998
