= Joseph T. Palastra Jr. =

United States Army general

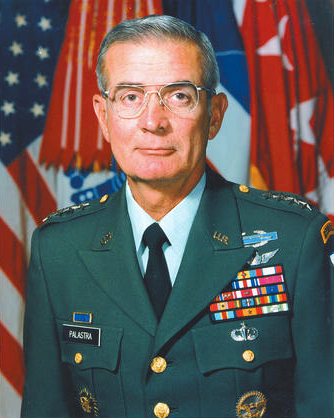
- General Joseph T. Palastra Jr.
- Born: 10 November 1931; Kittery, Maine
- Died: 3 March 2015 (aged 83); Highlandville, Missouri
- Military career
- Allegiance: United States
- Branch: United States Army
- Service years: 1954–1989
- Rank: General
- Commands: United States Army Forces Command; I Corps; 5th Infantry Division (Mechanized); 3rd Brigade, 101st Airborne Division; 1st Battalion, 12th Infantry Regiment
- Conflicts: Vietnam War
- Awards: Defense Distinguished Service Medal (2); Army Distinguished Service Medal; Silver Star; Legion of Merit; Bronze Star Medal (3)

Joseph Thomas Palastra Jr. (10 November 1931 – 3 March 2015) was a United States Army four-star general who served as Commanding General, United States Army Forces Command from 1986 to 1989. During his tenure, in 1987, the title was changed to Commander in Chief, Forces Command. He was inducted into the Ranger Hall of Fame, class of 2010.

== Military career ==
A native of New Hampshire, Palastra began his career as a second lieutenant after graduating from the United States Military Academy in 1954. Palastra also holds a Master of Business Administration from Auburn University. His military education includes the Infantry Officer Basic and Advanced Courses, the United States Army Command and General Staff College and the Air War College.

Palastra commanded I Corps and Fort Lewis, Washington. His other key assignments include Commanding General, 5th Infantry Division (Mechanized) and Fort Polk, Louisiana; Chief of Staff, Eighth United States Army/United States Forces Korea; and Deputy Commander in Chief/Chief of Staff, United States Pacific Command, Camp H.M. Smith, Hawaii.

In 1968 and 1969 Palastra served in Vietnam as Commander, B Company, 4th Aviation Battalion, and as Commander, 1st Battalion, 12th Infantry Regiment, in Vietnam's highlands. Palastra was a war-plans staff officer in the Office of the Deputy Chief of Staff for Military Operations, Washington, D.C., and, after attending the Air War College, returned to Washington to serve as a force structure analyst in the Office of the Chief of Staff.

Palastra has also commanded the 3rd Brigade of the 101st Airborne Division at Fort Campbell, Kentucky, and served as Deputy Director for Estimates in the Defense Intelligence Agency.

== Awards and decorations ==
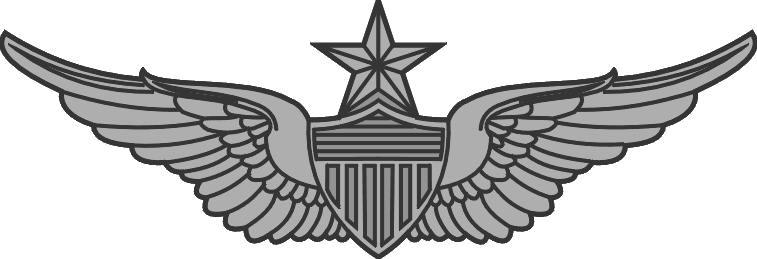
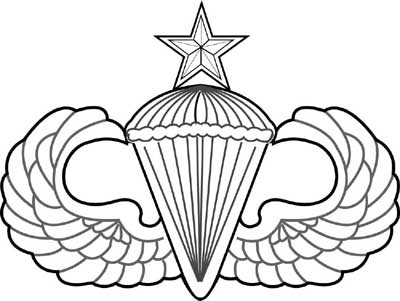
Combat Infantryman Badge
Army Senior Aviator Badge
Ranger tab
Senior Parachutist Badge
Office of the Secretary of Defense Identification Badge
Army Staff Identification Badge

Defense Distinguished Service Medal with one bronze oak leaf cluster
Army Distinguished Service Medal
Silver Star
Legion of Merit
Bronze Star with "V" device and two oak leaf clusters
Meritorious Service Medal with oak leaf cluster
Air Medal with bronze award numeral 8
Army Presidential Unit Citation
National Defense Service Medal with one bronze service star
Armed Forces Expeditionary Medal with one service star
Army Service Ribbon
Army Overseas Service Ribbon
Vietnam Gallantry Cross with bronze star
Vietnam Campaign Medal

Palastra was married to the former Anne Rich. They have a son and four daughters. He died in 2015 in Highlandville, Missouri where he lived.
