= Dale Vesser =

United States Army general (1932–2025)

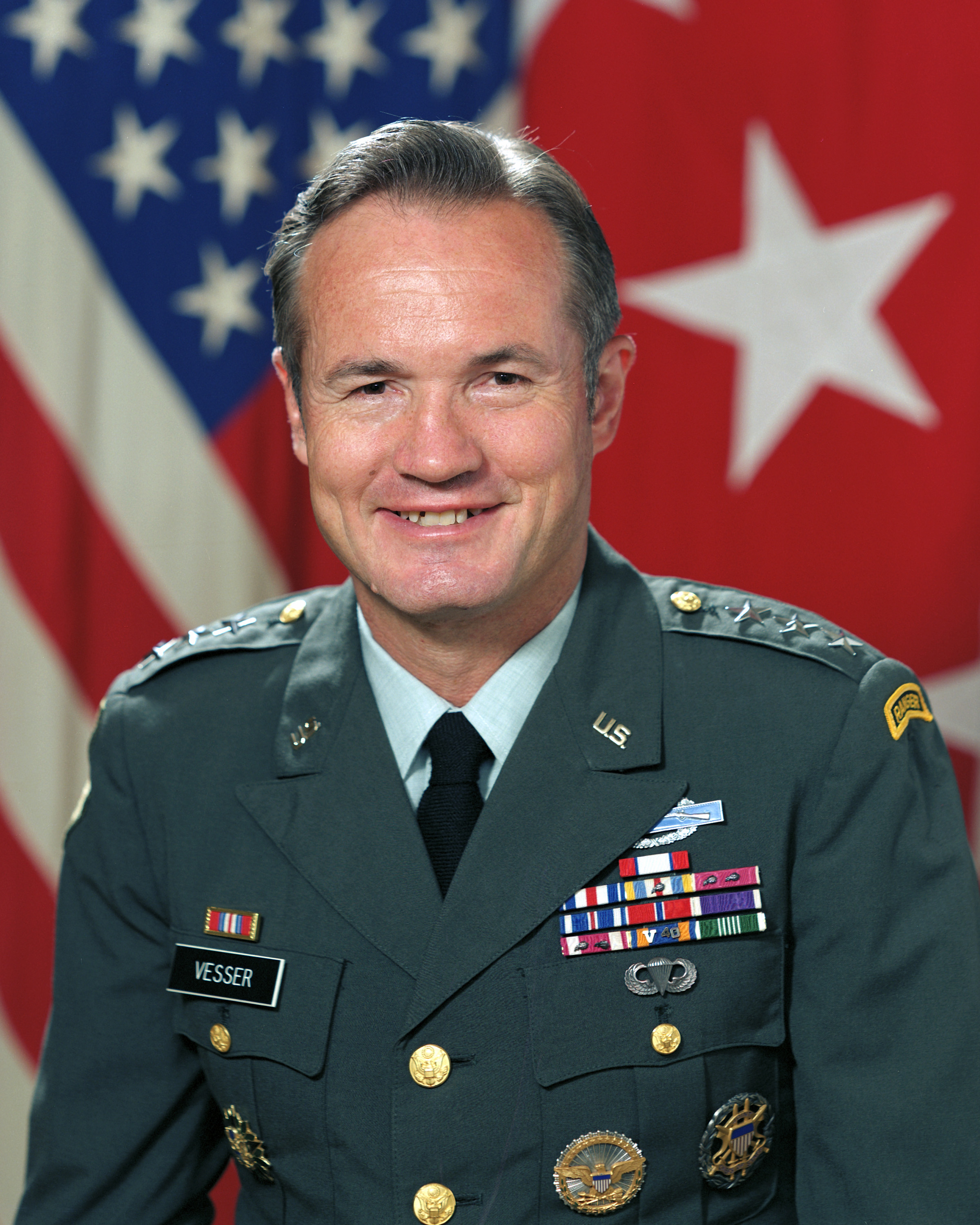
- Born: 10 September 1932; Los Angeles, California U.S.
- Died: 16 September 2025 (aged 93)
- Military career
- Allegiance: United States
- Branch: United States Army
- Service years: 1954–1987
- Rank: Lieutenant General
- Commands: 5th Infantry Division; Director for Strategic Plans and Policy (J-5)
- Conflicts: Vietnam War
- Awards: Defense Distinguished Service Medal; Army Distinguished Service Medal (2); Silver Star Medal; Defense Superior Service Medal (2); Legion of Merit (3); Distinguished Flying Cross; Bronze Star Medal; Meritorious Service Medal (3); Purple Heart; Air Medal (40)

Dale Allen Vesser (10 September 1932 – 16 September 2025) was a lieutenant general in the United States Army. He served as Director for Strategic Plans and Policy (J-5) for the Joint Chiefs of Staff from 1985 until his retirement in 1987.

== Biography ==
Vesser was commissioned in 1954 after graduation from the United States Military Academy with a B.S. degree in military science. Awarded a Rhodes Scholarship, he completed a B.A. degree in political science at Oxford University in 1957. Vesser also earned an M.A. degree in economics from Oxford University.

He served in Vietnam from 1966 to 1967 and again from 1970 to 1971. He was awarded the Silver Star, Distinguished Flying Cross, Bronze Star, Purple Heart and 40 Air Medals. Vesser also received the Defense Distinguished Service Medal, two Army Distinguished Service Medals, two Defense Superior Service Medals, three awards of the Legion of Merit and three Meritorious Service Medals.

After retirement from active duty, Vesser served during the George H. W. Bush administration as Assistant Under Secretary of Defense for Resources and Plans.

Vesser died from cancer at home, on 16 September 2025, at the age of 93.
