= John Cogswell Oakes =

United States Army general (1906–1982)

John C. Oakes
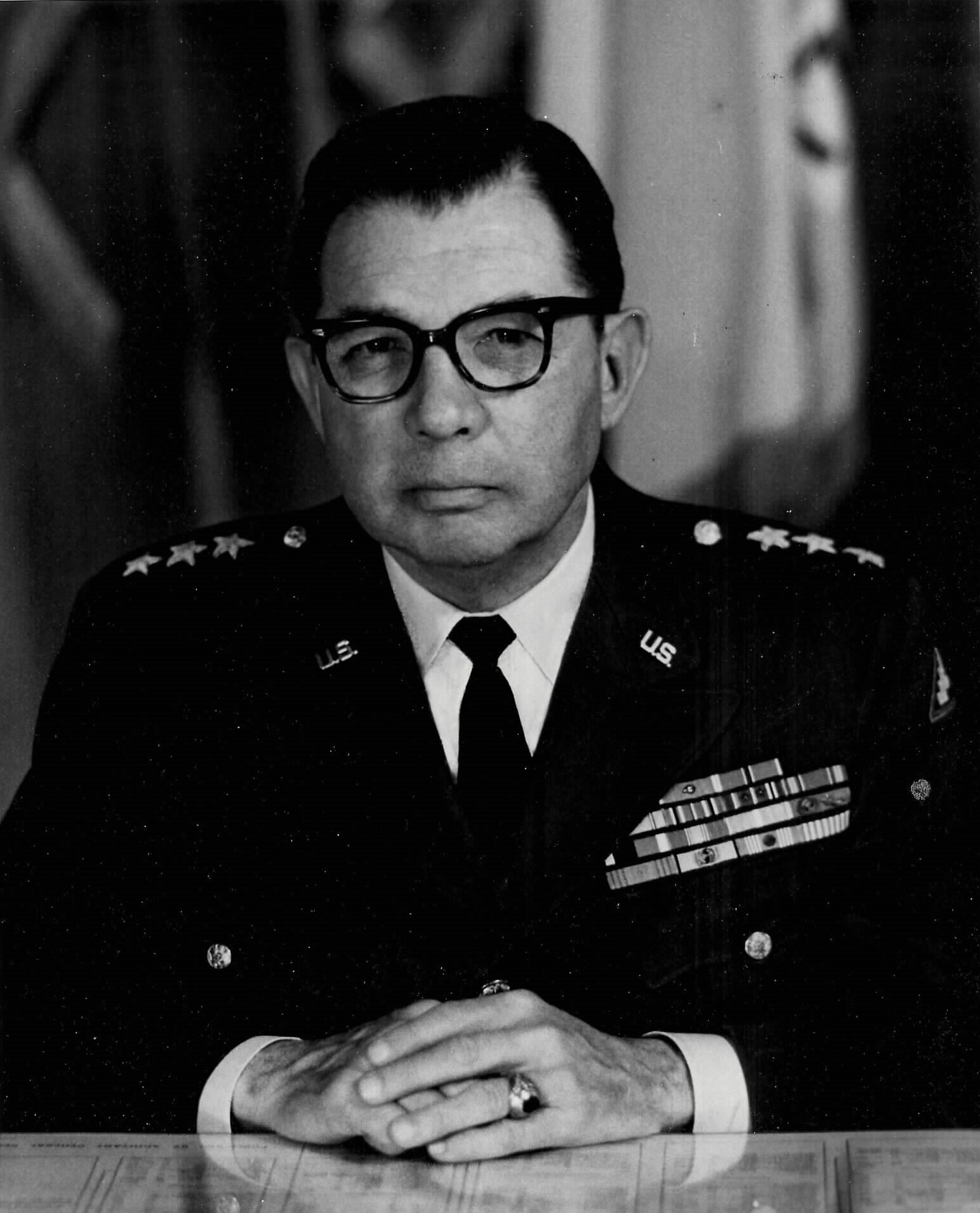
- Born: 16 October 1906; Galveston, Texas, US
- Died: 30 August 1982 (aged 75); Washington, D.C., US
- Relatives: Robert B. Hawley (maternal grandfather)
- Military career
- Branch: United States Army
- Service years: 1928–1963
- Rank: Lieutenant General
- Commands: Seventh Army; VII Corps; 25th Infantry Division (Acting); 25th Infantry Division Artillery
- Conflicts: World War II; Korean War
- Awards: Distinguished Service Medal; Legion of Merit (2); Bronze Star Medal

Lieutenant General John Cogswell Oakes (16 October 1906 – 30 August 1982) was a United States Army officer who served as Commanding General of VII Corps from 1961 to 1962 and as Commanding General, Seventh Army from 1962 to 1963.

== Career ==
Oakes as a United States Military Academy cadet c. 1928

Born in Galveston, Texas, Oakes was a 1928 graduate of the United States Military Academy. A career field artillery officer, he served as executive officer of the XIII Corps Artillery at Fort Dix and Fort Bragg and then in France, Holland and Germany during World War II. After the war, Oakes was sent to study at the Army Command and General Staff College in 1945, graduating in 1946. In the summer of 1948, he was assigned to an advisory mission in Greece during the Greek Civil War. After this, Oakes was sent to study at the National War College in 1950, graduating in 1951.

Promoted to brigadier general in 1952, Oakes commanded the 25th Infantry Division Artillery in the Korean War from October 1953 to July 1954. He also served as acting division commander while Halley G. Maddox served as interim I Corps commander. This was followed by an assignment as Eighth Army chief of staff in Korea. Oakes next served as assistant chief of staff for operations, U.S. Army Europe and then as Seventh Army chief of staff.

Promoted to major general on 19 July 1957, Oakes served as deputy commanding general of the Seventh Army and then as Assistant Deputy Chief of Staff for Military Operations at the Pentagon. Promoted to lieutenant general on 1 November 1959, he served as Deputy Chief of Staff for Military Operations until 19 January 1961. Oakes later served as VII Corps and Seventh Army commander. After suffering a heart attack, he retired from active duty in 1963.

== Personal ==
Oakes was the son of John Calvin Oakes and Sue Murray "Susie" (Hawley) Oakes, who were married in 1902. His father was a 1897 West Point graduate and military engineer who retired from the Army in 1927 as a colonel. His maternal grandfather was former U.S. Congressman Robert Bradley Hawley. His older brother Calvin Hawley Oakes (7 August 1904 – 18 July 1991) served as a foreign service officer from 1930 to 1946 and as a Southeast Asian specialist for the Central Intelligence Agency from 1947 to 1955.

Oakes married Margaret Disoway McKinley, a great-niece of former U.S. President William McKinley, in 1932. The couple had two sons and two daughters. Their son John Hawley Oakes (30 March 1934 – 23 May 2012) was a 1956 Military Academy graduate and artillery officer who retired from the Army as a colonel.

After retirement, Oakes and his wife moved to Washington, D.C. He died of congestive heart failure in 1982 at Walter Reed Hospital. Oakes was buried at Arlington National Cemetery on 2 September 1982. His wife was interred beside him on 10 January 1989.
