= VII Corps (United States) =

VII Army Corps
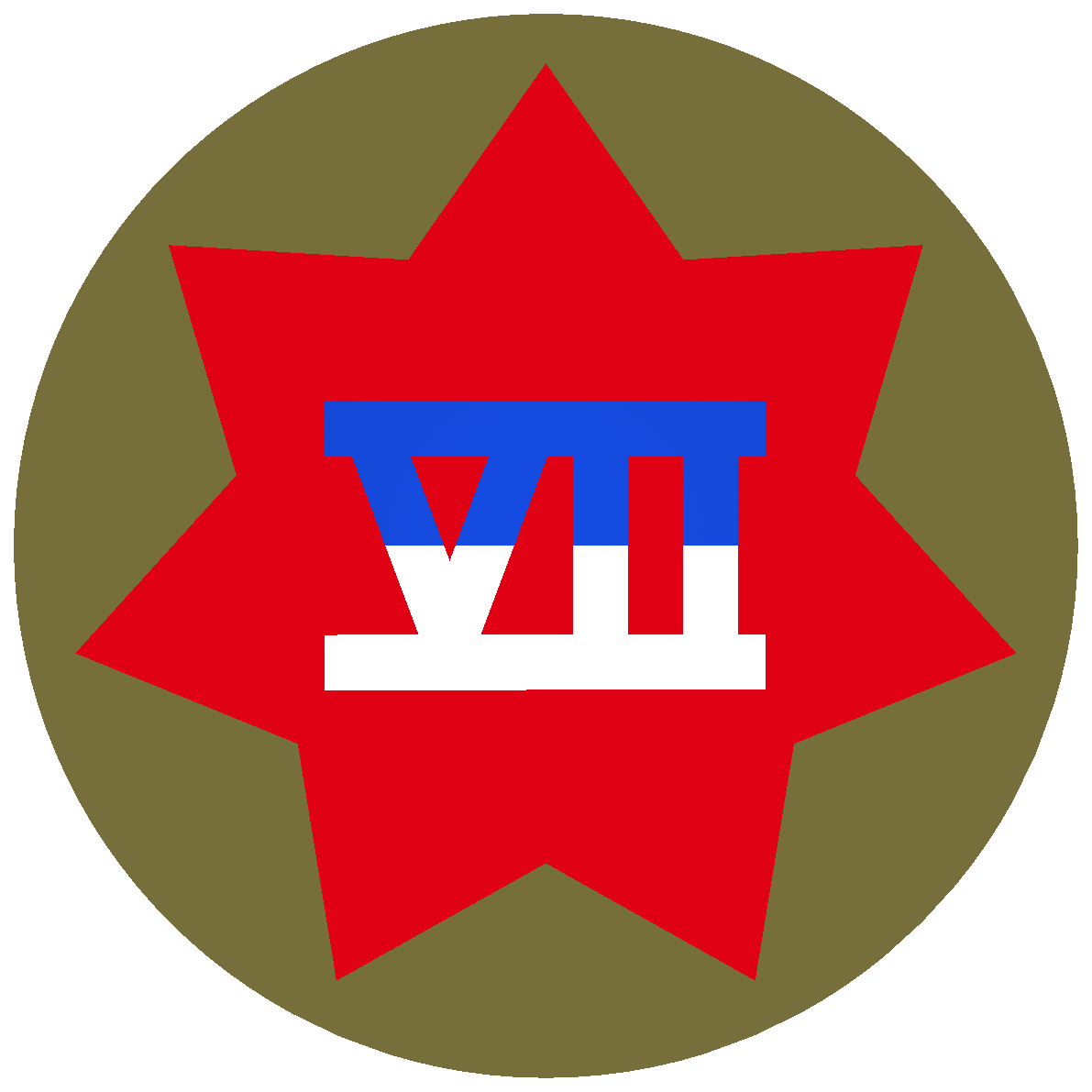
- Shoulder sleeve insignia of VII Corps
- Active: 19 August 1918–11 July 1919; 29 July 1921–18 October 1927; 27 June 1941–1 March 1946; 12 July 1950–15 April 1992
- Country: United States of America
- Branch: United States Army
- Role: Headquarters
- Size: Corps
- Nickname: The Jayhawk Corps
- Engagements: World War I; World War II; Normandy; Northern France; Rhineland; Ardennes-Alsace; Central Europe; Southwest Asia; Defense of Saudi Arabia; Liberation and Defense of Kuwait; Cease-Fire

Commanders
- Notable commanders: Robert C. Richardson Jr. J. Lawton Collins; Julius W. Becton Jr. John Galvin; Frederick M. Franks, Jr. James M. Gavin

Insignia
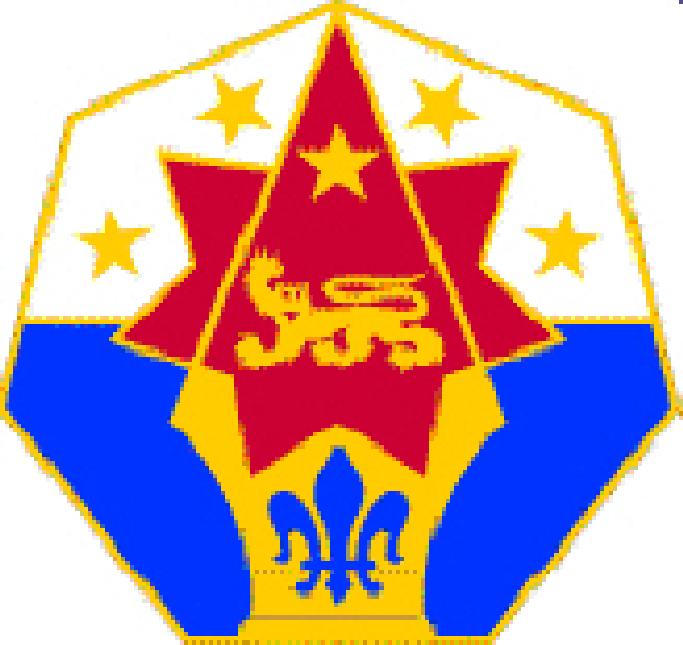
- Distinctive unit insignia

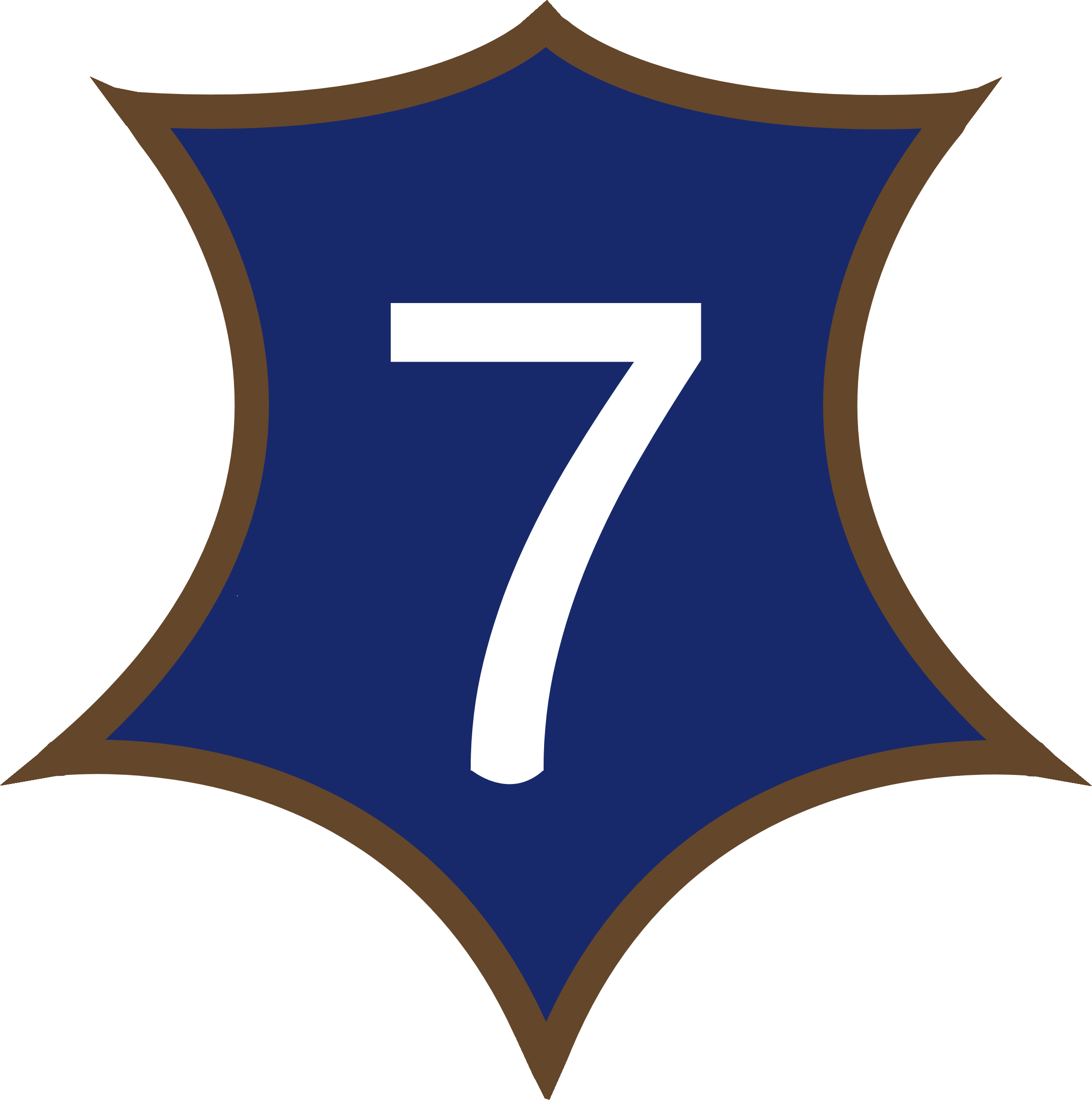
- Shoulder sleeve insignia prior to 28 April 1944

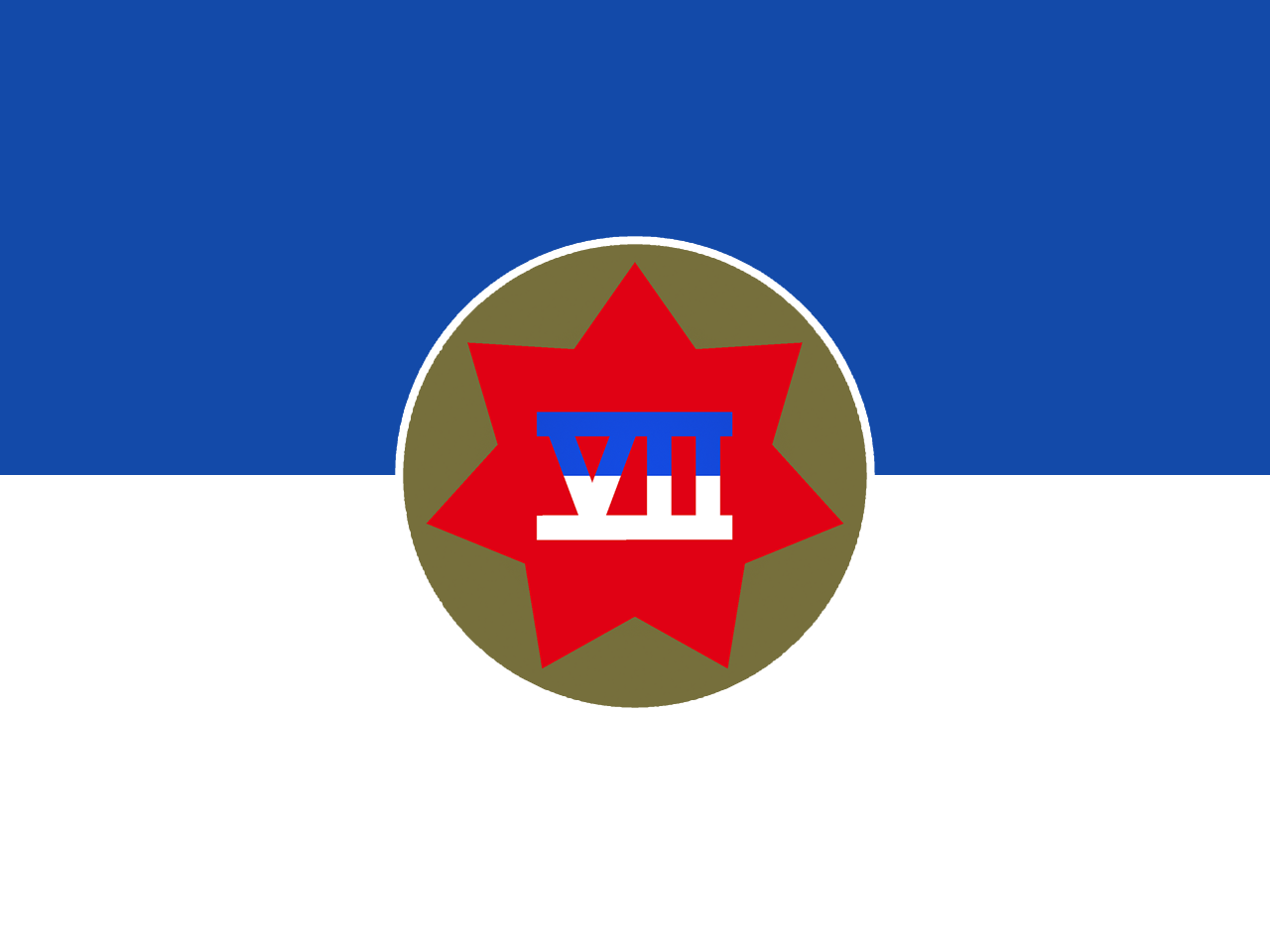
- VII Corps Flag

The VII Corps was a military formation of the United States Army. It was active on four occasions from 1918 to 1992. Activated in 1918 for World War I, it was reactivated for World War II and again during the Cold War. During both World War II and the Cold War it was subordinate to the Seventh Army, or USAREUR and was headquartered at Kelley Barracks in Stuttgart, West Germany, from 1951 until it was redeployed to the US after significant success in the Gulf War in 1991, then inactivated in 1992.

== World War I ==
VII Corps was organized at the end of World War I on 19 August 1918, at Remiremont, France and was inactivated on 11 July 1919. It was commanded by Major Generals William M. Wright, Omar Bundy, William G. Haan, and Henry Tureman Allen. It was composed of the 6th, 81st and 88th Divisions, and served in the Vosges Sector.

== Post-World War I ==
The VII Corps was constituted in the Organized Reserve on 29 July 1921, allotted to the Seventh Corps Area, and assigned to the Third Army. Per General Order #2, Headquarters, Seventh Corps Area, the corps headquarters was activated on 9 January 1922 at the Old Customhouse, 3rd and Olive Streets, St. Louis, Missouri, with Regular Army and Organized Reserve personnel. The corps headquarters was responsible for providing and planning administration, organization, supply, and training for army, corps, and other nondivisional Reserve units, less field and coast artillery, in the Seventh Corps Area. The headquarters was relieved from active duty on 27 January 1923 and all Regular Army personnel were reassigned to the Headquarters, Non-Divisional Group, Seventh Corps Area, which assumed the responsibilities previously held by the VII Corps. Both the corps headquarters and headquarters company remained active in the Organized Reserve.

The VII Corps headquarters was withdrawn from the Organized Reserve on 15 August 1927 and allotted to the Regular Army. As part of the four-army plan put into effect on 1 October 1933, the VII Corps was relieved from the Third Army and assigned to the Fourth Army. Concurrently, the VII Corps headquarters was partially activated at Omaha, Nebraska, with Regular Army personnel assigned to Headquarters, Seventh Corps Area, and Reserve personnel from the corps area at large. On the same date, the headquarters company, VII Corps, was withdrawn from the Organized Reserve and allotted to the Regular Army. As a "Regular Army Inactive" unit, the corps headquarters was organized provisionally for short periods using its assigned Reserve officers and staff officers from Headquarters, Seventh Corps Area. These periods included several Second Army command post exercises (CPXs) in the 1930s and that part of the Fourth Army maneuvers held at Camp Ripley, Minnesota, in August 1937. The designated mobilization station for the corps headquarters from 1927 to 1939 was Camp Pike, Arkansas, where it would assume command and control of its assigned subordinate corps troops, which would then be mobilizing primarily in the Seventh Corps Area. Although the 1939 Protective Mobilization Plan changed the mobilization station for the corps headquarters to Fort Snelling, Minnesota.

== World War II ==
The headquarters, VII Corps, was activated on 25 November 1940, less Reserve personnel, at Fort McClellan, Alabama; the headquarters company had been activated there two weeks before on 10 November. At Fort McClellan, the VII Corps assumed command and control of the 27th, 33rd, and 35th Divisions. The corps headquarters was transferred on 25 January 1941 to the Ramsey Building at 19th Street and North E Avenue, Birmingham, Alabama. The corps participated in the Tennessee Maneuvers in May–June 1941 and the Louisiana Maneuvers in September–October 1941 as part of the Second Army. After the Louisiana Maneuvers, the corps headquarters returned to Birmingham, where it was located on 7 December 1941. In late December 1941, VII Corps headquarters was moved to San Jose, California as part of the Western Defense Command and as it continued to train and prepare for deployment.

Its first return to continental Europe took place on D-Day in June 1944, as one of the two assault corps for the U.S. First Army during Operation Overlord, targeting Utah Beach via amphibious assault. For Overlord, the 82nd and 101st Airborne Divisions were attached to VII Corps. After the Battle of Normandy the airborne units were assigned to the newly created XVIII Airborne Corps. Subsequently, VII Corps participated in many battles during the advance across France; this included taking 25,000 German prisoners during the Battle of the Mons Pocket in early September 1944. The corps subsequently took part in the invasion of Germany until the surrender of the Third Reich in May 1945. The corps was inactivated in 1946.

=== Battle of Normandy ===
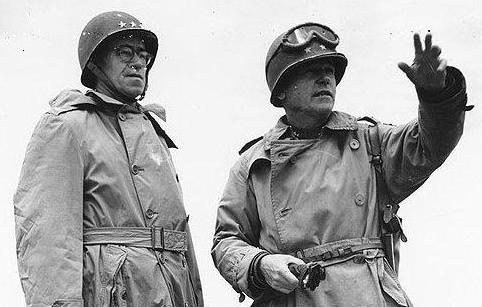
Major General J. Lawton Collins, VII Corps, describes the taking of Cherbourg to General Omar Bradley, First Army.

For the Normandy Operation, VII Corps was part of 21st Army Group under the command of General Bernard Montgomery and the U.S. First Army commanded by Lieutenant General Courtney Hodges. The Corps was commanded by Major General J. Lawton Collins.

VII Corps led the initial assault of Operation Cobra, the First Army-led offensive as part of the breakout of the Normandy area. Its success is credited with changing the war in France from high-intensity infantry combat to rapid maneuver warfare. Elements of VII Corps saw much combat in the Battle of the Hurtgen Forest.

==== Assigned Units and Commanders ====
- 4th Infantry Division, Major General Raymond O. Barton

8th Infantry Regiment Colonel James A. Van Fleet
12th Infantry Regiment Colonel Russell P. Reeder (11 June)

Lieutenant Colonel Hervey Tribolet

22nd Infantry Regiment Colonel Hervey A. Tribolet

Colonel Robert T. Foster (26 June)

- 9th Infantry Division, Major General Manton S. Eddy

39th Infantry Regiment Colonel Harry A. "Paddy" Flint
47th Infantry Regiment Colonel George W. Smythe
60th Infantry Regiment Colonel Frederick J. de Rohan

- 79th Infantry Division, Major General Ira T. Wyche

313th Infantry Regiment Colonel Sterling A. Wood
314th Infantry Regiment Colonel Warren A. Robinson
315th Infantry Regiment Colonel Porter P. Wiggins

Colonel Bernard B. McMahon (24 June)

- 82nd Airborne Division, Major General Matthew Ridgway

505th Parachute Infantry Regiment Colonel William E. Ekman
507th Parachute Infantry Regiment Colonel George V. Millett Jr.

Colonel Edson D. Raff (15 June)

508th Parachute Infantry Regiment Colonel Roy E. Lindquist
325th Glider Infantry Regiment Colonel Harry L. Lewis

- 90th Infantry Division, Brigadier General Jay W. MacKelvie

357th Infantry Regiment Colonel Philip De Witt Ginder

Colonel John W. Sheehy (13 June)
Lieutenant Colonel Charles M. Schwab (15 June)
Colonel George B. Barth (17 June)

358th Infantry Regiment Colonel James V. Thompson

Colonel Richard C. Partridge (16 June)

359th Infantry Regiment Colonel Clark K. Fales

- 101st Airborne Division, Major General Maxwell D. Taylor

501st Parachute Infantry Regiment Colonel Howard R. Johnson
502nd Parachute Infantry Regiment Colonel George Moseley Jr. (WIA 6 June)

Lieutenant Colonel John H. Michaelis (6 June)

506th Parachute Infantry Regiment Colonel Robert Sink
327th Glider Infantry Regiment Colonel George S. Wear

Colonel Joseph H. Harper (10 June)

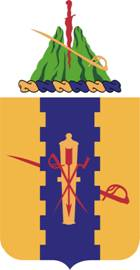
- 4th Cavalry Group (Mechanized), Colonel Joseph M. Tully

4th Cavalry Squadron Lieutenant Colonel E. C. Dunn
24th Cavalry Squadron Lieutenant Colonel F. H. Gaston, Jr.

- 6th Armored Group, Colonel Francis F. Fainter

70th Tank Battalion Lieutenant Colonel John C. Welborn
746th Tank Battalion Lieutenant Colonel C. G. Hupfer

Battle casualties, 6 June – 1 July 1944
Unit	Total	Killed	Wounded	Missing	Captured
All Units	22,119	2,811	13,564	5,665	79
4th Inf Division	5,452	844	3,814	788	6
9th Inf Division	5,438	301	2,061	76	0
79th Inf Division	2,438	240	1,896	240	0
90th Inf Division	2,376	386	1,979	34	0
82d A/B Div.	4,480	457	1,440	2,571	12
101st A/B Div.	4,670	546	2,217	1,907	0
Corps Troops	304	37	157	49	61

== Cold War ==
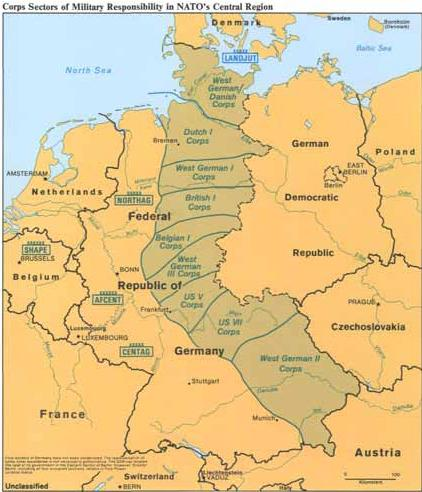
VII Corps Cold War NATO assignment

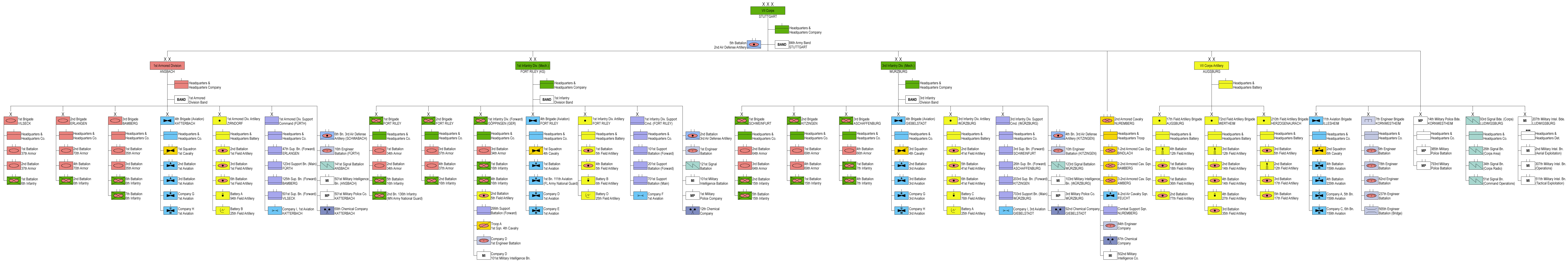
Organisation of VII Corps in 1989 (click to enlarge)

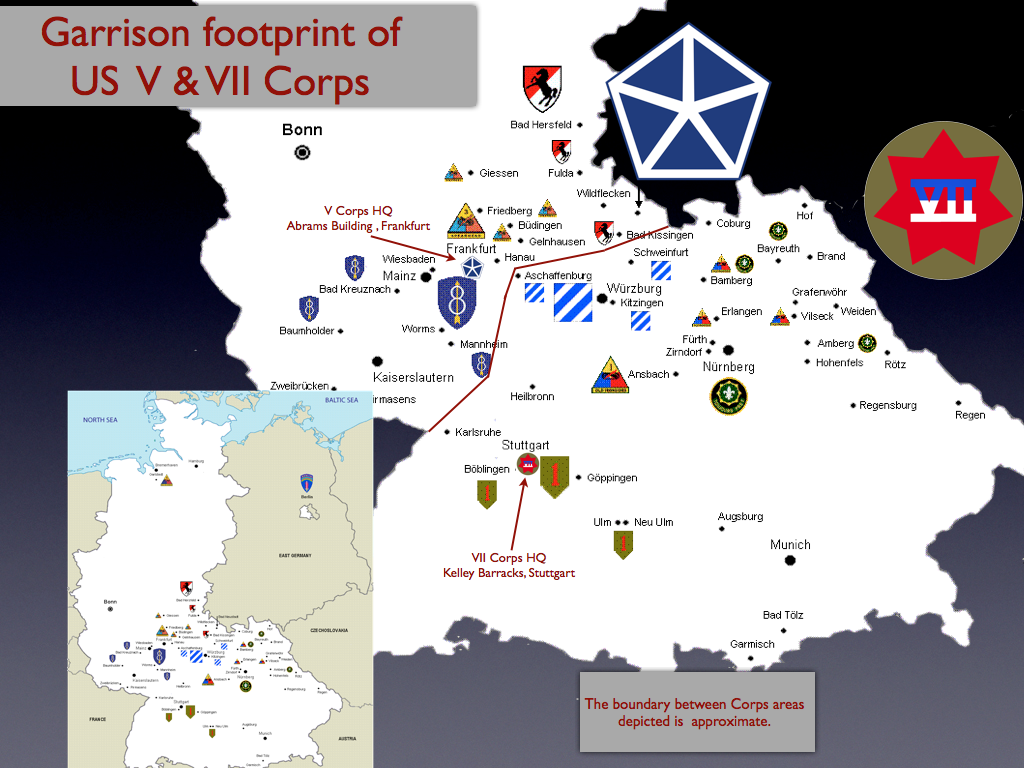
VII Corps Garrison Footprint in the 1980s

From reactivation in 1950 and throughout the Cold War, the corps guarded part of NATO's front with the Warsaw Pact. Headquartered in Stuttgart at Kelley Barracks it was one of the two main US combat formations in Germany along with V Corps, which was headquartered in Frankfurt am Main at Abrams Building.

As finally envisaged in the General Defense Plan circa 1989, the 1st Canadian Division with its main headquarters at Kingston, Ontario, would have been assigned to the Commander, Central Army Group's tactical reserve, fighting alongside either the German II Corps or VII Corps.

=== Structure 1989 ===
At the end of the Cold War in 1989 VII Corps consisted of the following units:

- VII Corps, Stuttgart, West Germany
  - 1st Armored Division, Ansbach
  - 1st Infantry Division (Mechanized), Fort Riley, Kansas (Exercise Reforger unit)
    - 1st Infantry Division (Forward), Göppingen, West Germany
  - 3rd Infantry Division (Mechanized), Würzburg
  - VII Corps Artillery, Augsburg
    - 17th Field Artillery Brigade, Augsburg
    - 72nd Field Artillery Brigade, Wertheim
    - 210th Field Artillery Brigade, Herzogenaurach
  - 2nd Armored Cavalry Regiment, Nuremberg
  - 11th Aviation Brigade, Illesheim
  - 7th Engineer Brigade, Kornwestheim
  - 14th Military Police Brigade, Kornwestheim
  - 93rd Signal Brigade (Corps), Ludwigsburg
  - 207th Military Intelligence Brigade, Ludwigsburg
  - 2nd Corps Support Command, Nellingen auf den Fildern
  - 602nd Air Support Operations Group, USAF Stuttgart

== Gulf War ==
VII Corps Gulf War Map.

After Saddam Hussein's troops invaded Kuwait in 1990, the corps was deployed to Saudi Arabia as part of the second major wave of deployments of American forces. Its presence took US forces in theatre from a force capable of defending Saudi Arabia to a force capable of ejecting Iraqi troops from Kuwait.

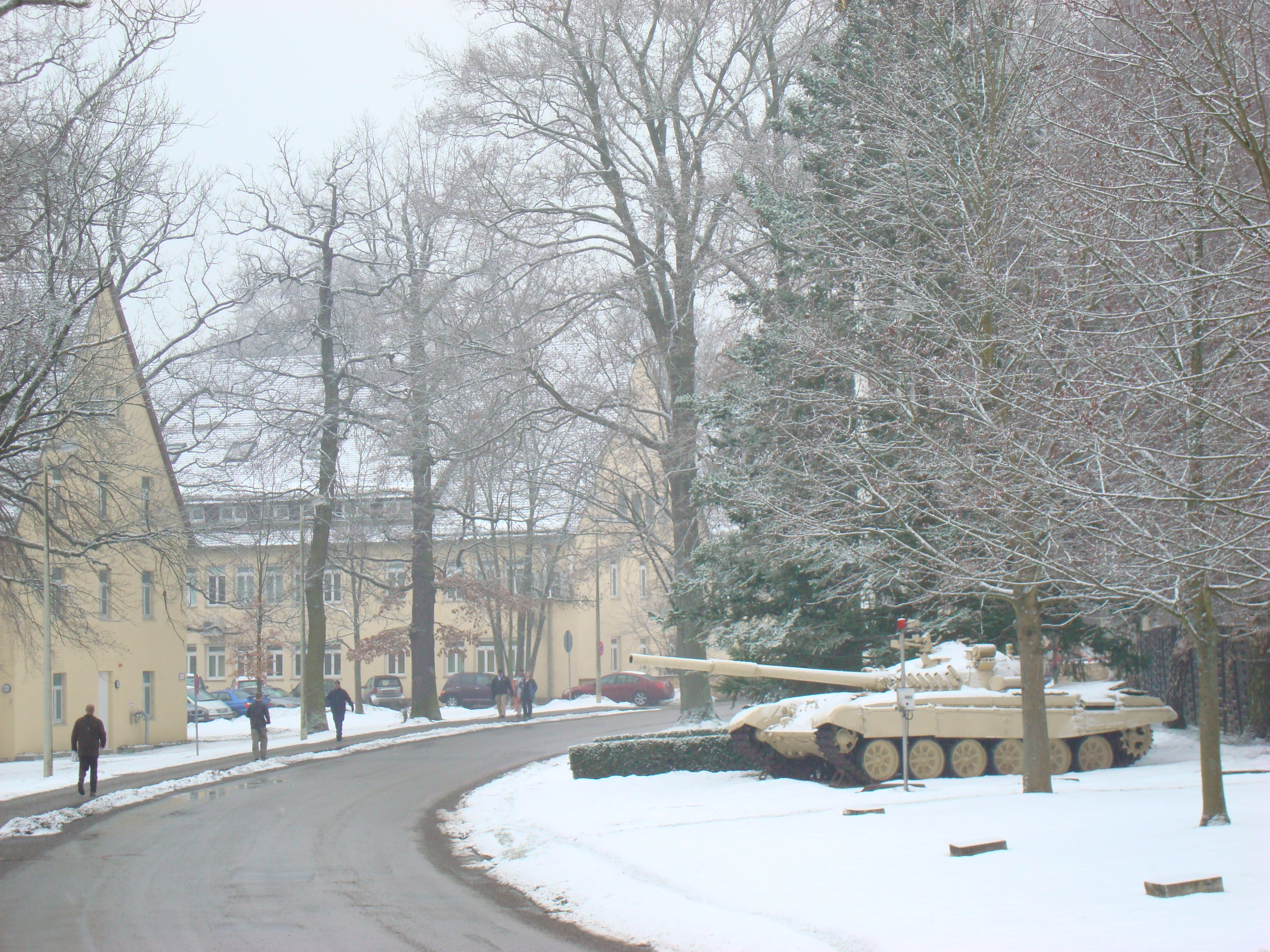
Captured Iraqi T-72 Tank at VII Corps Cold War HQ, Kelley Barracks.

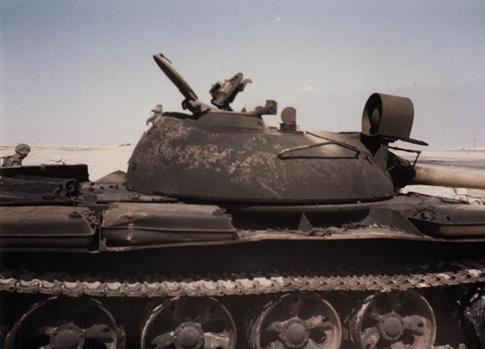
An Iraqi Republican Guard tank destroyed by Task Force 1-41 Infantry during the 1st Gulf War, February 1991.

In the Gulf War, VII Corps was probably the most powerful formation of its type ever to take to the battlefield. Normally, a corps commands three divisions when at full strength, along with other units such as artillery of various types, corps-level engineers and support units. However, VII Corps had far more firepower under its command. It consisted of 1,487 tanks, 1,384 infantry fighting vehicles, 568 artillery pieces, 132 MLRS, 8 missile launchers, and 242 attack helicopters. It had a total troop strength of 146,321 troops.

Its principal full-strength fighting formations were the 1st Armored Division (United States), the 3rd Armored Division (United States) and the 1st Infantry Division (United States). The 2nd Armored Division (Forward) was assigned to the 1st Infantry Division as its third maneuver brigade. In addition, the corps had the 2nd Cavalry Regiment (United States) to act as a scouting and screening force, and two further heavy divisions, the 1st Cavalry Division (United States) and the British 1st Armoured Division, as well as the 11th Aviation Group. Although both 1st Cavalry Division and 1st Armoured Division had only two maneuver brigades, they were still powerful formations in their own right.

VII Corps was originally deployed to provide an offensive option if needed. In the 100-hour war they were given a mission: To destroy the Iraqi Republican Guard's heavy divisions. That meant that the 1st Infantry Division had to make a forced entry to make room for the British attack on the right wing and to secure the main forces advance on the left. That attack force was led by the 2nd Armored Cavalry Regiment and Task Force 1-41 Infantry followed by the other two brigades of the 1st Infantry Division. The 1st Armored Division would head north to engage the Iraqi Republican Guard in the Battle of Medina Ridge. The 3rd Armored Division would protect the flank of the 1st Infantry Division. That gave VII Corps commander General Frederick M. Franks, Jr. a three division strike force to confront several Iraqi Armored Divisions. After the corps had turned 90 degrees east according to FRAGPLAN 7 and after the Cavalry Regiment had fought the single sided Battle of 73 Easting the three Divisions (plus the British on the right wing) fought one of the most one-sided battles in the history of the U.S. Army.

VII Corps advanced with U.S. XVIII Airborne Corps on its left wing and Arab forces on its right wing. It pulverized all Iraqi forces that tried to stand and fight and destroyed a good proportion of the Iraqi Republican Guard divisions. This confrontation was known as the Battle of Norfolk.

VII Corps' attack destroyed several divisions including the Medina and the Tawakalna Republican Guards division along with support units. It also destroyed most of the Iraqi VII Corps that had guarded the frontline as well as other units. The Battle of 73 Easting was later studied as a textbook armored battle by U.S. staff colleges. The cost in lives was 36 US and UK dead; trifling, in terms of expected casualties, for the war the two armies had trained for against the Soviets.

Virtually every manoeuvre battalion in the 1st and 3rd Armored Divisions, 1st Inf Div (M), and 2 ACR received the Valorous Unit Award. In addition, six of the ten VII Corps manoeuvre brigade headquarters that saw substantial combat against the Republican Guard received the VUA in contravention of the spirit, if not the letter, of AR672-5-1's guidance that "[o]nly on rare occasions will a unit larger than a battalion qualify for award of the VUA."

During the Gulf War VII Corps destroyed nearly 1,350 Iraqi tanks, 1,224 armored troop carriers, 285 artillery pieces, 105 air defense systems, 1,229 trucks, and lost nearly 36 armored vehicles. They suffered a total of 47 dead and 192 wounded.

=== VII Corps ===
LTG Frederick M. Franks, Jr.

1st Armored Division
MG Ronald H. Griffith

3rd Brigade, 3rd Infantry Division (Mech) – Acting 1st Brigade

4th BN, 66th Armor Regiment
1st BN, 7th Infantry Regiment (Mech)
4th BN, 7th Infantry Regiment (Mech)
2nd BN, 41st Field Artillery Regiment (M109 155mm howitzer)

2nd Brigade

1st BN, 35th Armor Regiment
2nd BN, 70th Armor Regiment
4th BN, 70th Armor Regiment
6th BN, 6th Infantry Regiment (Mech)
2nd BN, 1st Field Artillery Regiment (M109 155mm howitzer)

3rd Brigade

3rd BN, 35th Armor Regiment
1st BN, 37th Armor Regiment
7th BN, 6th Infantry Regiment (Mech)
3rd BN, 1st Field Artillery Regiment (M109 155mm howitzer)

3rd Armored Division
MG Paul E. Funk

1st Brigade

4th BN, 32nd Armor Regiment
4th BN, 34th Armor Regiment
3rd BN, 5th Cavalry Regiment (Mech)
5th BN, 5th Cavalry Regiment (Mech)
3rd BN, 1st Field Artillery Regiment (M109 155mm howitzer)

2nd Brigade

4th BN, 18th Infantry Regiment (Mech)
3rd BN, 8th Cavalry Regiment (Armor)
4th BN, 8th Cavalry Regiment (Armor)
4th BN, 82nd Field Artillery Regiment (M109 155mm howitzer)

3rd Brigade

5th BN, 18th Infantry Regiment (Mech)
2nd BN, 67th Armor Regiment
4th BN, 67th Armor Regiment
2nd BN, 82nd Field Artillery Regiment (M109 155mm howitzer)

1st Infantry Division (Mech)
MG Thomas Rhame

1st Brigade

5th BN, 16th Infantry Regiment (Mech)
1st BN, 34th Armor Regiment
2nd BN, 34th Armor Regiment
1st Bn, 5th Field Artillery Regiment (M109 155mm howitzer)

2nd Brigade

2nd BN, 16th Infantry Regiment (Mech)
3rd BN, 37th Armor Regiment
4th BN, 37th Armor Regiment
4th Bn, 5th Field Artillery Regiment (M109 155mm howitzer)

3rd Brigade, 2nd Armored Division – Acting 3rd Brigade

1st BN, 41st Infantry Regiment (Mech)
2nd BN, 66th Armor Regiment
3rd BN, 66th Armor Regiment
4th Bn, 3rd Field Artillery Regiment (M109 155mm howitzer)

1st (UK) Armoured Division
Maj Gen Rupert Smith

4th Armoured Brigade
Brig. Christopher Hammerbeck

14th/20th King's Hussars & squadron of Life Guards (Challenger 1)
1st Bn, Royal Scots (Warrior)
3rd Bn, Royal Regiment of Fusiliers (Warrior)
2nd Field Regiment RA (155SP)
23 Engineer Regiment (AVRE)

7th Armoured Brigade
Brig. Patrick Cordingley

Royal Scots Dragoon Guards & troops of 17th/21st Lancers (Challenger)
Queen's Royal Irish Hussars (Challenger)
1st Bn, Staffordshire Regiment (Warrior)
40th Field Regiment RA (155SP)
21 Engineer Regiment (AVRE)

Divisional Armoured Reconnaissance unit

16th/5th The Queen's Royal Lancers & squadron Queen's Dragoon Guards (Scimitar/Spartan/Striker)

Divisional Artillery Group

32nd Heavy Regiment RA (203SP)
39th Heavy Regiment RA (MLRS)
26th Field Regiment RA (155SP)
12th Air Defence Regiment RA (Rapier)

1st Cavalry Division(-) Minus 3rd Brigade
MG John H. Tilelli, Jr.

1st Brigade

3rd BN, 32nd Armor Regiment
2nd BN, 8th Cavalry Regiment (Armor)
2nd BN, 5th Cavalry Regiment (Mech)
1st BN, 82nd Field Artillery Regiment (M109 155mm howitzer)

2nd Brigade

1st BN, 32nd Armor Regiment
1st BN, 5th Cavalry Regiment (Mech)
1st BN, 8th Cavalry Regiment (Armor)
3rd BN, 82nd Field Artillery Regiment (M109 155mm howitzer)

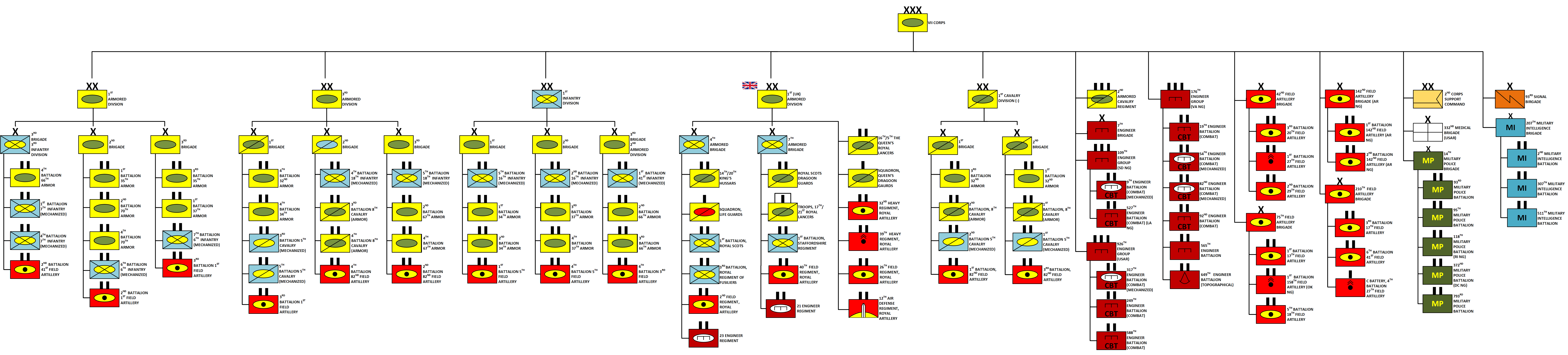
Order of battle graphic showing VII U.S Army Corps during Operation Desert Storm

=== Corps assets ===
2nd Armored Cavalry Regiment

11th Aviation Brigade

2nd Squadron 6th Cavalry
4th Battalion 229th Attack Helicopter Regiment
6th Squadron 6th Cavalry

7th Engineer Brigade

109th Engineer Group SD ARNG – Supported VII Corps

9th Engineer Battalion (CBT) (MECH)
527th Engineer Battalion (CBT HVY) LA ARNG

176th Engineer Group VA ARNG – Supported 1st Inf Div

19th Engineer Battalion (Corps CBT)
54th Engineer Battalion (CBT) (MECH)
82nd Engineer Battalion (CBT) (MECH)
92nd Engineer Battalion (CBT HVY)
565th Engineer Battalion
649th Engineer Battalion (TOPO)

926th Engineer Group USAR – Supported 1st Arm Div

249th Engineer Battalion (CBT HVY)
317th Engineer Battalion (CBT) (MECH)
588th Engineer Battalion (CORPS CBT)

42nd Field Artillery Brigade – Supported 1st Inf Div, 3rd Armd Div

3rd BN, 20th Field Artillery Regiment (155SP)
1st BN, 27th Field Artillery Regiment (MLRS)
2nd BN, 29th Field Artillery Regiment (155SP)

75th Field Artillery Brigade – Supported 1st Inf Div, 1st Armd Div

1st BN, 17th Field Artillery Regiment (155SP)
5th BN, 18th Field Artillery Regiment (203SP)
1st BN, 158th Field Artillery Regiment (MLRS) OK ARNG

142nd Field Artillery Brigade AR ARNG – Supported 1st Inf Div, 1st UK Armd Div

1st BN, 142nd Field Artillery Regiment (203SP) AR ARNG
2nd BN, 142nd Field Artillery Regiment (203SP) AR ARNG

210th Field Artillery Brigade – Supported 2nd ACR, 1st Inf Div

3rd BN, 17th Field Artillery Regiment (155SP)
6th BN, 41st Field Artillery Regiment (155SP)
C Btry, 4th Battalion, 27th Field Artillery (MLRS)

2nd Corps Support Command

7th Corps Support Group

6th Transportation Battalion
71st Maintenance Battalion
87th Maintenance Battalion
213th Support Battalion

16th Corps Support Group

4th Transportation Battalion
101st Ordnance Battalion
13th Support Battalion
300th Service & Support Battalion

30th Corps Support Group NC ARNG

136th Quartermaster Battalion
690th Maintenance Battalion

43rd Corps Support Group

68th Transportation Battalion
169th Maintenance Battalion
544th Maintenance Battalion
553rd Service & Support Battalion

159th Corps Support Group USAR

286th Supply & Service Battalion ME ARNG

332nd Medical Brigade USAR

127th Medical Group AL ARNG

31st Combat Support Hospital
128th Combat Support Hospital
377th Combat Support Hospital USAR
403rd Combat Support Hospital USAR

341st Medical Group USAR

159th Mobile Army Surgical Hospital LA ARNG
475th Mobile Army Surgical Hospital KY ARNG
807th Mobile Army Surgical Hospital USAR
912th Mobile Army Surgical Hospital USAR
345th Combat Support Hospital USAR – Converted to a MASH in January

Task Forces Evac (Provisional)

12th Evacuation Hospital
13th Evacuation Hospital WI ARNG
148th Evacuation Hospital AR ARNG
312th Evacuation Hospital USAR
410th Evacuation Hospital USAR

14th Military Police Brigade

93rd Military Police Battalion
95th Military Police Battalion
118th Military Police Battalion RI ARNG
372nd Military Police Battalion DC ARNG
793rd Military Police Battalion

93rd Signal Brigade

207th Military Intelligence Brigade

2nd Military Intelligence Battalion
307th Military Intelligence Battalion
511th Military Intelligence Battalion

== Redeployment and inactivation ==
After the fighting was over, most VII Corps units were redeployed directly to the United States for reassignment or inactivation. VII Corps HQ returned to Germany and was disbanded as part of the post-Cold War American defense spending cuts. Some VII Corps units remained in Germany and were reassigned to V Corps or USAREUR. A farewell ceremony was held in downtown Stuttgart at Schlossplatz, where the VII Corps colors were retired on 18 March 1992. The official inactivation was held at Fort McPherson, Ga., in April 1992.

=== Commanders during the Cold War and Gulf War ===
- Maj. Gen. Withers A. Burress - June 1951 - December 1952
- Maj. Gen. James M. Gavin - December 1952 - March 1954
- Lt. Gen. Henry I. Hodes - March 1954 - February 1955
- Lt. Gen. George H. Decker - February 1955 - May 1956
- Maj. Gen. Halley G. Maddox - June - July 1956
- Lt. Gen. John F. Uncles - August 1956 - August 1958
- Lt. Gen. Gordon B. Rogers - September 1958 - October 1959
- Lt. Gen. Guy S. Meloy Jr. - October 1959 - January 1961
- Lt. Gen. John C. Oakes - January 1961 - April 1962
- Lt. Gen. C. H. Bonesteel III - April 1962 - August 1963
- Lt. Gen. Louis W. Truman - September 1963 - July 1965
- Lt. Gen. Frank T. Mildren - July 1965 - May 1968
- Lt. Gen. Donald V. Bennett - June 1968 - September 1969
- Lt. Gen. George G. O'Connor - October 1969 - February 1971
- Lt. Gen. Fillmore K. Mearns - February 1971- March 1973
- Lt. Gen. George S. Blanchard - March 1973 - June 1975
- Lt. Gen. Frederick J. Kroesen - July 1975 - October 1976
- Lt. Gen. David E. Ott - October 1976 - October 1978
- Lt. Gen. Julius W. Becton Jr. - October 1978 - June 1981
- Lt. Gen. William J. Livsey - June 1981 - July 1983
- Lt. Gen. John R. Galvin - July 1983 - February 1985
- Lt. Gen. Andrew P. Chambers - February 1985 - July 1987
- Lt. Gen. Ronald L. Watts - July 1987 - August 1989
- Lt. Gen. Frederick M. Franks Jr. - August 1989 - June 1991
- Lt. Gen. Michael Spiglemire - August 1991 - 1992 (Inactivation)
