= John Francis Uncles =

United States Army general (1898–1967)

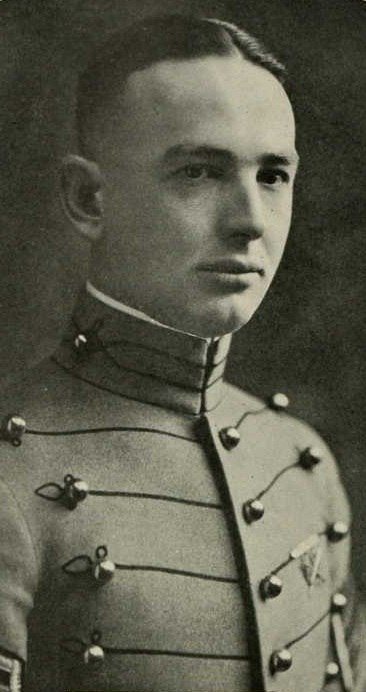
- Uncles as a West Point Cadet, 1922
- Born: 18 September 1898; Chillicothe, Missouri, US
- Died: 20 January 1967 (aged 68); Washington, D.C., US
- Burial place: Arlington National Cemetery
- Military career
- Allegiance: United States
- Branch: United States Army
- Service years: 1917–1958
- Rank: Lieutenant General
- Commands: 404th Field Artillery Group; 34th Field Artillery Brigade; 32nd Field Artillery Brigade; 4th Infantry Division Artillery; Seventh United States Army Artillery; VII Corps
- Conflicts: World War I; World War II
- Awards: Distinguished Service Medal; Legion of Merit; Bronze Star

John Francis Uncles (18 September 1898 – 20 January 1967) was a lieutenant general in the United States Army. He attained prominence as commander of the United States VII Corps.

== Early life ==
Uncles was born on September 18, 1898, in Chillicothe, Missouri. His family moved to Kansas City when he was six, and he was educated at St. Vincent's parochial school and De La Salle Academy, graduating with special honors in 1916 and receiving the Bishop's medal for finishing with first honors in the literary-scientific course. After graduation, he joined the Missouri National Guard, enlisting a few days following the declaration of war for World War I. Uncles was assigned to the unit which was federalized as Battery D, 129th Field Artillery, and he served in France under battery commander Harry S. Truman.

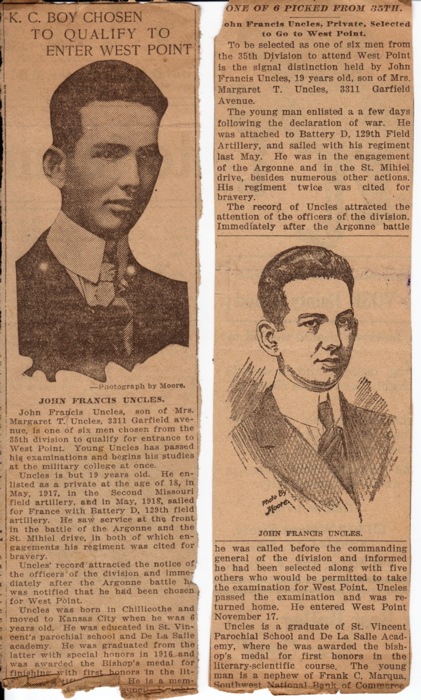
John Francis Uncles newspaper clippings

John Francis Uncles portrait

== Early military career ==
Chosen by Truman when unit commanders were asked after the armistice to help replenish the Army's supply of junior officers by nominating candidates from the enlisted ranks, in 1918 Uncles began attendance at the United States Military Academy. He graduated in 1922 with a commission as a second lieutenant of Artillery.

Uncles served in Artillery assignments of increasing responsibility and rank throughout the United States and overseas.

In 1927, he graduated from the Field Artillery Officer Course. From 1930 to 1934 Uncles was an instructor at the United States Military Academy.

Uncles served with the 11th Field Artillery Regiment in Hawaii from 1934 to 1937.

In 1938, Uncles graduated from the Command & General Staff College, afterwards being assigned as instructor in the Department of Tactics & Communications at the Fort Sill, Oklahoma Field Artillery School, where he served until 1940.

Uncles served as assistant personnel officer, G-1, in the office of the Chief of Field Artillery from 1940 to 1942.

== World War II ==
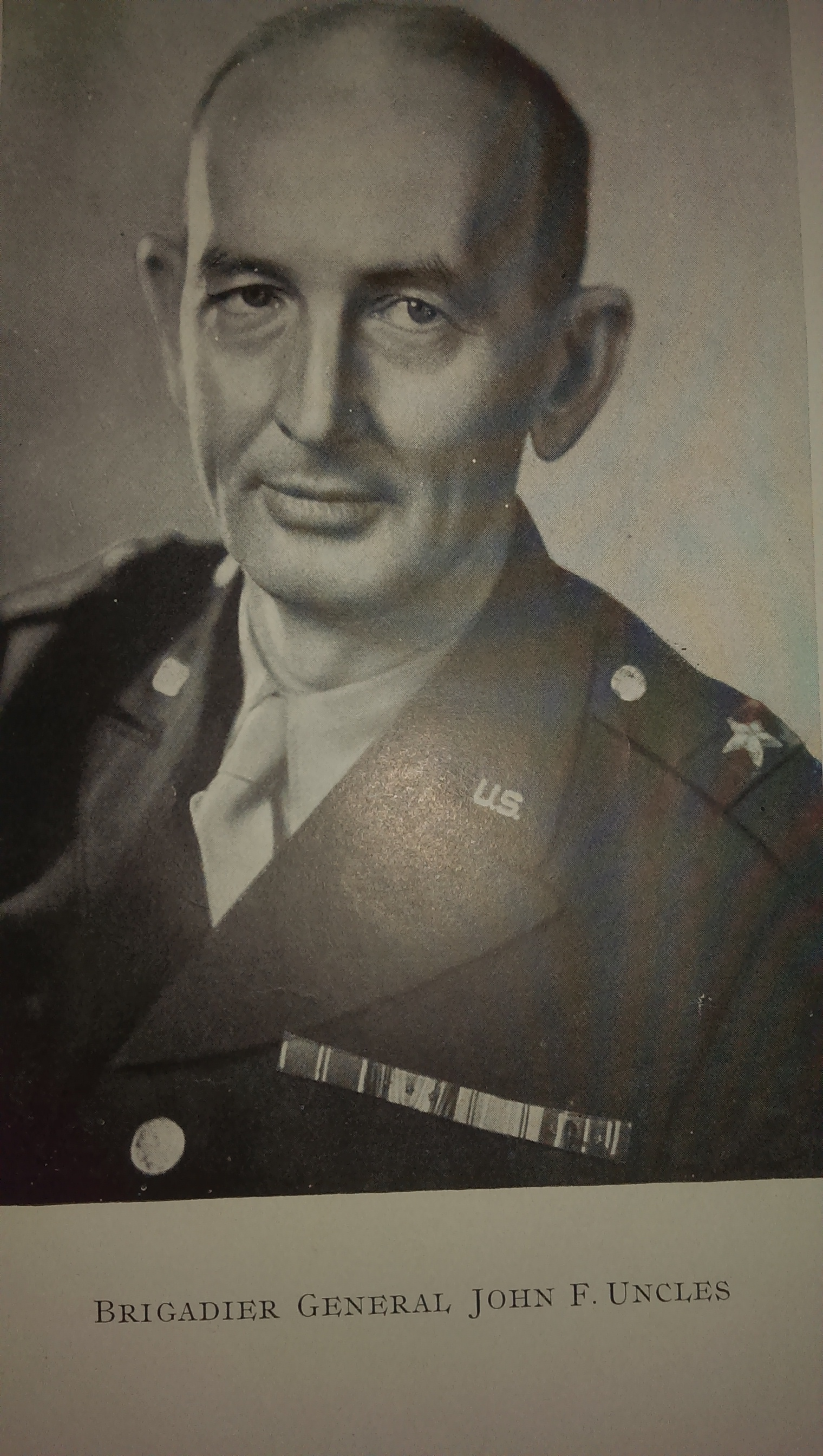
Uncles as a brigadier general during World War II.

In 1942, Uncles was assigned as assistant personnel officer, G-1, at Headquarters, Army Ground Forces, where he remained until 1943.

Uncles was assigned to the staff of the Field Artillery School at Fort Sill in 1943, and later that year, he attended the New Division Officers Course, also at Fort Sill.

At the end of 1943, Uncles was assigned as commander of the 404th Field Artillery Group, serving until 1944, when he assumed command of the 34th Field Artillery Brigade, which he led in combat throughout France, Belgium and the Netherlands until the end of World War II.

== Post World War II ==
In 1945 Uncles was appointed to command the 32nd Field Artillery Brigade in Germany, serving until 1946.

He served as Chief of Field Artillery in the Army’s Career Management Branch from 1946 to 1948.

In 1948, Uncles became Chief of Staff of United States Constabulary in Europe, serving until 1950, when he was named commander of the 4th Infantry Division Artillery, which he led until 1951.

Uncles was commander of Seventh Army Artillery from 1951 to 1952, after which he was assigned to the staff of the Army’s Deputy Chief of Staff for Logistics, G-4, as deputy assistant chief of staff for research and development, where he served until 1953.

From 1953 to 1954 Uncles was the Army’s Chief of Research & Development.

Uncles was appointed Chief of Staff for United States Army, Europe in 1954, and served in this assignment until 1956.

In 1956 Uncles was assigned as commander of the VII Corps, serving until his 1958 retirement.

== Awards and decorations ==
Uncles’ awards included two Distinguished Service Medals, the Legion of Merit, and the Bronze Star.

== Retirement and death ==
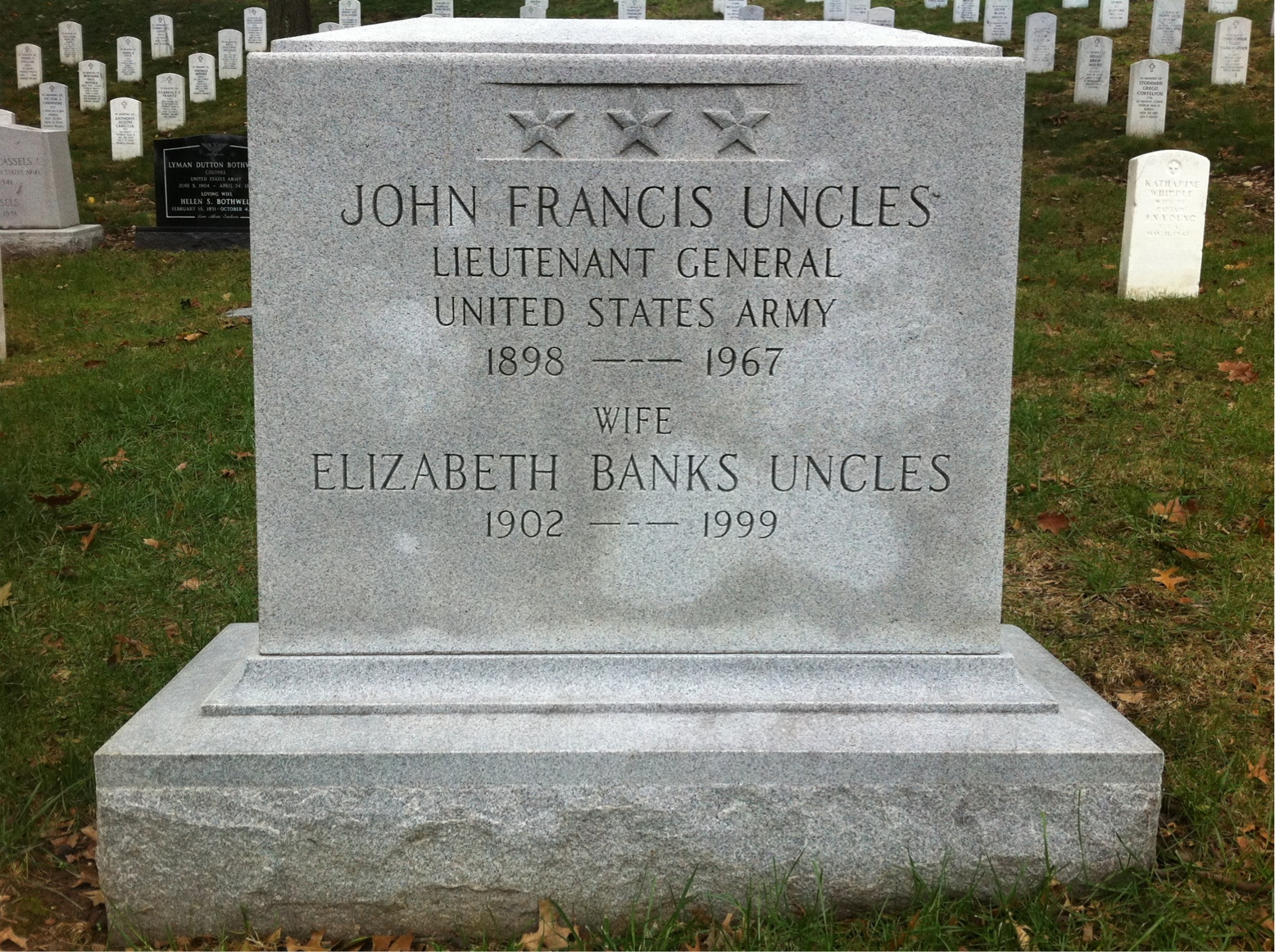
Grave at Arlington National Cemetery

General Uncles retired in 1958, afterwards residing in Washington, D.C. He died at Walter Reed Army Hospital in Washington, D.C., on 20 January 1967. Uncles is buried at Arlington National Cemetery with his.

== Personal ==
In 1926 Uncles was married to Elizabeth Bowman Banks (1902–1999). Their daughter Margaret U. "Marka" Huffman (1930–2009), was married to Army Major General Burnside E. Huffman (1920–2005).
