= Ronald L. Watts =

United States Army general

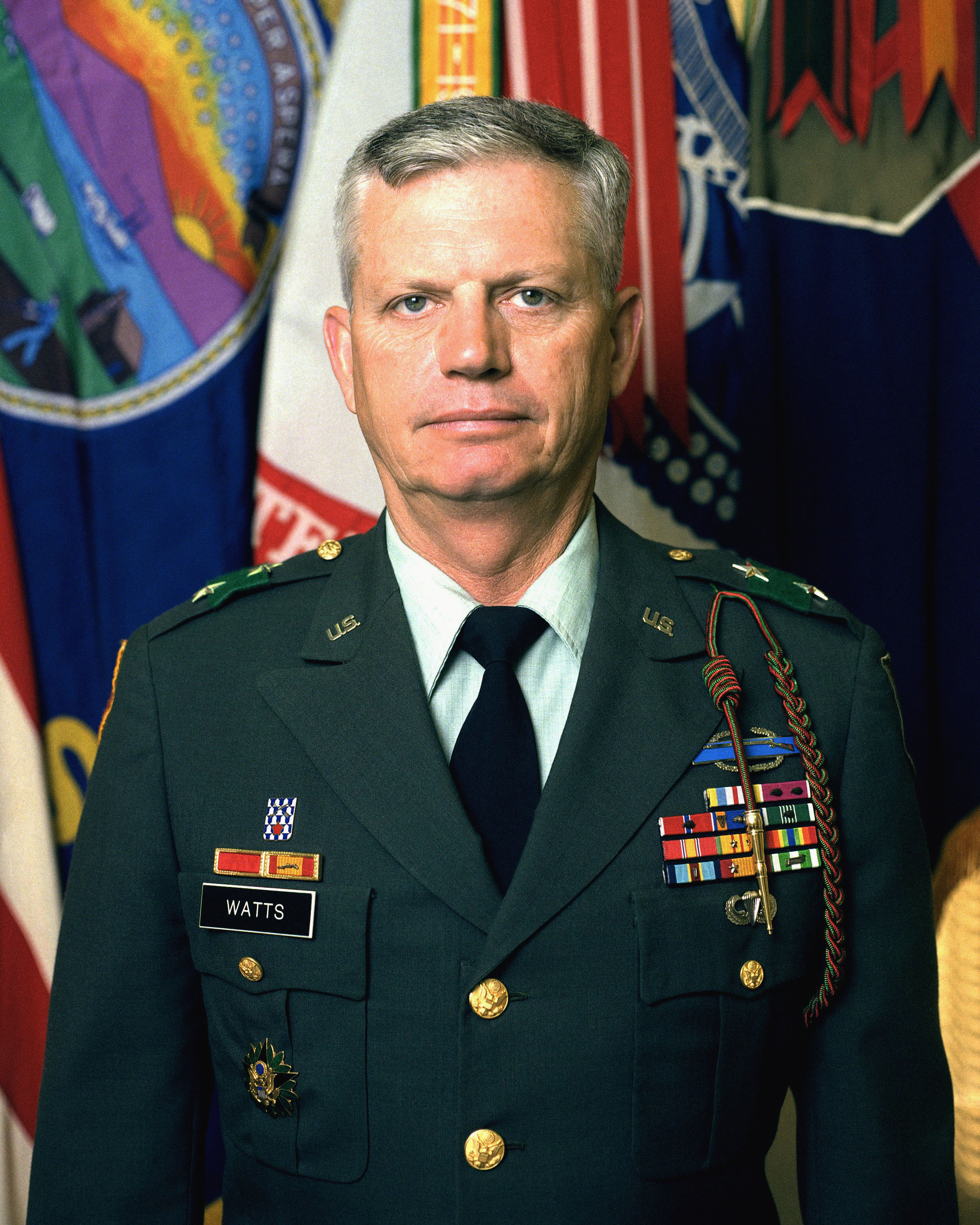
- Pictured as a major general in 1984
- Born: 27 June 1934 (age 92); Seneca, Missouri, U.S.
- Military career
- Allegiance: United States
- Branch: United States Army
- Service years: 1956–1989
- Rank: Lieutenant general
- Commands: 1st Infantry Division; VII Corps; Deputy Commanding General, First United States Army

Ronald L. Watts (born 27 June 1934) is a retired lieutenant general in the United States Army. His assignments included Commanding General of 1st Infantry Division, 2nd Armored Division, VII Corps and Deputy Commanding General of First United States Army.
