= Gamaksan (Gyeonggi) =

Mountain in South Korea

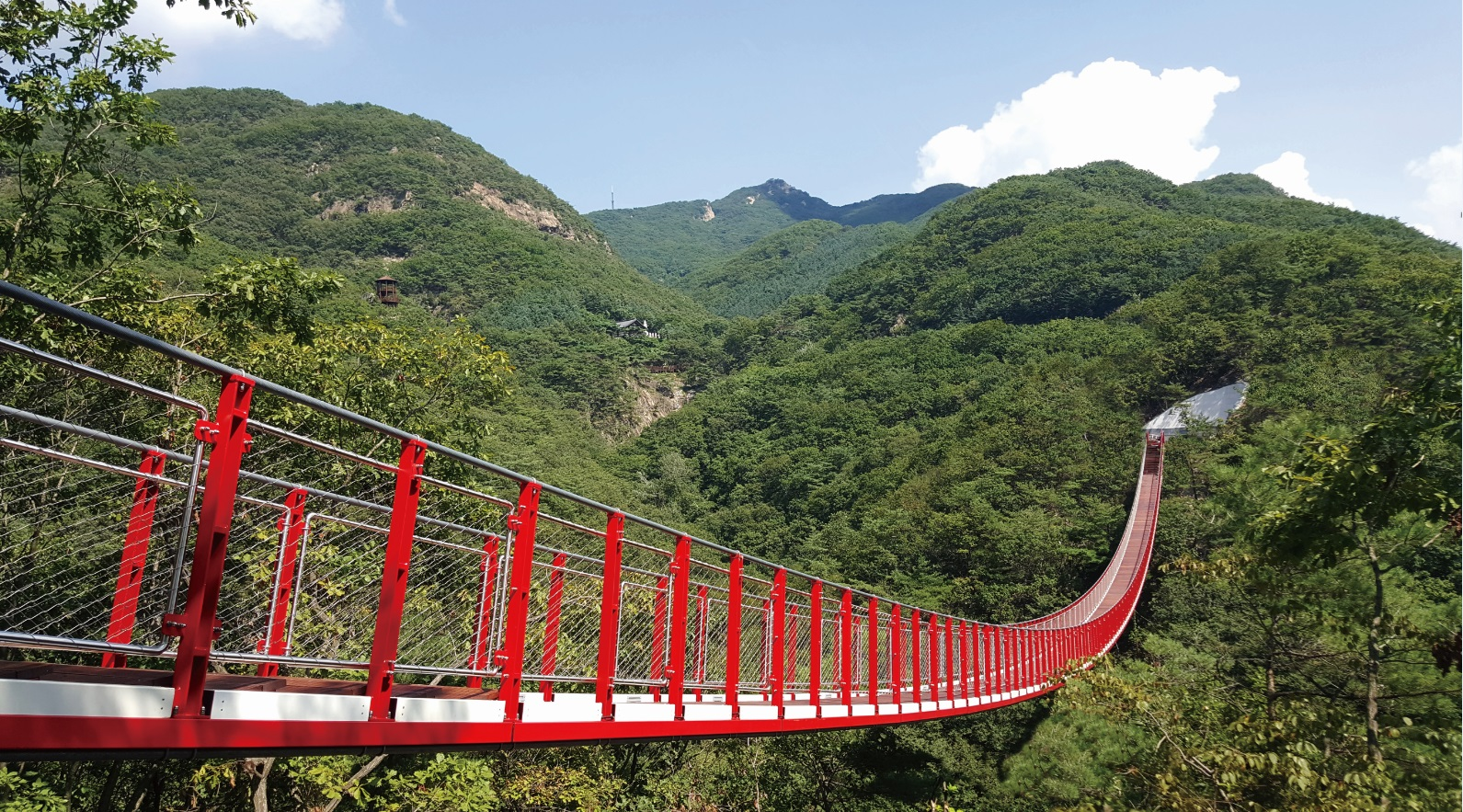
- Gamaksan Bridge

Highest point
- Elevation: 675 m (2,215 ft)
- Coordinates: 37.941667°N 126.9688889°E

Geography
- Location: South Korea

Korean name
- Hangul: 감악산
- Hanja: 紺岳山
- RR: Gamaksan
- MR: Kamaksan

Gamaksan (Korean: 감악산), also known as Kamak Mountain or Hill 675 (675고지) during the Korean War, is a mountain in Gyeonggi Province, South Korea. It sits between the cities of Paju, Yangju, and Yeoncheon County. Gamaksan has an elevation of 675 m (2,215 ft).

It has been considered a sacred mountain in Korean shamanism since the Silla period. In the middle of the mountain, there was a temple, which is now demolished. Since the Three Kingdoms period, the mountain has been the site of several battles, including during the Khitan invasion, and it was also the main theatre of the Battle of Gorangpo, during the Korean War. Gamaksan is close to the Korean Demilitarized Zone, and thus, there are military bases in its vicinity.

== See also ==
- List of mountains in Korea
