= Kang Jung-ai =

South Korean academic (born 1957)

Kamg Jung-ai
- 강정애
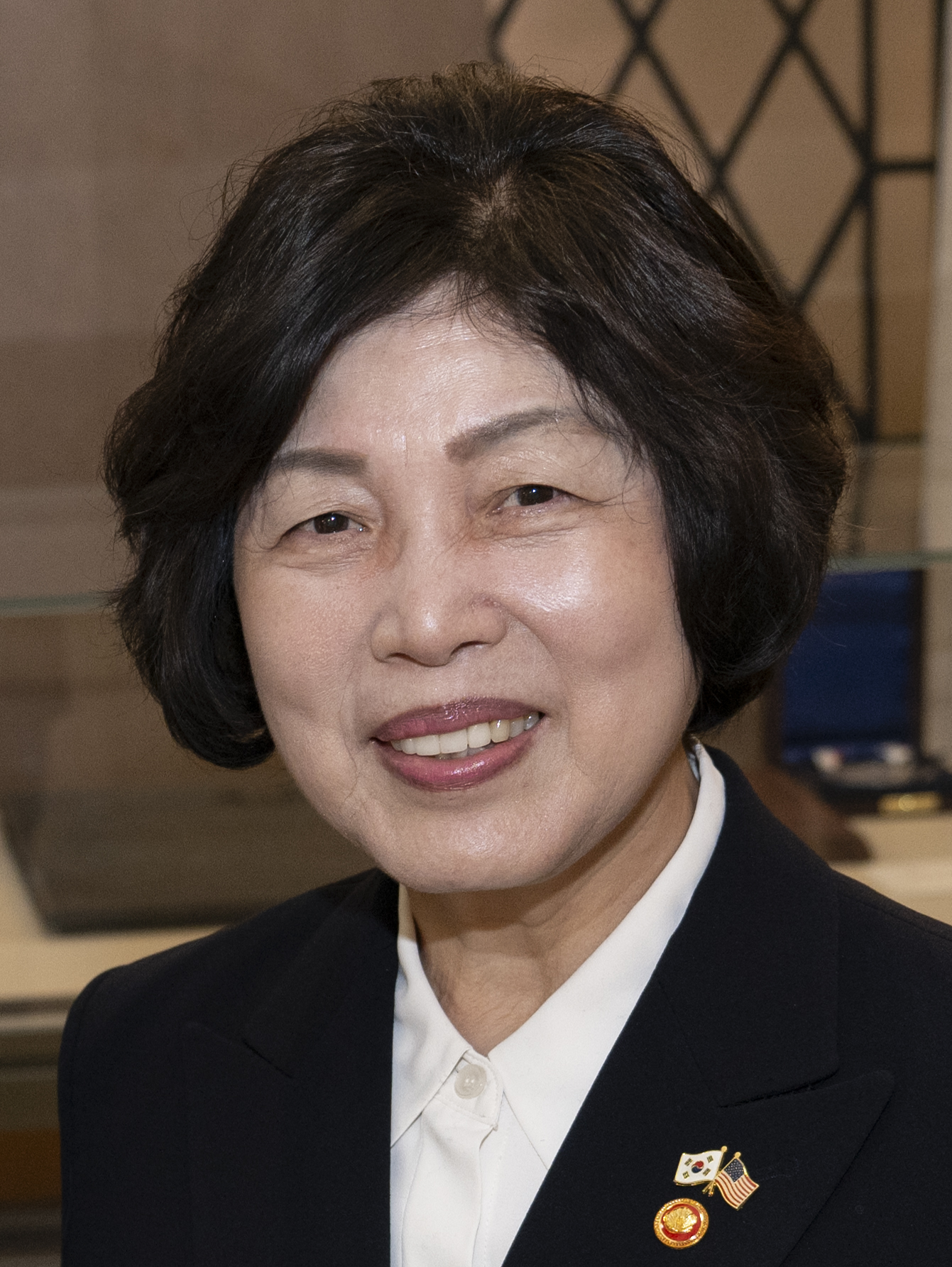
- Kang in 2025

Minister of Patriots and Veterans Affairs
- In office 26 December 2023 – 25 July 2025
- Prime Minister: Han Duck-soo; Choi Sang-mok (acting); Lee Ju-ho (acting); Kim Min-seok
- Preceded by: Park Min-shik
- Succeeded by: Kwon Oh-eul

Personal details
- Born: 5 May 1957 (age 69) Seocho, Seoul, South Korea
- Party: Independent
- Education: Sookmyung Women's University (BA, MA); Paris 1 Panthéon-Sorbonne University (PhD)

Kang Jung-ae (Korean: 강정애, born 5 May 1957) is a South Korean professor and politician who served as the minister of patriots and veterans affairs from 2023 to 2025. She majored in business administration at Sookmyung Women's University and received a Ph.D. in human resources economics from Paris 1 Pantheon-Sorbon University.

She became a professor at her alma mater in 1988 and served as its president from 2016 to 2020. Kang served as a member of the Presidential Committee on Regulatory Reform and the National Economic Advisory Council during the conservative Lee Myung Bak government. In December 2023, President Yoon nominated Kan to be the Minister of Patriots and Veterans Affairs whicg was officially confirmed by the National Assembly on 26 December, thus becoming the second woman to hold that position.

On 4 April 2025, following President Yoon Suk Yeol's impeachment, Kang retained her role under acting presidents Han Duck-soo and Lee Ju-ho and even after Lee Jae Myung's inauguration on 4 June following the presidential election held the previous day, Kang stayed on her role due to Lee turning down most of the Yoon cabinet ministers resignations until Lee's cabinet is officially sworn in.

== See also ==
Cabinet of Yoon Suk Yeol

Political offices
Preceded by Park Min-shik	Ministry of Patriots and Veterans Affairs; 2023–2025	Succeeded by Kwon Oh-eul
