= I Corps (United States) =

Corps of the United States Army

- Shoulder sleeve insignia
- Active: 15 January 1918–25 March 1919; 27 June 1944–28 March 1950; 2 August 1950–present
- Country: United States of America
- Branch: United States Army
- Type: Corps
- Role: Administrative oversight in Asia-Pacific region
- Part of: United States Army Pacific
- Garrison/HQ: Joint Base Lewis-McChord (Forward at Camp Zama, Japan)
- Nickname: "America's Corps"
- Motto: Courage
- Engagements: World War I; Champagne-Marne; Aisne-Marne; St. Mihiel; Meuse-Argonne; Île-de-France 1918; Champagne 1918; Lorraine 1918; World War II; Papua New Guinea; Luzon; Korean War; UN Defensive; UN Offensive; CCF Intervention; First UN Counteroffensive; CCF Spring Offensive; UN Summer-Fall Offensive; Second Korean Winter; Korea, Summer-Fall 1952; Third Korean Winter; Korea, Summer 1953; Iraq War
- Decorations: Presidential Unit Citation (Army); Philippine Presidential Unit Citation; Republic of Korea Presidential Unit Citation; Meritorious Unit Commendation with Bronze Oak Leaf; Army Superior Unit Award
- Website: Official Website

Commanders
- Commanding General: LTG Matthew McFarlane
- Command Sergeant Major: CSM Jonathan Reffeor
- Senior warrant officer: CWO5 Barry L. Sledd Jr
- Deputy Commanding General: BG Joseph Escandon
- Deputy Commanding General, Operations: BG Robbin Dove
- Deputy Commanding General, Sustainment: COL Erin C. Miller
- Notable commanders: List of commanders

Insignia
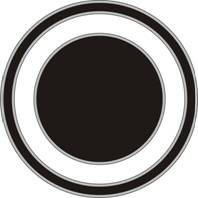
- Combat service identification badge

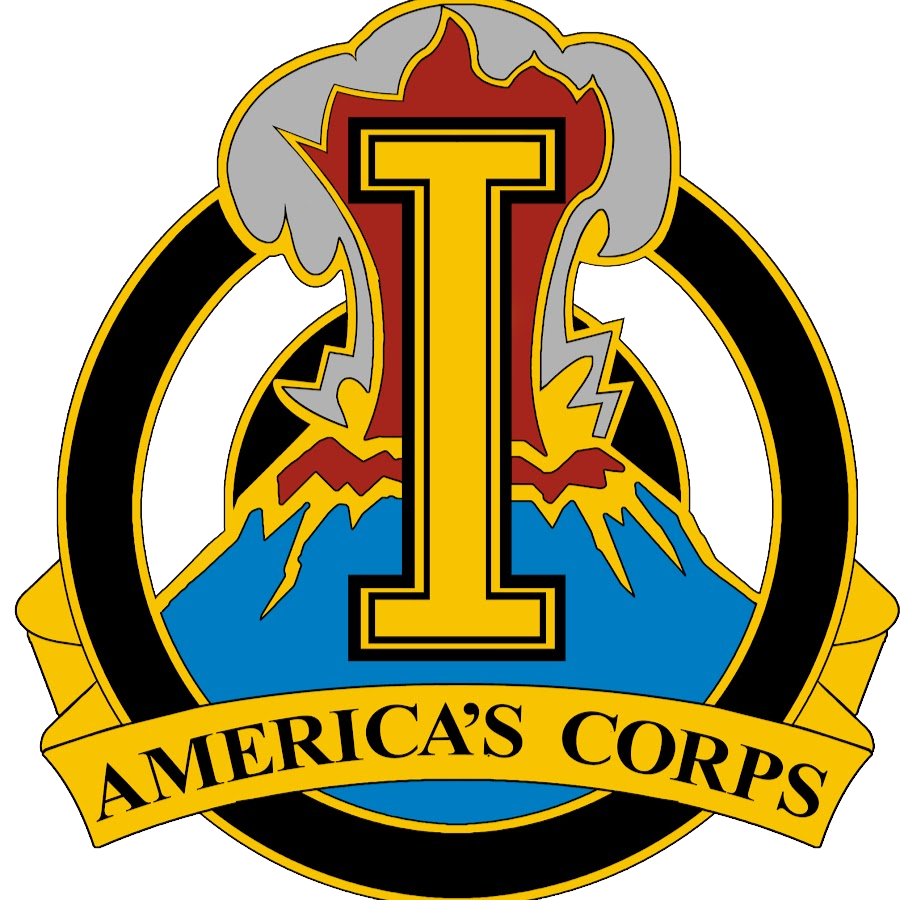
- Distinctive unit insignia

- Flag

The I Corps is a corps of the United States Army headquartered in Joint Base Lewis-McChord, Washington. It is a major formation of United States Army Pacific (USARPAC) and its current mission involves administrative oversight of army units in the Asia-Pacific region, including the Pacific Pathways program.

Activated in World War I in France, the I Corps oversaw US Army divisions as they repelled several major German offensives and advanced into Germany. The corps was deactivated following the end of the war. Reactivated for service in World War II, the corps took command of divisions in the south Pacific, leading US and Australian Army forces as they pushed the Japanese Army out of New Guinea. It went on to be one of the principal leading elements in the Battle of Luzon, liberating the Philippines. It then took charge as one of the administrative headquarters in the occupation of Japan.

Deployed to Korea at the start of the Korean War, the corps was one of three corps that remained in the country for the entire US participation in the conflict, commanding US, British, and South Korean forces through three years of back-and-forth campaigns against North Korean and Chinese forces. Following the end of the war, it remained in Korea for almost 20 years guarding the Korean Demilitarized Zone. Active today, the corps acts as a subordinate headquarters of United States Army Pacific, and has also seen deployments in support of Operation Iraqi Freedom and Operation Enduring Freedom.

== History ==
=== World War I ===
Following the American declaration of war on Germany, on 6 April 1917, the I Corps was organized and activated on 15–20 January 1918, in the National Army in Neufchâteau, France, the first of several corps-sized formations intended to command divisions of the American Expeditionary Forces in Europe during World War I. Assisted by the French XXXII Corps, the headquarters was organized and trained; on 20 January, Major General Hunter Liggett took command.

In February, the corps consisted of the 1st, 2nd, 26th, 32nd, 41st, and 42nd Infantry Divisions. From February to July, 1918, the German Army launched four major offensives, attempting to secure victory before the full American forces could be mobilized. The final offensive, started in July 1918, was an attempt to cross the Marne, in the area of Château-Thierry, but the I Corps and other formations on the American lines held, and the attack was rebuffed.

With the defeat of these German drives, the I Corps conducted its first offensive mission, participating in the Second Battle of the Marne from 18 July until 6 August, which resulted in the reduction of the more important salients driven into Allied lines by the German offensives. After a brief period in the defensive sectors of Champagne and Lorraine between 7 August and 11 September, the corps took part in the St. Mihiel attack on 12 September, which reduced the German salient there during the next four days. Then followed another period on the defense in Lorraine as preparations advanced for what was to be the final Allied offensive of the war. On 26 September, I Corps troops began the attack northward that opened the Meuse-Argonne Offensive. From that day until 11 November 1918 when the war ended, the I Corps was constantly moving forward.

The I Corps shoulder sleeve insignia was first worn by members of I Corps after approval from the AEF on 3 December 1918, but it was not officially approved until 1922. The I Corps continued to train in France, until it was demobilized on 25 March 1919.

During its time in World War I, the I Corps commanded the 1st, 2nd, 3rd, 4th, 5th, 6th, 26th, 28th, 32nd, 35th, 36th, 41st, 43rd, 77th, 78th, 80th, 82nd, 90th, 91st, 92nd Infantry Divisions at one point or another. Also assigned to the corps were the French 62nd, 167th and 5th Cavalry Divisions.

=== Interwar period ===
==== I Corps (I) ====
The I Corps was constituted in the Organized Reserve on 29 July 1921, allotted to the First Corps Area and assigned to the First Army. The headquarters and headquarters company (HHC) were initiated by September 1922 at the Army Base, Boston, Massachusetts. HHC, I Corps was withdrawn from the Organized Reserve on 15 August 1927 and demobilized.

==== Army reorganization and I Corps (II) ====
As part of an Army reorganization beginning in August 1927 that grouped the new XX, XXI, and XXII Corps, organized in the Regular Army, under the new Seventh Army (also a Regular formation and a redesignation of the First Army) as a contingency force staffed by professional soldiers rather than reservists that could immediately take control of forces and respond to any emergency, the I Corps HHC were withdrawn from the Organized Reserve and demobilized on 15 August 1927. Concurrently, all Reserve personnel were relieved from assignment.

The second iteration of the I Corps was constituted in the Regular Army as HHC, XX Corps on 15 August 1927, allotted to the First Corps Area, and assigned to the Seventh Army. Redesignated HHC, I Corps on 13 October 1927 and concurrently assigned to the First Army. On 1 October 1933, the corps headquarters was partially activated at Boston with Regular Army personnel from Headquarters, First Corps Area and Reserve personnel from the corps area at large. As a "Regular Army Inactive" unit from 1933 to 1940, the corps headquarters was occasionally organized provisionally for short periods using its assigned Reserve officers and staff officers from Headquarters, First Corps Area. These periods included several First Corps Area and First Army CPXs in the 1930s and the First Army maneuvers in New York in 1935, 1939, and 1940. Headquarters, I Corps was fully activated 1 November 1940, less Reserve personnel, at 1429 Senate Street, Columbia, South Carolina, and assumed command and control of the 8th, 9th, and 30th Divisions. The HHC were transferred to Fort Jackson, South Carolina, on 20 February 1941, once space for the corps headquarters became available on the post. The I Corps participated in the Carolina Maneuvers in November 1941 as part of the First Army. After the maneuver, the I Corps returned to Fort Jackson, where it was located on 7 December 1941.

=== World War II ===
==== New Guinea Campaign ====
On 6 July 1942 Lieutenant General Robert L. Eichelberger took command of the corps which he would lead through the majority of its service in the war. In the summer of 1942 the corps was ordered to Australia, closing into the area at Rockhampton on 17 October 1942. This move was to be part of a larger overall offensive in the south Pacific region. The corps at this time comprised the 41st and 32nd Divisions, engaged in the defense of British New Guinea, the beginning of the New Guinea campaign. Though the Japanese advanced rapidly at first, a number of factors slowed their progress against the Allied forces. Stubborn resistance from two Australian brigades bought time for I Corps reinforcements to arrive while the terrain proved more difficult than the Japanese had anticipated. Supplies, which were already insufficient for the Japanese forces, were shortened even more as Japan's high command diverted them to the Guadalcanal campaign. The Japanese attack stalled, and once the threat of a Japanese invasion of Australia was abated, the I Corps launched an offensive to push back the Japanese. With the 32nd Division and the 163rd Infantry Regiment of the 41st Division, the offensive was launched across the Owen Stanley Mountains of New Guinea. This force, later augmented by the Australian 7th Division, fought the Battle of Buna-Gona, slowly advancing north against a tenacious enemy under harsh weather and terrain conditions. Overstretched Japanese forces, low on supplies, were eventually overcome by US and Australian forces. Despite being surrounded, trapped, and outnumbered, the Japanese forces continued to fight until they were completely wiped out by Allied forces. Buna, on the north coast of the island, fell on 22 January 1943. The campaign was the first major Allied victory against the Japanese Army, and the I Corps received the Distinguished Unit Citation. This victory marked the turn of the tide in the ground war against Japan.

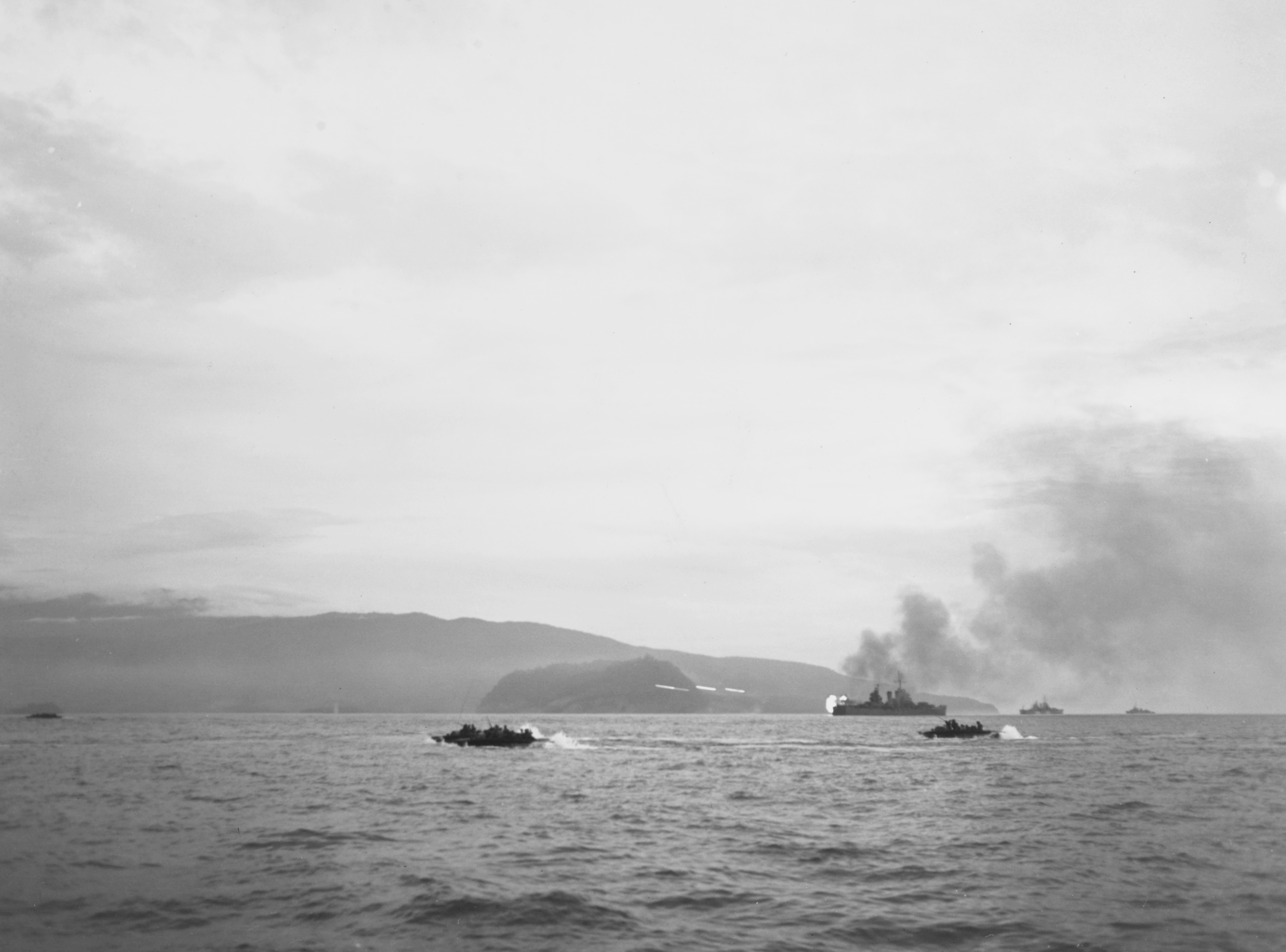
LVTs head for the invasion beaches at Humboldt Bay, Netherlands New Guinea, during the Hollandia landing in the campaign

After this campaign the I Corps returned to Rockhampton, where it was engaged in the training of the Allied forces beginning to arrive in that area for the coming campaigns. From February 1943 until March 1944 the I Corps prepared for its next assignment, Operation Cartwheel. That mission was the capture of Hollandia on the north coast of Dutch New Guinea; the units allocated to the corps for this task were the 24th and 41st Infantry Divisions. The Task Force established itself ashore after a successful amphibious assault on 19 April 1944. It then began an offensive in that area to remove Japanese forces, before establishing air bases there. The battle was a vicious one; the jungles and swamps made difficult fighting ground, and it was not until 6 June that the area was secured. The entire Japanese 18th Army was cut off from its bases by the force. Following this campaign the corps directed the seizure of the island of Biak, which was secured by 24 June, to complete the advances necessary for the subsequent invasion of the Philippine Islands. On 20 August Major General Innis P. Swift succeeded General Eichelberger as commander of the corps.

On 27 July 1944, the headquarters of the World War I-era I Corps was concurrently reconstituted in the Regular Army and consolidated with the headquarters of the currently-active I Corps, preserving its Great War lineage and honors.

==== Luzon ====
The corps was assigned to the Sixth United States Army in preparation for the offensive in the Philippines from the assets of the Philippine Commonwealth Army, Philippine Constabulary and the recognized guerrilla units. On 9 January 1945, the I Corps successfully landed on the coast of Lingayen Gulf in northern Luzon with the mission of establishing a base for future operations to the north and of denying the enemy northern access to the South China Sea. As a part of the Sixth Army with an overall force of 175,000 men, the American forces faced over 260,000 Japanese in Luzon. In a sustained drive of thirty-four days which covered over 100 miles, the I Corps crossed central Luzon and thus separated the Japanese forces in the north from those in southern Luzon, destroying Japanese armored units along the way. Additional landings at Samar and Palawan were conducted in February, reducing the pressure on the forces of the I Corps. Following this accomplishment, the corps turned northward and began the systematic reduction of the enemy positions on the approach to the Cagayan Valley. The breakthrough into the valley was followed by a swift exploitation that took the corps to the north coast. This advance covered two hundred miles in little over 100 days; eliminating effective enemy resistance in northern Luzon. Manila was recaptured by the Allies after heavy fighting that ravaged the city. The intense fighting that ensued cost 8,000 killed and 30,000 wounded in the Sixth Army, compared to 190,000 dead for Japan. As the Sixth Army finished off the Japanese on Luzon, the Eighth United States Army in the south sent units all throughout the Philippines to eliminate remaining Japanese resistance on the islands. The Tenth United States Army in the north commenced securing Okinawa and Iwo Jima. With the defeat of the Japanese at each of these places, the US forces had locations from which to launch attacks into mainland Japan.

Allied forces then began preparing for the invasion of mainland Japan, Operation Downfall. The I Corps was assigned as one of four Corps under the command of the Sixth Army, with a strength of 14 divisions. The I Corps was to lead the assault on Miyazaki, in southern Kyūshū, with the 25th, 33rd, and 41st Infantry Divisions. Opposing them would be the Japanese 57th Army, with the 154th, 156th, and 212th Japanese Infantry Divisions. But the assault was not required. Japan surrendered following the use of nuclear weapons on Hiroshima and Nagasaki.

During World War II, the 6th, 8th, 9th, 24th, 25th, 30th (during training in U.S. only?), 32nd, 33rd, 37th, 41st, 43rd, 77th and 98th Infantry Divisions were assigned to the I Corps at one time or another, along with the 2nd Marine Division, 7th Australian Division, and elements of the 11th Airborne Division.

==== Occupation of Japan ====
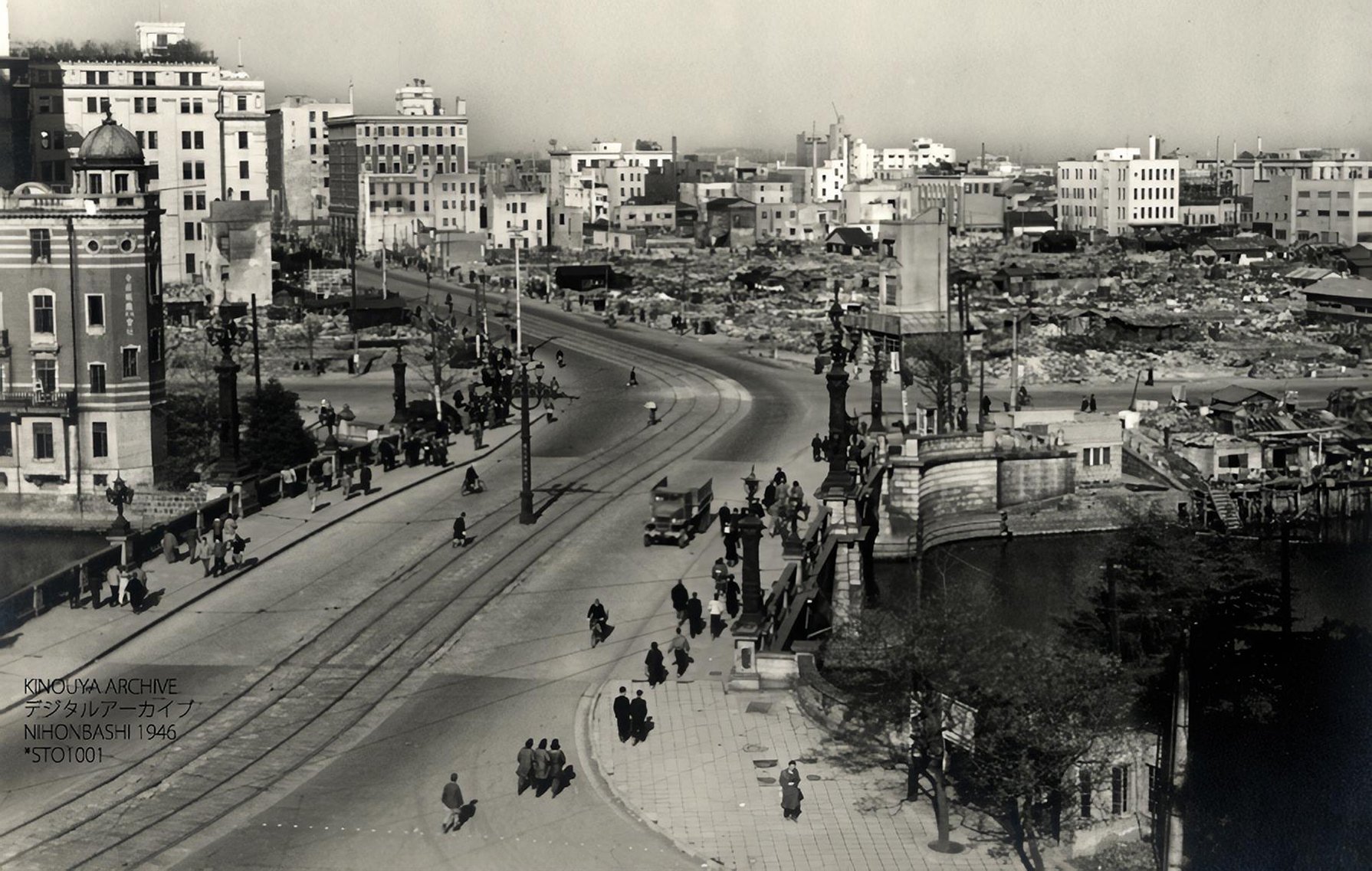
Tokyo during occupation, 1946.

After the end of hostilities, the I Corps was assigned to occupation duty in Japan. On 19 September 1945 the corps, with the assigned 33rd Infantry Division, sailed from Lingayen Gulf for Japan, landing on the island of Honshū on 25 September, three weeks after Japan's formal surrender. The next few years were a period during which the terms of the surrender were supervised and enforced; Japanese military installations and material were seized, troops were disarmed and discharged, and weapons of warfare disposed of. The duties of the occupation force included conversion of industry, repatriation of foreign nationals, and supervision of the complex features of all phases of Japanese government, economics, education, and industry.

By 1948, as the purely occupational mission was accomplished, troops of the corps focused more military training and field exercises designed to prepare them for combat. Its force was eventually downsized to the 24th Infantry Division on Kyūshū and 25th Infantry Division on mid-Honshū. The US Army continued a slow and steady process of post-war drawdown and demobilization on its own, and on 28 March 1950, the corps was formally inactivated in Japan, and its command consolidated with other units.

=== Korean War ===
Only a few months later, the Korean War began, and units from Japan began streaming into South Korea. The Eighth United States Army, taking charge of the conflict, requested the activation of three corps headquarters for its growing command of United Nations Command (UN) forces. The I Corps was reactivated at Fort Bragg, North Carolina, on 2 August 1950.

==== Pusan Perimeter ====
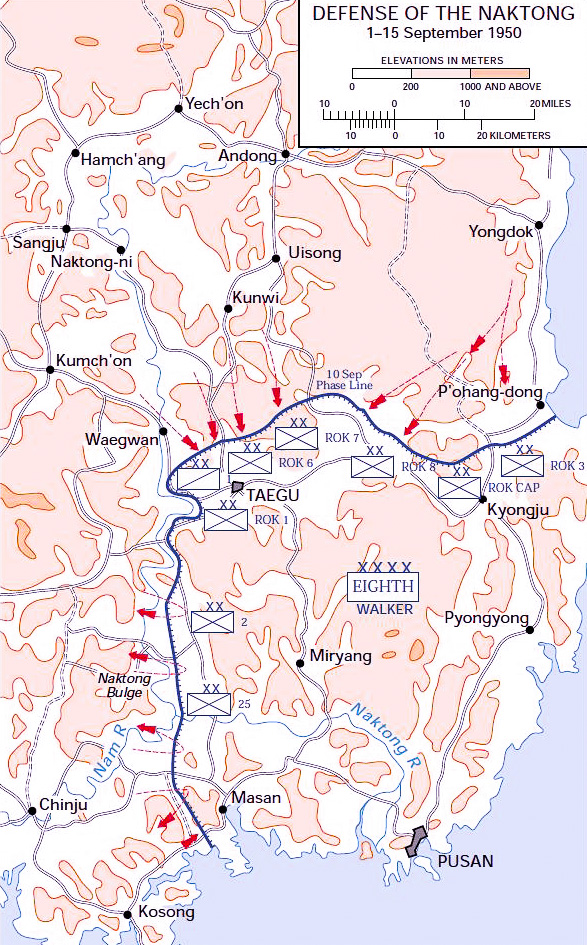
Defense of the Pusan Perimeter

Advance elements of the headquarters took their place in the Pusan perimeter on 27 August. The headquarters, designated "Task Force Jackson", assumed control of the Republic of Korea Army (ROK) I Corps, the 21st Regimental Combat Team and the 3rd Battalion Combat Team of the 9th Infantry Regiment. On 12 September, under command of Lieutenant General Frank W. Milburn, the corps became operational. It took command of the 1st Cavalry Division, 24th Infantry Division and the ROK 1st Infantry Division, along with the 27th British Commonwealth Brigade, defending the Naktong River area against attacking North Korean units.

Amphibious landings at Inchon by the X Corps hit Korean People's Army (KPA) forces from behind, allowing the I Corps to breakout from the Pusan perimeter starting on 16 September. Four days later I Corps troops began a general offensive northward against crumbling KPA opposition to establish contact with forces of the 7th Infantry Division driving southward from the beachhead. Major elements of the KPA were destroyed and cut off in this aggressive penetration; the link-up was effected south of Suwon on 26 September. The offensive was continued northwards, past Seoul, and across the 38th Parallel into North Korea on 1 October. The momentum of the attack was maintained, and the race to the North Korean capital, Pyongyang, ended on 19 October when elements of the ROK 1st Infantry Division and the US 1st Cavalry Division both captured the city. The advance continued, but against unexpectedly stiffening resistance. The Chinese People's Volunteer Army (PVA) entered the war on the side of North Korea, making their first attacks in late October. By the end of October the city of Chongju, 40 miles (64 km) from the Yalu River border of North Korea, had been captured.

==== Chinese intervention ====
The UN forces renewed their offensive on 24 November before being stopped by the PVA Second Phase Offensive starting on 25 November. The Eighth Army suffered heavy casualties, ordering a complete withdrawal to the Imjin River, south of the 38th Parallel, having been destabilised by the overwhelming PVA forces. In the wake of the retreat, the disorganized Eighth Army regrouped and re-formed in late December. The I Corps relinquished command of the 1st Cavalry Division, the 24th Infantry Division and the 27th British Brigade, taking command of the 3rd Infantry Division and the 25th Infantry Division in their place. On 1 January 1951, 500,000 PVA troops attacked the Eighth Army's line at the Imjin River, forcing them back 50 miles (80 km) and allowing the PVA to capture Seoul. The PVA eventually advanced too far for their supply lines to adequately support them, and their attack stalled. The Eighth Army, battered by the PVA assault, began to prepare counteroffensives to retake lost ground.

Following the establishment of defenses south of the capital city, General Matthew B. Ridgway ordered the I, IX and X Corps to conduct a general counteroffensive against the PVA/KPA, Operation Thunderbolt. Between February and March, the corps participated in Operation Killer, pushing PVA forces north of the Han River. This operation was quickly followed up with Operation Ripper, which retook Seoul in March. After this Operation Rugged and Operation Dauntless in April saw Eighth Army forces advance north of the 38th Parallel and reestablish themselves along the Kansas Line and Utah Line, respectively.

As I Corps troops approached the Iron Triangle formed by the cities of Cheorwon, Kumhwa and Pyonggang, PVA/KPA resistance increased. By that time, the ROK 1st Infantry Division was relieved from the corps and assigned to one of the Korean corps. The 1st Cavalry Division was returned to the corps in its place.

In late April, the PVA launched a major counterattack. Though the 24th and 25th Infantry Divisions were able to hold their ground against the PVA 9th Army Corps, the ROK 6th Infantry Division, to the east, was destroyed by the PVA 13th Army Corps, which penetrated the line and threatened to encircle the American divisions. The 1st Marine Division and the 27th British Commonwealth Brigade were able to drive the PVA 13th Army Corps back while the 24th and 25th Divisions withdrew on 25 April. The line was pushed back to Seoul but managed to hold. In May–June the UN launched another counteroffensive erasing most of the PVA gains.

==== Stalemate ====
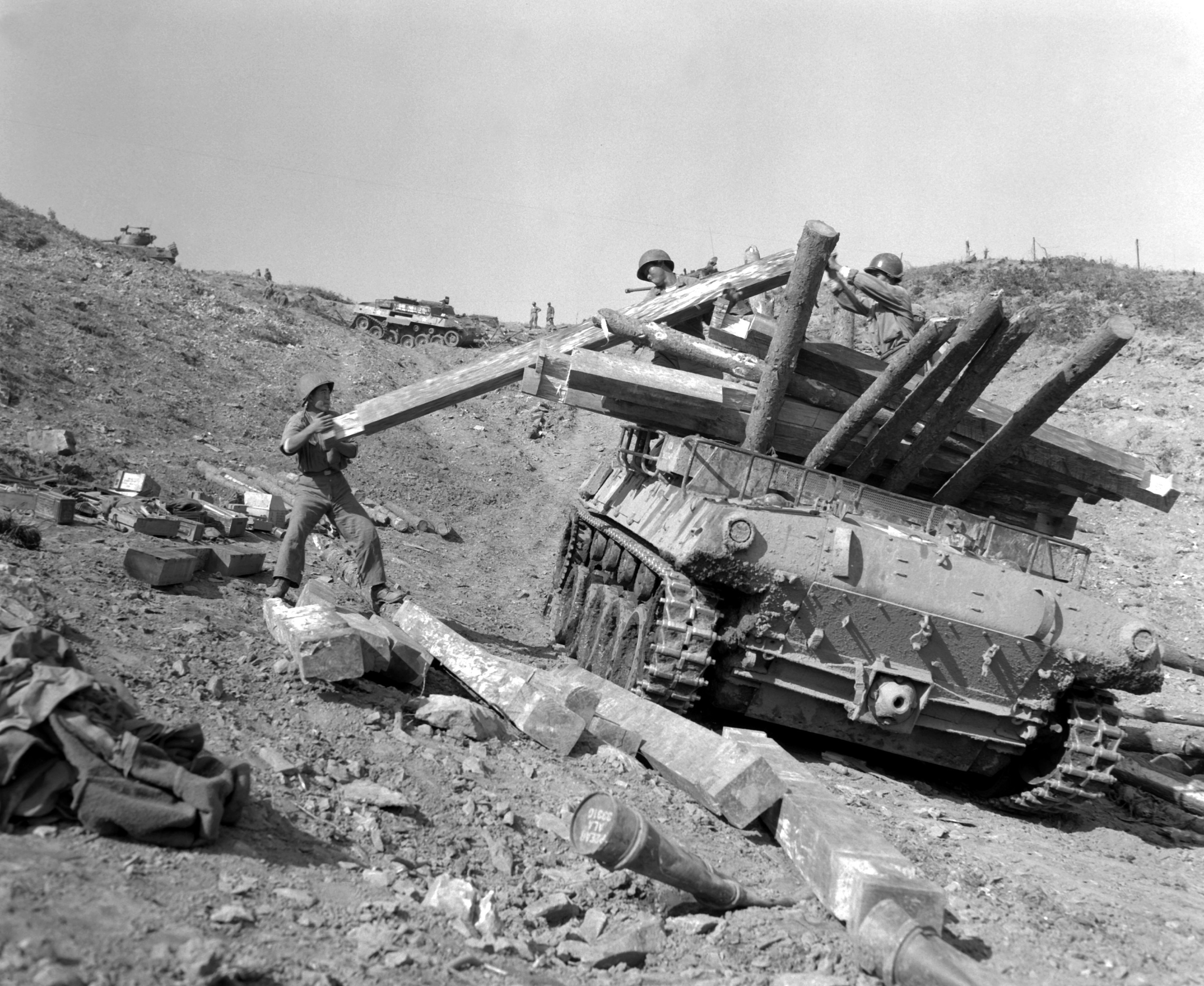
South Korean soldiers reinforcing defenses along Old Baldy Hill

In September, the UN Forces launched another counteroffensive with the 24th Infantry Division at the center of the line, west of the Hwachon Reservoir. Flanked by the ROK 2nd and 6th Divisions, the 24th advanced past Kumwha, engaging the PVA 20th and 27th Armies. In November, the PVA attempted to counter this attack, but were unsuccessful. It was at this point, after several successive counteroffensives that saw both sides fighting intensely over the same ground, that the two sides started serious peace negotiations. In late 1951, the 1st Cavalry Division, depleted after having suffered 16,000 casualties so far in the conflict, was relegated to the Far East reserve to rebuild. It was replaced by the 45th Infantry Division of the Oklahoma Army National Guard, which was newly arrived in the theater.

In March 1952, the corps grew in size as the 25th Infantry Division was relieved from its command and it gained command of 1st British Commonwealth Division and the ROK 1st, 8th and 9th Infantry Divisions. In June 1952, a ten-day attack against 45th Infantry Division outposts was repulsed. September 1952 began with renewed enemy attacks against the outposts that protected the main line. PVA/KPA attacks up to regimental size against garrisons of platoon and company strength were turned back by Corps troops. Outposts at Bunker Hill, The Hook, Kelly, Old Baldy Hill, Noris and Pork Chop Hill were defended in heavy fighting within the I Corps' area of responsibility. All along the front, the PVA/KPA were driven back with thousands of casualties.

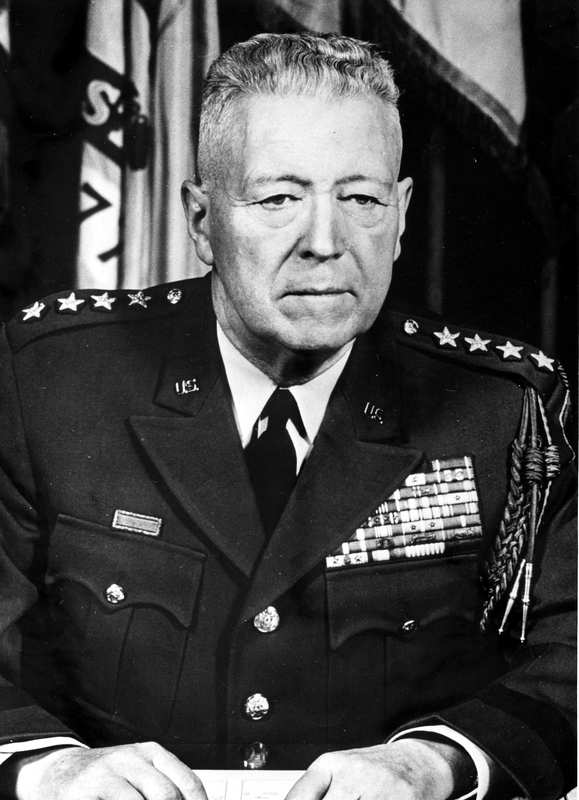
Lieutenant General Bruce Clarke, last commander of the I Corps during the Korean War

In January 1953, the corps underwent its last major reorganization of the war, losing command of the US 3rd, 24th and 45th Infantry Divisions, the ROK 8th and 9th Infantry Divisions and the British 1st Commonwealth Division, while taking command of the US 2nd, 7th, and 25th Infantry Divisions and the 1st Marine Division. On 23 January 1953, the first major action of the year was initiated with a raid by the ROK 1st Infantry Division against the PVA/KPA's Big Nori positions. The next months saw many such raids which harassed the PVA/KPA, captured prisoners, and destroyed defensive works. Beginning in March, the PVA/KPA continually attacked the corps outposts. In that month, troops on Old Baldy were withdrawn, on orders from the I Corps, after suffering heavy casualties from the PVA. On 10 April 1953 Lieutenant General Bruce C. Clarke, who was to see the corps through the remainder of its combat, assumed command.

The fighting on the outposts continued; the 7th Infantry Division stopped wave after wave of troops that the PVA threw against Pork Chop Hill. In late May troops of the Turkish Brigade, attached to the 25th Infantry Division, defended the Nevada Complex in fierce hand-to-hand combat. They were ordered to evacuate all but the Berlin position at the end of May. The 1st British Commonwealth Division ejected the PVA after their assault on the Hook. The ROK 1st Division troops were ordered off the positions on Queen, Bak and Hill 179 when heavy PVA/KPA assaults deprived them of their tactical value. The closing days of the fighting saw the 7th Infantry Division withdrawn from Pork Chop and the 1st Marine Division ordered to evacuate the Berlin positions for the same reason.

=== Cold War ===
The Korean DMZ along the 38th parallel

After the 1953 armistice, the defense of the Korean Demilitarized Zone was handled by the ROK and US armies. The eastern half of the border was handled by the ROK while the I Corps took charge in the west. For the next 18 years, the corps oversaw US forces on the DMZ, seeing only occasional incidents with the KPA. In 1971, under Nixon's détente policy, the 7th Infantry Division was withdrawn, leaving the 2nd Infantry Division as the only US Army unit in Korea. The I Corps remained in Korea as a two-division formation until 1972 when it was reduced to zero strength and was replaced in 1982 by the Third Republic of Korea Army (TROKA).

In 1980, Fort Lewis was notified of a major change of structure. A corps headquarters was to be activated in March 1982. The I Corps was formally activated on 1 October 1981, much earlier than expected. On 1 August 1983, the corps expanded its operational control of active Army units outside Fort Lewis, to include the 7th Infantry Division (Light) at Fort Ord, and the 172nd Infantry Brigade in Alaska, which then was expanded to 6th Infantry Division (Light). In 1988, the distinctive unit insignia was approved for the corps. This was the fourth design held by the corps, with previous versions being approved then retracted in 1942, 1970, and 1982.

=== Gulf War ===
Following the end of the Cold War in 1989, the US government conducted careful restructuring of national priorities and of the defense establishment. Fort Lewis, ideally located to act as a base for mobilization and power projection into the Pacific region, was one of few military bases that did not downsize with the US military overall. Thus, while most of the Army was downsizing, Fort Lewis began to grow, however, several tenant units such as the 9th Infantry Division were downsized.

The 3rd Brigade, 9th Infantry Division became the 199th Infantry Brigade, attached to the I Corps, remaining under the corps until its redesignation as the 2nd Armored Cavalry Regiment, and its departure for Fort Polk, Louisiana in 1993.

Also in 1990, the U.S. intervened in the Middle East with Operation Desert Storm. During that intervention, Fort Lewis deployed 34 active and 25 reserve component units to Saudi Arabia. The I Corps also contributed to the command structure, with the I Corps Commander, LTG Calvin A. H. Waller and the Deputy I Corps Commander, MG Paul R. Schwartz, assisting General H. Norman Schwarzkopf, the Commander of the American Forces. The I Corps expanded its contingency missions and became a quick-response corps. For several months, the I Corps was the nation's worldwide contingency corps, while the XVIII Airborne Corps was engaged in the Gulf War. This caused a good deal of activity on Fort Lewis, as the post restructured itself to support the corps' new mission, and to insure that it had a smooth, rapid departure in case they were needed anywhere in the world. This duty was returned to XVIII Airborne Corps upon its return to the United States. The corps then began to convert to a permanently structured, no-mobilization contingency corps and was placed under the operational control of the United States Army Forces Command. This entailed the addition of a number of active component corps units.

In preparation for these new requirements, Fort Lewis began to receive new corps support units which were coming out of Europe. One of these was the 7th Engineer Brigade which was inactivated on 16 January 1992 and immediately reactivated as the 555th Engineer Group. On 16 February 1992 the 210th Field Artillery Brigade, also from Europe, was activated. In 1997, the 35th Air Defense Artillery Brigade moved to Fort Bliss, Texas, to join other air defense brigades. The corps and Fort Lewis would see a reshuffling of units in and out of the area through 2000. Plans were drawn up for emergency operations for the I Corps should a major conflict emerge in the Pacific region. Plans exist for the I Corps to rapidly deploy in defense of Japan or South Korea.

=== War on terrorism ===
With the events of 11 September 2001, the I Corps began providing support for Army units deploying in support of the war on terrorism. Its assets were active in providing combat support and combat service support missions, including Operation Enduring Freedom in Afghanistan, Operation Iraqi Freedom in Iraq and the domestic Operation Noble Eagle.

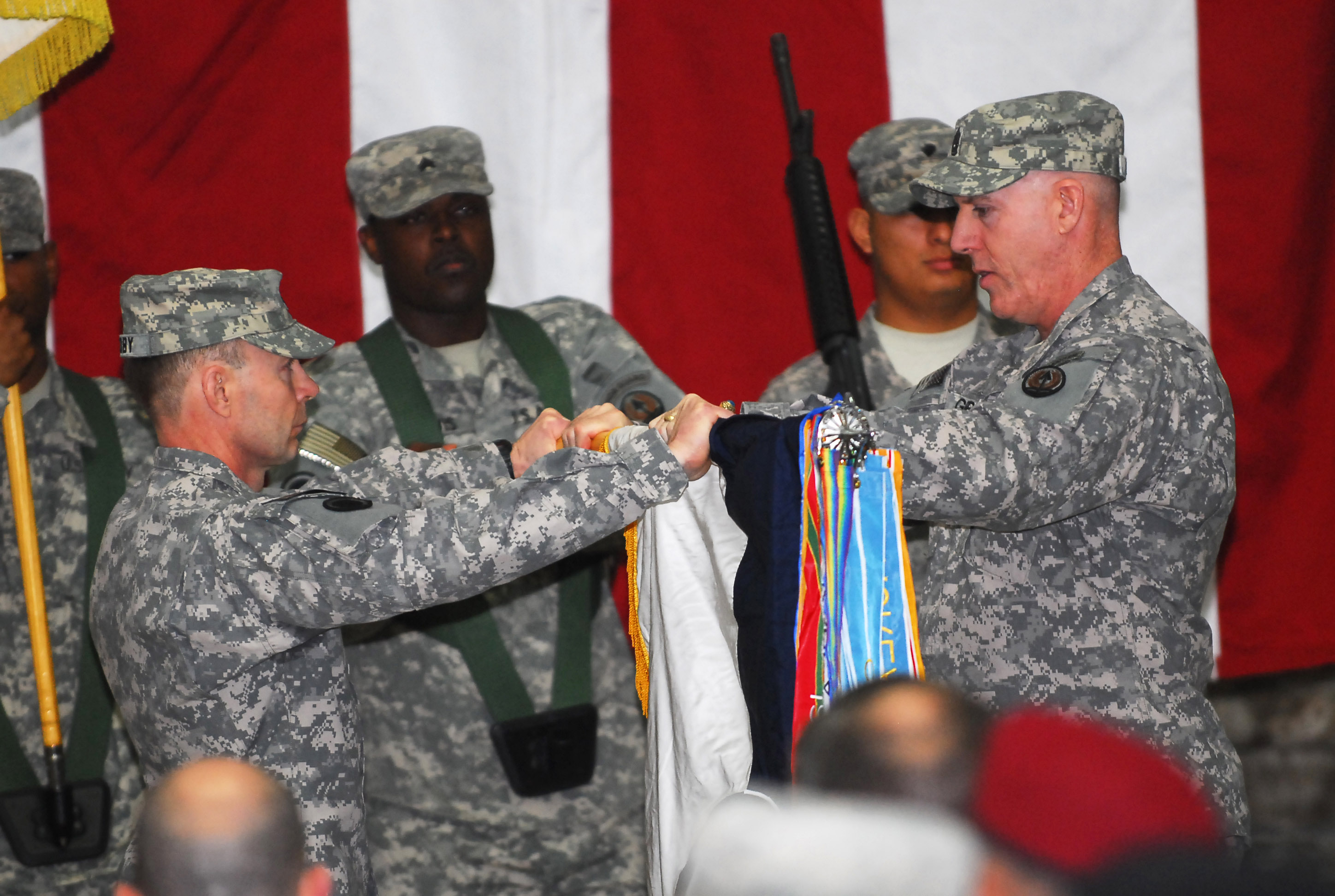
The I Corps uncasing its colors in Iraq

On 4 February 2004, the I Corps forward headquarters deployed to Iraq. The element, called Task Force Olympia, deployed to Mosul, Iraq in January 2004, where it assumed its mission from the 101st Airborne Division to form a headquarters to exercise command and control of all coalition and Iraqi forces in northern Iraq. It coordinated the efforts of both of the active Stryker Brigade Combat Teams, attached engineers, civil affairs, signal, and other supporting units as well as Iraqi security forces, eventually numbering more than 12,000. The Iraqi security forces included four Civil Defense Corps battalions, three Border Police battalions, several thousand members of the Iraq Facility Protection Security Forces and an Armed Forces battalion. After more than a year in Iraq, the corps forward headquarters handed over responsibility for northern Iraq to the soldiers of Task Force Freedom and 11th Armored Cavalry Regiment in February 2005.

In 2008, it was announced that the I Corps was to deploy to Iraq in 2009, to replace XVIII Airborne Corps in support of Operation Iraqi Freedom. Soldiers of the corps trained for a year in preparation for the deployment, which began on 9 April 2009. The I Corps filled the role of Multi-National Corps - Iraq at Al-Faw Palace. In January 2010, Multi-National Corps - Iraq integrated with Multi-National Forces - Iraq (MNF-I) and Multi-National Security Transition Command – Iraq (MNSTC-I) to form United States Forces - Iraq (USF-I). Over its one-year deployment, the corps oversaw the responsible drawdown of major components of US Forces in Iraq. I Corps returned from Iraq in March 2010 following their RIP/TOA with the III Corps.

The I Corps headquarters deployed to Afghanistan to serve as the headquarters of the International Security Assistance Force Joint Command (IJC) for a period of one year. The commander of the I Corps, Lieutenant General Curtis Scaparrotti, served concurrently as the commander of the International Security Assistance Force Joint Command and Deputy Commander, U.S. Forces – Afghanistan from 11 July 2011 to 11 July 2012.

=== Asia-Pacific shift ===
The I Corps shifted its mission to the Asia-Pacific region in mid-2012. The I Corps Commander Lt. Gen. Robert Brown announced this Pacific Rim rebalance during his Change-of-Command Ceremony at Joint Base Lewis-McChord. In late 2011, President Barack Obama and Secretary of Defense Leon Panetta signaled the Asia-Pacific pivot and made several trips to the region. The Pacific Rim Rebalance will involve several combined and joint military exercises in Japan, South Korea, Thailand, Philippines, and Australia. Part of the I Corps' objectives for these exercises will be Joint Task Force certification in support of United States Pacific Command missions. As part of the Army Transformation Initiative in late 2025, the Army consolidated oversight of Indo-Pacific forces. This included the reassignment of the 4th Infantry Division to I Corps to synchronize logistics and modernization efforts west of the International Date Line.

== Organization ==
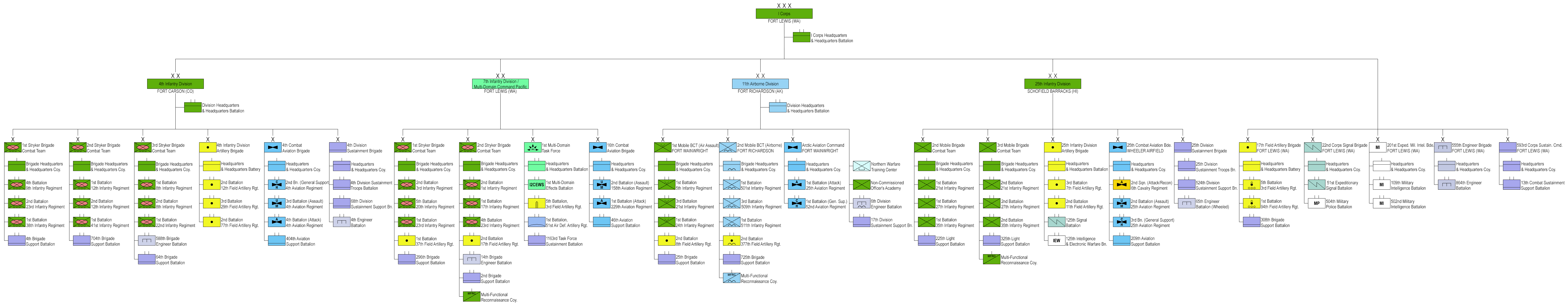
I Corps organization as of October 2026 (click to enlarge)

The I Corps is unique among the active US Army corps in that it is composed of a mixture of active duty and US Army Reserve units in 47 of the 50 U.S. states, for a total of around 75,000 Soldiers stationed in Hawaii, Alaska, Colorado, and Washington State. On Dec. 5, 2025, the Department of the Army reassigned the 4th Infantry Division from the III Armored Corps to I Corps. The division remains stationed at Fort Carson, Colorado, but falls under the operational and administrative control of I Corps to support operations in the Indo-Pacific theater.

- I Corps, Joint Base Lewis–McChord (WA)
  - I Corps Headquarters and Headquarters Battalion
  - 4th Infantry Division
  - 11th Airborne Division
  - 25th Infantry Division
  - 17th Field Artillery Brigade
  - 22nd Corps Signal Brigade
  - 62nd Medical Brigade
  - 201st Expeditionary Military Intelligence Brigade
  - 593rd Corps Sustainment Command

== Honors ==
The I Corps was awarded seven campaign streamers for service in World War I, three campaign streamers and two unit decorations in World War II, ten campaign streamers and one unit decoration in the Korean War, one unit award during Operation Iraqi Freedom, and one unit award in peacetime, for a total of 20 campaign streamers and five unit decorations in its operational history.

=== Campaign streamers ===
Conflict	Streamer	Year(s)
World War I	Champagne-Marne	1917
World War I	Aisne-Marne	1917
World War I	St. Mihiel	1917
World War I	Meuse-Argonne	1917
World War I	Île-de-France	1918
World War I	Champagne	1918
World War I	Lorraine	1918
World War II	Papua	1943
World War II	New Guinea	1944
World War II	Luzon	1945
Korean War	UN Defensive	1950
Korean War	UN Offensive	1950
Korean War	CCF Intervention	1950
Korean War	First UN Counteroffensive	1950
Korean War	CCF Spring Offensive	1951
Korean War	UN Summer-Fall Offensive	1951
Korean War	Second Korean Winter	1951–1952
Korean War	Korea, Summer-Fall 1952	1952
Korean War	Third Korean Winter	1952–1953
Korean War	Korea, Summer 1953	1953
Iraq War	Iraqi Sovereignty	2009–2010
Afghanistan War	Consolidation III	2011–2012

=== Unit decorations ===
Ribbon	Award	Year	Notes
Dark blue ribbon with a gold border	Presidential Unit Citation (Army)	1942–1945	For fighting in the New Guinea campaign
Vertical tricolor ribbon (blue, white, red) with gold border	Philippine Republic Presidential Unit Citation	1944–1945	For service in the Philippines during World War II
White ribbon with vertical green and red stripes on its edges and a red and blue circle in the middle	Republic of Korea Presidential Unit Citation	1950–1953	For service in Korea
A red ribbon with a vertical green stripe running down the center	Superior Unit Award	1999–2000	
Red ribbon	Meritorious Unit Commendation	2009–2010	For service in Iraq
Red ribbon	Meritorious Unit Commendation	2011–2012	For service in Afghanistan

== Notable personnel ==
- Paul D. Phillips, former deputy commander of I Corps Artillery (1960–1961); former oldest living West Point graduate, retired as a Brigadier General.

== See also ==
- Lewis Army Museum
- Complete list of commanders
- I Corps (Union Army)
- I Corps (Army of Northern Virginia, CSA)
- I Corps (Army of Tennessee, CSA)
- III Armored Corps
- V Corps
- XVIII Airborne Corps

== Sources ==
- Catchpole, Brian (2001). The Korean War. Robinson Publishing. ISBN 978-1-84119-413-4.
- Horner, David (2003). The Second World War, Vol. 1: The Pacific. Osprey Publishing. ISBN 978-0-415-96845-4.
- Malkasian, Carter (2001). The Korean War. Osprey Publishing. ISBN 978-1-84176-282-1.
- Marston, Daniel (2005). The Pacific War Companion: from Pearl Harbor to Hiroshima. Osprey Publishing. ASIN B002ARY8KO.
- Pimlott, John (1995). The Historical Atlas of World War II. Henry Holt and Company. ISBN 978-0-8050-3929-0.
- Varhola, Michael J. (2000). Fire and Ice: The Korean War, 1950–1953. Da Capo Press. ISBN 978-1-882810-44-4.
- Willmott, H.P. (2004). The Second World War in the Far East. Smithsonian Books. ISBN 978-1-58834-192-1.
