= Kwon Oh-eul =

South Korean politician (born 1957)

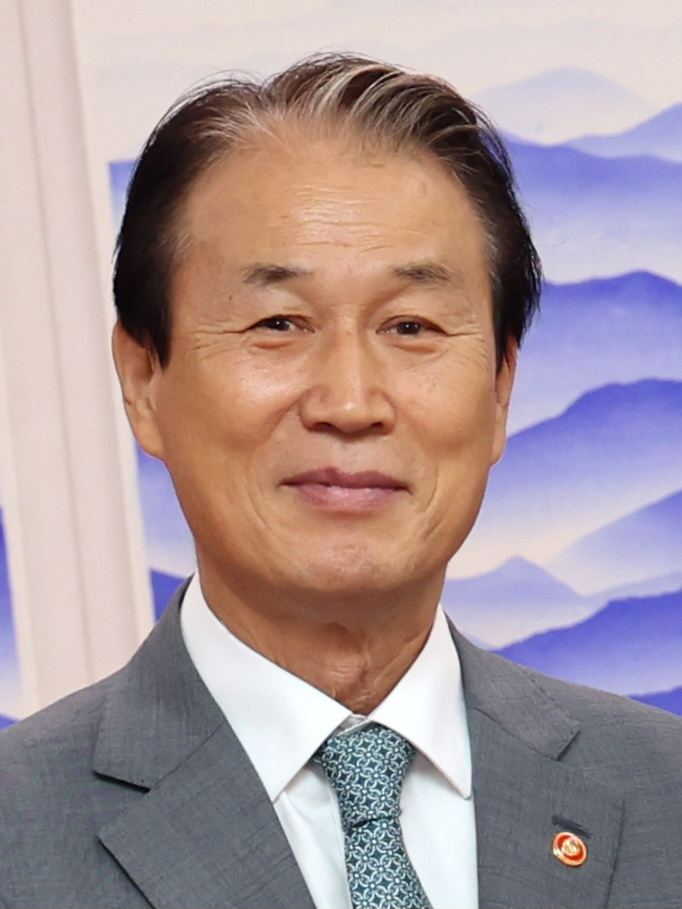
- Kwon in 2025

Minister of Patriots and Veterans Affairs
- Incumbent
- Assumed office July 25, 2025
- President: Lee Jae Myung
- Prime Minister: Kim Min-seok; Han Seong-sook
- Preceded by: Kang Jung-ai

Secretary General of the National Assembly
- In office 15 June 2010 – 26 December 2011

Chairman of the Agriculture, Forestry, Maritime Affairs and Fisheries Committee
- In office 2006–2008

Member of the National Assembly
- In office 30 May 1996 – 29 May 2008

Member of the North Gyeongsang Provincial Council
- In office 1 July 1991 – 30 June 1995

Personal details
- Born: March 17, 1957 (age 69) Andong
- Party: Democratic Party of Korea (2025)
- Other political affiliations: Reunification Democratic Party (1988–1990); Independent (1990, 2010–2011, 2016–2017); Democratic Party (1990) (1990–1991); Democratic Party (1991) (1991–1995); United Democratic Party (1995–1996); Democratic Party (1995) (1996–1997); Grand National Party (1997–2010, 2011–2012); Saenuri Party (2012–2016); Bareun Party (2017–2018); Bareunmirae Party (2018–2019); Independent (2019–2025)
- Education: Korea University
- Awards: Blue Stripes Order of Service Merit

Kwon Oh-eul (Korean: 권오을; born March 17, 1957) is a South Korean politician who has served as the minister of patriots and veteran affairs since 2025.

Kwon was the Secretary General of the National Assembly, a member of the North Gyeongsang Provincial Council, and a member of the National Assembly. In the National Assembly, he was the chairman of the Agriculture, Forestry, Maritime Affairs and Fisheries Committee.

== Biography ==
Kwon was born on March 17, 1957, in Andong. He graduated from Korea University and obtained a master's degree for Korea University Graduate School.

Kwon was a member of the North Gyeongsang Provincial Council from July 1991 to June 1995. Kwon was a member of the National Assembly from May 1996 to May 2008. Kwon was the chairman of the Agriculture, Forestry, Maritime Affairs and Fisheries Committee from 2006 to 2008. Kwon was the Secretary General of the National Assembly from June 2010 to December 2011. Before the election, Kwon joined the Democratic Party of Korea before the 2025 presidential election. Kwon has stated has he intends to push centrist and conservative beliefs in the Democratic Party of Korea.

He was first elected to the National Assembly as a member of the United Democratic Party. Before the 1997 election, he joined the Grand National Party because the United Democratic Party was merged into the New Korea Party. After not receiving a nomination for the National Assembly in 2012 and 2015, he joined the Bareun Party.

He was a visiting professor at Catholic University of Daegu, Hankuk University of Foreign Studies, and Shinhan University. Kwon received the Blue Stripes Order of Service Merit in November 2011. On June 23, 2025, Kwon has nominated to be the Minister of Patriots and Veterans Affairs and assumed office in July 2025.

== Election results ==
=== General elections ===
Year	Elections	Constituency	Political party	Votes (%)	Results
1996	15th National Assembly General Election	Andong A (North Gyeongsang)	UDP	19,749 (39.71%)	Won
2000	16th National Assembly General Election	Andong (North Gyeongsang)	GNP	43,994 (46.21%)	Won
2004	17th National Assembly General Election	Andong (North Gyeongsang)	GNP	50,470 (61.60%)	Won
2020	21st National Assembly General Election	Andong–Yecheon (North Gyeongsang)	Independent	5,937 (4.80%)	Defeated

=== Local elections ===
==== Governor of Gangwon ====
Year	Elections	Constituency	Political party	Votes (%)	Remarks
2018	7th Iocal Election	North Gyeongsang (Governoral Elections)	Bareunmirae	143,409 (10.19%)	Defeated

==== North Gyeongsang Council ====
Year	Elections	Constituency	Political party	Votes (%)	Remarks
1991	1991 Iocal Election	Andong 3rd	Democratic	9,751 (63.84%)	Won
