= Jo Woo-jin =

Jo Woo-jin (Korean: 조우진) is a Korean name consisting of the family name Jo and the given name Woo-jin, and may also refer to:

- Jo Woo-jin (actor) (born 1979), South Korean actor
- Jo Woo-jin (footballer, born 1987), South Korean footballer
- Jo Woo-Jin (footballer, born 1993), South Korean footballer who scored in the 2012 Korean FA Cup
