= Lee Woo-jin =

Lee Woo-jin (Korean: 이우진) is a Korean name consisting of the family name Lee (이) and the given name Woo-jin (우진). It may refer to:

- Lee Woo-jin (footballer) (born 1986), South Korean footballer
- Lee Woo-jin (born April 2, 2003), South Korean pool player
- Lee Woo-jin, former Produce 101 Season 2 contestant and former The East Light member
- Lee Woo-jin, former Produce X 101 contestant and Ghost9 member
- Lee Woo-jin (born 2005), volleyball player and member of the South Korea men's national volleyball team
- Lee Woo-jin, a character in the 2003 South Korean film Oldboy
