= Paik Sun-yup =

South Korean military officer (1920–2020)

Paik Sun-yup 백선엽 白善燁
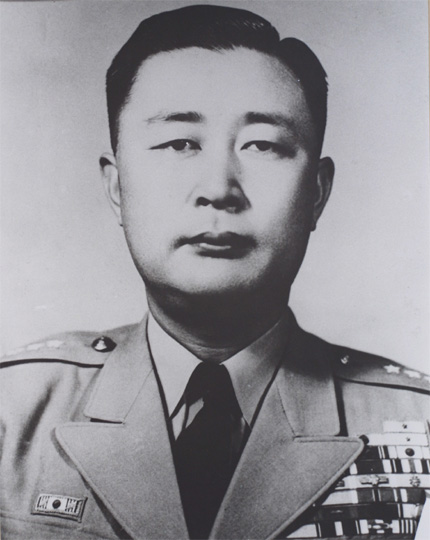
- 1951 Military portrait of General Paik Sun-yup
- Born: November 23, 1920; Chinnanpo-gun, Heian'nan-dō, Korea, Empire of Japan (now Nampo, South Pyongan Province, North Korea)
- Died: July 10, 2020 (aged 99); Seoul National University Hospital, Seoul, South Korea
- Military career
- Allegiance: Empire of Japan: Manchukuo; South Korea
- Branch: Manchukuo Imperial Army; Korean Constabulary; Republic of Korea Army
- Service years: 1944–1945; 1945–1946; 1946–1960
- Rank: Second Lieutenant; First Lieutenant; General
- Commands: 5th Infantry Regiment; 5th Infantry Division; 1st Infantry Division; I Corps; II Corps; Republic of Korea Army; Republic of Korea Armed Forces
- Conflicts: World War II; Korean War; Battle of Kaesong–Munsan; Battle of Pusan Perimeter; Battle of Pyongyang; Battle of Unsan; Battle of the Ch'ongch'on River; Third Battle of Seoul
- Awards: Gold Star‘Taegeuk' Medal of Merit x2; Eulji Military Medal x4; Chungmu Service Medal x2; Gold Tower Order of Industrial Service; Silver Star Service Medal; Truman-Reagan Medal of Freedom (2000); Order of Merit; Ordre national de la Légion d'honneur; Grand GwangHwa Medal

Korean name
- Hangul: 백선엽
- Hanja: 白善燁
- RR: Baek Seonyeop
- MR: Paek Sŏnyŏp

Paik Sun-yup (Korean: 백선엽; Hanja: 白善燁; November 23, 1920 – July 10, 2020) was a Republic of Korea Army four-star general who became the Chairman of the Joint Chiefs of Staff from 1959 to 1960. Paik is best known for his service during the Korean War, becoming the first four-star general in the history of the South Korean military, and for his service as a diplomat and statesman for South Korea.

== Early life and education ==
Paik was born in Tokhung in Kangso County, South Pyeongan Province (called Heian'nan-dō - the Japanese transliteration of the Sino-Korean name Pyeongan-namdo, i.e. south Pyeongan province - during Japanese occupation), Korea, Empire of Japan on November 23, 1920. He was the second of three siblings, with an older sister and younger brother, being raised by a widowed mother. In 1925 the Paik family moved to Pyongyang (called Heijō during Japanese occupation), where they lived under deplorable conditions in a single, rented room. Unable to feed her family, Paik's mother attempted to commit family-suicide with her children by jumping from the Taedong River Bridge (at the time the Daidō River Bridge) but was dissuaded from doing so by her eldest daughter.

Paik's mother and sister soon took jobs at a rubber factory, this in addition with the help of a greatly reduced tuition allowed Paik to attend Mansu Primary School for four years before transferring to Yaksong Primary School. After which, he spent five years in Pyongyang Normal School, studying to be a teacher. However, in 1939, instead of becoming a teacher, he entered the Mukden Military Academy of Manchukuo.

== Career ==
=== Early career ===
After graduation from the Mukden Military Academy, Paik became a second lieutenant in the Manchukuo Imperial Army and was assigned to the Gando Special Force, engaging in guerrilla suppression work in Jiandao (eastern Manchuria, Gando in Korean) as part of the Japanese campaign in northern China against the 8th Route Army of Communist China for ten months from 1944 to 1945 until its defeat by the Red Army. After the end of World War II, he returned to Pyongyang and started working as an assistant to Kim Ku (a leader of the Korean independence movement against the Empire of Japan). In December 1945, he fled south due to the rising communist presence. After safely reaching South Korea, he enlisted in the Constabulary, the predecessor of the Republic of Korea Army, as a first lieutenant. In this role, he was tasked with suppressing communist guerrillas (the Yeosu–Suncheon rebellion). While undertaking this responsibility, he helped Park Chung Hee, who was at the time being tried as a communist, by persuading President Syngman Rhee to commute his sentence and have him released. Paik eventually had him reinstated into the army during the Korean War. Before the outbreak of the Korean War, Paik was promoted to Colonel, from which he received the command of the 5th Infantry Division on July 30, 1949. Then on April 23, 1950, had his command transferred to the 1st Infantry Division.

=== Korean War ===
When the fighting broke out at 4:00 am on June 25, 1950, he was stationed in Seoul for officer training at the Infantry School. At 7:00 am, Paik was alerted to the invasion by the 1st Infantry Division's Chief of Staff.

Upon receiving the alert, Paik returned to his division, which was involved in heavy fighting near Kaesong and Munsan. After resisting the onslaught for three days, Paik received orders to stand his ground and fight to the last man as the division was the only remaining force between the North Korean People's Army and Seoul. However, after the fall of Seoul and due to the overwhelming offensive by North Korean armored units, he was forced into a fighting withdrawal. 1st Division was able to withdraw while maintaining its order of battle and fighting a delaying action. This led to Paik being promoted to Brigadier general on July 25, 1950. Paik then withdrew the division to the Nakdong River along the Pusan Perimeter, the last-ditch defense of the allied forces, on the southern tip of Korea. Here his division was responsible for the holding of a 55-mile front on the northern boundary of the perimeter. During this desperate battle that he successfully commanded the first joint operation between Korean and American Forces. Though his lines were stretched thin during this battle, the division successfully held off against successive assaults by the Korean People's Army 2nd, 3rd, and 15th divisions. During this time, the division received adequate anti-tank weaponry, which allowed them to form ‘hunter-killer teams’ and destroy KPA T-34-85 tanks. In August 1950, Paik along with Col. Michaelis, commander of the US 27th regiment, led the breakout from the Pusan Perimeter northward. The battle of Dabu-dong is seen as one of the major turning points of the Korean War.

The offensive northward and Paik participated in the recapture of his birthplace and the capital of North Korea, Pyongyang, on October 19, 1950. After spending several days securing the city, he was ordered further northward toward the Yalu River, on the Chinese border. It was Paik who was one of the first commanders to realize the People's Republic of China's intervention into the conflict. Paik, being fluent in Chinese, was personally able to interrogate the first Chinese People's Volunteer Army prisoners of war; however, his warnings of the intervention went unheeded by the overall theater command, who did not believe that the Chinese had entered the conflict. Later, once the threat of the Chinese was fully realized Paik would go on to assume command of the defense of northwestern Korea but was continuously pushed back both by the superior numbers and ferocity of the Chinese Second Phase Offensive. It was during this stage of the war that Paik was again promoted to the command of the ROK I Corps, which was tasked with the securing of eastern Korea. After he arrived to assume his new command, he found the corps to be made up of green recruits and conscripts who had neither sufficient training nor battle experience; because of this, he would spend much of his early time at this post intensively training his men and fortifying the battle line.

==== Armistice Negotiations ====
Armistice talks between the United Nations and the North Koreans and Chinese began in July 1951. Paik was selected as the South Korean representative. Paik was fundamentally opposed to the peace negotiations, fearing that it would lead to the abandonment of a unified Korea.

By August, Paik was told to report back to the I Corps where he oversaw the heavy fighting around the 38th parallel at the Punchbowl, and Heartbreak Ridge. His troops were now fighting a war of attrition, with both the United Nations and the PVA/KPA digging in and ever more fortifying their positions. Just as with the trench warfare of the First World War, the casualties were atrocious and there was little to show for the loss of life. In May 1952, Paik expressed to President Eisenhower the strong opposition of the Korean people to an armistice. However, due to the stagnation of the war, the armistice was signed with Korea remaining divided.

During the war, Paik did not make major mistakes, preventing the routing and disintegration of formations that plagued other commanders. He was also able to maintain a smooth relationship with the U.S. military officers. His actions and successes greatly contributed to the U.S. military's positive assessment of the Republic of Korea Army. This in turn, motivated the U.S. military command to recognize the ROK military as a useful ally in the then still developing Cold War.

== Later career ==
=== 1952 to 1986 ===
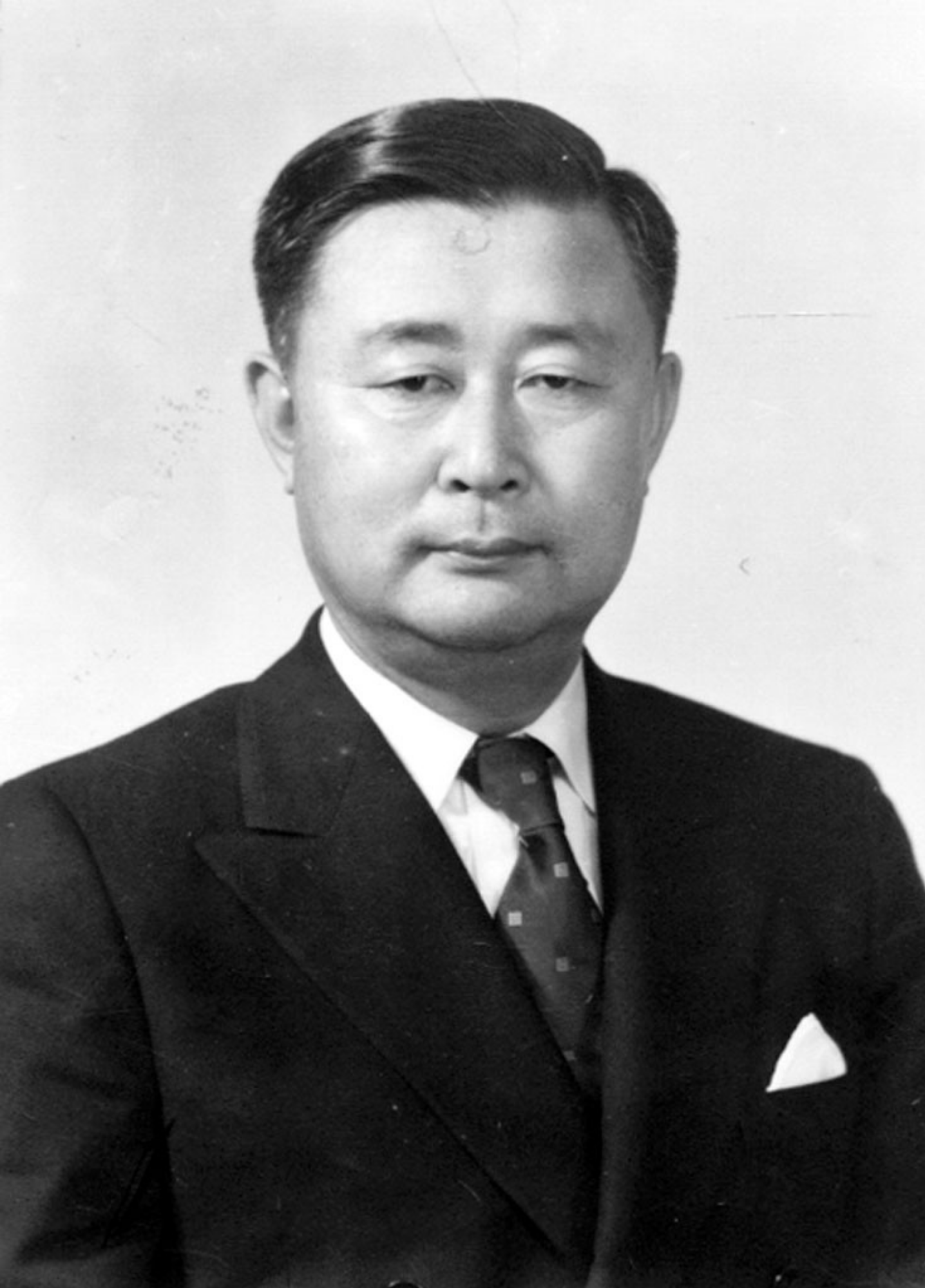
Paik in 1969, as Minister of Transportation

In 1952 and 1957 he was twice appointed as the Chief of Staff. Afterwards, in 1959 he was appointed as the Joint Chief of Staff of the Republic of Korea Army. After retiring from the military, he was appointed ambassador to the Republic of China in July 1960. In July 1961, he served as the Republic of Korea ambassador to France, the Netherlands, Belgium, Spain, Portugal and Luxembourg. On July 16, 1961, while serving as ambassador to France, he traveled to Senegal as a representative of the Korea-Senegalese Friendship Mission. There he met with Senegalese Prime Minister Dudu Thiam. In 1961, he served as ambassador to Gabon, Togo, Senegal, Chad, The Congo, Madagascar, Central African Republic, Niger, Ivory Coast, Benin, Republic of the Congo, Upper Volta and Mauritania. On August 27, 1963, while serving as the South Korean ambassador to Cameroon, Paik (then adjunct ambassador to France), established relations with President Amadou Ahizo.

In July 1965, Paik served as the first Korean Ambassador to Canada, after which he was appointed the Minister of Transportation of Korea in October 1969. Paik directed the construction of Seoul's public transportation infrastructure, which included the subway system.

In 1971, he was appointed president of Chungju Fertilizer Co., and served as president of Korea Integrated Chemical Inc. After which, he was appointed as the director of the National Economic Association. Then in 1972, he completed a CEO course at Yonsei University business school and in 1973 was presented a certificate by the chief executive officer of Korea University business school.

He was appointed president of Korea Chemical Industries in April 1973, where he directed the construction of the largest fertilizing manufactory plant in Southeast Asia at the time. He was later appointed president of adjunct Korea Chemical Pulp in 1974 and became president of the Fertilizer Industry Association in 1975. from 1976 to 1981, he served as director of the Korea Chemical Research Institute. In 1976, he completed a CEO course at Seoul National University business school.

In March 1981, he resigned from his position as President of Korea Chemicals. In March 1980, after resigning from the presidency of Korea Chemical Industries he was appointed as an adviser to Fujitsu Korea. Later he was appointed the chairman of the Korea Chemical Research Institute, director of the Korea Chemical Research Institute, and National Chairperson of the International Chamber of Commerce and Industry and was appointed to the permanent Advisory Office of the National Unification Agency in 1986, which included conducting security and lecture activities.

=== 1998 to 2020 ===
In 1998, he was appointed chairman of the Commemorative Projects Committee on the 50th anniversary of the Korean War. From 1999 to 2001 he was selected to be the Advisory Chairman of the Advisory Committee of the No Gun Ri Incident Countermeasures Group.

In 2008, in the Pro-Japanese Personalities and People's Exhibition published by the Institute for National Affairs included Paik in the military section of prospective chinilpa candidates, due to his prior service in the Manchukuo Imperial Army. Furthermore, in 2009, the Roh Moo-hyun administration's National Behavior Commission included Paik Sun-yup in the highly controversial list of 705 chinilpas. In May 2008, he was appointed as an advisor to the Committee to Promote the 60th Anniversary of the Founding of the Republic of Korea. On March 23, 2009, it was reported that the South Korean government planned to honor Paik as an honorary marshal in honor of the 60th anniversary of the outbreak of the Korean War. If implemented, Paik would have become South Korea's first marshal, this however would not come to fruition.

In 2013, the U.S. military in Korea appointed him as an "Honorary U.S. 8th Army Commander" and as whom he would represent the U.S. 8th Army in Korea during various official events. In South Korea, President Lee Myung-Bak attempted to promote Paik Sun-yup to the position of the First Head of the ROK Armed Forces, but this was ultimately denied.

On January 30, 2019, a group in consisting of retired South Korean generals of which Paik served as an advisor, released a statement criticizing the administration of South Korean President Moon Jae-in and the Comprehensive Military Agreement which was signed with North Korea at the September 2018 inter-Korean summit in Pyongyang.

He died on July 10, 2020, at the age of 99, four months short of his 100th birthday and was buried in Daejeon National Cemetery. Ministry of Patriots and Veterans Affairs claimed the reason Paik was buried in Daejeon National Cemetery was because the designated area for generals in Seoul National Cemetery was full.

== Awards and decorations ==
Korean Decorations
Gold Star ‘Taegeuk’ Medal of Merit x4
Eulji Military Medal x4
Chungmu Service Medal x2
Hwarang order of merit
Military Medal of Honor (South Korea)
Korean War Service Medal
Gold Tower Order of Industrial Service
Tin Tower Order of Industrial Service
Grand GwangHwa Medal x2
U.S. Decorations
Silver Star Service Medal
Legion of Merit (Degree of Chief Commander)
Legion of Merit (Degree of Commander)
Legion of Merit (Degree of Officer)
Legion of Merit (Degree of Legionnaire)
Bronze Star Service Medal
Air Service Medal
Department of Defense Medal for Distinguished Public Service
Meritorious Public Service Medal
Other foreign Decorations
Order of Merit (Canada)
Ordre national de la Légion d'honneur (France)
Ordre national du Mérite (France)
Croix de guerre des théâtres d'opérations extérieures (France)
Order of Leopold (Belgium)
Order of the Cloud and Banner (Republic of China)
Order of Brilliant Star (Republic of China)
Philippine Legion of Honor (The Philippines)
Order of the White Elephant (Thailand)
Cross for Law and Liberty (Netherlands)
Order of the Star of Ethiopia (Ethiopia)
National Order of Upper Volta (Burkina Faso)
Order of the Phoenix (Greece)
Order of George I (Greece)
Distinguished Service Medal of the Republic of Cuba
Order of Merit (Niger)
Order of the Sacred Treasure (Japan)
United Nations Service Medal for Korea (UN)

== See also ==
- Military of South Korea

== Notes ==
Diplomatic posts
Preceded by Kim Hong-il	South Korean Ambassador to China; 1960–1961	Succeeded by Choi Yong-duk
Military offices
Preceded by Yu Jae-Hyung (acting)	Chairman of the Joint Chiefs of Staff; 1959–1960	Succeeded by Yu Jae-Hyung (acting)
