= Battle of Gorangpo =

1950 battle of the Korean War

- Part of Korean War
Date	25–26 June 1950
Location	Gorangpo-ri, Jangnam-myeon, Yeoncheon County, Gyeonggi-do, South Korea
Result	DPRK victory; Successful ROK withdrawal

Belligerents
North Korea	South Korea

Commanders and leaders
Choe Kwang	Paik Sun-yup

Strength
1st Infantry Division; 6th Infantry Division	1st Infantry Division

The Battle of Gorangpo was one of a series of coordinated attacks beginning on 25 June 1950 that marked the beginning of the Korean War.

== Order of battle ==
=== Democratic People's Republic of Korea ===
- 1st Infantry Division - Brigadier General Choe Kwang
  - 1st Infantry Regiment - Colonel Hwang Seok
  - 2nd Infantry Regiment - Colonel Kim Yang-choon
  - 3rd Infantry Regiment - Senior Colonel Lee Chang-kwon
  - Artillery Regiment - Colonel Hyun Hak-bong
- 6th Infantry Division - Brigadier General Bang Ho-san
  - 13th Infantry Regiment - Colonel Kim Hoo-jin
  - 14th Infantry Regiment - Colonel Han Il-rae
  - 15th Infantry Regiment - Colonel Kim Hyun-ki
  - Artillery Regiment - Senior Colonel Lim Hae-min

=== Republic of Korea ===
- 1st Infantry Division - Colonel Paik Sun-yup
  - 11th Infantry Regiment - Colonel Choe Kyung-rok
  - 12th Infantry Regiment - Lieutenant Colonel Kim Jeom-gon
  - 13th Infantry Regiment - Colonel Kim Ik-ryeol
  - 15th Infantry Regiment - Colonel Choe Young-hee
