= Hwang Ki-chul =

South Korean Navy officer (born 1956)

- 황기철
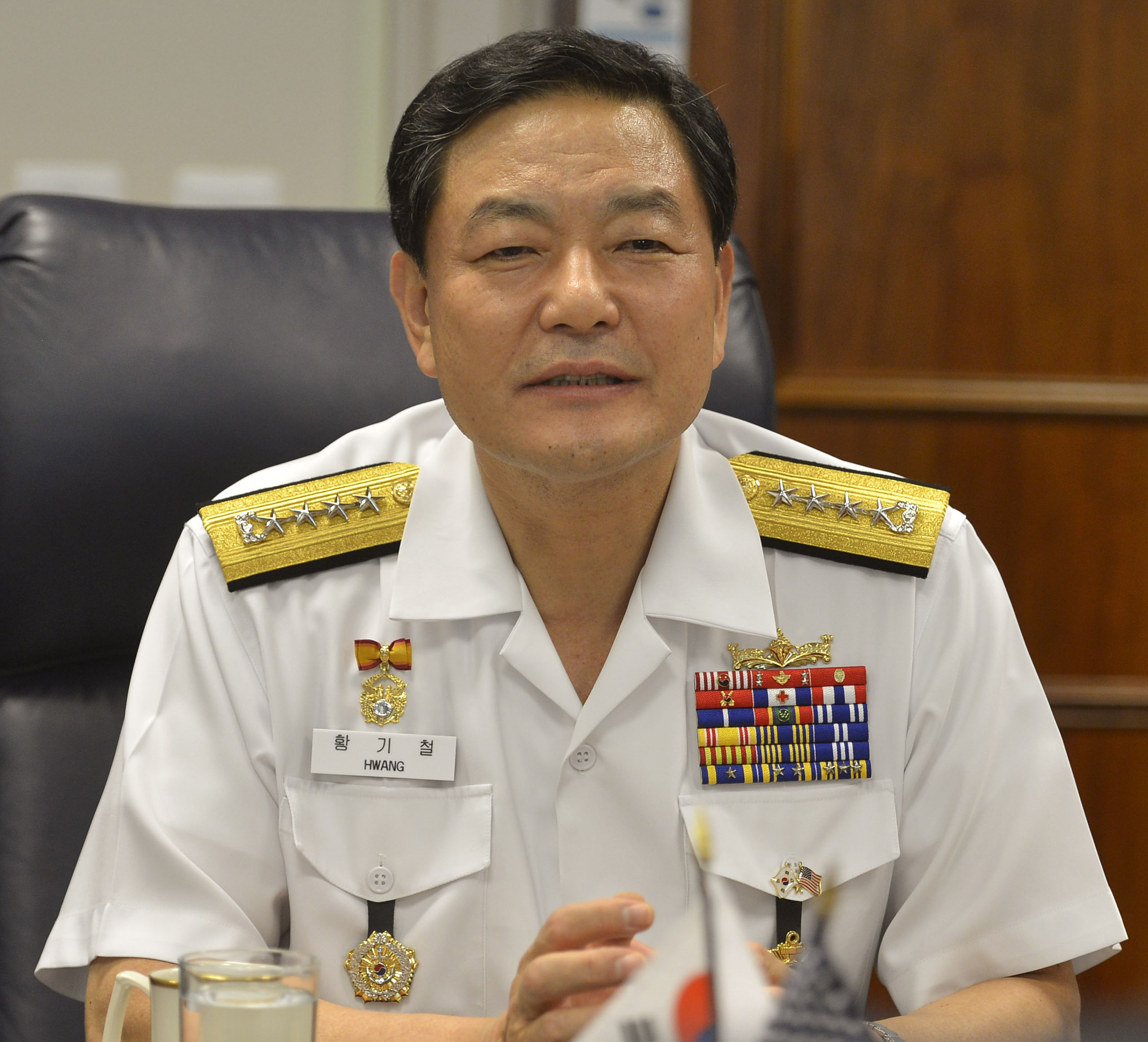

Minister of Patriots and Veterans Affairs
- In office 31 December 2020 – 12 May 2022
- President: Moon Jae-in
- Prime Minister: Chung Sye-kyun; Kim Boo-kyum
- Preceded by: Park Sam-duk
- Succeeded by: Park Min-shik

Chief of Naval Operations
- In office 28 September 2013 – 27 February 2015
- President: Park Geun-hye
- Preceded by: Choi Yoon-hee
- Succeeded by: Jung Ho-sub

Superintendent of Korea Naval Academy
- In office 6 November 2012 – 27 September 2013

Vice Chief of Naval Operations
- In office 21 November 2011 – 2 November 2012

Personal details
- Born: 2 September 1956 (age 70) Changwon, South Korea
- Education: Korea Naval Academy; Korea University; Pantheon-Sorbonne University

Korean name
- Hangul: 황기철
- Hanja: 黃基鐵
- RR: Hwang Gicheol
- MR: Hwang Kich'ŏl

Hwang Ki-chul (Korean: 황기철; born 2 September 1956) is a South Korean ex-Navy chief served as the Minister of Patriots and Veterans Affairs from 2020 to 2022.

Hwang previously served as deputy chief of navy during Lee Myung-bak administration from 2011 to 2012 and its chief during the following Park Geun-hye administration from 2013 to 2015. He also served as the head of his alma mater from 2012 to 2013.

On 14 August 2021, Hwang visited Kazakhstan as the president's special envoy to retrieve the body of Hong Beom-do, the general commander of Korean independence army against Japanese rule over Korea.

He first entered politics in 2017. He joined then-candidate Moon Jae-in's presidential campaign in 2017. In the 2020 general election, he ran for Jinhae constituency which is his hometown and where major Navy facilities and his alma mater reside.

Hwang is a Korea Naval Academy graduate. He holds three degrees - a bachelor in French language and literature from Korea University, a master's in history from University of Paris 1 Pantheon-Sorbonne and an MBA from Kyung Hee University. He also completed a doctorate programme in political science at Hannam University.

== Effective dates of promotion ==
Promotions
| Insignia | Rank | Year |
|---|---|---|
| | Admiral | 2013 |
| | Vice admiral | 2010 |
| | Rear admiral Upper Half | 2006 |
| | Rear Admiral Lower Half | 2001 |
| | Ensign | 1978 |

== Electoral history ==
| Election | Year | District | Party affiliation | Votes | Percentage of votes | Results |
|---|---|---|---|---|---|---|
| 21st National Assembly General Election | 2020 | South Gyeongsang Province Changwon Jinhae District | Democratic Party | 50,595 | 48.86% | Lost |

== Awards ==
- Order of National Security Merit by the government of South Korea (2017)
- Order of National Security Merit by the government of South Korea (2008)
