= Park Min-shik =

South Korean politician

- 박민식

Minister of Patriots and Veterans Affairs
- In office 13 May 2022 – 26 December 2023
- President: Yoon Suk Yeol
- Prime Minister: Han Duck-soo
- Preceded by: Hwang Ki-chul
- Succeeded by: Kang Jung-ai

Personal details
- Born: 20 November 1965 (age 60) Busan, South Korea
- Party: People Power
- Education: Seoul National University

Park Min-shik (born 20 November 1965) is a South Korean politician who served as the minister of patriots and veterans affairs from 2022 to 2023.

== Career ==
Beginning in 1996, Park began working as a prosecutor, where he handled a wiretapping case involving the national spy agency.

In 2008, Park won a seat in the Parliament representing Busan, and was reelected in 2012.

In May 2023, Park was appointed by President Yoon Suk Yeol to serve as the Minister of Patriots and Veterans Affairs. He was the first veterans minister to serve since the Ministry of Patriots and Veterans Affairs was upgraded from its previous sub-ministry level. As veterans minister, Park halted a move by the Gwangju city government to build a statue commemorating Korean Chinese composer Zheng Lucheng, who fought against the South during the Korean War. In December 2023, Park was replaced as Veterans Minister.

== Election results ==
Year	Elections	Constituency	Political party	Votes (%)	Results
2008	18th National Assembly General Election	Buk–Gangseo A (Busan)	GNP	30,215 (57.34%)	Won
2012	19th National Assembly General Election	Buk–Gangseo A (Busan)	Saenuri	38,601 (52.39%)	Won
2016	20th National Assembly General Election	Buk–Gangseo A (Busan)	Saenuri	38,527 (44.07%)	Defeated (2nd)
2020	21st National Assembly General Election	Buk–Gangseo A (Busan)	UFP	46,795 (48.58%)	Defeated (2nd)
2024	22nd National Assembly General Election	Gangseo B (Seoul)	PPP	52,354 (45.15%)	Defeated (2nd)
2026	2026 By-Elections	Buk A (Busan)	PPP	12,866 (15.76%)	Defeated (3rd)
