= 1st Infantry Division (South Korea) =

- 1보병사단
- 1st Infantry Division insignia
- Active: December 1, 1947 – current
- Country: South Korea
- Branch: Republic of Korea Army
- Type: Infantry
- Role: Guard unit
- Size: Division
- Part of: I Corps
- Garrison/HQ: Paju, Gyeonggi Province
- Nickname: 전진 (Jeon-jin / Forward)
- Motto: "천하제일 전진부대 (The Jeonjin Unit — the best under heaven)"
- Engagements: Korean War; Operation Pokpoong; First Battle of Seoul; Battle of Gorangpo; Battle of Kaesong–Munsan; Battle of Sangju (1950); Battle of Pusan Perimeter; Battle of the Bowling Alley; Battle of Ka-san; Battle of Tabu-dong; Battle of Pyongyang (1950); Battle of Unsan; Battle of the Ch'ongch'on River; Chinese Spring Offensive; Battle of the Imjin River; Operation Commando; Battle of the Noris; Third Battle of Seoul; Operation Thunderbolt (1951); Chinese spring offensive; Battle of the Soyang River; UN May–June 1951 counteroffensive; Operation Commando; Battle of the Noris

Commanders
- Current commander: Maj. Gen. Yang Jin-hyeok
- Notable commanders: Paik Sun-yup; Chun Doo-hwan

- 1st Infantry Division
- Hangul: 일보병사단
- Hanja: 一步兵師團
- RR: Il bobyeong sadan
- MR: Il pobyŏng sadan

The 1st Infantry Division (Korean: 1보병사단; Hanja: 一步兵師團), also known as Forward Division (전진부대; 前進部隊), is a military formation of the Republic of Korea Army and is unit is one of three divisions under the command of the I Corps. The division was established on 1947 under the command of Colonel Kim Suk-won.

== Structure ==
Current structure:

- Headquarters:
  - Headquarters Company
  - Intelligence Company
  - Anti-tank Company
  - DMZ Patrol Company
  - Air Defense Company
  - Reconnaissance Battalion
  - Engineer Battalion
  - Armored Battalion (equipped with K1 tanks)
  - Signal Battalion
  - Support Battalion
  - Military Police Battalion
  - Medical Battalion
  - Chemical Battalion
- 11th Infantry Brigade (equipped with K808 APCs)
- 12th Infantry Brigade – The brigade was originally activated as the 12th Regiment on May 1, 1948, at Kunsan and was first commanded by Lt. Col. Paik In Ki. The unit was not initially assigned to a division but was assigned to the 1st Division following that unit's activation in May 1949. It participated in the Battle of Pusan Perimeter.
- 15th Infantry Brigade (equipped with K808 APCs)
- Artillery Brigade (equipped with K9 SPHs and K239 MLRS)

== History ==
=== Korean War ===
The division was the first unit of the ROK Army to be attacked by the North Koreans on June 25, 1950. At 4 a.m. the North Koreans began an artillery barrage on the division's positions along the 38th Parallel. The artillery bombardment was quickly followed by ground attacks by the NKPA's 1st and 6th Infantry Divisions. It became part of II Corps after the first fall of Seoul, and was part of the defensive line to slow the North Korean advance from Seoul to Taejon. It subsequently fought in the Battle of Pusan Perimeter.

On October 19, 1950, Company F of the U.S. 5th Cavalry entered Pyongyang, followed shortly thereafter by 1st Division elements from the northeast. The next morning, the division reached the heart of the city and took the strongly fortified administrative center without difficulty. The entire city was secured by 10:00 that day.

=== Battle of Unsan ===
"In the western half of North Korea, as part of the U.S. I Corps' general advance on October 25, 1950, the 1st Division was spread out on the road that ran from the Chongchon River to Unsan. The division's 15th Regiment passed through Yongbyon and continued toward Unsan without opposition. In the lead were elements of Company D, 6th Medium Tank Battalion, which also passed through Unsan without incident. Just before 1100, as the tanks approached a bridge one and a half miles northeast of the town, enemy mortar fire destroyed the bridge. Engaging the enemy force, the soldiers reported a half-hour later that at least three hundred Chinese troops were in the hills just north of Unsan. The 12th Regiment, the second division unit in the column, turned west when it arrived at Unsan, and also ran into Chinese forces just beyond the town. The CCF's attacks against the 1st Division continued on the twenty-sixth but eased up the following day."

During the afternoon of November 1, the CCF's attack north of Unsan gained strength against the 15th Regiment and gradually extended to the right flank of the U.S. 1st Battalion, 8th Cavalry. At nightfall the 1st Battalion controlled the northern approaches to the Samtan River, except for portions of the 15th Regiment's zone on the east side. The battalion's position on the left was weak; there were not enough soldiers to extend the defensive line to the main ridge leading into Unsan. This left a gap between the 1st and 2d Battalions. East of the Samtan the 15th Regiment was under heavy attack, and shortly after midnight it no longer existed as a combat force.

== In popular culture ==
Lee Jin-tae and Lee Jin-seok, main characters in the 2004 Korean film Taegukgi, were assigned to the fictional 2d Company, 4th Battalion, 8th Regiment, 1st Infantry Division.
