= Battle of Pyongyang (1950) =

Battle of the Korean War

- Part of the Korean War
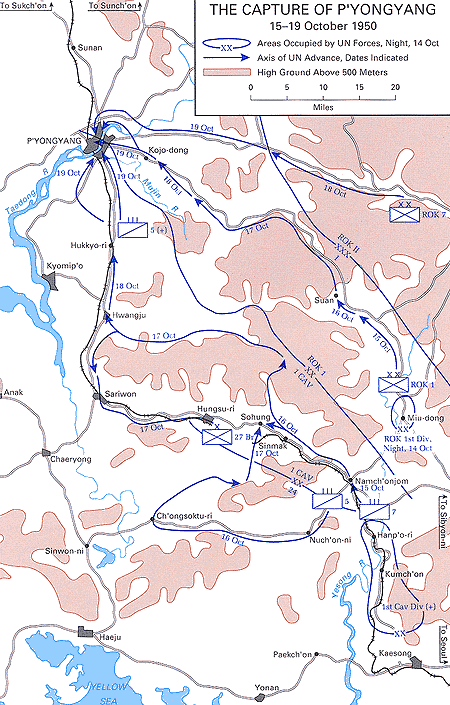
- Map of the capture of Pyongyang
Date	15–19 October 1950
Location	Pyongyang, North Korea 39°1′10″N 125°44′17″E
Result	United Nations victory
Territorial changes	United Nations capture Pyongyang

Belligerents
United Nations: United States; South Korea	North Korea

Commanders and leaders
(United States) Hobart R. Gay (First Republic of Korea) Paik Sun-yup	(North Korea) Choe Yong-gon

Units involved
(United States) 1st Cavalry Division (First Republic of Korea) 1st Infantry Division (First Republic of Korea) 8th Regiment, 7th Infantry Division	(North Korea) 17th Division; 32nd Division

The Battle of Pyongyang (17–19 October 1950) was one of the major battles of the United Nations' offensive during the Korean War. Following the Battle of Inchon, the UN forces re-captured Seoul, the capital of South Korea, and proceeded to advance into North Korea. Shortly after advancing, American and South Korean forces faced the North Korean defenses near Pyongyang, the capital of North Korea, on 17 October.

North Korea's leadership and its main forces had already withdrawn to Kanggye, allowing the UN forces to capture Pyongyang on 19 October.

== Background ==
It had become clear by the time the UN troops reached Sariwon that the remaining Korean People's Army (KPA) forces could not attempt a strong defense of Pyongyang without incurring total destruction or capture. The KPA by this time not only had to contend with US I Corps, approaching Pyongyang along the main Seoul axis from the south, but also the enveloping movements of the Republic of Korea Army (ROKA) forces from the southeast and east. Some of these forces, if they continued their rapid advance for a few days more, would almost certainly cut on the north the highways and exits from the city. Pyongyang would then be surrounded and any forces retained in and around the city for its defense would face either destruction or surrender.

The flanking operation originally conceived by UN commander General Douglas MacArthur for US X Corps after it had landed on the east coast at Wonsan had, in fact, been carried out by ROKA units under Eighth Army control before a single soldier of X Corps landed in the east. By the evening of 17 October four ROKA divisions were racing each other, as well as the American and British units of the I Corps, to be first to reach Pyongyang. The ROKA 1st Infantry Division only 15 miles (24 km) away to the southeast, was closest of all UN units to the city. On its right flank, the ROKA 7th Infantry Division was swinging toward Pyongyang from the east. Still further east the ROKA 8th Infantry Division had almost reached Yangdok in the central mountains where it would turn west on the Pyongyang-Wonsan lateral road. And, finally, the ROKA 6th Infantry Division was just short of Yangdok on this road, 50 miles (80 km) east of Pyongyang, after having turned west on 15 October from Wonsan on the coast, which it had reached by the road from Hwacheon. Thus, US I Corps was nearing Pyongyang from the south and southeast, the ROKA 7th Division from the southeast, and the ROKA 8th and 6th Divisions from the northeast. With approximately seven UN divisions converging on Pyongyang, obviously the KPA in its state of depletion, disorganization, and demoralization could not hold the city.

The Eighth Army intelligence officer estimated on 17 October that less than 8,000 effectives of the KPA 17th and 32nd Divisions were available for defense of Pyongyang. The estimate concluded that the KPA would undertake a token defense of the city while the main force withdrew northward across the Ch'ongch'on River for further operations.

== Battle ==
The 1st Cavalry Division had won the role of leading the attack into Pyongyang when the British 27th Brigade, attached to it, beat the 24th Infantry Division into Sariwon. Leading elements of the 19th Infantry Regiment, 24th Division, were still several miles south of Sariwon when orders came at 17:00 on 17 October to stop and hold up the attack because UN troops were already in the town. Morale in the 1st Cavalry Division was high. Most of the soldiers heard and passed on a rumor that the city was their final objective in the war, and once it was taken the American troops would leave Korea. Since the 7th Cavalry Regiment was the unit farthest north, 1st Cavalry Division commander General Hobart R. Gay ordered it to resume the advance on Pyongyang at daylight 18 October. The 3rd Battalion at Hwangju became the assault battalion even though its men were tired from their long night movement to the town.

At daylight on the 18th the 3rd battalion crossed the ford in Hwangju and began the advance. Resistance was light until the leading elements of the battalion arrived in front of the high ground south of Hukkyo-ri, halfway to Pyongyang. There KPA high velocity gun and heavy 120-mm mortar fire struck the column. Captain Webel, the regimental S-3, estimated that a reinforced battalion of about 800 men held the prepared KPA defensive positions. Twenty tanks of C Company, 70th Tank Battalion supported the battalion, but they had to contend with fire from three or four dug-in KPA tanks and a mined roadway. In the midst of the fighting, KPA small arms fire shot down an F-51 fighter plane. General Frank W. Milburn, the I Corps' commander, watched the action from an apple orchard at the side of the road, and about midafternoon Gay came up and joined him. Dissatisfied with the progress of the attack, Gay ordered the regimental commander, Colonel James K. Woolnough, who had temporarily replaced Colonel Harris, to start the other two battalions on flank movements against the enemy-held ridge. Webel protested to Gay that the KPA position was all but taken and that commitment of the other two battalions was unnecessary. But Gay let the order stand when he learned from Woolnough that the latter had already started to implement it. The two battalions upon coming up moved off toward the KPA flanks in what proved to be a nightlong movement. The next morning they found the enemy positions abandoned.

After giving the order on the 18th for a full regimental attack on the Hukkyo-ri position, Gay informed Woolnough that the 5th Cavalry Regiment would pass through the 7th Cavalry the next morning and take up the attack on Pyongyang. He then went back and found 5th Cavalry commander, Colonel Marcel Crombez and gave him the order. The 5th Cavalry Regiment was still strung out on the mountainous secondary road it had been traveling behind the 7th Cavalry from Sohung to Hwangju. Crombez did not have the last battalion in bivouac until 23:00 that night. At 05:00 on 19 October Lieutenant colonel Paul Clifford's 2nd Battalion, 5th Cavalry Regiment, led north out of Hwangju. When it arrived at the 7th Cavalry lines at Hukkyo-ri those troops had just repulsed a KPA counterattack. At this point three KPA tanks rumbled up and were knocked out by a 5th Cavalry Bazooka team. F Company, led by 1st Lieutenant James H. Bell, reinforced with five tanks, a platoon of engineers, and a section of heavy machine guns, now passed through the 7th Cavalry and led the 5th Cavalry Regiment toward Pyongyang. Just as Bell was passing the first of the burning enemy tanks a friendly plane swooped down and rocketed it. The concussion almost made him a casualty. Flights of jet planes coursed overhead in advance of F Company and, on at least two occasions, they helped supporting artillery reduce KPA forces that threatened to delay its advance. Crombez, and a small command group followed immediately behind F Company most of the morning and pushed it hard.

At 11:02, Bell's F Company reached the 20 yards (18 m) wide Mujin-ch'on River, a tributary of the Taedong River at the southern edge of Pyongyang. KPA troops from behind a 20 feet (6.1 m) embankment on the north side defended the highway bridge over it with three antitank guns. Bell's troops were delayed there for about half an hour until their mortar fire caused the KPA gun crews to abandon the antitank guns. Bell's F Company then crossed the Mujin-ch'on and entered the southwestern edge of Pyongyang. Bell received orders to turn west and seize certain factory buildings, the railroad bridges, and a bridgehead on the north bank of the Taedong. In about half an hour he reached the river's southern bank and found that only one span of each of the two railroad bridges (each 3-span) was intact. After a hasty examination of the eastern bridge, Bell decided that infantry could cross on one of its spans to an island in the river. Leaving some riflemen and the Engineer platoon at its southern end to guard the tanks which gave supporting fire, he led the rest of F Company across to the island and secured it by midafternoon. While F Company was crossing to the island, KPA on the north bank destroyed a section of the bridge still intact there. During the afternoon the 3rd Battalion, 5th Cavalry, crossed to the island and relieved F Company, which then moved back to the airfield on the south bank.

While F Company was trying to seize the railroad bridges over the Taedong, the rest of the 2nd Battalion crossed the Mujin-ch'on and turned right toward the main highway bridge which crossed the Taedong River about midway on the city waterfront. This was the only bridge still intact on 19 October when UN troops entered Pyongyang. When the leading elements of E and G Companies neared the bridge the KPA blew up the center span. Almost simultaneously with the 1st Cavalry Division's arrival at Pyongyang the ROKA 1st Division entered the city on the Sibyon-ni-Pyongyang road at a point northeast of the 1st Cavalry Division. On the night of 18 October the chances had appeared excellent for the ROKA 1st Division to be first into Pyongyang. After a day of very heavy fighting in which it gained 2 miles (3.2 km), it was only 8 miles (13 km) away, while the leading elements of the 1st Cavalry Division were about 30 miles (48 km) away. But the KPA made a stronger fight against the ROKA 1st Division than against the 1st Cavalry Division, possibly because it was closer to the city and the more immediate threat. Also, the road on which the ROKA approached Pyongyang was heavily mined with both antipersonnel and antitank mines. The division fought throughout the rainy night and finally overcame a KPA strongpoint an hour or two after daybreak. KPA emplacements and automatic fire stopped the ROKA infantry again about 6 miles (9.7 km) from the city near Kojo-dong. In the ensuing ROKA attack, tanks of C Company, 6th Tank Battalion enveloped the KPA positions from both flanks, destroyed self-propelled guns, and overran the KPA entrenchments, physically crushing machine guns and KPA soldiers. It was estimated that the tanks in this action killed nearly 300 North Koreans. According to ROKA 1st Division commander General Paik Sun-yup, extensive minefields in the street behind the overrun KPA positions delayed the tanks, but the infantry of the ROKA 2nd Battalion, 12th Regiment, kept moving and Paik affirms that they arrived at the edge of the Taedong River just before 11:00 and deployed along the south bank northeast of the highway bridge. Leading elements of the 2nd Battalion, 5th Cavalry Regiment, arrived at the traffic circle 100 yards (91 m) east of the highway bridge almost at the same time. The leading tanks of C Company, 6th Tank Battalion, were in the southern edge of the city, according to their own records, at 12:45. Tanks of D Company, 6th Medium Tank Battalion, entered the city along the same approach a little later, turned north, and together with troops of the ROKA 11th Regiment secured the airfield at 14:40. Other ROKA units earlier had secured a smaller airfield a few miles to the east.

After the KPA blew the highway bridge across the Taedong, elements of the 2nd Battalion, 5th Cavalry, continued northeast along the river searching for a ford reported to be located there. When they found it a few miles east of the city they discovered that elements of the ROKA 15th Regiment, 1st Division, had already crossed the river there, and others were then in the act of crossing into the main part of the city. Later, Crombez asked Paik how his troops found the ford so quickly. Paik answered, "I am a native of Pyongyang. I know the fords." By dark most of the ROKA 1st Division was in the main part of Pyongyang north of the Taedong River. Meanwhile, the 8th Regiment of the ROKA 7th Division swung into north Pyongyang from the east and was in possession of Kim Il Sung University in the northern part of the city by 17:00.

The next day, 20 October, the ROKA 1st Division advanced into the heart of the city and took the strongly fortified administrative center with ease. The KPA troops posted there were too demoralized to fight and they abandoned both guns and entrenchments. At 10:00 the ROKA 1st Division reported the entire city had been secured, including the City Hall, the Provincial Government offices, and the North Korean People's Committee offices. The ROKA 8th Regiment aided the 1st Division by sweeping through the northwest section of the city and clearing it of KPA. As soon as Engineer assault boats could be brought up, the 3rd Battalion, 5th Cavalry, began crossing to the north side of the Taedong, and by noon that regiment, with the 3rd Battalion, 7th Cavalry, attached to it, was across the river. Bells in Christian churches pealed a welcome. The people appeared friendly and there were no disturbances.

When the operations of Eighth Army had progressed to the point where it appeared probable that Pyongyang would fall in the near future, the army on 16 October had organized a special task force known as Task Force Indianhead. Its name derived from the shoulder patch of the US 2nd Infantry Division. This task force was to enter the North Korean capital with the advance units of the 1st Cavalry Division. Its mission was to secure and protect specially selected government buildings and foreign compounds until they could be searched for enemy intelligence materials. Lieutenant colonel Ralph L. Foster, Assistant Chief of Staff for intelligence, 2nd Division, commanded the task force, which was built around K Company, 38th Infantry Regiment and six tanks of C Company, 72nd Medium Tank Battalion, and included Engineer demolition troops, automatic weapons vehicles of the 82nd Anti-aircraft Artillery Battalion, and counterintelligence troops. The task force secured most of its assigned objectives in Pyongyang on 20 October. It obtained a considerable amount of intelligence material, both military and political, which was turned over to a special team from GHQ, Far East Command, and transported by air to Tokyo. Twenty American prisoners escaped or were rescued from the North Koreans in the capture of Pyongyang. Most of the large number of prisoners held there, however, had been taken northward several days before the UN forces entered the city.

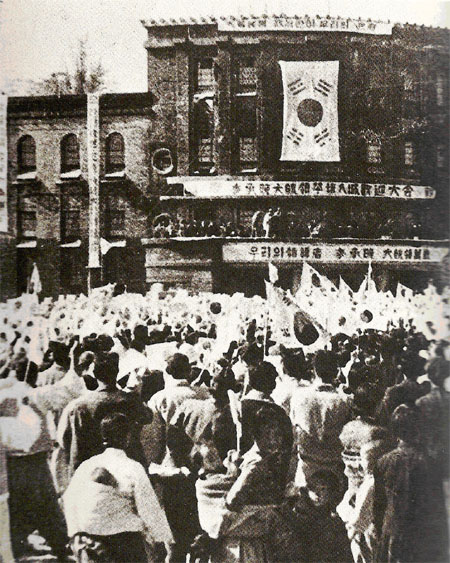
South Korean President Syngman Rhee speaking at the Pyongyang City Hall (30 October 1950)

Gay established his 1st Cavalry Division headquarters in the granite buildings of the North Korean Military Academy 10 miles (16 km) southwest of Pyongyang on the Chinnamp'o road. He was responsible for the internal security and order of Pyongyang after its capture. On 23 October he appointed Crombez civil assistance officer in the city because of the latter's special knowledge of the country and its people. Colonel Johnson, replaced Crombez in command of the 5th Cavalry Regiment until 14 December. The 5th Cavalry Regiment was disposed in the southern outskirts of Pyongyang, the 8th Cavalry Regiment in the northern outskirts, and the 7th Cavalry Regiment at Chinnamp'o, Pyongyang's port. After the fall of Pyongyang, Harris had led the 7th Cavalry Regiment in a forced night movement from the city 35 miles (56 km) southwest to Chinnamp'o. The regiment entered the port city in the dead of night, 22 October. On 24 October, General Walton Walker took personal command of his advance Eighth Army headquarters, established two days earlier by Colonel Collier of his staff, in the attractive and undamaged gray brick building in Pyongyang which had been the headquarters of North Korean Premier Kim Il Sung.

== Aftermath ==
The battle was followed by an airborne assault by the U.S. 187th Infantry Regiment 25 miles (40 km) north of Pyongyang, with the intention of cutting off North Korean units retreating from the city.

The city came back under North Korean control by 5 December after China intervened in the war.
