= Battle of Kaesong–Munsan =

1950 battle of the Korean War

Battle of Kaesong–Munsan–Bongilcheon
- Part of the Korean War; Operation Pokpung (North Korea); Operation Western Region (South Korea)
Date	25–28 June 1950
Location	Yonan, Kaesong, Munsan, Bongilcheon
Result	KPA victory Successful ROK withdrawal

Belligerents
Democratic People's Republic of Korea	Republic of Korea

Commanders and leaders
Choe Kwang; Pang Ho-san; Choe Yul-sok; Choe Hyon	Paik Sun-yup; Choe Yeong-hui; Yu Hae-jun

Strength
1st Infantry Division; 6th Infantry Division (-1 regiment); 203rd Armored Regiment (-1 battalion); 3rd 38-Guard Brigade (-5 battalions)	1st Infantry Division; 15th Infantry Regiment; Seoul Special Regiment

The Battle of Kaesong–Munsan–Bongilcheon (Hangul: 개성–문산–봉일천 전투; Hanja: 開城–汶山–奉日川 戰鬪) was a series of battles that occurred along the western region of the 38th parallel between 25 and 28 June 1950, as part of Operation Pokpoong (North Korea) and Operation Western Region (South Korea) that marked the beginning of the Korean War.

== Order of battle ==
=== North Korea ===
The combined strength of the 1st and the 6th Division was 21,000 soldiers with 24 M-30 howitzers, 72 ZiS-3 guns, 168 M-42 anti-tank guns. They were reinforced by 40 T-35-85s and 32 SU-76M self-propelled guns from the 203rd Armored Regiment.

Korean People's Army Ground Force

- 1st Infantry Division - Brigadier General Choe Kwang
  - 2nd Infantry Regiment - Colonel Kim Yang-chun
  - 3rd Infantry Regiment - Colonel Lee Chang-kwon
  - 14th Infantry Regiment - Colonel Hwang Sok
  - Divisional Artillery Regiment - Colonel Hyon Hak-pong
  - 203rd Armored Regiment (attached) - Colonel Choe Yul-sok
- 6th Infantry Division - Brigadier General Pang Ho-san
  - 1st Infantry Regiment - Colonel Kim Hu-chin
  - 13th Infantry Regiment - Colonel Han Il-rae
  - 15th Infantry Regiment - Colonel Cho Kwan
  - Divisional Artillery Regiment - Lieutenant Colonel Lee Min

=== South Korea ===
Due to the reorganisation of the Republic of Korea Army (ROKA), the quality of training of the ROK 1st Infantry Division was lower than that of other divisions. The 11th Infantry Regiment and the 12th Infantry Regiment just began battalion-sized training; only two battalions from the 13th Infantry Regiment were in the last phase of the training, and one battalion was sent away for the field training.

In addition, 57% of the soldiers were given leave on 24 June. Under the circumstances, the 12th Infantry Regiment had to defend 80 km frontline with only 800 troops. Moreover, heavy firearms and vehicles were sent to the rear for reorganization, and the division commander Paik Sun-yup was absent for training since 14 June.

Republic of Korea Army

- 1st Infantry Division - Colonel Paik Sun-yup
  - 11th Infantry Regiment - Colonel Choe Kyung-rok
  - 12th Infantry Regiment - Lieutenant Colonel Kim Jeom-gon
  - 13th Infantry Regiment - Colonel Kim Ik-ryeol

== Battle ==
On 25 June, the KPA 1st and 6th Infantry Divisions, supported by the 203rd Armored Regiment and the 3rd 38-Guard Brigade, launched a surprise supporting attack on the ROKA 1st Infantry Division to flank Seoul from the west while the KPA I Corps main attack concurred in the west central region of the 38th parallel defended by the ROKA 7th Infantry Division.
