= Woo-jin =

- Hangul: 우진
- RR: Ujin
- MR: Ujin

Woo-jin is a Korean given name. In 2008, Woo-jin was the fifth-most popular name for baby boys in South Korea, with 1,811 being given the name that year.

People with this name include:

== Entertainers ==
- Jo Woo-jin (actor) (born 1979), South Korean actor
- Noh Woo-jin (born 1980), South Korean comedian
- Yeon Woo-jin (born Kim Bong-hoe, 1984), South Korean actor
- Oh Woo-jin (born 1991), South Korean actor
- Kim Woojin (born 1997), South Korean singer and actor, former member of Stray Kids
- Park Woo-jin (born 1999), South Korean singer, member of Wanna One and AB6IX
- Seo Woo-jin (born 2015), South Korean child actor
- Kang Woo-jin (born 2007), South Korean singer-song writer

== Sportspeople ==
- Lee Woo-jin (footballer) (born 1986), South Korean football centre-back
- Jo Woo-jin (footballer, born 1987), South Korean football midfielder
- Hwang Woo-jin (born 1990), South Korean modern pentathlete
- Kim Woo-jin (archer) (born 1992), South Korean archer
- Jang Woo-jin (born 1995), South Korean table tennis player

== Other ==
- Pi Woo-jin (born 1956), South Korean female army helicopter pilot
- Christopher Yoo (chess player) (full name Christopher Woojin Yoo, born 2006), American chess player

== Fictional characters ==
- Lee Woo-jin, in 2003 South Korean film Oldboy

== Companies ==
- Woojin Industrial Systems, a South Korean train manufacturer

== See also ==
- List of Korean given names
