= Gyeongsangbuk-do Provincial Council =

Chief legislature of Korean province

- Hangul: 경상북도의회
- Hanja: 慶尙北道議會
- RR: Gyeongsangbuk-do uihoe
- MR: Kyŏngsangbuk-to ŭihoe

The Gyeongsangbuk-do Provincial Council (Korean: 경상북도의회) is the chief legislature governing North Gyeongsang Province, South Korea. The current chairperson of the Council is Lee Cheol-u. A chairperson, together with two vice-chairs, is elected twice for each term of the council, serving for two years.

The Council has 339 members, representing the various cities and counties of the province. The largest number of members (35) is sent by the large industrial city of Pohang. The smallest number (7) represent isolated Ulleung County and sparsely populated Yeongyang County.

The modern Provincial Council was established with the restoration of local autonomy. However, the first three Provincial Councils convened under the First and Second Republics in the 1950s and early 1960s. Thus, it was the fourth Council which finally convened again in 1991. The eighth Provincial Council will begin serving in July 2006.

== See also ==
- Politics of South Korea
- Subdivisions of South Korea
