= Pi Woo-jin =

- 피우진
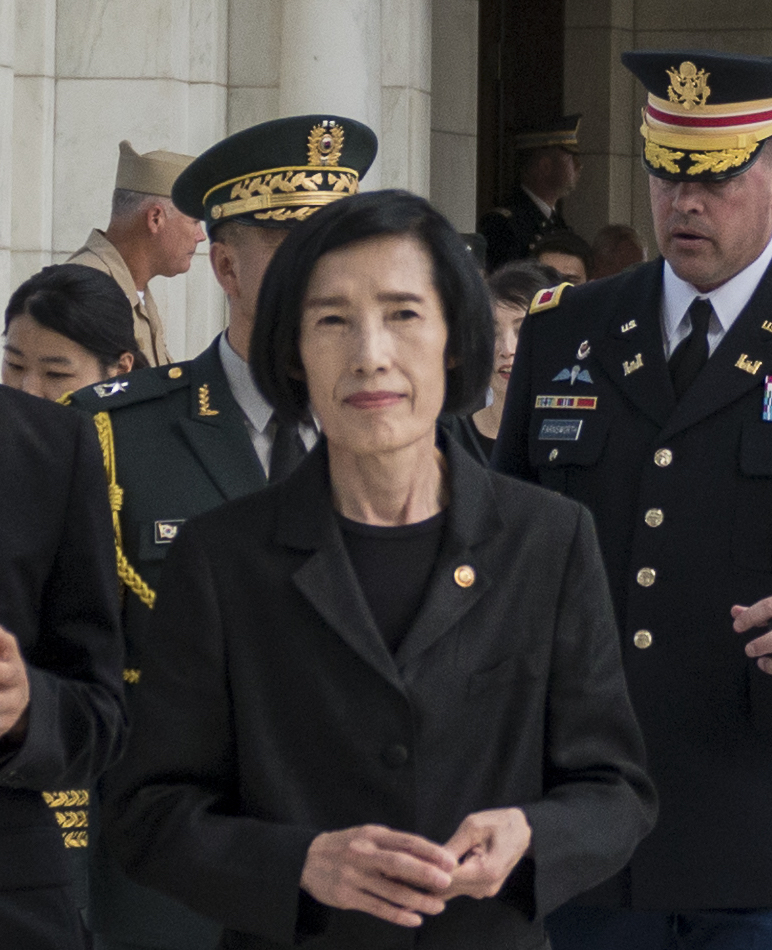

Minister of Patriots and Veterans Affairs
- In office 17 May 2017 – 15 August 2019
- President: Moon Jae-in
- Prime Minister: Lee Nak-yeon
- Preceded by: Park Sung-choon
- Succeeded by: Park Sam-duk

Personal details
- Born: 20 August 1956 (age 70) Chungju, South Korea
- Education: Cheongju University; Konkuk University

Military service
- Allegiance: South Korea
- Branch/service: Republic of Korea Army
- Years of service: 1979–2009
- Rank: Lieutenant Colonel (Korean: 중령)
- Unit: Army Aviation School; 1st ROK Army Headquarters

Pi Woo-jin (Korean: 피우진; Hanja: 皮宇鎭; born 20 August 1956) is a first-generation female helicopter pilot of South Korean Army previously served as President Moon Jae-in's first Minister of Patriots and Veterans Affairs of South Korea from 2017 to 2019. She is the first woman to lead this ministry.

After graduating from university in 1978, Pi worked as a teacher at a night school where she saw an ad from South Korean Army. In 1979 she was commissioned as a second lieutenant after passing the cadet exam and training. From 1981 she worked as a helicopter pilot after completing relevant training.

In 2002 Pi was diagnosed with breast cancer. After having a mastectomy on both breasts to avoid any discomfort in military service - even though only one was medically necessary - she returned to health and therefore army. In 2006 she was discharged for being diagnosed with disability as defined by the military code.

During the lawsuit to overthrow the decision and be reinstated to the army, she ran as a proportional representative candidate for the New Progressive Party in the 2008 general election. She quit the party as soon as she won the legal battle since no military officer can hold party membership.

In 2009 Pi rejoined the army and led the Department of Training and Doctrine Development at the Army Aviation School for over three months before she was discharged due to the standard retirement age for her rank.

She holds two degrees in physical education: a bachelor's from Cheongju University in 1978 and a master's from Konkuk University in 1986.

== Electoral history ==
Election	Year	Province	Party affiliation	Votes	Percentage of votes	Results
18th National Assembly General Election	2008	Proportional representation	New Progressive Party	504,466	2.94%	Lost

== Published works ==
Pi's biography Female Soldiers Do Not Like Chocolates (2006)
