= Battle of the Noris =

1952 battle of the Korean War

Coordinates: 38.146°N 126.96°E

- Part of the Korean War
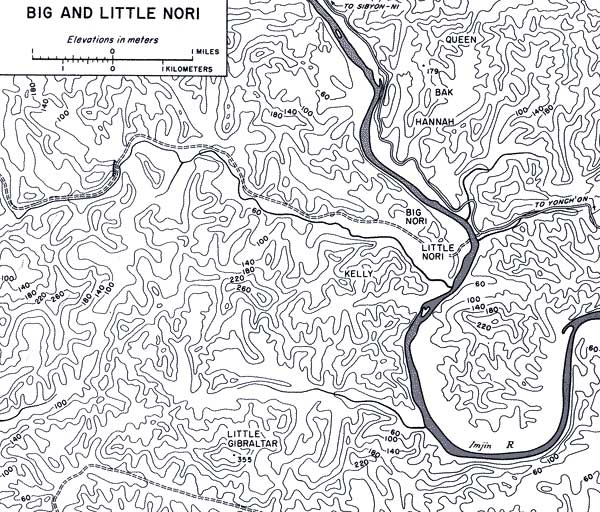
- Map of Big and Little Nori
Date	11–14 December 1952
Location	Northwest of Cheorwon, Korea
Result	Inconclusive

Belligerents
United Nations: South Korea	China

Units involved
(First Republic of Korea) 1st Infantry Division	140th Division

Casualties and losses
750 casualties (237 killed)	UN estimate: 2,000–2,290 casualties

The Battle of the Noris was fought between 11 and 14 December 1952 during the Korean War between South Korean and Chinese forces on two adjacent hills known as Big Nori and Little Nori.

== Background ==
In early December 1952 the Republic of Korea Army (ROK) 1st Infantry Division occupied defensive positions on the double horseshoe bend of the Imjin River. On the west bank of the river, as it began its first horseshoe turn, lay a low hill complex known as Nori; Big Nori formed the western half of the ridge and Little Nori the eastern half. The ROK 15th Regiment maintained outposts on these hills and also on Hill Betty, about 0.75 miles (1.21 km) south of Little Nori, and on Hill 105, approximately 1 mile (1.6 km) southwest of Little Nori. The Chinese People's Volunteer Army (PVA) controlled outposts on the terrain to the north and west of Nori, but had remained fairly inactive in that sector in early December.

== Battle ==
On 11 December two battalions of the 420th Regiment, 140th Division, 47th Army, closely followed 800 rounds of artillery and mortar fire in an attack upon the ROK outposts on Little Nori, Betty, and Hill 105. The main weight fell on Little Nori as two PVA companies sought to dislodge the men of the ROK 15th Infantry. After a bitter 3-hour exchange at close range, the ROK defenders were ordered to pull back to Hill 69, 300 yards (270 m) to the east of Little Nori. After regrouping, the ROK 15th launched two counterattacks, but the two platoons committed failed to drive the PVA off the heights. The PVA waited until the attack forces neared their defensive positions, then hurled hand grenades and loosed a withering artillery, mortar, and small arms fire. Later in the morning, however, a small force from the ROK 11th Regiment, which had relieved the 15th Regiment, reoccupied Little Nori without opposition. In the meantime, the ROK units on Betty had held, but those on Hill 105 had to fall back temporarily. Evidently the PVA movement against Hill 105 was only a diversion, for they left shortly thereafter and the ROK forces reoccupied the positions without incident.

On the night of the 11th, the PVA first launched a two-company drive against Little Nori, then increased the attacking force to a battalion, and the ROK again withdrew to Hill 69. Air support was called in and six B-26's dropped over one hundred 260-pound fragmentary bombs on the hill. Twelve battalions of artillery poured a continuous hail of shells on the PVA, but four counterattacks by the ROK 11th Regiment on 12 December failed. Despite the punishment administered by large and small arms and the mounting toll of losses, the PVA held the hill.

The artillery concentrations went on during the night of 12-13 December and when morning arrived, a battalion from the ROK 11th Regiment moved in with two companies in the attack. Fighting steadily forward, they won their way back to Little Nori, but met with little success in their efforts to clear Big Nori. On the evening of the 13th, the ROK dug in and awaited the expected PVA counterattacks. Two PVA companies vainly attempted to penetrate the ROK positions during the night and as the morning of 14 December dawned, the contest resolved itself into a stalemate.

== Aftermath ==
The entire action on Big and Little Nori took place in an area 300 yards (270 m) wide and 200 yards (180 m) deep. During the engagement the UN artillery fired 120,000 rounds, and the mortar crews over 31,000 while tanks added over 4,500 90mm shells. Supporting aircraft flew 39 missions of 177 sorties to bomb and strafe the PVA positions with Napalm, high explosives, and rockets. In return the ROK received over 18,000 rounds of mixed artillery and mortar fire from PVA guns.

The ROK suffered about 750 casualties including 237 dead, while the estimated total for the PVA ranged between 2,000 and 2,290. According to a deserter from the Chinese 420th Regiment in January, the regiment was removed from the line because of the heavy casualties it took in the battle and placed in reserve.

Action in the Nori sector settled down to patrols and raids during January 1953. The PVA dispatched two platoon-sized probes during the month and on 23 January the ROK 11th Regiment sent a three-platoon raiding party against Big Nori. Air strikes, artillery, and mortar fire, and fire from twelve supporting tanks enabled the raiders to gain the crest, destroy PVA bunkers and then withdraw safely.
