= Ministry of Patriots and Veterans Affairs =

Government ministry of South Korea

- 국가보훈부

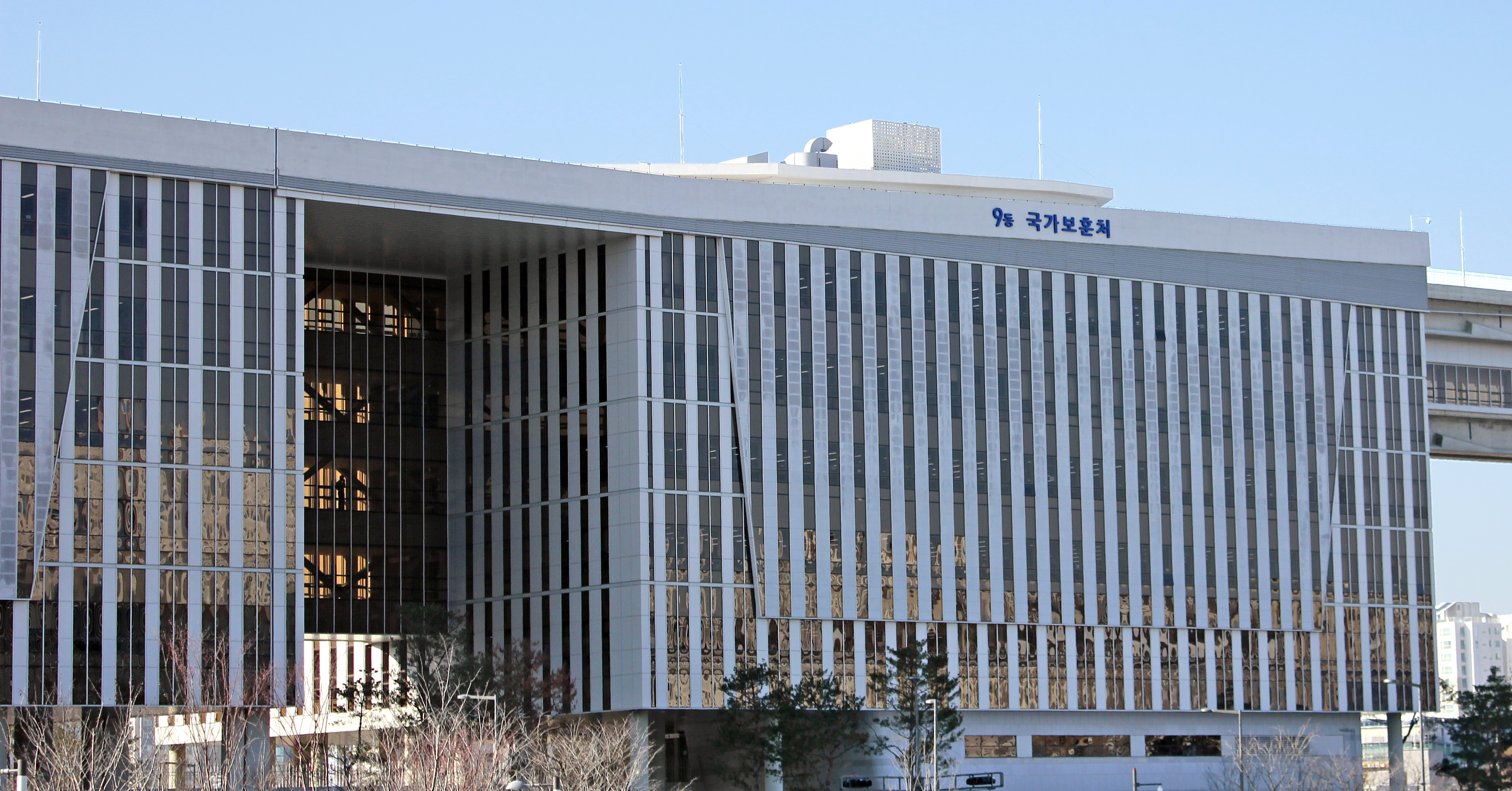
- MPVA headquarters in Sejong

Agency overview
- Formed: 5 June 2023; 2 years ago
- Preceding agencies: Veterans Affairs Agency (1961-1984); Ministry of Patriots and Veterans Affairs (non-State Council member ministry) (1985-2023)
- Jurisdiction: Government of South Korea
- Headquarters: Sejong City
- Minister responsible: Kwon Oh-eul
- Deputy Minister responsible: Lee Hee-wan, deputy secretary
- Website: www.mpva.go.kr

Korean name
- Hangul: 국가보훈부
- Hanja: 國家報勳部
- RR: Gukga bohunbu
- MR: Kukka pohunbu

The Ministry of Patriots and Veterans Affairs (MPVA; Korean: 국가보훈부) is a ministry under the Government of South Korea which manages affairs relating to veterans. It was established in August 1961 as the Veterans Affairs Agency.

== List of ministers ==
List of ministers
No.	Minister	Period
1st	Min Byong-kwon	6 July 1961 – 31 January 1963
2nd	Yoon Young-mo	1 February 1963 - 10 May 1964
3rd	Kim Byung-sam	11 May 1964 – 15 May 1965
4th	Park Ki-suk	16 May 1965 – 21 December 1970
5th	Chang Dong-won	22 December 1970 – 18 October 1973
6th	Yoo Kun-chang	19 October 1973 – 20 December 1977
7th	Kim Jae-myong	21 December 1977 – 22 May 1980
8th	Lee Jong-ho	23 May 1980 – 15 October 1983
9th	Cho Chul-kwon	16 October 1983 – 18 February 1985
10th	Choi Jong-ho	19 February 1985 – 7 January 1986
11th	Kim Keun-soo	8 January 1986 – 24 February 1988
12th	Jun Suk-hong	25 February 1988 – 5 December 1988
13th	Lee Sang-yeon	6 December 1988 – 26 December 1990
14th	Min Gyung-bae	27 December 1990 – 25 February 1993
15th	Rhee Byoung-tae	26 February 1993 – 21 December 1993
16th	Lee Chung-kil	22 December 1993 – 23 December 1994
17th	Hwang Chang-pyeong	24 December 1994 – 19 December 1996
18th	Oh Jung-so	20 December 1996 – 5 March 1997
19th	Park Sang-bum	6 March 1997 – 3 March 1998
20th	Kim Eui-jae	9 March 1998 – 2 March 1999
21st	Choi Kyu-hak	6 March 1999 – 28 August 2000
22nd	Kim Yoo-bae	29 August 2000 – 1 April 2001
23rd	Lee Jae-dal	2 April 2001 – 2 March 2003
24th	An Joo-seob	3 March 2003 – 23 September 2004
25th	Park Yu-chul	24 September 2004 – 19 April 2007
26th	Kim Jung-bok	20 April 2007 – 28 February 2008
27th	Kim Yang	3 March 2009 – 23 February 2011
28th	Park sung-choon	24 February 2011 – 11 May 2017
29th	Pi Woo-jin	17 May 2017 – 15 August 2019
30th	Park Sam-duk	16 August 2019 – 30 December 2020
31st	Hwang Ki-chul	31 December 2020 – 12 May 2022
32nd	Park Min-shik	12 May 2022 – 26 December 2023
33nd	Kang Jung-ai	26 December 2023 - incumbent

== Timeline ==
- 5 July 1961 – Act for Establishment of Military Relief Administration enacted
- 12 May 1962 – Veterans Office Military Relief Office was renamed to Veterans Office, and branch office became regional offices, and 25 local agencies were upgraded to district offices
- 1 January 1985 – Veterans Affairs Agency became Ministry of Patriots and Veterans Affairs, regional offices became regional veterans offices or branch veterans offices, and Veterans Committee 4.19 Cemetery Management Office was created
- 19 February 1993 – The posts of Director-Generals of Veterans Policy and Veterans Promotion were created
- 28 January 1995 – 4.19 Cemetery Management Office was created
- 14 September 2002 – City-administered 5.18 cemetery Office and 3.15 cemetery Office were transferred to MPVA and two cemeteries’ level was elevated to national cemetery from municipal cemetery
- 24 May 2004 – The Veterans Bureau was newly established to help veterans make a smoother transition to civilian life
- 18 May 2005 – The Independence Hall was transferred to MPVA from Ministry of Culture, Sports and Tourism
- 26 January 2006 – The Daejeon National Cemetery was transferred to MPVA from Ministry of Defense
- 14 January 2007 – Veterans Centers in Seoul, Busan, Daejeon were created
- 7 July 2011 – Veterans Center in Gyeonggi Province was created
- 28 July 2017 – The status of the MPVA Minister was elevated from vice-ministerial to ministerial level
- 5 June 2023 – The status of the MPVA Minister was elevated to a full member of State Council of the Republic of Korea from its attendee. The MPVA's Korean name is changed to 국가보훈부 from 국가보훈처.

== Logos ==
Logo used between 2001-2016

Logo used between 2016-2023

Current logo

== See also ==
- Ministries of South Korea
