= Cornelius E. Ryan =

U.S. Army Major General (1896–1972)

Cornelius Edward Ryan
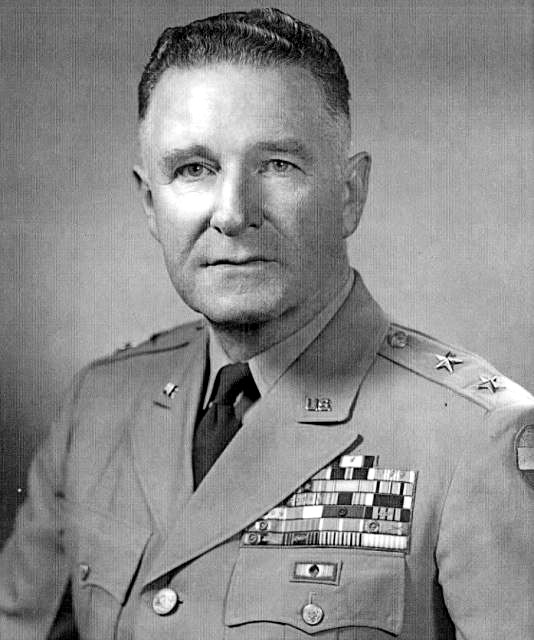
- MG Cornelius E. Ryan
- Born: May 12, 1896; Boston, Massachusetts, US
- Died: June 6, 1972 (aged 76); Menlo Park, California, US
- Military career
- Allegiance: United States
- Branch: United States Army
- Service years: 1917–1957
- Rank: Major general
- Service number: 0-7375
- Unit: Infantry Branch
- Commands: 9th Infantry Division; 69th Infantry Division; Korean Military Advisory Group; 101st Airborne Division; Berlin Sector
- Conflicts: World War I World War II: Battle of Normandy; Battle of the Bulge; Rhineland Campaign; Western Allied invasion of Germany; Korean War: Operation Rat Killer
- Awards: Distinguished Service Medal (2); Legion of Merit; Bronze Star Medal; Army Commendation Medal (4)

Cornelius Edward Ryan CBE (May 12, 1896 – June 6, 1972) was a highly decorated officer in the United States Army with the rank of major general. During his 40 years of active service, he participated in both World Wars and Korean War and held several important assignments including commands of 101st Airborne Division, Berlin Occupation Sector or as Chief of Korean Military Advisory Group.

== Early career ==
Cornelius E. Ryan was born on May 12, 1896, in Boston, Massachusetts, the son of Thomas B. Ryan and Julia B. Driscoll. Following high school, he entered the University of Connecticut in Storrs, Connecticut, where he was active in football and basketball squads and reached the rank of first sergeant in the Reserve Officers' Training Corps.

Ryan graduated with Bachelor of Science degree in summer 1917 and was commissioned second lieutenant in the Infantry Branch on August 15, 1917. He was then assigned to the 49th Infantry Regiment at Syracuse, New York and spent several next months with intensive training for combat deployment in France. His regiment was later attached to the 83rd Division and embarked for France in July 1918, where it was stationed in the rear area, providing replacement personnel for front-line units. While in France, Ryan participated in the training of Polish legions and returned to the United States in early 1919.

He remained with 49th Infantry at Fort Snelling, Minnesota until May 1921, when he was transferred to 34th Infantry Regiment at Camp Meade, Maryland. After one year there, he was sent to Fort Benning, Georgia, where he assumed duty as assistant to the post logistics officer. Ryan spent three months in this capacity and entered the Company Officers' Course at local Army Infantry School in September 1922.

Following the graduation in June 1923, he returned to Camp Meade, where he completed the Tank School. Ryan was then sent to Cambridge, Massachusetts for a one-year course at Massachusetts Institute of Technology.

In August 1927, Ryan was ordered to Versailles, France, where he was detailed to the Centre D'Études des Chars de Combat (The Center for Combat Tank Studies a.k.a. Tank School). He graduated a few months later and joined the 507th French Tank Regiment in Metz, where he served as observer for two months and then returned to the United States.

Ryan was sent to the University of California, Berkeley in early 1930 and assumed duty as assistant professor of military science & tactics. He spent six years in this capacity and subsequently joined 23rd Infantry Regiment at Fort Sam Houston, Texas. Ryan remained there until September 1938, when he entered the course at the Army Command and General Staff School at Fort Leavenworth, Kansas.

Upon the graduation as major in June 1939, Ryan was appointed an instructor in the Tank section at the Army Infantry School at Fort Benning, Georgia. He served consecutively under Brigadier generals Asa L. Singleton, Courtney Hodges, Omar Bradley and Leven C. Allen and was appointed Chief of the Automotive Section. While in this capacity, he was promoted to lieutenant colonel in August 1940 and to the temporary rank of colonel on December 24, 1941.

== World War II ==
During the first years of the United States participation in the World War II, Ryan participated in the training of Army officers with his automotive section until February 1943, when his services were requested by his old superior, Lieutenant General Courtney Hodges, now commanding general of Third United States Army at Fort Sam Houston, Texas. The Third Army was tasked with the training of replacements, and Ryan as its assistant chief of staff for operations, had the opportunity to proved again his skills during the planning of training. For his service at Army Infantry School and with Third Army, Ryan was decorated with two Army Commendation Medals.

In June 1943, he was sent to the European Theater of Operations, when he was requested by his another old superior from Infantry School, General Omar Bradley. Ryan was attached to the headquarters, Twelfth United States Army Group as assistant chief of staff for military plans and training. He served in this capacity during the Battle of Normandy, Ardennes Campaign, Rhineland Campaign and Western Allied invasion of Germany and was promoted to the temporary rank of brigadier general on January 7, 1945.

For his service in this capacity, Ryan was decorated with Distinguished Service Medal, Legion of Merit and Bronze Star Medal. His service was also recognized by the Allies and he was decorated with: Order of the British Empire; Legion of Honour and Croix de Guerre with Palm by France; Order of Adolphe of Nassau and War Cross by Luxembourg; Order of Leopold II and Croix de Guerre with Palm by Belgium; Order of Orange-Nassau by the Netherlands; and War Cross by Czechoslovakia.

== Postwar period ==
In August 1945, three months after the surrender of Nazi Germany, Ryan was transferred to the headquarters, Fifteenth United States Army under General Leonard T. Gerow. He served under him and later under General George S. Patton as assistant chief of staff for military plans and training during the occupation of Germany in North Rhine-Westphalia, the Rhineland-Palatinate and Saarland.

Ryan was ordered to Berlin in May 1946 and assumed duty as deputy commanding general, Berlin Sector under Major General Frank A. Keating. He remained in that capacity until October that year, when he was ordered to Frankfurt am Main for duty as commanding general, General Headquarters, U.S. Forces, European Theater.

He was transferred back to Berlin in May 1947 and assumed duty as commanding general, Berlin Sector with additional duty as deputy military governor and U.S. Representative on the Berlin Allied Kommandatura. While in this capacity, he was co-responsible for the governing of the city of Berlin, which was divided in four sectors occupied by Great Britain, France, United States and Soviet Union and took part in the regular meetings despite the worsening political situation. For his service in postwar Germany, Ryan received his third Army Commendation Medal.

Ryan returned to the United States in September 1947 after 51 months of overseas duty and assumed duty as chief of staff, V Corps under Major General Stafford LeRoy Irwin at Fort Bragg, North Carolina. He was ordered to Camp Breckinridge, Kentucky in October 1948 and assumed duty as assistant division commander, 101st Airborne Division under Major General William R. Schmidt.

== Korean War ==
Ryan participated in the training of airborne units and ultimately relieved Schmidt as division commander in August 1950. He continued to train replacement airborne personnel for combat units in Korea until May 1951 and received his fourth Army Commendation Medal based on the letter from the U.S. Army Assistant Chief of Operations, Lieutenant General Maxwell D. Taylor.

He gained the reputation of great troops trainer and got the attention of commanding general, Second United States Army, James Van Fleet, under which 101st Airborne Division fell under. Van Fleet was meanwhile ordered to Korea to command the United States Eighth Army and did not forget Ryan's qualities. Van Fleet was not fully satisfied with the progress of Korean Military Advisory Group under Brigadier General Francis W. Farrell and asked War Department for Ryan as Farrell's replacement.

Ryan was ordered to Korea and assumed duty as Chief, Korean Military Advisory Group (KMAG) on July 7, 1951. His main task was to transform the Republic of Korea Army (ROKA) into a fighting force capable of carrying its weight in United States Eighth Army and make Korean Military Advisory Group responsive to the needs of the Republic of Korea Army. He developed strong relation with his counterparts, generals Lee Chong-chan and Paik Sun-yup and worked together on plans to make a new army.

He visited frontline areas on daily basis with South Korean counterpart and toured the battle lines, training centers, and other installations to evaluate personally the effect of KMAG's programs on ROKA units in the field. Ryan supervised all aspects of ROKA military organization and administration, from the induction and training of soldiers, to the formation and equipping of new units, to their employment on the battlefield. He restarted the pre-war program of sending Koreans to the United States for basic and advance infantry and artillery training. Ryan also closely monitored Operation Rat Killer led by ROKA command.

When Ryan arrived in Korea, KMAG had 920 officers and men assigned to it and by September 1951, Ryan supervised 1,308 advisors. He later increased the number of KMAG advisors to the total strength of 1,812 personnel by January 1952. Altogether, 499,751 trainees passed through the KMAG Replacement Training Center system from July 1950 through August 1953.

Under his leadership, KMAG transformed into a first-class military training and advisory mission. Under his experienced direction, KMAG then inaugurated a series of training and organizational reforms that laid the basis for a Korean Army capable of fighting the Chinese on more equal terms. Ryan served in Korea until mid-May 1953, when he was succeeded by Brigadier General Gordon B. Rogers. For his service with KMAG, Ryan was decorated with his second Army Distinguished Service Medal and also received Order of Military Merit (South Korea) Ulchi with gold star and Order of Military Merit (South Korea) Taiguk with silver star by the Republic of Korea. He was promoted to major general in November 1952.

== Later service ==
Following his return stateside and two-month leave, Ryan was ordered to Fort Dix, New Jersey, where he assumed command of 9th Infantry Division with additional command of that installation. His new command was responsible for the training of replacements for troops both in Europe and Korea. The 9th Infantry Division was stationed at Fort Dix until May 1954, where it was transferred to Fort Carson, Colorado and replaced by newly activated 69th Infantry Division.

Ryan assumed command of 69th Infantry Division in May 1954 and was again responsible for the training of replacements until November 1955, when he was ordered to Paris, France for duty as Chief of the Military Assistance Advisory Group there. He served in that capacity until June 1957, when he retired after almost 40 years of active duty. The Government of France upgraded his Legion of Honour from Officer grade to Commander for his service in Paris.

== Retirement and death ==
Ryan's retirement did not last long, and he was offered the full-time job of executive vice chairman of the Presidents Committee on Governments Contracts by President Dwight D. Eisenhower in October 1957. While in this capacity, he was responsible for eliminating employment discrimination on government contracts. Ryan visited a number of CEOs of important federal contractors, including Alcoa, General Electric and Bethlehem Steel.

He later settled in Menlo Park, California, where he died at the Veterans Administration Hospital after long illness on June 6, 1972, aged 76. He was buried with full military honors at Arlington National Cemetery, Virginia together with his wife, Inez B. Ryan. They had two sons, both West Point graduates, Major Walter Joseph Ryan and Captain Edward F. Ryan, and one daughter Elizabeth.

== Decorations ==
Here is Major General Ryan's ribbon bar:

1st Row	Army Distinguished Service Medal with Oak Leaf Cluster			
2nd Row	Legion of Merit	Bronze Star Medal	Army Commendation Medal with three Oak Leaf Clusters	World War I Victory Medal with one Battle Clasp
3rd Row	American Defense Service Medal	American Campaign Medal	European-African-Middle Eastern Campaign Medal with five 3/16 inch service stars	World War II Victory Medal
4th Row	Army of Occupation Medal	Korean Service Medal with five 3/16 inch service stars	National Defense Service Medal	Polish Cross for American Volunteers
5th Row	Commander of the Legion of Honor (France)	French Croix de guerre 1939-1945 with Palm	Commander of the Most Excellent Order of the British Empire	Commander of the Order of Adolphe of Nassau (Luxembourg)
6th Row	Luxembourg War Cross	Commander of the Order of Leopold II (Belgium)	Belgian Croix de Guerre with Palm	Commander of the Order of Orange-Nassau (the Netherlands)
7th Row	Czechoslovak War Cross 1939–1945	Korean Order of Military Merit Ulchi with Gold star	Korean Order of Military Merit Taiguk with Silver star	United Nations Korea Medal

== See also ==
- Korean Military Advisory Group

Military offices
Preceded by Homer W. Kiefer	Commanding General 9th Infantry Division; July 1953 – May 1954	Succeeded by Donald P. Booth
Preceded by Francis W. Farrell	Chief, Korean Military Advisory Group; July 7, 1951 – May 14, 1953	Succeeded by Gordon B. Rogers
Preceded by William R. Schmidt	Commanding General 101st Airborne Division; August 1950 – May 1951	Succeeded by Ray E. Porter
