= Kentucky Route 1245 =

State highway in Ohio County, Kentucky, United States

Kentucky Route 1245
- KY 1245 highlighted in red

Route information
- Maintained by KYTC
- Length: 6.685 mi (10.758 km)

Major junctions
- North end: US 62 in McHenry
- South end: US 62 in Rockport

Location
- Country: United States
- State: Kentucky
- Counties: Ohio

Highway system
- Kentucky State Highway System; Interstate; US; State; Parkways
← KY 1244	→ KY 1246

Kentucky Route 1245 (KY 1245) is a 6.685-mile-long (10.758 km) state highway in Ohio County that begins at U.S. Route 62 (US 62) in Rockport and heads to Echols, where it meets the eastern terminus of KY 2719 (Echols Church Lane). It then turns from Pond Run Church Road (Old Junction of KY 176). Also, where it was over the Western Kentucky Parkway heading to the western part of Nineteen School Road (County road 1263, CR 1263). The highway again goes over the Western Kentucky Parkway and meets the northern terminus of KY 2720 (Happy Hollow Road). Heading up north, it enters the town of McHenry, where it ends at US 62 and KY 2670.

== Major intersections ==
The entire route is in Ohio County.

Location	mi	km	Destinations	Notes
Rockport	0.000	0.000	US 62 (Main Street)	Southern terminus
Echols	1.496	2.408	KY 2719 west (Echols Church Lane)	Eastern terminus of KY 2719
	4.258	6.853	KY 2720 south (Happy Hollow Road)	Northern terminus of KY 2720
McHenry	6.652	10.705	KY 2670 north (Highland Drive)	Southern terminus of KY 2670
McHenry	6.685	10.758	US 62	Northern terminus
1.000 mi = 1.609 km; 1.000 km = 0.621 mi
