= Halley G. Maddox =

United States Army general (1899–1977)

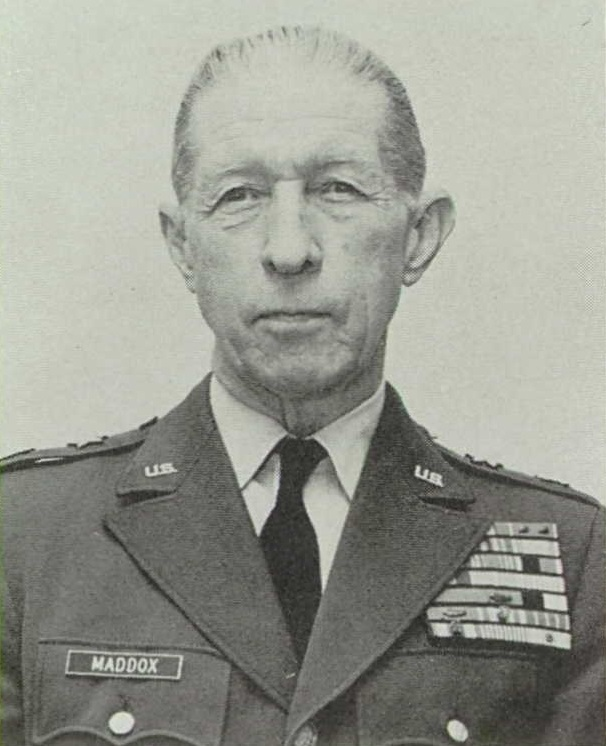
- From the 1963 edition of The Crest, the yearbook of San Marcos Baptist Academy
- Born: January 29, 1899; McHenry, Kentucky, US
- Died: May 26, 1977 (aged 78); San Marcos, Texas, US
- Burial place: Saint Stephen's Episcopal Church Cemetery, Wimberley, Texas, US
- Spouse(s): Bertalee Bernard Roemer (m. 1922, div. c. 1946); Madeleine (Ehrheart) Chace (m. 1949–1977, his death)
- Military career
- Allegiance: United States
- Branch: United States Army
- Service years: 1920–1959
- Rank: Major General
- Unit: U.S. Army Cavalry Branch
- Commands: Troop A, 1st Reconnaissance Squadron; 2nd Battalion, 32nd Armored Regiment; Fort Gordon, Georgia; 25th Infantry Division; I Corps; Korean Military Advisory Group; 9th Infantry Division; VII Corps
- Conflicts: World War II; Korean War
- Awards: Army Distinguished Service Medal (2); Legion of Merit (3); Bronze Star Medal (2)
- Other work: Assistant to the President, San Marcos Baptist Academy

Halley Grey Maddox (January 29, 1899 – May 26, 1977) was a career officer in the United States Army. A 1920 graduate of the United States Military Academy, he was originally assigned to the Infantry branch and later transferred to Cavalry. A noted horseman, he took part in numerous equestrian shows as a member of U.S. Army teams and was also a member of numerous Army polo teams during the height of the sport's popularity in the 1920s.

A veteran of World War II, Maddox served as Assistant Chief of Staff for Operations (G-3) on the staff of General George S. Patton during Patton's command of Seventh and Third U.S. Armies during combat in North Africa and Europe. Maddox attained the rank of major general and was notable after World War II for his command of the 25th Infantry Division and Korean Military Advisory Group during the Korean War. He subsequently commanded the 9th Infantry Division and U.S. VII Corps. He later served as chief of staff and deputy commander of United States Army Europe, and his final assignment before retiring in 1959 was deputy commander of Second United States Army.

After retiring from the military, Maddox served as assistant to the president of San Marcos Baptist Academy. He retired from this position in 1967 and was a resident of San Marcos, Texas. He died in there in 1977 and was buried at Saint Stephen's Episcopal Church Cemetery in Wimberley, Texas.

== Early life ==
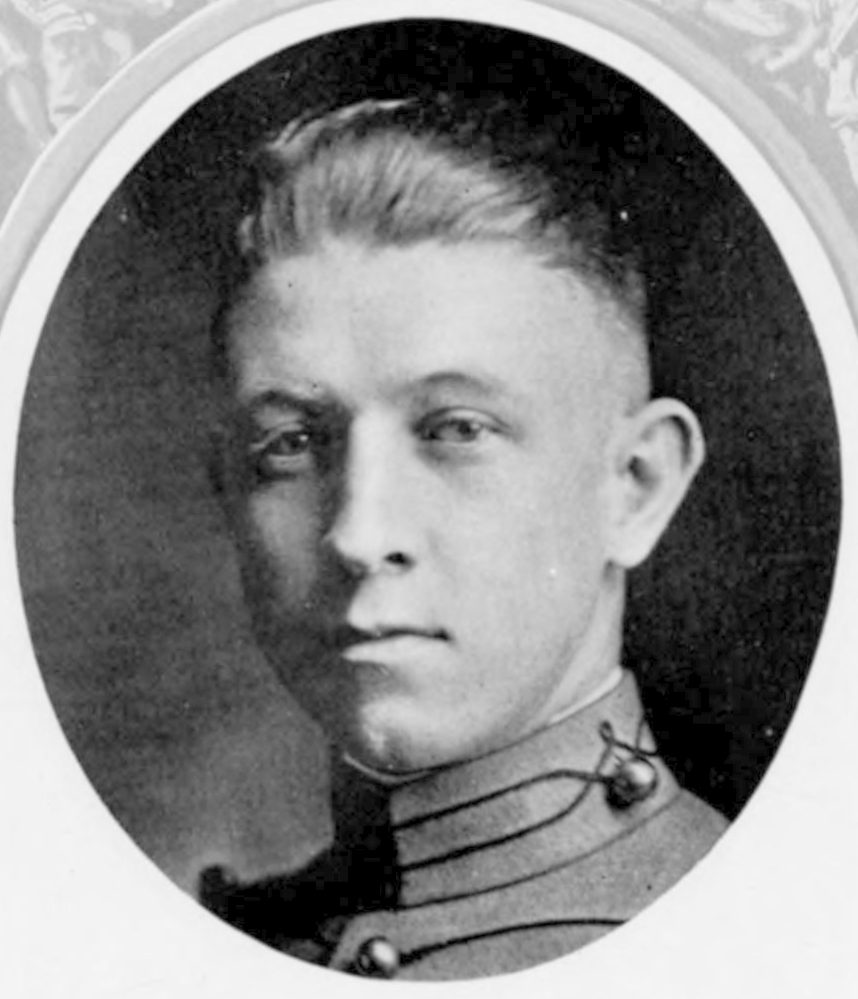
At West Point in 1920

Halley Grey Maddox was born in McHenry, Kentucky on January 29, 1899, a son of Claude H. Maddox and Susan (Stewart) Maddox. He was raised and educated in Central City, Kentucky, and graduated from Hartford College, a two-year institution located in Hartford, Kentucky.

Maddox graduated from Marion Military Institute in 1917, then received appointment to the United States Military Academy from U.S. Representative Robert Y. Thomas Jr. Maddox graduated in 1920, ranked 254 of 271. He was commissioned as a second lieutenant in the Infantry branch.

== Start of career ==
Maddox served initially at Fort Stotsenburg, Philippines and received temporary promotion to first lieutenant in 1920. He then transferred to the Cavalry branch and attended the Cavalry School Basic Course at Fort Riley, Kansas, afterwards remaining at the school to serve as an instructor. He began to develop a reputation as an outstanding horseman, which led to participation in numerous equestrian activities, including the Army Horse Show Team. He also participated on several Army polo teams as the sport's popularity in the Army grew during the 1920s. Next assigned to the 4th Cavalry Regiment, he was posted to Fort Brown, Texas. He was subsequently assigned to the 12th Cavalry, also at Fort Brown. He reverted to his permanent rank of second lieutenant in 1922.

In 1923, he was selected for attendance at the Signal Corps Officers Course. From April 1924 to April 1925, he was a student in the Air Corps Primary Flying School at Brooks Field, Texas. After graduating, he was assigned to the 10th Cavalry Regiment at Fort Huachuca. In December 1925, he received promotion to permanent first lieutenant. In 1928, he was again posted to Fort Stotsenburg, Philippines, this time as a member of the 26th Cavalry. In 1930, he returned to Fort Riley and was assigned to the 2nd Cavalry. Maddox was posted to Fort Riley again in 1933, this time as a student at the Advanced Equitation Course. Assigned to the 9th Cavalry Regiment, he served on the Cavalry School faculty again from 1933 to 1938, and was promoted to captain in 1935. In 1938, he was assigned to the staff of the 1st Cavalry Division at Fort Bliss, Texas.

== World War II ==
In 1940, Maddox was promoted to major, and assigned as commander of Troop A, 1st Reconnaissance Squadron. In 1941 he graduated from the United States Army Command and General Staff College. After graduation, he transferred from the 1st Cavalry Division to the 3rd Armored Division and was assigned to command 2nd Battalion, 32nd Armored Regiment at Fort Polk, Louisiana.

In December 1941, Maddox received promotion to temporary lieutenant colonel, and in June 1942 he was transferred to the General Staff Corps, the contingent of Army officers qualified to serve on staffs at division level and above. He was then assigned as Assistant Chief of Staff (G-3), for 7th Armored Division. His next posting was as assistant chief of staff for operations (G-3) for I Armored Corps, which was commanded by George S. Patton. Maddox served on the corps staff during the unit's initial organization and training.

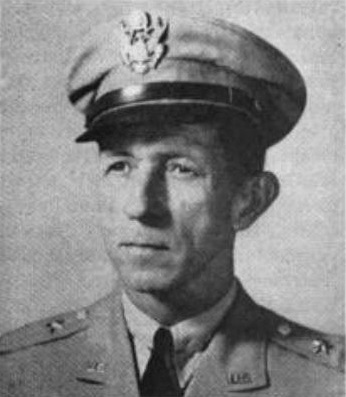
Maddox as a brigadier general in the late 1940s

In September 1942, Maddox was promoted to temporary colonel. He took part in the Operation Torch landings in French North Africa as a member of the operations staff (G-3) for the Western Task Force, again under the command of George Patton. Assigned as G-3 of Seventh Army, again under Patton's command, Maddox took part in planning and executing the Allied invasion of Sicily in the summer of 1943. In July 1943, he was promoted to permanent lieutenant colonel.

When Patton was assigned to command Third United States Army in preparation for the 1944 Normandy landings and invasion of German-occupied France, Maddox was again assigned as Patton's G-3. He planned and oversaw execution of Third Army's operations until the end of the war in 1945, and received promotion to temporary brigadier general in November 1944. Word of Maddox's promotion came while Third Army was involved in combat during the Lorraine campaign; Patton immediately removed one star from each of his shoulder straps and used them to conduct an impromptu ceremony awarding Maddox his new rank.

== Post-World War II ==
After the war, Maddox reverted to the permanent rank of colonel. He served as chief of staff of the United States Constabulary in Germany from 1947 to 1949. He then served again as assistant chief of staff (G-3) for Third U.S. Army, and again received promotion to brigadier general, once more making use of the stars he had received from Patton in 1944. In 1949 he was appointed to command the Fort Gordon, Georgia military post. In 1951 he returned to Third Army, this time as chief of staff. He then served as chief of staff for Army Field Forces at Fort Monroe, Virginia. In September 1952, Maddox received promotion to major general.

== Korean War ==
From August 1953 to May 1954, Maddox commanded the 25th Infantry Division in South Korea. Taking command as the Korean War was nearing resolution, Maddox oversaw the division's preparations to return to its home base in Hawaii for post-war reorganization. In addition, he approved and presented numerous awards and decorations to recognize members of the division for their service and heroism in combat. During the fall of 1953, Maddox also served as interim commander of I Corps, following the departure of Bruce C. Clarke and prior to the arrival of Blackshear M. Bryan.

From June to November 1954, Maddox commanded the Korean Military Advisory Group (KMAG). In this position, he commanded 3,000 soldiers who were assigned to advise and assist the military of South Korea as it rebuilt and reorganized following the end of the war.

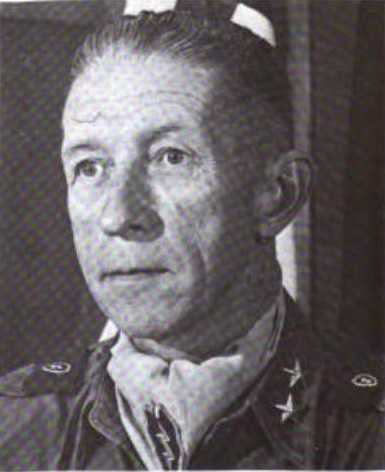
Maddox as commander of the 25th Infantry Division in 1953

== Post-Korean War ==
In November 1954, Maddox was assigned as commander of the 9th Infantry Division, which was stationed in West Germany. During his command, which took place as the Cold War was ongoing, the division took part in training and exercises intended to deter the Union of Soviet Socialist Republics from invading Western Europe. From June to July 1956, he was interim commander of VII Corps.

After his brief corps command, Maddox was assigned as chief of staff for United States Army Europe. In July 1957, he was named deputy commander of U.S. Army Europe. In March 1958, Maddox was appointed deputy commander of United States Second Army at Fort Meade, Maryland, where he remained until retiring in January 1959.

== Later life ==
In 1961, Maddox agreed to become assistant to the president of San Marcos Baptist Academy in San Marcos, Texas. Among his efforts to provide military training to the school's cadets was the creation of an annual drill and ceremony competition, which included participants from numerous high schools and military academies. Maddox remained on the academy staff until retiring in 1967.

Maddox was also active in veterans and military retiree organizations in the San Marcos area, including participating in events to raise money for charity during Armed Forces Day celebrations. With the release of the film Patton in 1970, members of the news media asked to interview him. After screening the film, Maddox provided reporters with his impressions of the movie, which were generally favorable, and his recollections of his World War II service under Patton's command.

== Death and burial ==
Maddox died in San Antonio, Texas on May 26, 1977. He was buried at Saint Stephen's Episcopal Church Cemetery in Wimberley, Texas.

== Awards ==
Maddox's awards included the Army Distinguished Service Medal with oak leaf cluster, Legion of Merit with two oak leaf clusters, and Bronze Star Medal with oak leaf cluster. His foreigh awards and decorations included: the French Legion of Honor, Croix de Guerre with Palm and Medal of Metz; the Soviet Order of the Patriotic War First Class; the Czechoslovak War Cross and Order of the White Lion; the Order of Merit of the Grand Duchy of Luxembourg and Luxembourg War Cross with Palm and South Korea's Order of Military Merit (Taeguk).

== Family ==
In 1922, Maddox married Bertalee Bernard Roemer (1892–1975), who had previously been married to Theodore M. Roemer. She was the mother of a daughter, Jean (b. 1920). They divorced after World War II, and in December 1949 Maddox married Madeleine (Ehrheart) Chace (1907–2006). She was the mother of two daughters, Madeleine and Sara.
