= Kang Jae-gu =

Korean military officer (1937-1965)

Army major

Personal details
- Born: July 26, 1937 Geumgok-dong, Dong-gu, Incheon, South Korea
- Died: October 4, 1965 Seongdong-ri, Bukbang-myeon Hongcheon-gun Gangwon Province Korea
- Spouse: On Young-soon
- Children: Kang Byung-hoon (son)
- Education: Korea Military Academy
- Awards: Order of Taegeug Military Merit

Military service
- Allegiance: South Korea
- Branch/service: Republic of Korea Army
- Years of service: 1960-1965
- Rank: Major
- Commands: 10th lieutenant of the 1st Regiment of the Capital Mechanized Infantry Division

Korean name
- Hangul: 강재구
- Hanja: 姜在求
- RR: Gang Jaegu
- MR: Kang Chaegu

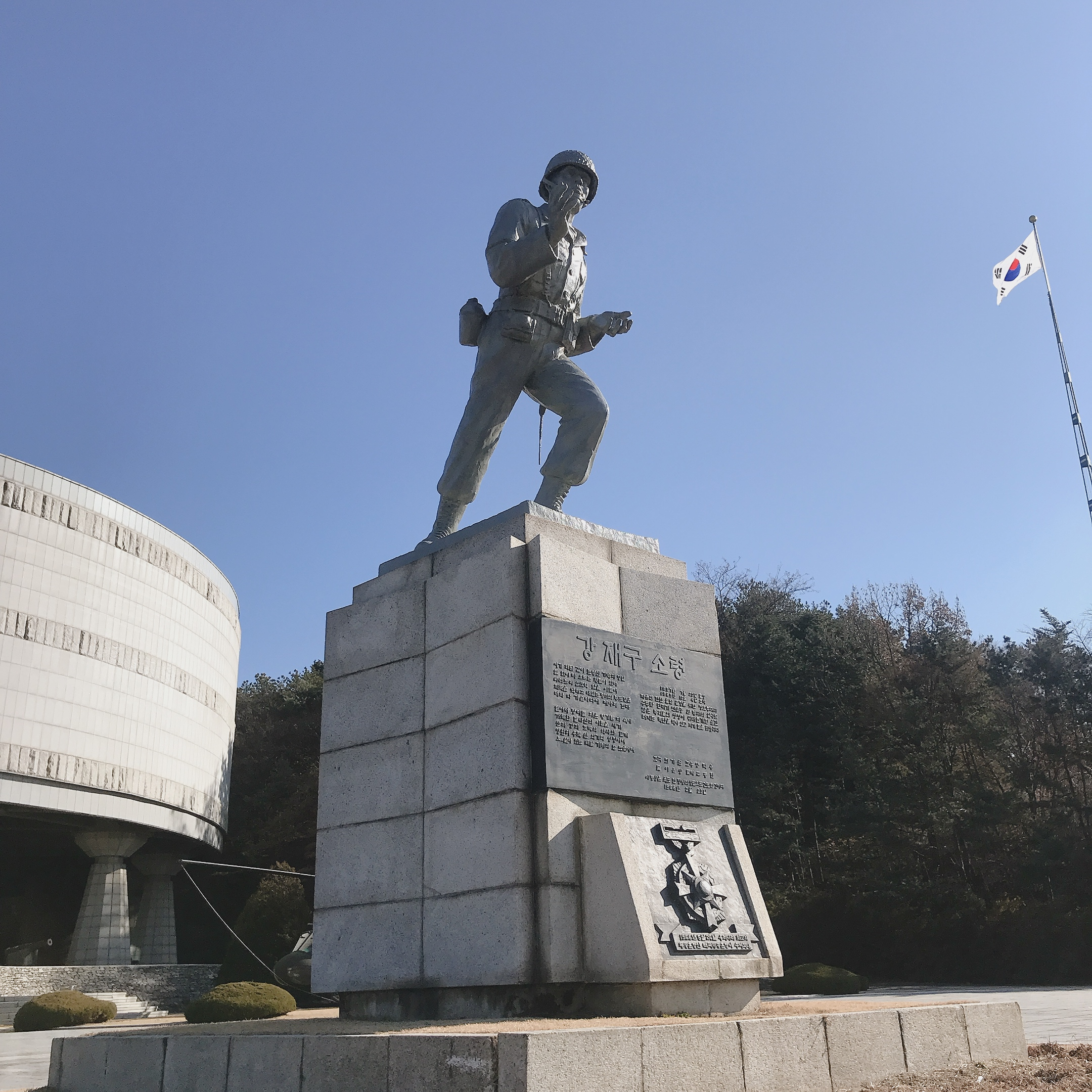
Statue of Major Kang

Kang Jae-gu (Korean: 강재구; 26 July 1937 – 4 October 1965) was born in Incheon in 1937, graduated from Seoul High School, and then graduated from the 16th class of Korea Military Academy in March 1960. In 1965, he sacrificed himself by throwing himself onto a grenade dropped by a soldier. His rank during his lifetime was captain, and after his death he was ordered to be a major after an army funeral was held.

At the Korea Military Academy, the official name of the 2nd Company, which he belonged to as a cadet, is designated as "Jae-gu 2nd Company" to commemorate it.

== Military career ==
- 1960 - Graduated from the 16th class of Korea Military Academy, and was appointed to as Army Lieutenant. He later served as a platoon commander of the 1st Regiment of the Capital Division and as a grenade instructor at the 1st Non-commissioned officer School.
- 1965 - On August 29, he was appointed as the 10th lieutenant of the 1st Regiment of the Capital Mechanized Infantry Division (a.k.a.'Maengho' - fierce tiger) as the dispatch of a Korea military division to Vietnam was decided.
- 4 October 1965 - While preparing for dispatch training, Kang Jae-gu covered a grenade with his body and sacrificed himself to save his men from a grenade accidentally dropped by a subordinate.
- 8 October 1965 - An Army funeral was held.
- 23 February 1966 - A statue called "Jae-gu sang " is erected.
- May 1966 - He was awarded the Taegeuk Order of Military Merit.

== Sacrifice ==
On October 4, 1965, the 10th Company, with Kang Jae-gu as the company commander, was carrying out a grenade throwing drill while preparing to dispatch troops to Vietnam.

At this time, Private Park Hae-cheon pulled out the safety pin and leaned his hand back to throw the grenade, the moment he was so nervous that he dropped the grenade from his hand.

The grenade fell to the place where the company members were gathered, and Captain Kang Jae-gu, who was supervising the training of the grenade at the time, sensed the crisis and covered the grenade with his body, saving and sacrificing the lives of numerous subordinates.

Only five people around him were injured as Kang Jae-gu's Spirit of sacrifice, and all the rest of the men were able to save their lives.

His leadership style and attention to subordinate welfare were cited as a model for soldiers in Vietnam and the wider military.

In honor of his merit, the government held a memorial service as an army funeral, was promoted to the first rank as major, and ordered Taegeuk Order of Military Merit in praise of the military spirit of Major Jae-gu Kang.

There is a statue of Major Jae-gu Kang at the Korea Military Academy, and since 1966, the "Jae-gu Ceremony" has been held to commemorate his military spirit and spirit of sacrifice.

== Kang Jae-gu Statue ==
In the Korea Military Academy, there is a statue of Major Jae-gu Kang, which was erected with donations from soldiers in the army.

In order to commemorate Major Jae-gu Kang as a symbol of true military spirit, "Jae-gu Ceremony" is held during the "Hwarang Basic Training".

The statue of Major General Kang Jae-gu is registered as 'Ministry of Patriots and Veterans Affairs Designated Rehabilitation Facility Management Number 11-2-11'.

The following text is inscribed in Korean on the statue of Major Jae-gu Kang.

「여기 해달 같이 눈부신 기백과 정열

끝 없이 타오르는 횃불이 있다.

바라보라 삼군의 앞을 이끌어

자축을 박차고 내닫는 정의의 부르짖음

너와 나 가슴마다에 메아리 친다.

뿜어서 장미를 피운 향기론 피 속에

거룩한 불사신의 이름을 새겨

산과 강과 조국의 역사와 함께 영원히 우뚝 선 의기의 상징이여

오, 살아 있는 배달 겨레의 참 모습이여

자유의 전선 월남 출정을 위한 맹호부대의

수류탄 던지기 연습중 한 부하의 실수로

많은 부하들의 생명이 위태롭게된 순간

터지는 폭탄을 막아 안고 자기 몸을 희생하다.」

The above is a phrase written on the statue of Major Jae-gu Kang, written to commemorate and commemorate him.

In order to commemorate the soul of Major Jae-gu Kang, who was the second company during the cadet period, the Korea Military Academy is calling the second company as a '재구가'.

'재구가' is also called 'a burning torch'.

The lyrics of the '재구가' are as follows.

「1절 해달같이 눈부신 기백과 정열

끝없이 타오르는 횃불을 보라

동지들을 구하려고 제몸 던졌네

저님은 살아있는 의기의 상징

내 나라 내 겨레 위해서라면

재구처럼 이 목숨 아끼잖으리

2절 장미같이 향기론 피를 품어서

거룩한 불사신의 이름 새겼네

지축을 흔드는 정의의 외침

너와 나 가슴마다 메아리친다

내 나라 내 겨레 위해서라면

재구처럼 이 목숨 아끼잖으리」
