= William Hamilton Shaw =

William Hamilton Shaw (Korean name: 서위렴, 5 June 1922 – 22 September 1950) was a United States Navy officer who served in World War II and the Korean War.

== Early life ==
On 5 June 1922, Shaw was born in Pyongyang, Korea.

His parents, William Earl Shaw and Adeline Hamilton Shaw were Christian missionaries with the Methodist Church.

== Career ==
During World War II, he served in the European theater as a PT Boat executive officer, especially he was involved in Normandy landings.

After release from active duty in August 1946, Shaw returned to Korea with the U.S. Navy to assist in establishing the Korea Naval Academy at Jinhae-gu, Changwon.

In 1949, Shaw returned to the US and entered the doctoral program in East Asian and Korean studies at Harvard University.

Following the outbreak of the Korean War, Shaw rejoined the Navy and returned to Korea and made the following comment: “I cannot in good conscience return to Korea as a Christian missionary in peacetime if I am not first willing to be there to help the Koreans defend their freedom in time of war,”

He became fluent in the Korean language and geography, and was immediately assigned to the staff of General Douglas MacArthur as a Naval intelligence officer.

Although his naval mission was completed with the successful recapture of Inchon, Shaw volunteered to lead a reconnaissance team behind enemy lines in the push to retake Seoul. On September 22, 1950, Shaw was killed in action by an enemy sniper while leading a reconnaissance team of 5th Marine Regiment, 1st Marine Division as they approached Nokpon-ri over the Han River.

=== Silver Star citation ===
General Orders: Commanding General, 1st Marine Division (Reinforced) FMF: 18196 (December 9, 1950)

The President of the United States of America takes pride in presenting the Silver Star (Posthumously) to Lieutenant William Hamilton Shaw (NSN: 257303), United States Navy, for conspicuous gallantry and intrepidity in action against the enemy while serving as Special Interpreter and Liaison Officer attached to the Fifth Regiment, FIRST Marine Division (Reinforced), in action against enemy aggressor forces in Korea on 22 September 1950. Lieutenant Shaw courageously volunteered to accompany a front line battalion in order to conduct on the spot interrogation of prisoners and civilians and to point out critical terrain features for the assault companies. Having been born and raised in Pyongyang, Korea, his services were of inestimable value and his knowledge of the terrain was of material aid in planning the attack. When he learned that a combat patrol was assigned the mission of entering and clearing a native village he voluntarily accompanied the patrol and while leading the patrol through the village he was mortally wounded and gallantly gave his life for his country. Lieutenant Shaw's display of initiative and heroic actions were in keeping with the highest traditions of the United States Naval Service.

== Awards and decorations ==
- Silver Star Medal (1950)
- Gold Star Eulji - Order of Military Merit (1956, wrongly reported Gold Star Chungmu - Order of Military Merit)

== Legacy ==
In Nokbeon-dong, Eunpyeong District, Seoul (where he was killed in action), a park memorializes his service.

In Mokwon University (Shaw's father - William Earl Shaw was founding member), a church memorializes his sacrifice.

On 29 April 2019, During his visit to the United States, South Korean President Yoon Suk-yeol remarked on his contribution in a lecture at Harvard University.

On 21 April 2023, William Hamilton Shaw and William Earl Shaw (Shaw's father also served in the Korean War as military chaplain) were selected as one of 10 Korean War heroes by South Korean Ministry of Patriots and Veterans Affairs and ROK/US Combined Forces Command.
