= Korean Military Advisory Group =

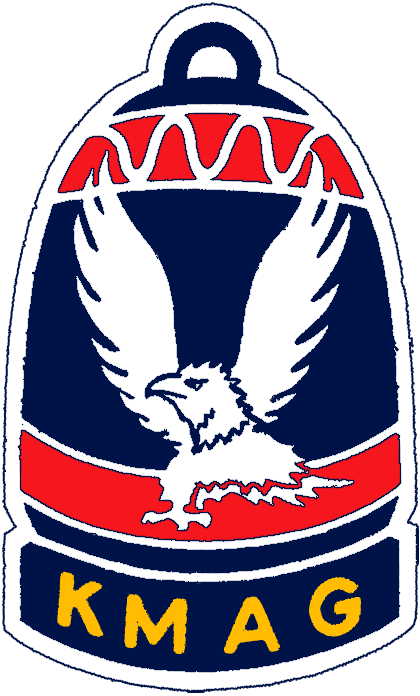
- Shoulder Sleeve Insignia for KMAG
- Active: est. 15 August 1948 - November 1954
- Country: United States

Commanders
- Notable commanders: Francis W. Farrell; Cornelius E. Ryan; Gordon B. Rogers

Insignia
- KMAG: KMAG Insignia

The Korean Military Advisory Group (KMAG) (officially United States Military Advisory Group to the Republic of Korea) was a United States military unit of the Korean War. It helped to train and provide logistic support for the Republic of Korea Army.

== History ==
Following the end of World War II, the United States and the Soviet Union split up the administration of Korea, with the United States taking charge of the southern half. Beginning in January 1946, the U.S. military government in the south began to form a Korean defense force, and 18 lieutenants from the U.S. Army's 40th Infantry Division were tasked with organizing eight Korea Constabulary Regiments (one for each province), which were to act as a police force. The Constabulary grew rapidly, from 2,000 men in April 1946 to 50,000 in March 1948. When the ROK declared independence on 15 August 1948, the Constabulary was absorbed into the Republic of Korea Army, and the United States created a Provisional Military Advisory Group (PMAG) to continue the work of training and advising the fledgling South Korean military, led by Brigadier General William Lynn Roberts (USMA 1913). The 100 American advisors in Korea, working under the auspices of the Department of Internal Security (DIS), were reassigned to PMAG at this time, and the unit's roster was expanded.

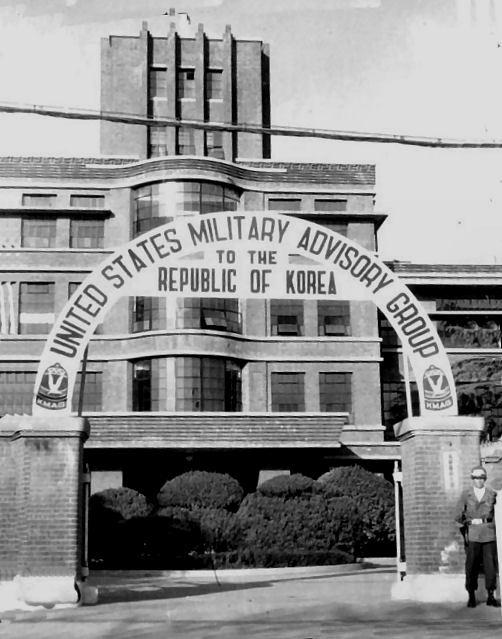
KMAG Headquarters, Daegu, South Korea circa 1950

On July 1, 1949, PMAG was redesignated the United States Military Advisory Group to the Republic of Korea (KMAG).

When North Korean forces invaded South Korea on June 25, 1950, KMAG became the United States Military Advisory Group, Korea, 8668th Army Unit, under the command of the United States Eighth Army. Brigadier General Francis W. Farrell (USMA 1920) took command of the unit on July 25 and had to face high rejection rate within South Korean draftees, when after a month, the Replacement Training Center had rejected 10,000 recruits as medically or physically unfit. On 28 December 1950, it was renamed as the 8202nd Army Unit.

KMAG had also short supplies of were tents, radios, ambulances, clothing, food and water, fuel, sandbags, wood planking, compasses, rifle cleaning kits, medical supplies, and above all, ammunition. Farrell also fought with the lack of qualified instructors. New Commanding general of Eighth Army, James Van Fleet, was not fully satisfied with the progress of KMAG and although he thought Farrell had done a wonderful job as KMAG chief, he felt that Farrell was “completely worn out and needed a change.”

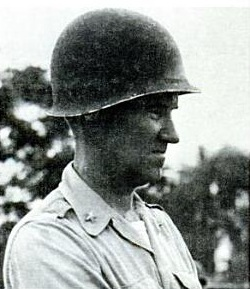
Brigadier General Francis W. Farrell

Van Fleet requested highly qualified troop trainer, Brigadier general Cornelius E. Ryan, a former commander of 101st Airborne Division, whom he knew from his previous assignment in the United States. Ryan assumed command on July 7, 1951 with the task was to transform the Republic of Korea Army (ROKA) into a fighting force capable of carrying its weight in United States Eighth Army and make Korean Military Advisory Group responsive to the needs of the Republic of Korea Army.

He developed strong relation with his counterparts, generals Lee Chong-chan and Paik Sun-yup and worked together on plans to make a new army. When Ryan arrived in Korea, KMAG had 920 officers and men assigned to it and by September 1951, Ryan supervised 1,308 advisors. He later increased the number of KMAG advisors to the total strength of 1,812 personnel by January 1952. Altogether, 499,751 trainees passed through the KMAG Replacement Training Center system from July 1950 through August 1953.

Under his leadership, KMAG transformed into a first-class military training and advisory mission. Under his experienced direction, KMAG then inaugurated a series of training and organizational reforms that laid the basis for a Korean Army capable of fighting the Chinese on more equal terms. Ryan served in Korea until mid-May 1953, when he was succeeded by Brigadier general Gordon B. Rogers.

== Command Structure ==
=== Chiefs of the KMAG ===
- BG William L. Roberts (July 1, 1949 – July 25, 1950)
- BG Francis W. Farrell (July 25, 1950 – July 7, 1951)
- MG Cornelius E. Ryan (July 7, 1951 – May 14, 1953)
- BG Gordon B. Rogers (May 14, 1953 – October 1953)
- MG Eugene Ware Ridings (October 1953 – May 1954)
- MG Halley G. Maddox (June 1954 – November 1954)

=== Deputy Chiefs ===
- BG Arthur S. Champeny (July 1951 – 1953)

== Legacy ==
Dr. Shiela Miyoshi Jager of the Strategic Studies Institute has supported using the highly successful KMAG methods as a model for the Multi-National Security Transition Command - Iraq in its development of the New Iraqi Army.
