= Alexandru Dobriceanu =

Romanian Army officer

Major-General Alexandru Dobriceanu
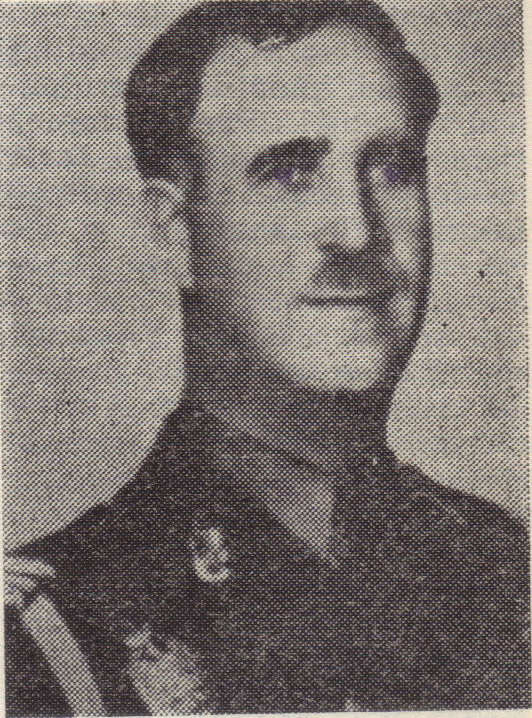
- Alexandru Dobriceanu, as Colonel
- Born: 19 September 1894; Craiova, Dolj County, Kingdom of Romania
- Died: 10 February 1978 (aged 83); Bucharest, Socialist Republic of Romania
- Education: Higher War School
- Military career
- Allegiance: Romania
- Branch: Army
- Rank: major general
- Conflicts: Second Balkan War; World War I; Battle of Mărășești; Hungarian–Romanian War; World War II; Operation München; Siege of Odessa; Battle of Turda; Battle of Debrecen
- Awards: Order of the Crown, Officer rank Order of Saint Stanislaus; Order of the Star of Romania, Officer rank Czechoslovak War Cross 1939–1945; Military Order of the White Lion; Order of Michael the Brave, 3rd class

Alexandru A. Dobriceanu (19 September 1894 – 10 February 1978) was an officer in the Romanian Army who fought in both World War I and World War II, and rose to the rank of major general afterwards.

== Biography ==
=== Early life ===
He was born on 19 September 1894 in Craiova, Dolj County, in the Oltenia region of the Kingdom of Romania. He descended from a family from Dobriceni, Olt County with a long military tradition. His father, Sergeant Alexandru Dobriceanu-Chiorul fought at the Siege of Plevna during the Romanian War of Independence, where he lost his left eye. Young Dobriceanu spent part of his childhood in the family compound at Dobriceni, and then returned to Craiova.

=== Military career ===
In 1913 he went to study at the Artillery Officer School in Bucharest; soon after, he was sent to fight in Southern Dobruja, during the Second Balkan War. He graduated in 1916 with the rank of second lieutenant, and starting in July he served with the heavy artillery 1st Regiment–Dolj. He fought during the Romanian Campaign of World War I, notably at the Battle of Mărășești, when he was gravely wounded in his left arm at Muncelu, on 6 August 1917. While recovering in a hospital, he was promoted to lieutenant. In 1919 he participated in the Hungarian–Romanian War, commanding his platoon all the way to Budapest.

After being promoted to captain in 1923, he studied at the Higher War School in Bucharest from 1928 to 1930. From 1929 to 1938 he served as staff officer with the elite Vânători de munte troops. He advanced in rank to major in 1934 and lieutenant colonel in 1938, after which he took command of the 1st Regiment–Dolj. On behalf of the General Staff, Dobriceanu attended in 1937 the Geneva International Conference for the protection of prisoners of war and civilian population, and was a delegate at the Prague Conference of the Little Entente. In June 1940 he was awarded the Order of the Crown, Officer rank.

=== World War II ===
On 22 June 1941 Romania joined Operation Barbarossa in order to reclaim the lost territories of Bessarabia and Bukovina, which had been annexed by the Soviet Union in June 1940. Dobriceanu was in command of the 3rd Battalion of the Vânători de Gardă Regiment. His troops crossed the Prut River and took control of Lărguța on 12 July. For his actions during this operation he was awarded on 22 September the Order of the Star of Romania, Officer rank. Subsequently, he took part in the Siege of Odessa. He was promoted to Colonel in June 1943 and was put in command of the 1st Heavy Artillery Regiment.

In April 1944 he was commanding the 1st Regiment during the First Jassy–Kishinev Offensive, providing artillery support for Friedrich Mieth's IV Army Corps. After King Michael's Coup of 23 August 1944, Romania switched sides and joined the Allies. Dobriceanu disengaged his regiment and took new positions at Poienarii Burchii, just south of Ploiești. On 7 September he was assigned to the 4th Army (commanded by General Gheorghe Avramescu), in support of the 6th Infantry Division. He fought against the German and Hungarian forces in the Battle of Turda, first at Târnăveni, and then along the Mureș River Valley. He continued advancing with the 4th Army towards Oradea and then crossed into Hungary. On 19 October, at the battle for Rákóczifalva, his regiment fought was attacked by some 50–60 Tiger and Panther tanks, coming from the direction of Szolnok. Although lacking infantry support, skillful maneuvering and precise firing of the artillery pieces carried the day; four German tanks were destroyed and several damaged, while only two Romanian guns were lost. For this feat of arms, Dobriceanu was awarded in 1945 the Order of Michael the Brave, 3rd class. By the end of the war he had advanced with his artillery regiment all the way to Brno in Czechoslovakia.

=== After the war ===
Dobriceanu was put in reserve on 9 August 1946, promoted to brigadier general on 21 December, and retired on 9 August 1947. After the establishment of the Communist regime, he was tried for participating in the fighting on the Eastern Front and was declared a war criminal. All his properties (including the family mansion from Dobriceni) were confiscated, he was demoted to the rank of soldier, and was put under forced domicile. Fortuitously, he met in 1966 his former orderly, Andruță Ceaușescu, who agreed to intercede with his son, Nicolae Ceaușescu. As a result, Dobriceanu was rehabilitated, his property in the Dorobanți neighborhood was returned to him, and he was promoted to major general (in the reserves) in 1967. That same year he published a book of his war memoirs.

He died on 10 February 1978 in Bucharest. Some of his memorabilia are displayed in the village museum at Dobriceni, while part of his book collection is with the Municipal Library in Târnăveni.

Dobriceanu had a daughter, Sanda, and a son, Alexandru (Ricu), who was an Air Force pilot in World War II, then worked for many years as an engineer on restoration projects for the fortified church in Prejmer and the St. Nicholas Church in Brașov, before leaving for France.

== Awards ==
- Order of the Crown (Romania), Officer rank (8 June 1940).
- Order of Saint Stanislaus (House of Romanov).
- Order of the Star of Romania, Officer rank (22 September 1941).
- Czechoslovak War Cross 1939–1945.
- Military Order of the White Lion.
- Order of Michael the Brave, 3rd class (4 August 1945).
