= Communist partisans in the Korean War =

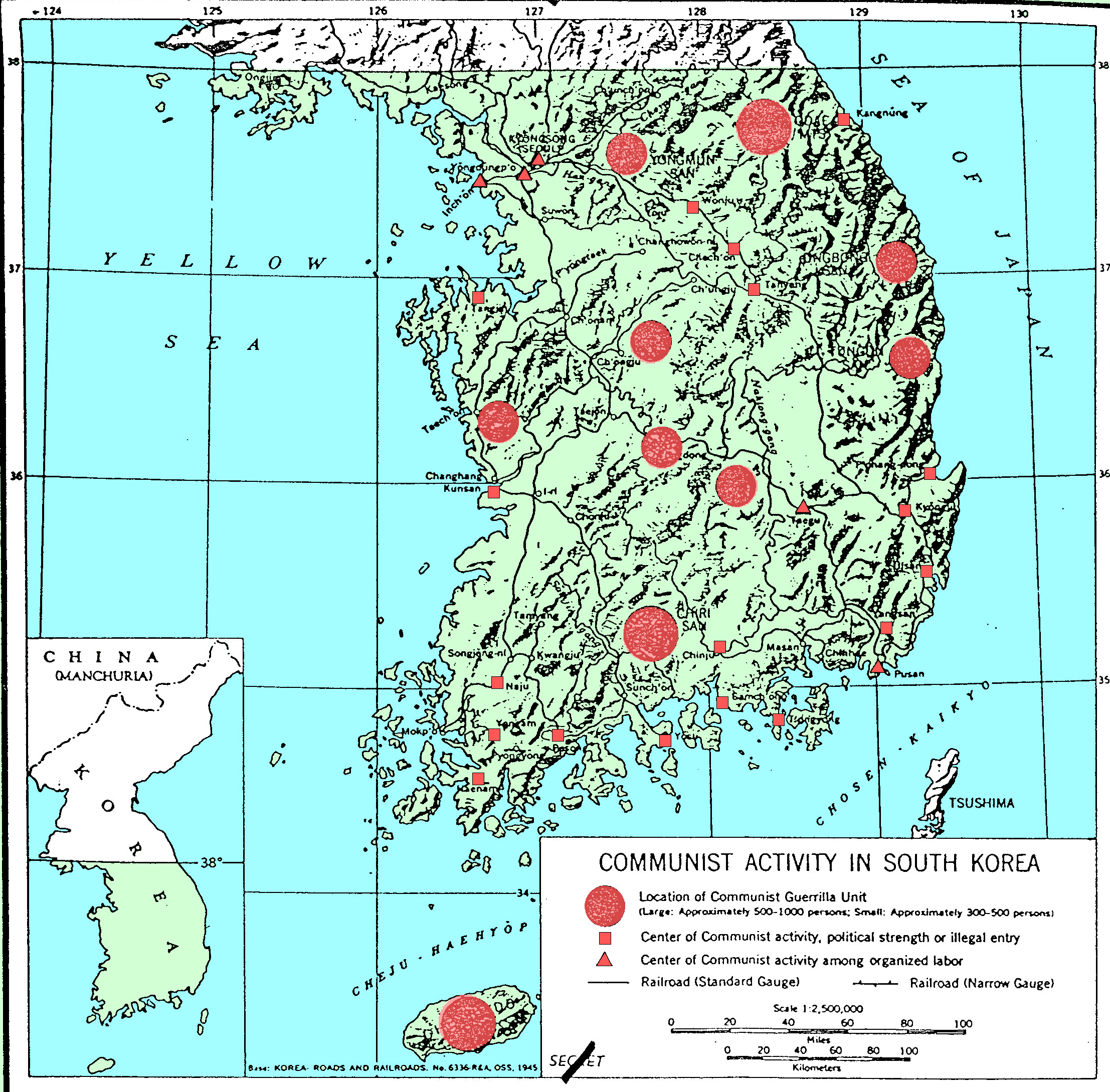
Map of communist activity in South Korea in February 1949 according to the CIA

Communist partisans were active before, during and after the Korean War in South Korea. They are considered the remnants of the Korean People's Army of the Democratic People's Republic of Korea (DPRK), prior insurgents who had fought against the Republic of Korea (ROK) before the KPA invaded, as well as local civilians who supported the DPRK in the region that either the KPA or the partisans had occupied. They could be considered as belligerent forces behind the 38th parallel before the Korean War, behind the front lines during the Korean War, and behind the demilitarized zone after the Korean War.

By October 1950, the number of Communist guerrilla troops south of the thirty-eight parallel reached over 15,000. Following the defeat of the KPA at the Battle of the Pusan Perimeter, more than 10,000 KPA remnants and Communist partisans retreated to Jirisan, the second highest mountain in South Korea. The ROK deployed two divisions from October 1950 to May 1951 and with American aid destroyed the majority of the Communist partisans in Jirisan during multiple campaigns, with the final campaign, Operation Rat Killer, successfully destroying the insurgency in Jirisan.

== Terminology ==
They are usually called by the name of:

- ppalchisan (빨치산; a transliteration of partisan),
- nambugun (남부군),
- kongsan bijok (공산비적) like Viet Cong, 공산주의 or 공산 means communism.
- kongbi (공비)(abbreviation of 공산비적),
- communist guerrillas (공산 게릴라).

The term KongBi has now become a general term for any armed North Korean infiltrators.

== Background ==
- 1894 First Sino-Japanese War (1894–96), Qing Dynasty is defeated, its influence over Korea ended, and the Empire of Japan's influence over Korea rapidly increases.
- 1905 Russo-Japanese War (1904–05), Japan made Korea its protectorate with the Eulsa Treaty in 1905.

=== Japanese rule (1910–1945) ===
- 1910 Japan–Korea Annexation Treaty, Japan annexed Korea.
- 1931 Japanese Mukden Incident.
- 1937 Second Sino-Japanese War.
- 1941 Japanese Attack on Pearl Harbor.
- 1943 November Cairo Conference (November 1943), Nationalist China, the United Kingdom, and the United States decided "in due course Korea shall become free and independent".

=== Korea divided (1945–1949) ===
- 1945 August Japanese Surrender
- 1945 Soviet invasion of Manchuria
- 1945 Chinese Civil War (1945–1949)
- 1945, 10 August 1945, the Soviet forces occupied the northern part of the Korean peninsula.
- 1945, 26 August 1945, the Soviet forces halted at the 38th parallel for 3 weeks to await the arrival of US forces in the south
- 1945, 8 September 1945, an army of the United States arrived in Incheon to accept the Japanese surrender south of the 38th parallel, and the United States Army Military Government in Korea (미군정;USMGIK) began.
- 1945 December, Moscow Conference (1945) decided that a four-power trusteeship of up to five years would be needed before Korea attained independence due to this tensions in Southern Korea grew and USMGIK tried to calm down civil violence in the south by banning strikes on December 8 and outlawing the revolutionary government and the people's committees on December 12, 1945.
- 1946 March, Kim Il Sung initiated a large-scale land reform program in the north.
- 1946, August 28, the Workers' Party of North Korea (북조선노동당) was established in the north.
- 1946, September 23, A massive strike occurred by 8,000 railway workers in Busan which quickly spread to other cities in the South.
- 1946, October 1, The Autumn Uprising of 1946 (대구 10·1 사건). USMGIK declared martial law, and suppressed the uprising
- 1946, November 23, Workers Party of South Korea (남로당, 남조선노동당), a communist party in the south was established, however, it was outlawed by the U.S. occupation authorities, the USMGIK.

== Sources ==
- The information in this article is based on that in its Korean equivalent.
