= Military Order of the White Lion =

Czech military award

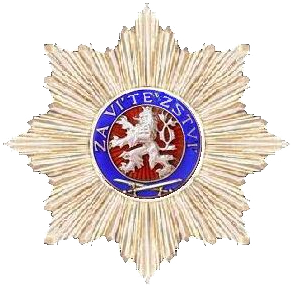
- Type: 5 Class Military Order of Merit
- Awarded for: Military merit, either personal acts of bravery or leadership.
- Presented by: Czechoslovakia
- Eligibility: Czech citizens and foreigners
- Campaign: World War II
- Status: No longer awarded
- Established: 9 February 1945
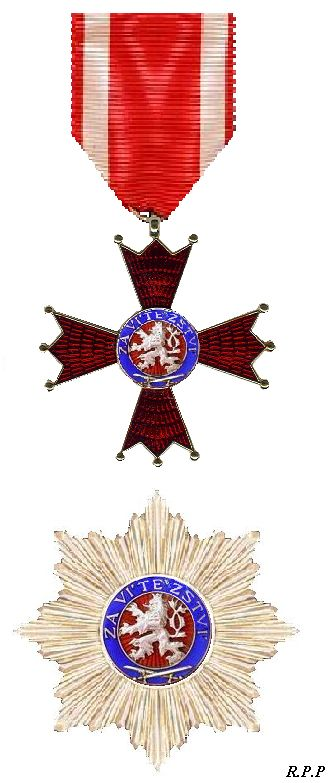
- Third class cross and second class star
- Related: Order of the White Lion

The Military Order of the White Lion (Czech: Vojenský řád Bílého lva „Za vítězství“), also known as the Military Order of the White Lion "For Victory", was an award established on 9 February 1945 to reward military merit, either personal acts of bravery or leadership.

The order was presented in five different classes, the first class decorations being a gold breast star, while the second class was a silver breast star. The third class was in the form of a silver cross, enameled in red, and worn suspended from a ribbon on the chest. The fourth and fifth classes were a gold and silver medal respectively. The insignia of the first and second classes borrowed heavily in design from the Order of the White Lion. Both orders utilized an eight pointed star, with the center medallion containing the crowned white lion of the Coat of arms of Czechoslovakia. The difference came with the color of the medallion's border and motto that it contained, being blue on the Military Order of the White Lion. The motto was "Za vítězství" ('For victory'), versus the Order of the White Lion's motto of "Pravda vítezí" ('Truth prevails').

Ribbon bars of the Military Order of the White Lion
| First Class Gold Star | Second Class Silver Star | Third Class Cross | Fourth Class Gold Medal | Fifth Class Silver Medal |

== Notable recipients ==
- Alexandru Dobriceanu
- Dwight D. Eisenhower
- Douglas Evill
- František Fajtl
- Jozef Gabčík
- Jan Kubiš
- Jean de Lattre de Tassigny
- Douglas MacArthur
- Bernard Montgomery, 1st Viscount Montgomery of Alamein
- Adolf Opálka
- George S. Patton
- James Robb
- Semyon Timoshenko
- Georgy Zhukov
- Nikita Brilev
- Mohammad Reza Pahlavi
