= William R. Schmidt =

United States Army general

William Richard Schmidt
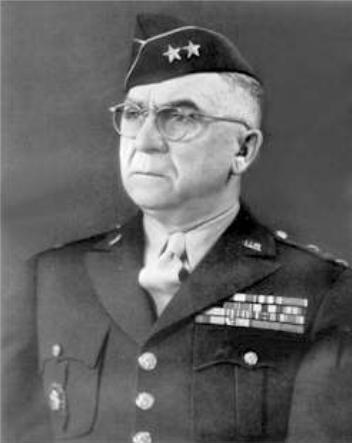
- Born: October 14, 1889; Verdigre, Nebraska, United States
- Died: July 18, 1966 (aged 76); Washington, D.C., United States
- Military career
- Allegiance: United States
- Branch: United States Army
- Service years: 1913–1951
- Rank: Major General
- Service number: 0-3573
- Unit: Infantry Branch
- Commands: 39th Infantry Regiment; 76th Infantry Division; 3rd Infantry Division; 101st Airborne Division
- Conflicts: Pancho Villa Expedition; World War I World War II; Cold War
- Awards: Army Distinguished Service Medal; Silver Star; Legion of Merit

William Richard Schmidt (October 14, 1889 – July 18, 1966) was a decorated United States Army officer who spent most of World War II as commanding the 76th Infantry Division.

== Early life and military career ==
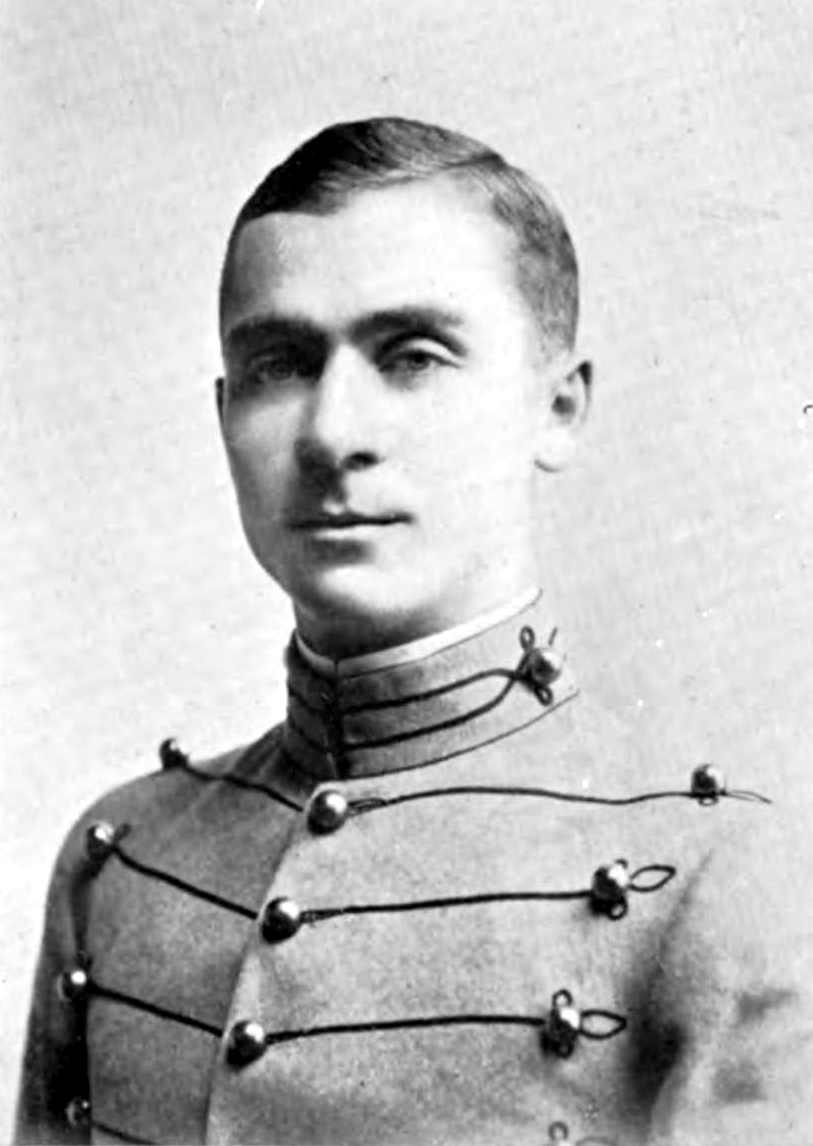
At West Point in 1913

William Richard Schmidt was born on October 14, 1889, the son of Joseph Karl and his wife Anna (née Haman). Seeking a military career, he entered the United States Military Academy (USMA) at West Point, New York, in 1909. He graduated, 54 in a class of 93, four years later on June 12, 1913, which led to him being commissioned as an officer, with the rank of second lieutenant, into the Infantry Branch of the United States Army on the same date.

Between 1913 and 1917, Schmidt served on the Mexico–United States border during the Pancho Villa Expedition. During this campaign, he was promoted to first lieutenant. Schmidt did not see combat in France on the Western Front during World War I and instead performed stateside duty at Schofield Barracks in Pearl Harbor, at Presidio of San Francisco and at Camp Fremont, California.

== Between the wars ==
In 1921, now with the rank of major, Schmidt was transferred back to the USMA, where he was an instructor in the department of chemistry, mineralogy and geology. He stayed in this position until 1923, when he was transferred back to Hawaii.

Schmidt attended the U.S. Army Command and General Staff School at Fort Leavenworth, Kansas in 1928.

In 1933, he was appointed executive officer (XO) of the Civilian Conservation Corps at Camp Dix, New Jersey, and served there for one year. Then he was transferred to Washington, D.C., where he was assigned to the Supply branch (G-4 Division) of the War Department General Staff on March 21, 1934.

== World War II ==
In 1940, Schmidt was appointed commander of the 39th Infantry Regiment a, part of the 9th Infantry Division, and stayed in this capacity until the end of 1941. He was subsequently promoted to the one-star general officer rank of brigadier general in April 1942, four months after the American entry into World War II, and transferred to the newly activated 81st Infantry Division, where he became the assistant division commander (ADC) for Major General Gustave H. Franke, the division commander, for a short time.

Schmidt was transferred to the 76th Infantry Division on December 13, 1942, where he succeeded Major General Emil F. Reinhardt in command of the 76th Division. His chief of staff was initially Herbert T. Perrin. He was also promoted to the temporary two-star rank of major general in December 1942.

Schmidt stayed with the division throughout the rest of the war. He led the 76th Division overseas, first to England in December 1944, then a month later when it was sent to the Western Front, in the Ardennes-Alsace Campaign and Central Europe Campaign for which he received the Army Distinguished Service Medal, Silver Star, Legion of Merit and others.

== Postwar ==
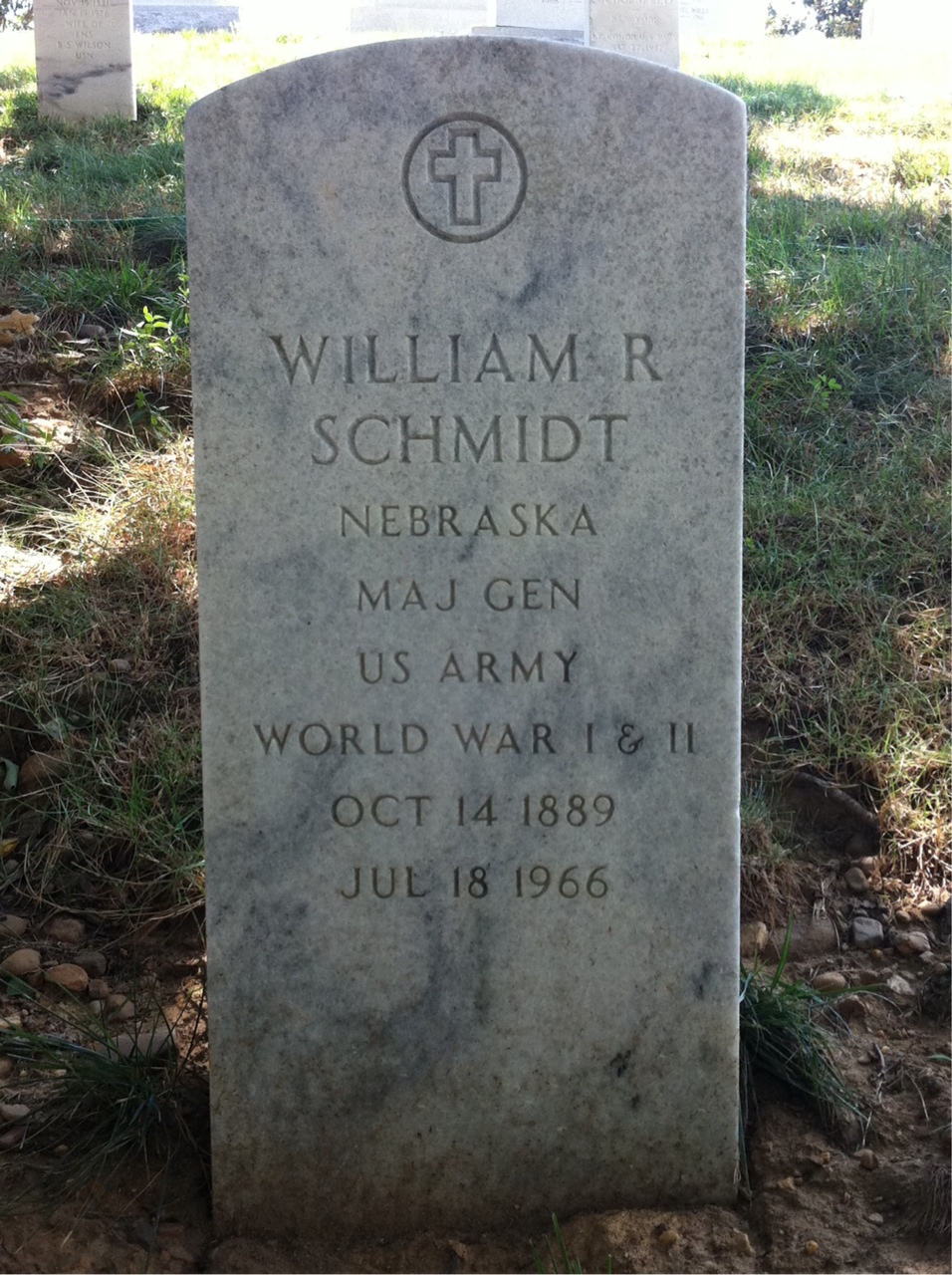
The grave of Major General William R. Schmidt at Arlington National Cemetery

In August 1945, Major General Schmidt assumed command of the 3rd Infantry Division, as a part of the occupational forces in Germany. Schmidt was then transferred to the Third Army under command of Lieutenant General Geoffrey Keyes, his classmate from West Point, where he became the chief of staff on May 20, 1946. From July 1948 to May 1949 he commanded the 101st Airborne Division.

Major General William Schmidt retired from the army, after 38 years of service, in 1951 and died at the age of 76 on July 18, 1966, in Walter Reed Army Medical Center in Washington, D.C. He was buried at Arlington National Cemetery, Virginia, together with his wife Helen Munn Goodier, with whom he had two daughters.

== Decorations ==
Here is Major general Schmidt's ribbon bar:

1st Row	Army Distinguished Service Medal		Silver Star	
2nd Row	Legion of Merit	Bronze Star Medal with Oak Leaf Cluster	Mexican Service Medal	World War I Victory Medal
3rd Row	American Defense Service Medal	American Campaign Medal	European-African-Middle Eastern Campaign Medal with four campaign stars	World War II Victory Medal
4th Row	Army of Occupation Medal with "Germany" clasp	National Defense Service Medal	Grand Officer of the Dutch Order of Orange-Nassau with Swords	Ecuadorian Order of Abdon Calderón, 2nd Class
5th Row	Officer of the Legion of Honor (France)	French Croix de guerre 1939-1945 with Palm	Belgian Croix de guerre 1940-1945 with Palm	Czechoslovak War Cross 1939-1945

== See also ==
- 76th Infantry Division
- Battle of the Bulge

Military offices
Preceded by Emil F. Reinhardt	Commanding General 76th Infantry Division; 1942–1945	Succeeded by Henry C. Evans
Preceded by John W. O'Daniel	Commanding General 3rd Infantry Division; 1945–1946	Succeeded by Post deactivated
Preceded by Newly activated post	Commanding General 101st Airborne Division; 1948–1949	Succeeded by Cornelius E. Ryan
