= Francis William Farrell =

United States Army general

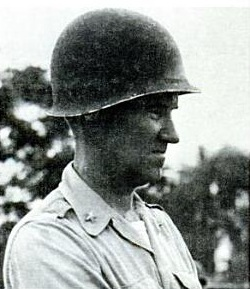
- Farrell in command of Korean Military Advisory Group, circa 1951
- Born: 28 May 1900; Chicago, Illinois, US
- Died: 27 January 1981 (aged 80); Arlington, Virginia, US
- Burial place: Arlington National Cemetery
- Military career
- Allegiance: United States
- Branch: United States Army
- Service years: 1920–1960
- Rank: Lieutenant General
- Service number: 0-12784
- Unit: Infantry Branch
- Commands: 11th Airborne Division Artillery; 13th Airborne Division Artillery; Korean Military Advisory Group; 82nd Airborne Division; United States V Corps; Seventh United States Army
- Conflicts: World War II; Korean War
- Awards: Distinguished Service Medal; Silver Star; Legion of Merit; Bronze Star
- Other work: New York State Civil Defense Director

Francis William Farrell (28 May 1900 – 27 January 1981) was a lieutenant general in the United States Army. He successively commanded the 82nd Airborne Division, V Corps and Seventh United States Army.

== Early life ==
Farrell was born on 28 May 1900, in Chicago, Illinois.

== Start of military career ==
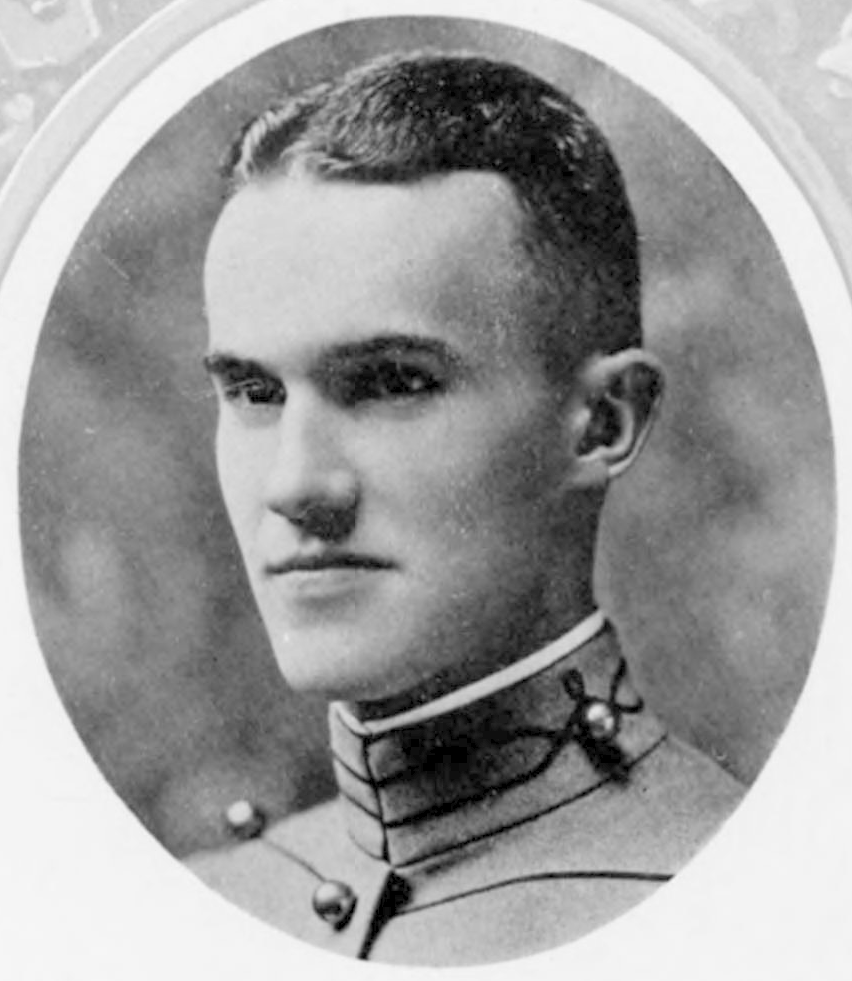
At West Point in 1920

He graduated from the United States Military Academy in 1920. Initially assigned to the infantry branch, General Farrell graduated from the Infantry Officer Course in 1921. He then served in several infantry assignments, including postings to Hawaii and China. In 1928, General Farrell transferred to the Field Artillery branch. He completed the Field Artillery Officer Course in 1928.

In the late 1920s and early 1930s, he was an instructor at West Point. he graduated from the Command and General Staff College in 1939.

== World War II ==
From 1942 to 1944, Farrell served in the Pacific Theater as chief of staff of the 11th Airborne Division. He commanded the 11th Airborne Division Artillery from 1944 to 1946.

== Post-World War II ==
After World War II, Farrell was assigned to Fort Bragg, North Carolina as commander of the 13th Airborne Division Artillery. In mid-1946, Farrell was named chief of staff of the 82nd Airborne Division. He served in this assignment for only a few months before being appointed as chief of the Air Branch at Army Ground Forces, where he remained from late 1946 until 1948. Farrell was named director of the Technical Training Group at Sandia Missile Base, New Mexico in 1948.

== Korean War ==
From 1950 to 1951, he was commander of the Korean Military Advisory Group, responsible for training and logistical support to the fledgling South Korean Army.

== Post-Korean War ==
In 1952, Farrell was assigned as deputy assistant chief of staff for operations on the Army Staff, serving until 1953. He commanded the 82nd Airborne Division from 1953 to 1955. In 1955, he was assigned as special assistant for national security affairs, advising the Joint Chiefs of Staff. General Farrell was named to command V Corps in 1957, serving until 1959. In 1959, General Farrell was assigned as commander of the Seventh United States Army, remaining in this post until he reached retirement age in 1960.

== Civilian work ==
After retiring from the Army in 1960, General Farrell was appointed as New York State's Civil Defense Director, serving from 1961 to 1963.

== Retirement and death ==
In retirement, he resided in Arlington, Virginia, where he died on January 27, 1981. He was buried in Section 30 of Arlington National Cemetery.

Farrell had married Anne Ramsey (27 December 1909 – 20 May 2011) on 15 July 1931, at West Point, New York. The couple had a son, a daughter and six grandchildren. Their son Francis William Farrell Jr. (born 5 October 1938) is a 1960 graduate of the U.S. Military Academy who served in Vietnam and attained the rank of colonel. After Lt. Gen. Farrell's death, Anne Farrell remarried in April 1982 with retired General James Edward Moore, whose first wife had died in September 1976. Anne Farrell Moore was interred next to her first husband on 6 September 2011.

== Awards ==
His awards and decorations included two Distinguished Service Medals, the Silver Star, the Legion of Merit, two awards of the Bronze Star, and two Air Medals.
