= McHenry, Kentucky =

- City
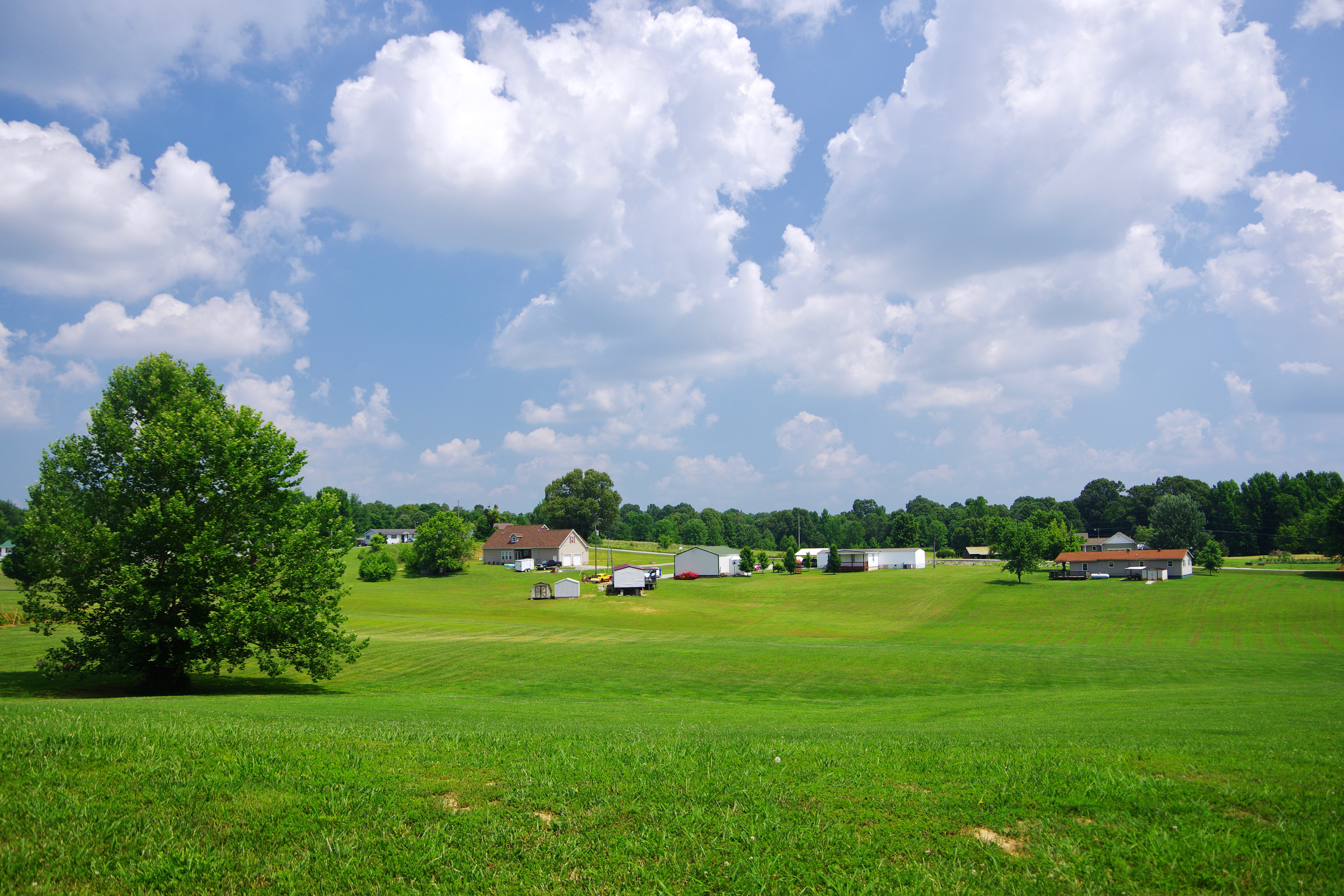
- McHenry

- Location of McHenry in Ohio County, Kentucky.
- Coordinates: 37°22′42″N 86°55′21″W
- Country: United States
- State: Kentucky
- County: Ohio
- Incorporated: 1880
- Named for: Rep. Henry D. McHenry

Area
  - Total: 0.65 sq mi (1.68 km^{2})
  - Land: 0.65 sq mi (1.68 km^{2})
  - Water: 0.0039 sq mi (0.01 km^{2})
- Elevation: 420 ft (128 m)

Population (2020)
  - Total: 369
  - Density: 570.3/sq mi (220.19/km^{2})
- Time zone: UTC-6 (Central (CST))
  - Summer (DST): UTC-5 (CDT)
- ZIP code: 42354
- Area code: 270
- FIPS code: 21-49098
- GNIS feature ID: 0497881

McHenry is a home rule-class city in Ohio County, Kentucky, in the United States. As of the 2020 census, McHenry had a population of 369.

== History ==
Originally called Hamelton, the village was renamed in 1874 to honor Congressman Henry D. McHenry.

== Geography ==
McHenry is located at 37°22′42″N 86°55′21″W (37.378399, -86.922391). The city is situated along U.S. Route 62 southwest of Beaver Dam and northeast of Central City. According to the United States Census Bureau, the city has a total area of 0.7 square miles (1.8 km^{2}), all land.

== Demographics ==
Historical population
Census	Pop.	Note	%±
1880	124		—
1890	463		273.4%
1900	550		18.8%
1910	580		5.5%
1920	439		−24.3%
1930	608		38.5%
1940	722		18.8%
1950	511		−29.2%
1960	446		−12.7%
1970	420		−5.8%
1980	582		38.6%
1990	414		−28.9%
2000	417		0.7%
2010	388		−7.0%
2020	369		−4.9%
U.S. Decennial Census

As of the census of 2000, there were 417 people, 161 households, and 118 families residing in the city. The population density was 599.9 inhabitants per square mile (231.6/km^{2}). There were 186 housing units at an average density of 267.6 per square mile (103.3/km^{2}). The racial makeup of the city was 100.00% White.

There were 161 households, out of which 32.3% had children under the age of 18 living with them, 53.4% were married couples living together, 13.7% had a female householder with no husband present, and 26.1% were non-families. 19.9% of all households were made up of individuals, and 6.8% had someone living alone who was 65 years of age or older. The average household size was 2.59 and the average family size was 3.00.

In the city, the population was spread out, with 27.6% under the age of 18, 7.9% from 18 to 24, 30.9% from 25 to 44, 20.4% from 45 to 64, and 13.2% who were 65 years of age or older. The median age was 35 years. For every 100 females, there were 93.1 males. For every 100 females age 18 and over, there were 96.1 males.

The median income for a household in the city was $23,000, and the median income for a family was $28,750. Males had a median income of $28,750 versus $15,104 for females. The per capita income for the city was $12,847. About 20.2% of families and 24.1% of the population were below the poverty line, including 33.0% of those under age 18 and 25.4% of those age 65 or over.

== Notable people ==
- Halley G. Maddox, U.S. Army major general
