= Order of Military Merit (South Korea) =

Military medal in South Korea

Awarded by South Korea
- Type: Order of merit
- Awarded for: Outstanding military services by participating in an action in time of war or in quasi-state of war or by performing his/her duty equivalent to combat, such as responding to the attack of an enemy in a contact area.
- Status: Active
- Grades: Taegeuk; Eulji; Chungmu; Hwarang; Inheon; Gold and Silver stars
- Former grades: First Class Order of Military Merit, Second Class Order of Military Merit, Third Class Order of Military Merit, Fourth Class Order of Military Merit

Precedence
- Next (higher): Grand Order of Mugunghwa
- Related: Order of National Foundation; Order of Civil Merit; Order of Service Merit; Order of National Security Merit; Order of Diplomatic Service Merit; Order of Industrial Service Merit; Order of Saemaeul Service Merit; Order of Cultural Merit; Order of Sports Merit; Order of Science and Technology Merit

- Korean name
- Hangul: 무공훈장
- Hanja: 武功勳章
- RR: Mugong hunjang
- MR: Mugong hunjang

The Order of Military Merit (Korean: 무공훈장, Hanja: 武功勳章) is the primary military decoration awarded by the South Korean government.

It is awarded to a person who rendered "outstanding military services by participating in an action in time of war or in quasi-state of war or by performing his/her duty equivalent to combat, such as responding to the attack of an enemy in a contact area."

== History ==
On 18 October 1950, law about Order of Military Merit was enacted.

Original names are as follows:

- First Class Order of Military Merit,
- Second Class Order of Military Merit,
- Third Class Order of Military Merit,
- Fourth Class Order of Military Merit

On 19 August 1951, The names were changed as follows:

- Taegeuk Order of Military Merit,
- Eulji Order of Military Merit,
- Chungmu Order of Military Merit,
- Hwarang Order of Military Merit

On 14 December 1963, Inheon Order of Military Merit was added.

== Classes and Grades ==
The Order of Military Merit is awarded in five classes and each of these has three grades. In descending order of rank, the classes are: Taegeuk (태극), Eulji (을지), Chungmu (충무), Hwarang (화랑) and Inheon (인헌).

Taegeuk (태극), Eulji (을지), Chungmu (충무), Hwarang (화랑) had a first, second or third grade, denoted respectively by a gold star (금성), silver star (은성), or an unadorned ribbon (무성).

For example, Gold Star Taegeuk (금성태극), Silver Star Taegeuk (은성태극), or Unadorned Taegeuk. (무성태극)

Since 1964, there are only five classes authorized as below.

Class	Name	Namesake	Ribbon
1st	Taegeuk (Note: Sometimes spelt 'Taeguk') (태극)	Taegeuk	Order of Military Merit (무공훈장)
2nd	Eulji (Note: Sometimes spelt 'Ulchi') (을지)	Eulji Mundeok	Order of Military Merit (무공훈장)
3rd	Chungmu (충무)	Yi Sun-sin	Order of Military Merit (무공훈장)
4th	Hwarang (화랑)	Hwarang	Order of Military Merit (무공훈장)
5th	Inheon (인헌)	Gang Gam-chan	Order of Military Merit (무공훈장)

== Notable recipients ==
※ Date: Date is on the certificate document or on database is prior to date of conferment ceremony.
※ Rank: As of awarded date
※ † indicates that the recipient was killed in action.

=== Taegeuk ===
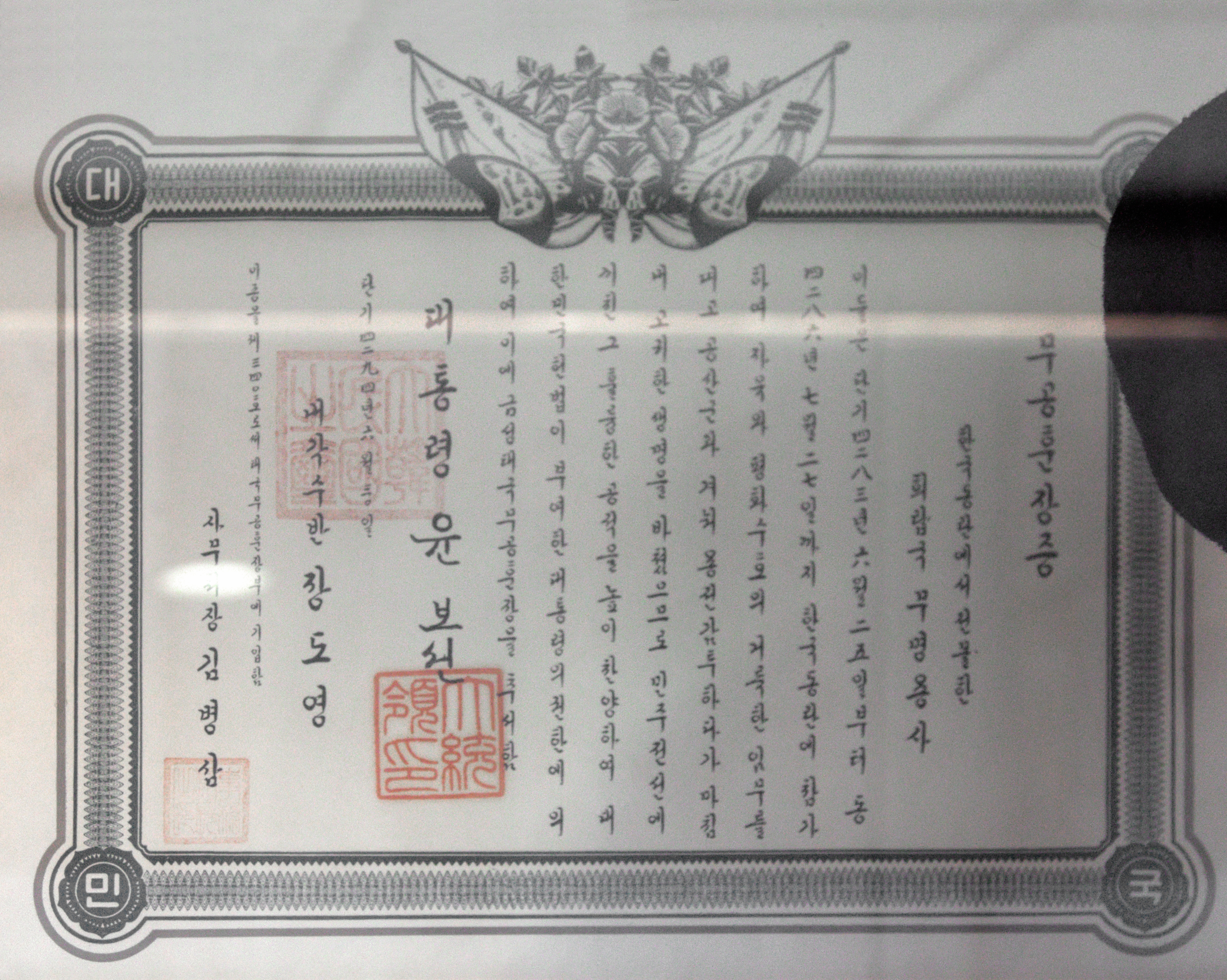
Document of award of the Taegeuk Cordon to the Unknown Dead of Greece for the Greek participation in the Korean War

Name	Service / Unit	Rank	Date	Notes
Douglas MacArthur	United States Army	General of the Army	1950-09-29	
Paik Sun-yup	Republic of Korea Army	Major General	1951-07-26	
Paik Sun-yup	Republic of Korea Army	General	1953-04-05	
Kim Hong-il	Republic of Korea Army	Lieutenant general	1951-07-26	
Sohn Won-yil	Republic of Korea Navy	Admiral	1951-10-30	
Sohn Won-yil	Republic of Korea Navy	Admiral	1953-04-05	
Horace Robertson	Australian Army	Lieutenant general	1951-11-07	
James Van Fleet	United States Army	Lieutenant general	1951-11-27	
Matthew Ridgway	United States Army	Lieutenant general	1952-05-09	
Raoul Magrin-Vernerey	French Army	Lieutenant general (acting Lieutenant colonel)	1952-11-04	
Kim Jong-oh	Republic of Korea Army	Major General	1952-12-26	
Lee Hyung-geun	Republic of Korea Army	Lieutenant general	1952-12-30	
Lee Hyung-geun	Republic of Korea Army	Lieutenant general	1953-05-18	
Im Chung-sik	Republic of Korea Army	Brigadier General	1953-05-20	
Song Yo-chan	Republic of Korea Army	Major General	1953-06-05	
William F. Dean	United States Army	Major general	1953-09-04	
Mark W. Clark	United States Army	General	1953-09-07	
Kim Man-sool	Republic of Korea Army	Second Lieutenant	1954-07-06	
Homer Litzenberg	United States Marine Corps	Major general	1957-10-23	
Frank F. Everest	United States Air Force	General	?	
Cornelius E. Ryan	United States Army	Major general	?	
Thanom Kittikachorn	Royal Thai Army	General	1962	
Kang Jae-gu	Republic of Korea Army	Captain	1966-05-12	
William Westmoreland	United States Army	General	1966-09-06	
Chae Myung-shin	Republic of Korea Army	Lieutenant general	1967-05-20	
Praphas Charusathien	Royal Thai Army	General	1968	
Charles Smith	United States Army	Brigadier General	1975-07-04	
Young-Oak Kim	United States Army	Colonel	2006-02-03	
Edward Rowny	United States Army	Lieutenant general	2014-07-27	
William Speakman	British Army	Sergeant	2015-07-27	
Thomas J. Hudner Jr.	United States Navy	Captain	2015-07-27	
Hector A. Cafferata Jr.	United States Marine Corps	Private First Class	2015-07-27	
Maximo Young	Philippine Army, PEFTOK	Major	2016-07-27	
Conrado Yap †	Philippine Army, PEFTOK	Captain	2018-07-27	
Emil Kapaun †	United States Army	Captain	2021-07-27	
Ralph Puckett Jr.	United States Army	Colonel	2023-04-25	
Royce Williams	United States Navy	Captain	2023-04-25	
Baldomero López †	United States Marine Corps	First lieutenant	2023-04-25	

=== Eulji ===
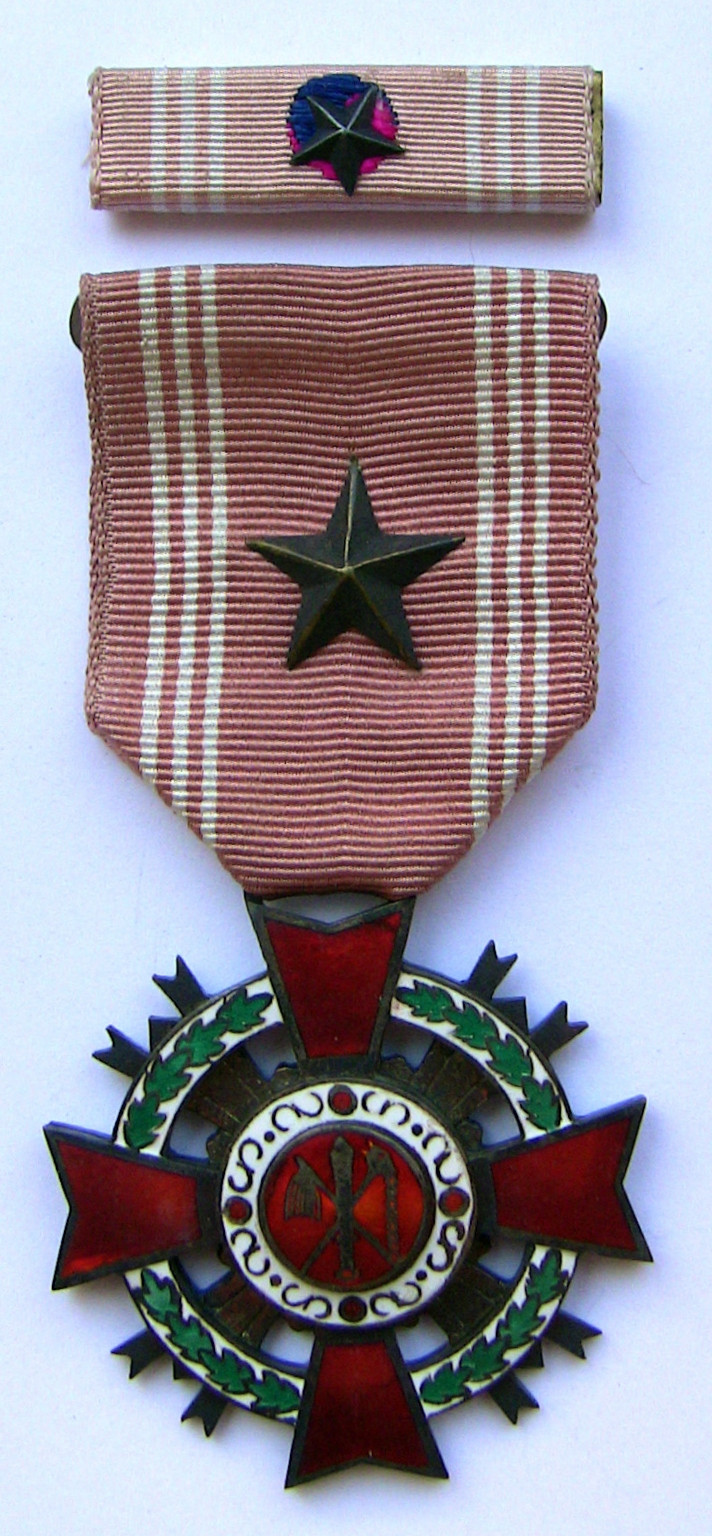
Col. Edwin A. Doss' Eulji Medal with Silver Star (은성 을지무공혼장), 1952–63 design

Name	Service / Unit	Rank	Date	Notes
Walton Walker	United States Army	Lieutenant General	1950-12-19	
Walton Walker	United States Army	General	1953-01-03	
Edward Almond	United States Army	Major General	1950-12-25	
Edward Almond	United States Army	Lieutenant General	1953-01-03	
Kim Suk-won	Republic of Korea Army	Brigadier General	1950-12-30	
Oliver P. Smith	United States Marine Corps	Major General	1951-04-26	
Oliver P. Smith	United States Marine Corps	Major General	1953-01-03	
Dean Hess	United States Air Force	Lieutenant Colonel	1951-05-29	
Chae Byong-duk †	Republic of Korea Army	Lieutenant General	1952-05-20	
Alberto Ruiz Novoa	National Army of Colombia	Lieutenant Colonel	1953-06-24	
Edwin A. Doss	United States Air Force	Colonel	1954-01-29	
Kim Shin	Republic of Korea Air Force	Brigadier General	1954-10-01	
William Westmoreland	United States Army	Brigadier General	1954-11-05	
William Hamilton Shaw †	United States Navy	Captain	1956-09-22 (Note: 1956-09-22 on certificate document, 1956-09-21 on database)	
Homer Litzenberg	United States Marine Corps	Major General	1957-11-19	
Thomas H. Hewlett	United States Army Medical Corps	Colonel	1961-07-31	
Cornelius E. Ryan	United States Army	Major General	?	
Chesty Puller	United States Marine Corps	Lieutenant General	?	
William P. Yarborough	United States Army	Lieutenant General	1969-07-24	
Charles Hercules Green †	Australian Army	Lieutenant Colonel	2019-07-27	

=== Chungmu ===
Name	Service / Unit	Rank	Date	Notes
Lee Dae-yong	Republic of Korea Army	Captain	1950-12-30	
Lee Dae-yong	Republic of Korea Army	Military attaché	1972-04-10	
Han Moo-hyup	Republic of Korea Army	?	1951-10-04	
Han Moo-hyup	Republic of Korea Army	align="Center"| ?	1953-09-21	
Han Moo-hyup	Republic of Korea Army	Major General	1969-02-18	
A. G. Rangaraj	Indian Army, 60th Parachute Field Ambulance	Lieutenant Colonel	1951-08-21	
A. G. Rangaraj	Indian Army, 60th Parachute Field Ambulance	Lieutenant Colonel	1951-11-30	
James McDivitt	United States Air Force	Brigadier General	?	
Robert Busch	United States Army	SP 6	1959-09-01	
Clayton O. Totman	United States Marine Corps	Brigadier General	?	
Denis Earp SSA SD SM SOE	South African Air Force	Lieutenant General	1961-06-30	
Elmo Zumwalt	United States Navy	Admiral	1969-04-25	
John E. Morrison	United States Airforce	Major General	1966-06-20	
Narong Kittikachorn	Royal Thai Army	Colonel	1968	
Kriangkrai Attanand	Royal Thai Army	Field Marshal	2024-07-27	

=== Hwarang ===
Name	Service / Unit	Rank	Date	Notes
Walter C. Monegan Jr. †	United States Marine Corps	Private First Class	1954-04-12	
Hugh M. Elwood	United States Marine Corps	Lieutenant general	?	
Jack T. Bishoff	United States Navy	Captain	?	
William Geftman	United States Marine Corps	Lieutenant Colonel	?	
Wilbur F. Simlik	United States Marine Corps	Major General	1970-04-10	
Phan Hòa Hiệp	Army of the Republic of Vietnam	Colonel	1971-01-29	

=== Inheon ===
Name	Service / Unit	Rank	Date	Notes
Ji Man-won	Republic of Korea Army	Captain	1970-11-13	
Yoon Jang-ho	Republic of Korea Army	Staff Sergeant	2007-03-01	
Robert E Highlands	U.S. Army	Major	1969-02-23	

== See also ==
- Orders, decorations, and medals of South Korea
- "Official Database of Awards". Government of South Korea.
