= Czechoslovak War Cross 1939 =

Czechoslovak War Cross 1939 Československý válečný kříž 1939 Československý vojnový kríž 1939
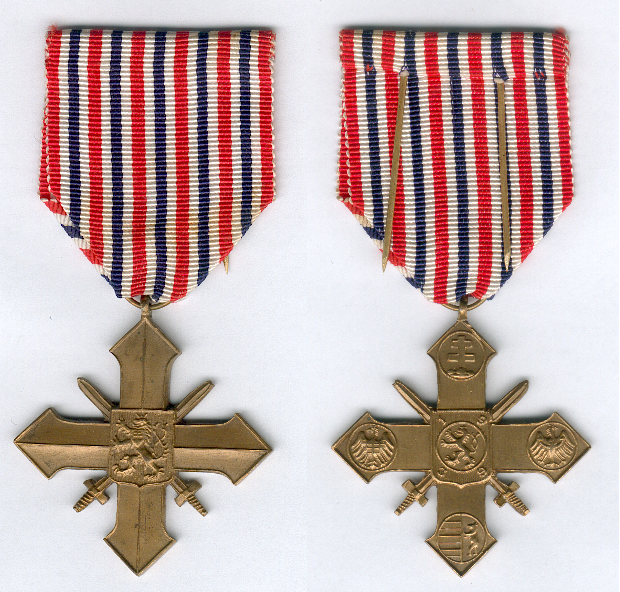
- The medals obverse (left) and reverse (right).
- Type: Chest order
- Awarded for: Awarded to all Czechoslovak citizens, units, and members of armies abroad, units and members of allied armies, that excelled in combat against fascism during World War II.
- Presented by: Czechoslovakia
- Eligibility: Military personnel
- Campaign: World War II
- Established: 20 December 1940
- Czechoslovak War Cross 1939 Ribbon

The Czechoslovak War Cross 1939 (Czech: Československý válečný kříž 1939, Slovak: Československý vojnový kríž 1939) is a military decoration of the former state of Czechoslovakia which was issued for those who had provided great service to the Czechoslovak state (in exile) during the years of World War II.

== Description ==
On 20 December 1940, the Czechoslovak government in exile in London ordered the creation of a second version of the Czechoslovak War Cross. It was created and issued not as a general service medal, but as a meritorious decoration for those had provided great service to the Czechoslovak state during the years of World War II. The award was mainly intended for persons who had helped liberate Czechoslovakia from the rule of Nazi Germany. Several American officers received the award, such as Dwight D. Eisenhower or George S. Patton, and the decoration was also bestowed to national heroes, such as the men who had assassinated Reinhard Heydrich in operation Anthropoid.

The second Czechoslovak War Cross was known as the Czechoslovak War Cross 1939 and a common phrase for the decoration was also the Czechoslovak Croix de Guerre. In cases where an individual had received both the World War I and World War II versions, both medals could be worn simultaneously.

The validity of the War Cross was confirmed after the end of World War II, in January 1946.

There were no further versions of the Czechoslovak War Cross after 1945 and the medal became obsolete with the division of the Czechoslovak state in 1992.

== Design ==
The medal was dye-struck and high in detail, with a bronze finish. On the obverse of the cross there was the lesser coat of arms of Czechoslovakia, on the reverse – symbols of the three historical Czech lands and two other adjoined lands in circles: symbol of Bohemia proper in the middle, Slovakia above, Moravia on the left, Silesia on the right, and Subcarpathian Rus' below. In the spaces around the middle circle, the year 1939 is spread. The medal was suspended from a white ribbon with red and blue stripes.

== Notable recipients ==
- Clift Andrus
- Omar Bradley
- Aaron Bradshaw Jr.
- Pierre Brossolette
- Emil Boček
- Albert E. Brown
- Alexandru Dobriceanu
- Dwight D. Eisenhower
- Jozef Gabčík
- Creighton Abrams
- Philip De Witt Ginder
- John M. Devine
- Neville Duke
- Barksdale Hamlett
- Karel Janoušek
- Geoffrey Keyes
- Karel Klapálek
- Jan Kubiš
- Jan Linhart
- Alois Liška
- František Moravec
- George S. Patton
- John L. Pierce
- Vernon Prichard
- Walter M. Robertson
- Cornelius E. Ryan
- William R. Schmidt
- Ludvík Svoboda
- George A. Taylor
- Alfred Woodhall
- Georgy Zhukov
- Nikita Brilev
- Rodion Malinovsky

== See also ==
- Czechoslovak War Cross 1918
