= Gordon Byrom Rogers =

United States Army general (1901–1967)

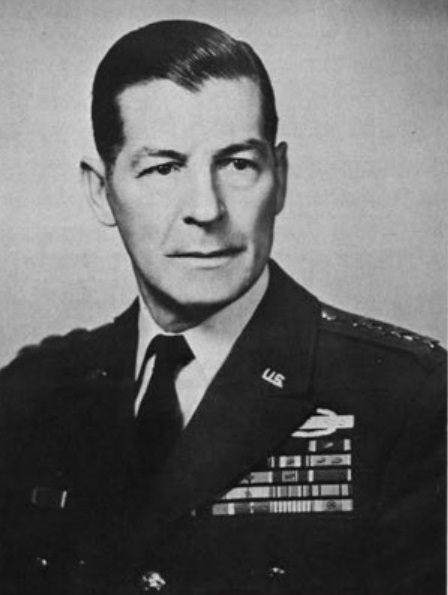
- Rogers as commander of US VII Corps, 1958. From the September–October 1967 edition of Armor magazine.
- Born: 22 August 1901; Manchester, Tennessee, US
- Died: 3 July 1967 (aged 65); Washington, DC, US
- Burial place: Arlington National Cemetery
- Relatives: Brigadier General Gordon B. Rogers Jr. (son)
- Military career
- Allegiance: United States
- Branch: United States Army
- Service years: 1924–1961
- Rank: Lieutenant General
- Commands: 3rd Cavalry Regiment; 12th Cavalry Regiment; 1st Brigade, 1st Cavalry Division; 5th Cavalry Regiment; United States Military Advisory Group to the Republic of Korea; 3rd Armored Division; Southern Area Command, West Germany; Seventh Army
- Conflicts: World War II; Korean War
- Awards: Distinguished Service Cross; Distinguished Service Medal; Silver Star; Legion of Merit; Purple Heart; Bronze Star Medal; Combat Infantryman's Badge
- Other work: Director, NATO Mutual Weapons Development Team

Gordon Byrom Rogers (22 August 1901 – 3 July 1967) was a United States Army lieutenant general who served in several command positions during World War II and the Korean War, including the United States Military Advisory Group to the Republic of Korea and the 3rd Armored Division.

== Early life ==
Rogers was born in Manchester, Tennessee. He attended the University of Tennessee for a year.

== Start of military career ==
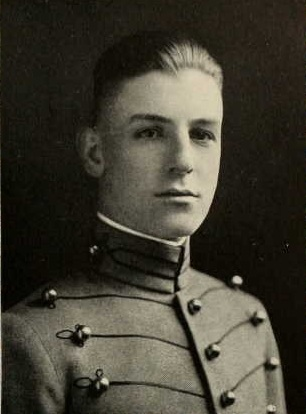
Rogers as a West Point Cadet. From the 1924 USMA Yearbook.

He graduated from the United States Military Academy in 1924, and was commissioned a second lieutenant of cavalry. After graduation, Rogers was assigned to the 1st Cavalry Regiment.

In 1929 he completed the Cavalry Officer Course and in 1930 he graduated from the Advanced Equitation Course, both at Fort Riley, Kansas.

For several years, Rogers played on the Army polo team. In 1930, he was a member of the U.S. Olympic Equestrian Team.

During the 1930s, Rogers served with the 10th and 2nd Cavalry Regiments.

In 1939, he graduated from the Army Command and General Staff College. He was then assigned to the 6th Cavalry at Fort Oglethorpe, Georgia, where he commanded a cavalry troop and then a cavalry squadron.

== World War II ==
In February 1942, he joined the 3rd Cavalry Regiment at Fort Benning, Georgia, and soon advanced to regimental commander. He was the final commander of the regiment as a horse cavalry formation, and in the summer of 1942 it fielded tanks and was reorganized as the 3rd Armored Regiment.

In July 1942, Rogers was named deputy chief of staff for intelligence, G-2 at I Corps, during training and mobilization in South Carolina, remaining with the corps during its move to Australia and subsequent combat in the Pacific Ocean Theater.

General Rogers was next assigned as G-2 for Army Ground Forces, serving in this post until September 1945.

== Post-World War II ==
After the war, Rogers was assigned to the War Department General Staff as chief of the Training Branch in the Office of the Director of Intelligence.

Beginning in September 1946, Rogers took part in the post-war occupation of Japan as commander of the 12th Cavalry Regiment and the 5th Cavalry Regiment.

In July 1949, Rogers was appointed director of intelligence for the Command and General Staff College.

Rogers graduated from the Army War College in 1951, afterwards remaining at the college as a member of the faculty and acting deputy commandant.

== Korean War ==
In June 1952, General Rogers went to Korea as assistant division commander of the 40th Infantry Division.

After briefly serving as deputy commander, in May 1953 Rogers was named commander of the United States Military Advisory Group to the Republic of Korea, where he served until October 1953. In this assignment, Rogers was responsible for providing training and logistics support to the Republic of Korea Army.

== Post-Korean War ==
Following that assignment, he was appointed commanding general of the 3rd Armored Division, based at Fort Knox, Kentucky. Under his command, the division was reorganized from a training unit to a deployable one and plans were made to relocate it to West Germany.

Following his division command, Rogers served in Munich, West Germany, as commander of the Southern Area Command and deputy commander of the Seventh Army. In 1958, he became commander of VII Corps.

From 1959 until his 1961 retirement, Rogers was deputy commander of the Continental Army Command at Fort Monroe, Virginia. In this position, he chaired the Army Aircraft Requirements Review Board (or Rogers Board), which made recommendations contained in the Army's long-term Aircraft Development Plan, as well as recommendations for the creation of air assault units.

== Post-military career ==
After his retirement from the Army General Rogers served as Director of the NATO Mutual Weapons Development Team.

== Awards and decorations ==
General Rogers' awards included: the Distinguished Service Cross (two awards); Distinguished Service Medal; Silver Star (two awards); Legion of Merit (three awards); Purple Heart; Bronze Star Medal (two awards); and Combat Infantryman's Badge.

== Retirement and death ==
In retirement, Rogers resided in Severna Park, Maryland. Rogers died at Walter Reed Hospital on July 3, 1967, and was buried with his wife at Arlington National Cemetery.

== Family ==
In 1934, Rogers married Mary Louise Watson (1910–1963) in Washington, DC. One of their children, Gordon Byrom Rogers Jr. (born October 21, 1934) graduated from the United States Military Academy in 1957. The younger Rogers was a career Army officer who served in the Vietnam War and attained the rank of brigadier general.

In 1964, Rogers married Mildred Montague Kimball at her ranch in Sedalia, Colorado.

== Other ==
In his memoir, David Hackworth cites Rogers as an example of Korean War senior officers who received undeserved awards for valor. According to Hackworth, Rogers received the Silver Star for nothing more than spending a short time at a forward command post while serving as assistant division commander of the 40th Infantry Division. Hackworth indicated that his perception of this incident led him to decide that the military's awards process had become devalued, and that senior officers should almost never be recommended for valor medals.
