= Echols, Kentucky =

Unincorporated community in Kentucky, United States

Echols
- Unincorporated community
- Location within the state of Kentucky Echols (the United States)
- Coordinates: 37°20′1″N 86°57′51″W
- Country: United States
- State: Kentucky
- County: Ohio
- Elevation: 531 ft (162 m)
- Time zone: UTC-6 (Central (CST))
  - Summer (DST): UTC-5 (CDT)
- GNIS feature ID: 507905

Echols is an unincorporated community and coal town located in Ohio County, Kentucky, United States. It was also known as Pink Hall.

The town extends north from Paradise, and also north from the Peabody Wildlife Management which used to be coal mines.

Echols was established as a coal town in 1874 and named for the mine owner.
