= Operation Rat Killer =

1951–1952 military operation in the Korean War

- Part of the Korean War
Date	December 1951 – February 1952
Location	Jirisan, Korea
Result	ROK victory, suppression of the guerrillas

Belligerents
South Korea; United States	Communist partisans

Commanders and leaders
Paik Sun Yup	Lee Hyun-sang

Strength
(South Korea) 11,000 (United States) 60	10,000

Casualties and losses
	5,800 killed, 5,700 captured

Operation Rat Killer was a Korean War operation carried out by Republic of Korea forces and United States advisers from December 1951 into February 1952. It was aimed at eradicating communist guerrilla forces operating in zones occupied by the United Nations forces. The operation involved two Korean Army divisions, the Capital Division and the 8th Division, several regiments of the Korean National Police, a ROKAF squadron of Mustang fighter-bombers, and about sixty United States experts. The operation was under the command of General Paik Sun Yup. The operation's particular priority was the mountainous area of Jirisan.

Before the operation, the guerrillas were allegedly responsible for harassing nearly a third of UN forces and conducting regular attacks on roads and railways used by them. After the operation, the guerrilla forces were greatly weakened, although a resurgence remained a threat until the end of the war.

== Background ==
In 1951, a large number of communist guerrilla groups, ranging in size from a few hundred to several thousand, were operating in territory supposedly controlled by UN forces and were attacking roads and railways, sniping at UN forces, and raising funds from local inhabitants. These guerrilla bands were particularly active in the Jirisan mountains, although sniping and guerrilla activity had been reported even in the capital, Seoul. Local anti-communist militias formed to fight back, sometimes engaging in savage reprisals against villages deemed to be supporting the guerrillas.

== Outcome ==
After the operation, communist guerrilla forces were greatly weakened, although thousands of Republic of Korea police had to remain in the area, supported by up to 11,000 local militia known as the Young Volunteers, in order to prevent the resurgence of the remaining guerrilla forces, who may have numbered about 3,000.

According to Republic of Korea records, 5,800 guerrilla fighters were killed and 5,700 were captured. U.S. records claim 9,000 guerrillas were killed, while some sources estimate as many as 10,000.
