= Bataan Rescue =

2003 television documentary film

- Genre: Documentary
- Written by: David Axelrod
- Directed by: Peter Jones
- Narrated by: Scott Glenn
- Music by: Mark Adler
- Country of origin: United States
- Original language: English

Production
- Producer: David Axelrod
- Cinematography: Brian McDairmant
- Editor: Kate Amend
- Running time: 60 minutes
- Production company: Green Umbrella

Original release
- Network: PBS
- Release: July 7, 2003

Bataan Rescue is a 2003 television documentary film about the Raid at Cabanatuan (Filipino: Pagsalakay sa Cabanatuan). Produced by PBS for the American Experience documentary program, it begins with the Fall of Bataan (Filipino: Pagsuko ng Bataan) in 1942 up to the titular event in January 1945, where more than 500 prisoners of war were liberated from a Japanese camp in Cabanatuan, Nueva Ecija. Directed by Peter Jones and written and produced by David Axelrod, the film first aired on PBS in the United States on July 7, 2003.

== Interviewees ==
- Malcolm Amos, U.S. Army
- Robert Anderson, 6th Ranger Battalion
- Bert Bank
- Richard Beck, POW
- Robert Body, U.S. Army
- John Cook, POW
- Patrick Ganio, Filipino veteran
- James Hildebrand, U.S. Army
- Forest Johnson, author
- Jose Juachon, Filipino veteran
- Robert Prince, 6th Ranger Battalion
- Leland Provencher, 6th Ranger Battalion
- John Richardson, 6th Ranger Battalion
- Francis Schilli, 6th Ranger Battalion
- Hampton Sides, author of Ghost Soldiers
- Edward "Tommie" Thomas, POW

== Critical response ==
The Oregonian gave Bataan Rescue a positive review, commending it as a "fairly balanced account, with Glenn reading the big picture and the veterans filling in the small, vivid and often ghastly details."

== Home media ==
Bataan Rescue was first released on VHS by PBS on July 29, 2003. PBS would later release the film on DVD by February 15, 2005.

== See also ==
- The Great Raid, a 2005 film about the rescue
