= Cabanatuan American Memorial =

World War II memorial in Nueva Ecija, Philippines

- American Battle Monuments Commission
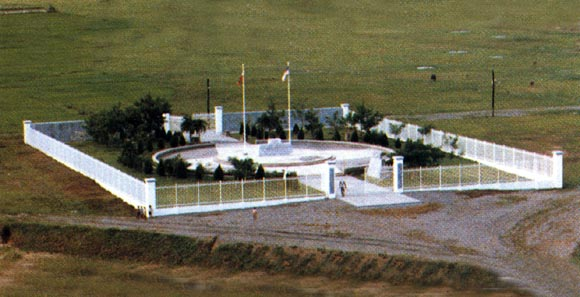
- Aerial view of the Cabanatuan American Memorial, ca. 2007
- For the commemoration of the dead of the Bataan Death March and the Cabanatuan Japanese POW camp
- Unveiled: April 12, 1982
- Location: 15.5110°N 121.0440°E; Cabanatuan, Nueva Ecija, Philippines
- Commemorated: 2,656

The Cabanatuan American Memorial is a World War II memorial located in Cabanatuan, Nueva Ecija in the Philippines. It is located on the site of what was once Camp Pangatian, a military training camp which operated for twenty years until it was converted into an internment camp for Allied prisoners of war during the Japanese occupation.

The memorial was dedicated on 12 April 1982 by the survivors of the Bataan Death March and the prisoner-of-war camp in Cabanatuan during World War II. The memorial has been maintained by the American Battle Grounds Commission since 1989. Prior to this, it was maintained by the American Battle Monuments Commission.

The memorial is located along the Cabanatuan-Palayan road in Barangay Pangatian, eight kilometers north of the city proper.

== History ==
Route of the Bataan Death March

After the surrender of 75,000 allied troops (12,000 Americans and 63,000 Filipinos) by General Edward King, Jr. to the Japanese forces during World War II, the American troops were forced to march 65 miles from Mariveles to San Fernando, with the march ending in Capas. This is now known as the Bataan Death March. Camp Pangatian was then used as a POW camp for the soldiers who survived the death march. Although this event occurred in 1942, no memorial was erected until 1982.

The Camp Pangatian P.O.W. camp was liberated in 1945 in an operation known as the most successful tactical rescue mission ever executed by the American military, the raid at Cabanatuan. They were aided by Filipino guerrillas who were fighting the Japanese. This tactical operation was depicted in the 2005 film The Great Raid. Although the Bataan Death March was a significant historical event, the establishment of its memorial in Cabanatuan was not mentioned in any major U.S. news outlet.

In 1982, the American Battle Monuments Commission wanted to honor those who died in the Bataan Death March. Because of good relationship with the Philippines, the Filipino government allowed construction to begin. President Ronald Reagan signed a joint resolution on 6 April 1982, which declared that April 12 be officially celebrated as, "American Salute to Cabanatuan Prisoner of War Memorial Day." The unveiling of the Cabanatuan memorial, however, was not of much significance to the Filipino people, as no major newspaper on the Philippines printed any information about the memorial or its dedication.

=== Memorial Wall ===
Although more than 20,000 U.S. and Allied servicemen and civilians were held in the Japanese internment camp, only 2,656 American names are inscribed on the wall. The names and ranks of the servicemen held in the camp are listed on the memorial walls with horizontal rows with regular Typeface and spacing, similar to the Vietnam Veterans Memorial. A marble altar rests in the center of its 90-square-foot (8.4 m^{2}) concrete base. A large mural of Filipino and American soldiers carrying each other in battle is present on the roof deck of the memorial. This elevated circular platform is the only place in Nueva Ecija where the American flag stands beside the Filipino flag.

The dedication, which is located on the back of the Cabanatuan sign, describes the memorial. It reads,

SITE OF THE JAPANESE PRISONER OF WAR CAMP 1942 TO 1945
THIS MEMORIAL HONORS
THE AMERICAN SERVICEMEN AND THE CIVILIANS
WHO DIED HERE AND GRATEFULLY ACKNOWLEDGES
THE EQUALLY HEROIC SACRIFICES
MADE BY FILIPINO SERVICEMEN AND CIVILIANS
IN A MUTUAL QUEST FOR HONOR, FREEDOM AND PEACE
IT ALSO REMINDS MANKIND OF MAN’S INHUMANITY
TO HIS FELLOWMAN

ERECTED AND DEDICATED 12 APRIL 1982 BY
AMERICAN AND FILIPINO COMRADES, FAMILIES AND FRIENDS.

=== Addition ===
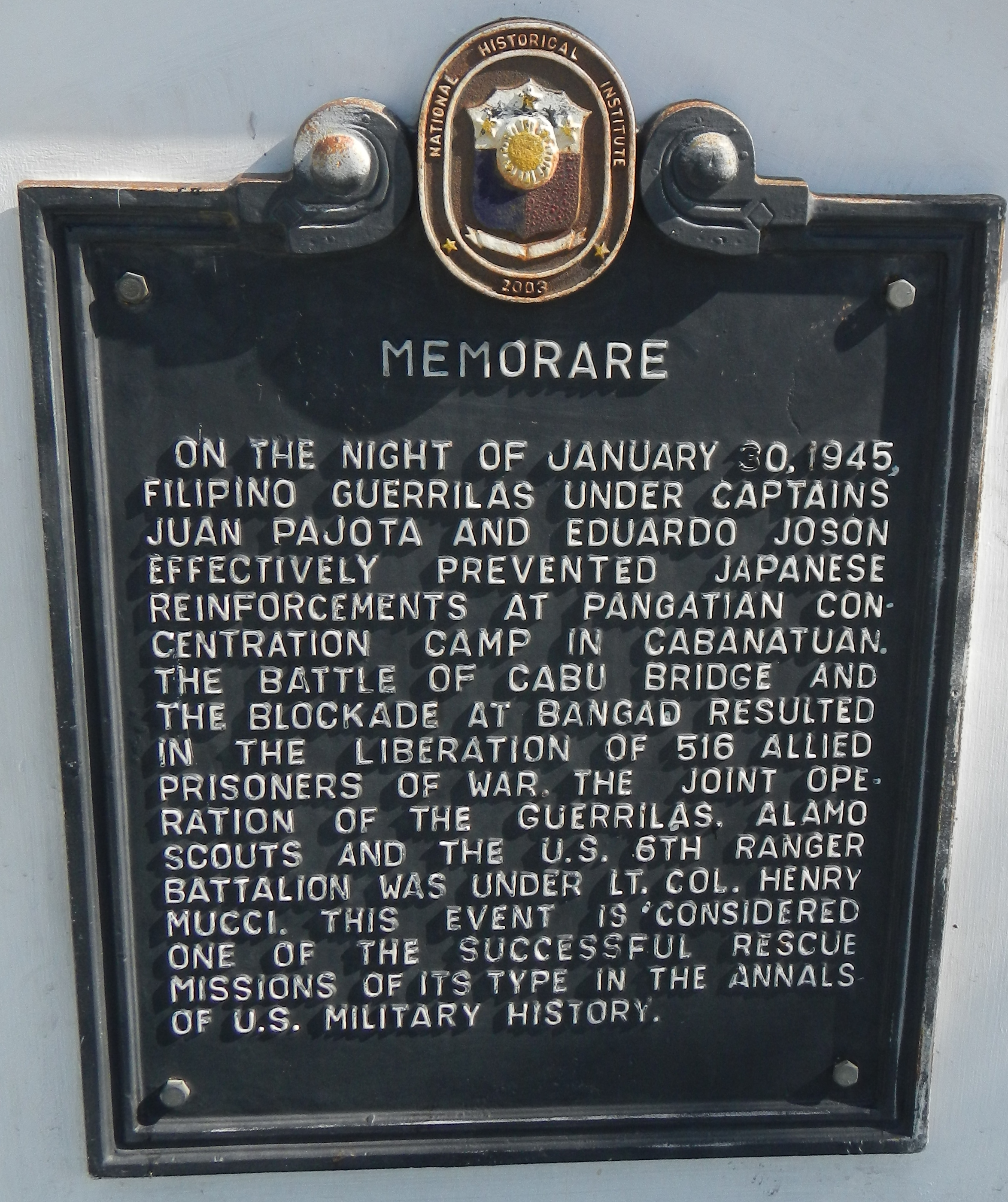
Raid at Cabanatuan Memorare English historical marker

On 6 April 2003, the provincial government of Nueva Ecija inaugurated a second memorial on a piece of land adjacent to the U.S.-maintained memorial. The original monument honors the heroism of the American prisoners of war in Pangatian. The second memorial, however, pays tribute to the Filipino guerrillas who helped in the liberation of Camp Pangatian. The addition features a circular platform with two tablets from the National Historical Institute. One of these tablets is in Filipino while the other is in English.

== Gallery ==
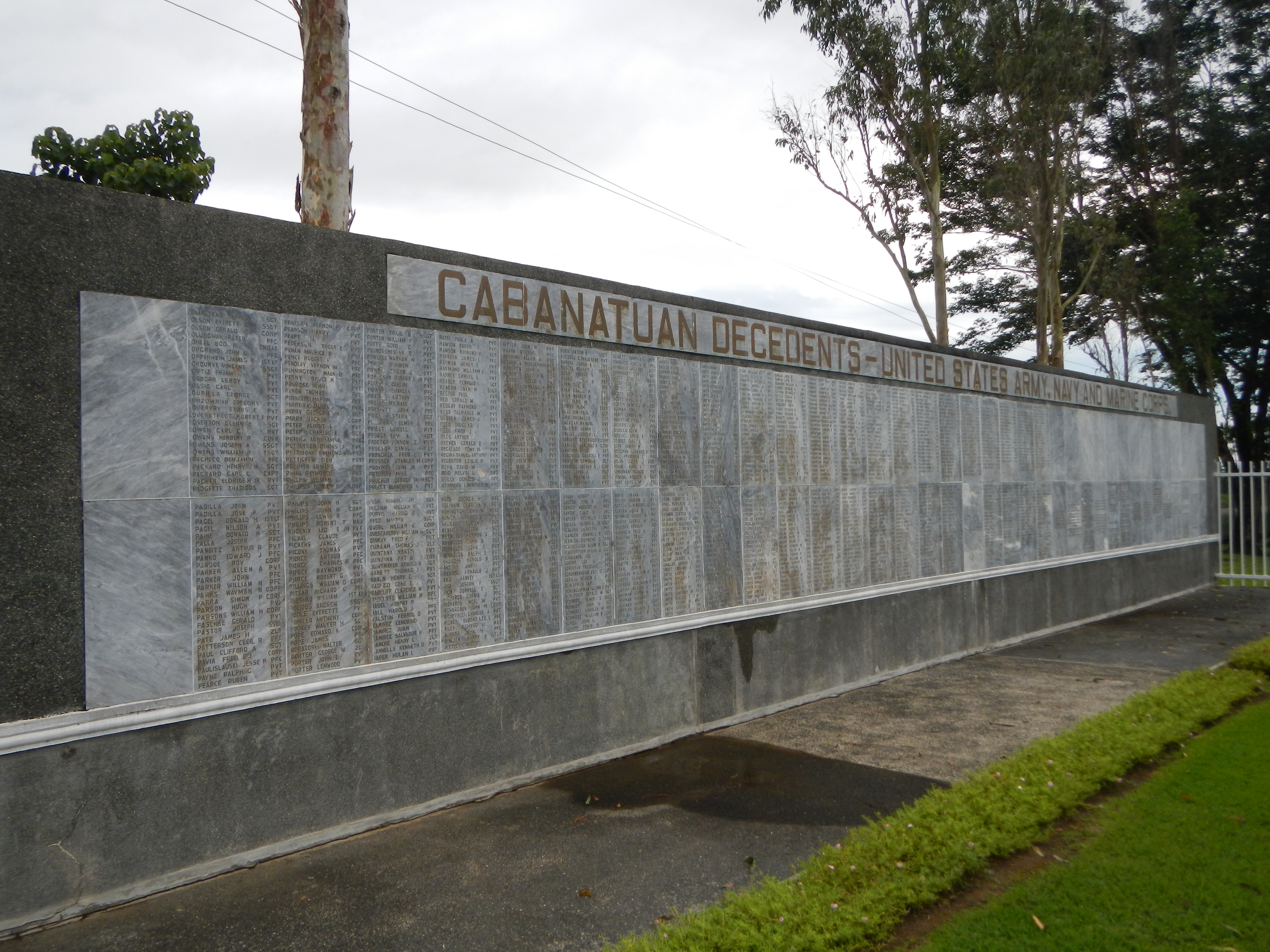
Names of the deceased listed on the Cabanatuan American Memorial shrine

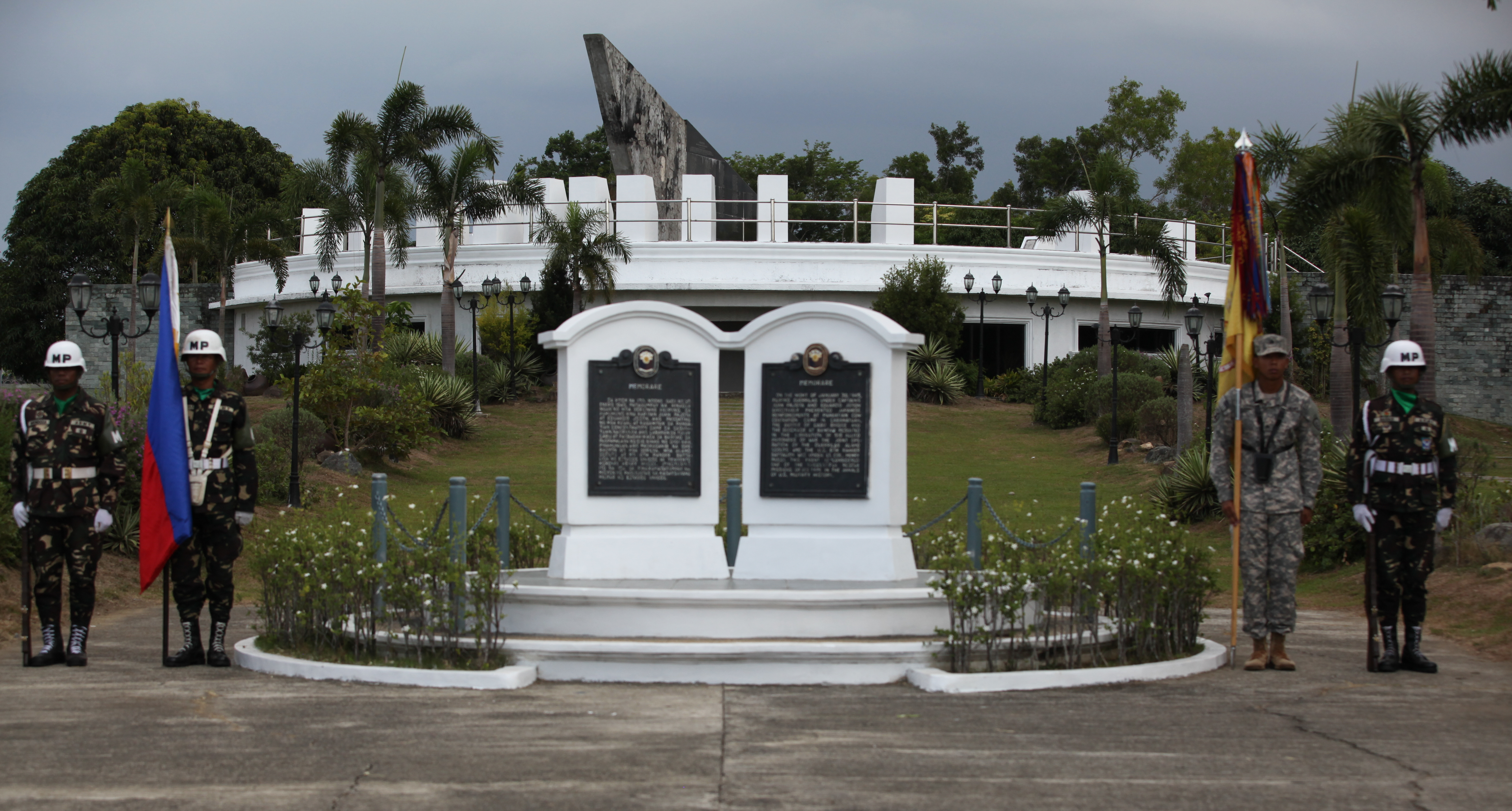
The second memorial
