= Robert Prince =

Robert Prince or Bob Prince may refer to:

- Bob Prince (1916–1985), American radio and television sportscaster and commentator
- Robert Prince (American football) (born 1965), American football coach
- Robert Prince (captain) (1919–2009), World War II officer
- Robert Prince (composer) (1929–2007), ballet and Broadway composer
- Bobby Prince (1945–2026), video game composer
- Bob Prince, (born 1955), middle-distance runner, winner of the 1976 880 yards at the NCAA Division I Indoor Track and Field Championships
