= Juan Pajota =

Filipino guerilla (c. 1914–1976)

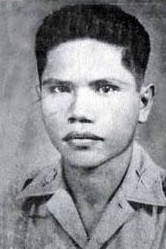
- Captain Juan Pajota in 1945
- Born: c. 1914; Nueva Ecija, Insular Government of the Philippine Islands, United States
- Died: December 20, 1976 (aged 61–62); Chicago, Illinois, U.S.
- Spouse: Juliana Francisco
- Military career
- Allegiance: United States; Philippines
- Branch: USAFFE; 45th Infantry Regiment; Philippine Scouts ,91st Div PA
- Service years: 1941–1946
- Rank: Captain (USAFFE)
- Conflicts: World War II; Philippine resistance; Philippines campaign; Raid at Cabanatuan
- Awards: Bronze Star

Captain Juan Pajota (c. 1914 – December 20, 1976) was involved in the Raid at Cabanatuan, an action which took place in the Philippines on January 30, 1945 by US Army Rangers and Filipino guerrillas and resulted in the liberation of more than 511 American prisoners of war (POWs) from a Japanese POW camp near Cabanatuan.

== World War II ==
He was trained in the 45th Inf. Philippine Scouts, with the rank of Lieutenant, assigned as an Instructor to the 91st Div. 92nd Inf., Philippine Army in May 1941. The 91st Div. 92nd Inf. was established on Samar and on September 12, 1941, they were transferred to Luzon and their training camp was near Cabanatuan. About December 20, they were ordered to assist the 26th Cavalry Philippine Scouts in Pampanga province and engaged in combat until the retreat to Bataan near the end of December. During the retreat, he and some others of the 91st were cut off by the Japanese and delayed getting into Bataan in January where they found their former training camp had been taken over by the Japanese. He and another member of the 45th Inf. Philippine Scouts, Maj. Robert Lapham, formed a guerrilla unit on the Luzon Central Plains, and Juan became a leader of this unit and promoted to captain. This unit included the remnant of the 91st who were with him and new recruits.

== Raid at Cabanatuan ==
The Raid at Cabanatuan was a rescue of Allied prisoners of war (POWs) and civilians from a Japanese camp near Cabanatuan, Philippines. On January 30, 1945, during World War II, United States Army Rangers, Alamo Scouts, and Filipino guerrillas liberated more than 511 from the POW camp.

Under the command of Captain (later promoted Major) Juan Pajota, who coordinated support, this force was responsible for the roadblock at the Cabu River bridge that totally destroyed the Japanese 359th Independent Infantry Battalion. Without the guerrilla's support it is unlikely that the raid would have been as successful or even succeeded at all.

=== Military tactics ===
His knowledge of the enemy's activity, the local people and terrain proved to be crucial to the rescue. His instructions to the local villagers to muzzle their dogs to quell barking at passing American troops was timely and prudent. His recommendation that the mission to be moved back 24 hours to Lt. Col. Henry A. Mucci due to heavy Japanese presence also proved quite prudent, as many of these troops ultimately left the area before the raid began. Another idea of Capt. Pajota was a flyover of an American plane to divert the enemy's attention and distract their attention while the troops were moving. His troops held back the advancing Japanese tanks and reinforcements and prevented them from crossing the Cabu Bridge to engaged the rescuers and POWs. He had procured about 50 carabaos (water buffalo) carts for a caravan that was used to transport the prisoners to friendly lines that saved the lives of prisoners.

== Later years ==
Juan Pajota left the Philippines and was brought to the United States by his friend and author, Forrest Bryant Johnson, who he had met while Mr. Johnson was researching for a book he wrote on the raid of Cabanatuan which was entitled The Hour of Redemption and originally published in 1977. It later was released in 2002 under Warner Books.

== Death ==
A former Dean of the College of Commerce in the Philippines, Juan Pajota came to the U.S., took a job with the Milwaukee Railroad to make ends meet and pursue his US citizenship goal in 1976. A year later while he was still waiting for his citizenship approval, he died of a heart attack a few days before his case was resolved.

== Popular culture ==
Captain Juan Pajota appeared as a character for the 2005 John Dahl film, The Great Raid. He was played by Filipino actor Cesar Montano.
