= Robert Prince (captain) =

United States Army officer

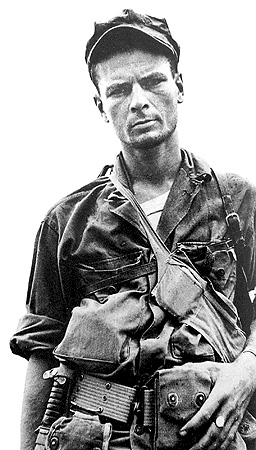
- Robert Prince
- Born: November 7, 1919; Seattle, Washington
- Died: January 1, 2009 (age 89); Port Townsend, Washington
- Military career
- Allegiance: United States of America
- Branch: United States Army
- Service years: 1941–1946
- Rank: Major
- Unit: 6th Ranger Battalion
- Conflicts: World War II
- Awards: Distinguished Service Cross

Robert W. Prince (November 7, 1919 – January 1, 2009) was an officer in the United States Army's elite 6th Ranger Battalion. In 1945 he was chosen personally by Lt. Col. Henry Mucci to plan the rescue at the Cabanatuan POW camp in the Philippines.

== Personal life ==
Prince was born in Seattle, Washington on November 7, 1919, and grew up in the Madrona neighborhood. He graduated from Garfield High School and Stanford University, studying history and economics. He was initiated in Sigma Chi fraternity at Stanford. Prince joined the Reserve Officers' Training Corps and was commissioned as a Second lieutenant in 1941. On January 31, 1942, he married Barbara Harrison at Seattle's Episcopal Church of the Epiphany.

Only a few months afterwards, Prince was sent to New Guinea to fight in the war against the Imperial Japanese Army. The fighting in New Guinea ended a week before his group arrived. Shortly afterwards, the US Army created the 6th Ranger Battalion with Lt. Colonel Mucci commanding. In January 1945, news spread of the "Kill-All" policy of the Japanese regarding their prisoners of war. Mucci was quickly ordered to form a team to rescue Allied prisoners at the Cabanatuan camp. After the successful raid in 1945, Prince left the Army as a Major the day before Thanksgiving 1946. Prince reunited with his wife and raised two sons. He settled in Wenatchee and ran an apple business. In his later years, he retired in Kirkland, WA, and, after the death of his wife in 2003, he moved to Port Townsend, WA to be closer to his son.

== Raid at Cabanatuan ==
Prince was mainly involved with the planning of the raid. He had to hastily create a plan using a low level of intelligence of the area. Prince built his plan around his two best weapons; surprise and confusion. One of his primary concerns was the flatness of the countryside, since the Rangers would have to crawl across an open field without being seen by the guards. At the suggestion of Juan Pajota, a Filipino guerrilla, Mucci arranged for the United States Army Air Forces (USAAF) to have a P-61 Black Widow night fighter buzz the camp while the men made their way across the field. It proved to be the biggest factor in achieving the element of surprise.

Prince was personally responsible for the rescue of approximately 500+ Bataan Death March survivors through his rescue plan and direct actions. The principles of this plan are still taught today at the United States Military Academy.

== Honors ==
Prince received the nation's second-highest award for valor, the Distinguished Service Cross, for his involvement in the raid. In the late 1990s, he was added to the Army Ranger Hall of Fame. The Raid at Cabanatuan was depicted in the 1945 film Back to Bataan and the 2005 film The Great Raid which featured actor James Franco playing Prince.
