= The Great Raid (film) =

2005 American-Australian war film

- Theatrical poster
- Directed by: John Dahl
- Written by: Carlo Bernard; Doug Miro
- Based on: The Great Raid on Cabanatuan by: William Breuer; Ghost Soldiers; by Hampton Sides
- Produced by: Lawrence Bender; Marty Katz
- Starring: Benjamin Bratt; James Franco; Connie Nielsen; Marton Csokas; Joseph Fiennes
- Cinematography: Peter Menzies Jr.
- Edited by: Scott Chestnut; Pietro Scalia
- Music by: Trevor Rabin
- Distributed by: Miramax Films
- Release date: August 12, 2005 (United States)
- Running time: 132 minutes
- Countries: United States; Australia; Philippines
- Languages: English; Japanese; Filipino
- Budget: $60–80 million
- Box office: $10.8 million

The Great Raid is a 2005 internationally co-produced war film about the Raid at Cabanatuan on the island of Luzon, Philippines during World War II. Directed by John Dahl, the film stars Benjamin Bratt, James Franco, Connie Nielsen, Marton Csokas, Joseph Fiennes with Motoki Kobayashi and Cesar Montano. It showcases the efforts of American soldiers and the Filipino resistance guerrilla, rescuing Allied prisoners of war from a Japanese POW camp.

Filming took place from July to November 2002, but its release was delayed several times from the original target of fall 2003. It received mixed reviews from critics, and was a commercial failure, having grossed only $10.8 million against a production budget of $60–80 million.

== Plot ==
In December 1944, the Kempeitai massacred prisoners of war on Palawan. By 1945, American forces are closing in on the Japanese-occupied Philippines. The Japanese hold over 500 American prisoners who had survived the Bataan Death March in a notorious POW camp near Cabanatuan and subjected them to brutal treatment and summary execution, as the Japanese code of bushido viewed surrender as a disgrace.

At Lingayen Gulf, the 6th Ranger Battalion under Lieutenant Colonel Henry Mucci is ordered by Lieutenant General Walter Krueger to liberate all of the POWs at Cabanatuan prison camp before they are killed by the Japanese. Mucci selects Captain Robert Prince and his company of Rangers for the raid. Prince is also tapped to form a plan and lead the rescue. At the Cabanatuan prison camp, the senior officer of the POWs Major Daniel Gibson struggles with malaria, and the prisoners are subjected to forced labor and malnutrition by the Kempeitai.

Nurse Margaret Utinsky, who had established a relationship with Gibson prior to the Japanese occupation, assists in smuggling medicine into the POW camp with the aid of the Filipino underground movement. The Kempeitai arrests her and sends her to Fort Santiago prison for torture and interrogation. She is eventually released when the Kempeitai discovers her Filipino accomplices in the underground movement and executes them.

On the way to the camp, the Rangers meet up with Captain Juan Pajota and the Filipino guerillas. Prince devises a plan where the guerillas cut off the telephone lines to Cabanatuan as well as distract and ambush a nearby battalion of the Imperial Japanese Army to prevent reinforcements from reaching the POW camp as the Rangers proceed with the raid. The Rangers succeed in carrying out the raid, catching the Kempeitai by surprise and killing all the camp guards, while the guerillas inflict heavy casualties on the Japanese battalion.

The Rangers rescue all the remaining prisoners and rendezvous with the guerillas at a small village called Platero. Both groups reach the American frontline in Talavera, where Gibson succumbs to his illness before he could reunite with Utinsky. Utinsky is later awarded the Medal of Freedom by President Harry S. Truman, while Mucci and Prince are awarded the Distinguished Service Cross for valor and the success of the raid.

== Cast ==
- Benjamin Bratt as Lieutenant Colonel Henry Mucci
- James Franco as Captain Robert Prince
- Connie Nielsen as Margaret Utinsky
- Marton Csokas as Captain Redding
- Joseph Fiennes as Major Daniel Gibson
- Mark Consuelos as Corporal Guttierez
- Max Martini as 1st Sergeant Sid "Top" Wojo
- Logan Marshall-Green as Lieutenant Paul Colvin
- Robert Mammone as Captain Jimmy Fisher
- Cesar Montano as Captain Juan Pajota
- James Carpinello as Corporal Aliteri
- Clayne Crawford as Corporal Alridge
- Craig McLachlan as Lieutenant Riley
- Sam Worthington as Private First Class Lucas
- Kenny Doughty as Pitt
- Natalie Mendoza as Mina
- Paolo Montalban as Sergeant Valera
- Leon Ford as American POW at Palawan
- Masa Yamaguchi as Lieutenant Hikobe (Japanese: 陸軍中尉彦部, Rikugun-Chūi Hikobe)
- Paul Nakauchi as Sergeant Shigeno (Japanese: 茂野軍曹, Shigeno Gunsō)
- Motoki Kobayashi as Major Nagai (Japanese: 陸軍少佐永井, Rikugun-Shōsa Nagai)
- Laird Macintosh as Lieutenant O'Grady
- Jeremy Callaghan as Lieutenant Able
- Dale Dye as Lieutenant General Walter Krueger
- Brett Tucker as Major Robert Lapham
- Eugenia Yuan as Cora
- Nicholas Bell as Duke
- Jerome Ehlers as Colonel H. White
- Kristian Schmid as Corporal Lee

== Production ==
The Americans used a Northrop P-61 Black Widow night fighter to divert Japanese attention while the Rangers were crawling toward the camp. The aircraft used in the movie was a Lockheed Hudson, because none of the four surviving P-61s were airworthy when the film was made. The movie was filmed in parts of Queensland, Australia, including Bribie Island. The Manila sequences were shot in Shanghai. Principal photography began in 2002 but it was pulled from its original 2003 release schedule on several occasions. It was finally released in August 2005, by Miramax Films, which coincided with the formal departure of co-founders Bob and Harvey Weinstein from the company. Director John Dahl had six hours of footage of Captain Robert Prince which he gave to actor James Franco to prepare for his role. Joseph Fiennes lost weight for his role as POW Major Daniel Gibson in the film. Retired Marine Corps captain Dale Dye was the film's military advisor and trained the cast in a boot camp in northern Queensland, reprising a role and practice from Band of Brothers, Saving Private Ryan and Platoon. James Franco wrote about the making of the movie in his novel Actors Anonymous.

== Reception ==
=== Critical response ===
On the review aggregator website Rotten Tomatoes, 39% of 119 critics' reviews are positive, with an average rating of 5.3/10. The website's consensus reads: "Though the climax of the film -- the actual raid -- is exciting, the rest of it is bogged down in too many subplots and runs on for too long." Metacritic, which uses a weighted average, assigned the film a score of 48 out of 100, based on 29 critics, indicating "mixed or average" reviews.

Wesley Morris of The Boston Globe criticized a lack of character development and the pace of the film, saying, "On screen, at least, the raid to free the prisoners isn't all that great – just a bunch of explosions and combat maneuvers. Still, it's the one sequence in the film where everybody works with the same conviction. The audience, meanwhile, has to sit around with the prisoners, waiting for this to happen. It's a long wait." He concluded that the film "amounts to a noble failure." Mike Clark of USA Today said, "Just about any golden age Hollywood hack could have made a zestier drama about one of the greatest rescue missions in U.S. military history," and criticized "Franco's droning voice-over" for spelling out "every sliver of historical context", and also said "a huge chunk of time is given to an uncompelling romance between a major...and a widowed nurse." Roger Ebert, writing for the Chicago Sun-Times gave it three stars, saying: "Here is a war movie that understands how wars are actually fought... [The film] has been made with the confidence that the story itself is the point, not the flashy graphics."
