= Robert Lapham =

United States Army officer (1917–2003)

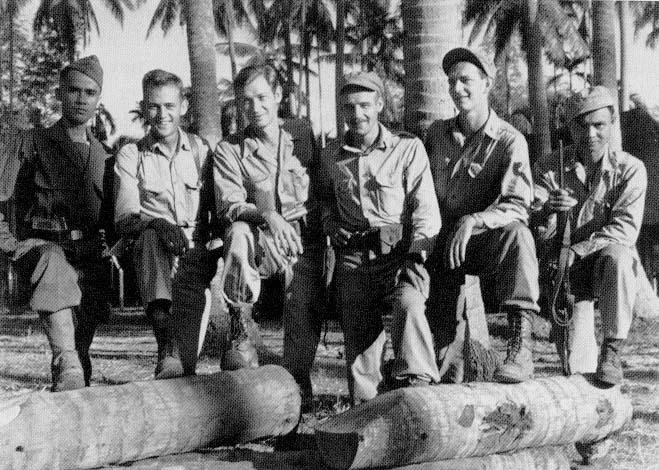
- Robert Lapham (third from left)
- Born: January 1, 1917; Davenport, Iowa, U.S.
- Died: December 18, 2003 (aged 86); Sun City, Arizona, U.S.
- Military career
- Allegiance: United States of America
- Branch: United States Army
- Service years: 1941–1945
- Rank: Major
- Unit: 45th Infantry Regiment (PS)
- Conflicts: World War II
- Awards: Distinguished Service Cross; Philippine Legion of Honor

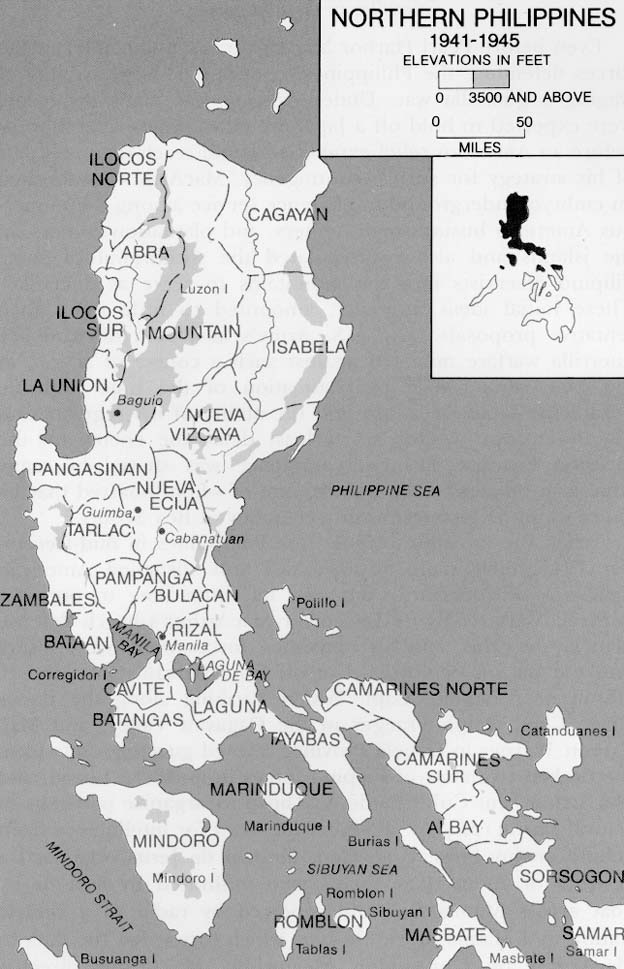
Lapham operated in the provinces of Pangasinan, Nueva Ecija, Tarlac, and Nueva Vizcaya.

Robert Lapham (January 1, 1917 – December 18, 2003) was a reserve lieutenant in the US Army in World War II. He served in the Philippines attached to the 45th Infantry (Philippine Scouts), evaded capture in the spring of 1942, and organized and led one of the largest and most successful guerrilla armies on the central plains of the northern island of Luzon. He was promoted to major by war's end, age 28, and was awarded the Distinguished Service Cross by General Douglas MacArthur. Lapham was the third person, after President Franklin Delano Roosevelt and MacArthur, to receive the Philippine Legion of Honor. Historian Norling says that Laphams's Luzon Guerrilla Army Force (LGAF) was probably the most efficient of the many guerrilla armies on Luzon. The U.S. Guerrilla Affairs Division commended Lapham for having the best-disciplined guerrilla organization.

== Early life ==
A graduate of the University of Iowa in 1939 with an ROTC 2nd lieutenant's commission in the Army Reserve, Lapham worked for the Chicago branch of the Burroughs Corporation before signing up for active duty in May 1941. He volunteered to serve in the Philippines, arrived in Manila on June 25, 1941, and was stationed at Fort William McKinley.

== Escape from Bataan ==
After the successful Japanese attack on the Philippines on December 8, 1941, Lapham and his company, consisting of Filipino musicians and military policemen, withdrew along with other American military units to defensive positions on the Bataan Peninsula. Lapham joined Major Claude A. Thorp in organizing "a raiding party that would slip through Japanese lines", with the objective of sabotaging Clark Field, and gathering intelligence for General MacArthur. On January 27, 1942, along with Thorp and a dozen others, Lapham slipped through Japanese lines and headed north into the Zambales Mountains. They attacked a Japanese convoy near Olongapo, possibly killing several soldiers, but failing to capture food and supplies. They wandered through the mountains for a month, collecting lost American and Filipino soldiers and finally reaching Mount Pinatubo, where they established Camp Four or Camp Sanchez. The newly promoted Lieutenant Colonel Thorp established radio communication with Bataan. After the fall of Bataan on April 9, 1942, Thorp released his approximately one hundred men from following his orders, allowing them to surrender, stay or follow their own path.

== Becoming a guerrilla ==
Lapham and Sergeants Albert Short and Esteban Lumyeb, decided they would journey northward as they had heard rumors that Filipino resistance to the Japanese occupation was developing there. They made it to Lupao when Corregidor, the last American outpost in the Philippines, fell on May 6. Sergeant Estipona and several other soldiers belonging to the Philippine Scouts reported for duty there. Lapham left Short and Estipana there and went on with Lumyeb ten miles north to establish another camp in Umingan, Pangasinan. Lupao and Umingan would be his bases until the end of the war. By the end of May 1942, Lapham had 21 volunteers and Short had a similar number. Lapham's Luzon Guerrilla Army Force (LGAF) would later dominate the resistance to the Japanese in the northern Luzon central plain. In exchange for local support, Lapham promised that, to avoid Japanese reprisals, he would not fight near his bases and that he would control the bands of outlaws and former soldiers who were ravaging the area. Lapham credited the desire of Filipinos to resist the Japanese for making him decide to become a guerrilla leader. He said that only a few of the hundreds of American soldiers who escaped capture at Bataan became guerrillas. Most died or were killed or attempted to blend into Philippine society.

According to Lapham, "Most (but not all) of the guerrilla leaders who died in the war were killed or captured in its first year while we were all learning how to operate. Those of us who had managed to eliminate or chase off spies and collaborators, who had learned how to win the support and trust of civilians, who had succeeded in establishing effective spy systems of our own, who had learned when to hide out and when to show ourselves, and who had been lucky were still alive early in 1943—and most of us then made it to the end of the war." Among those killed was Albert Short.

== Lapham as a leader ==
Lapham was not a professional soldier and in the beginning had little concept of how to fight a guerrilla war. He received little guidance from more experienced superiors with whom his communication was sporadic and difficult. The organization he created was substantially different from those created by more experienced soldiers such as Major Bernard L. Anderson and Col. Russell Volckmann who also operated in northern Luzon. Anderson and Volckmann established their bases in mountain redoubts, difficult to access and relatively safe from Japanese assault. By contrast, Lapham established his base on the densely populated central plains of Luzon. He said that it was much easier to obtain food and recruits on the plains than in more isolated areas. Lapham compared his role in his region of operation to that of a medieval aristocrat. The local people looked to him for a range of services in addition to his task of resistance to the Japanese. His instructions to his subordinates reflect the broad responsibilities he assumed. His "squadrons" were to "gather intelligence, harass the Japanese, catch fifth columnists and traitors, protect people from Japanese and bandit predation, treat civilians fairly and humanely, try to keep up the morale of all Filipinos, and behave yourself." His top priority initially was to suppress banditry, thereby winning the support and confidence of the local people. Like a medieval king, he was constantly on the move from place to place supervising his domain.

Lapham refused to submit to attempts by Volckmann to unite northern Luzon guerrilla units into a single command with Volckmann himself as the commander. Lapham's opinion was that the guerrilla units were scattered, communications were difficult, the guerrillas were too weak even in concert to take on the Japanese until near the end of the war, and that the challenges each guerrilla leader faced were different. Instructions dictated from a single leader would not be helpful. Ray C. Hunt, one of Lapham's commanders, refused to obey an order of Volckmann's and cast his lot with Lapham. The official U.S. Army historian also questions Volckmann's claim to command Lapham's guerrillas.)

Lapham was conscious of his image as a leader. He was clean shaven, attempted to dress neatly in semi-military clothing, and avoided liaisons with Filipina women. Not all his men followed his lead. Hunt dressed like a "bandit," saluted with his left hand, and had a Filipina mistress. Lapham expressed admiration for the same woman, a guerrilla named Herminia "Minanga" Dizon, and also admiration for Hunt. Hunt said that Lapham was reasonable, a fighter, and not ambitious.

== Luzon guerrilla ==
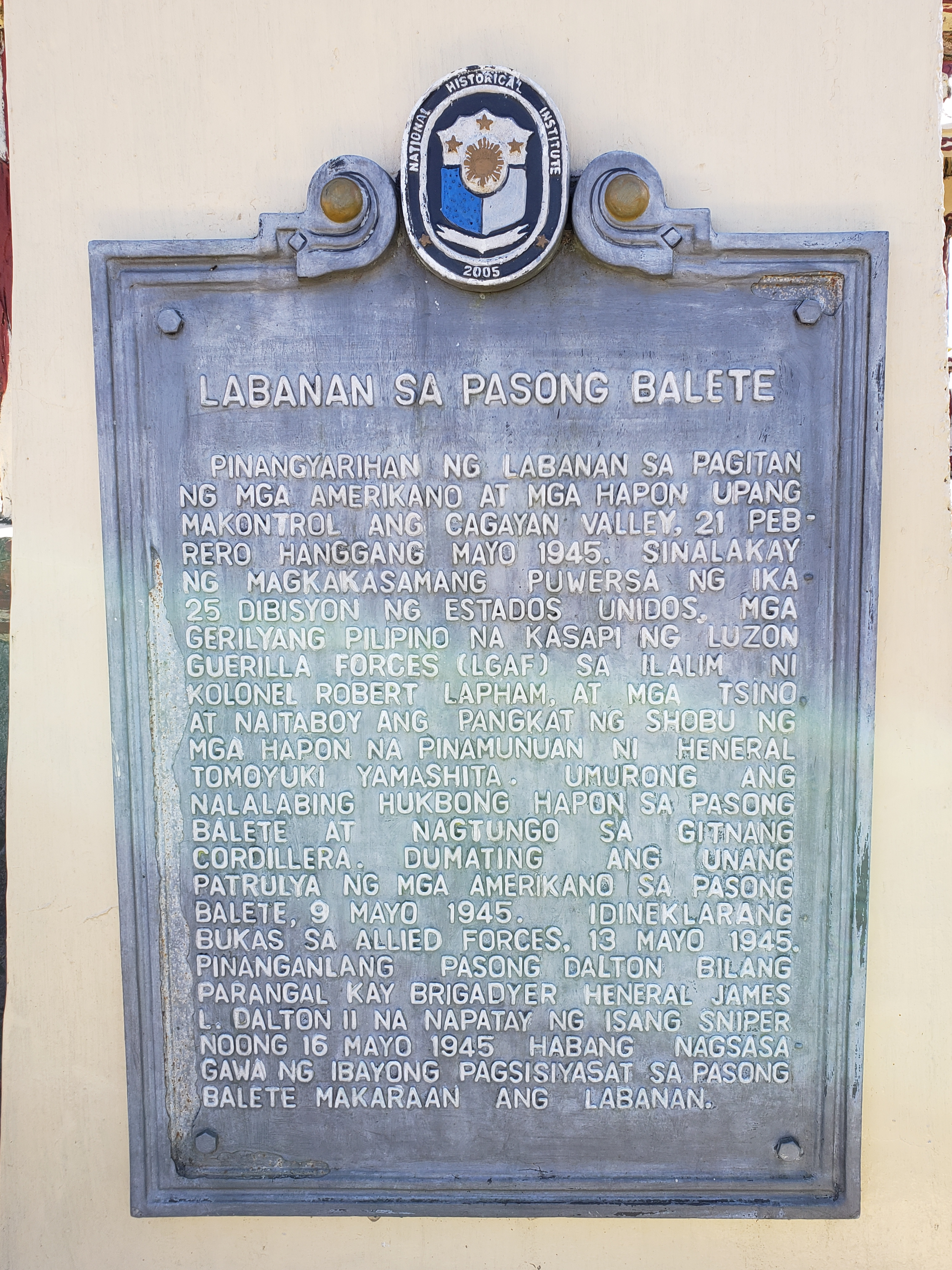
Philippine historical marker for Dalton Pass and the role of Lapham's LGAF in the battle

In 1943 and 1944, the estimated 13,000 Filipinos under Lapham's command in the Luzon Guerrilla Armed Forces (LGAF), engaged in "harassing the Japanese more than they had in 1942. This included 38 squadrons in Nueva Ecija under Captain Harry McKenzie, 15 in Pangasinan under Captain Ray C. Hunt, and six in Tarlac under Captain Al Hendrickson. He also had coast watcher units at Baler Bay, Caranglan and Pantabangan, and a combat unit of southwest Pampanga under the command of Emilio and Tony Hernandez. Lapham also managed to evacuate Captain Wilbur Lage and other Americans to Australia via submarine. In mid-1944, he received radio transmitters and started sending intelligence information to Australia. This was followed by his receipt of 30 tons of supplies from the USS Narwhal (SS-167) in August 1944, and another 20 tons from the USS Nautilus (SS-168) in October.

On January 4, 1945, his forces initiated four days of sabotage in support of the Battle of Luzon. On January 8 Lapham linked up with General Walter Krueger's US 6th Army. Lapham then formed the 1st Infantry Regiment, which was attached to the 25th Division on January 20.

== Raid at Cabanatuan ==
On January 26, 1945, Lapham made an emergency visit to U.S. forces near Lingayen Gulf, warning that the 513 American prisoners of war (POWs) in the Cabanatuan camp might be executed by the Japanese. The POWs, captured after the fall of Corregidor and Bataan in 1942, had not been shipped to Japan because they were considered too ill or unfit. Lapham was concerned the POWs would be executed before the camp could be liberated. His concerns were justified given the August 1944 Japanese War Ministry directive to commandants of POW camps outlining the final disposition of prisoners (known as the "August 1 Kill-All Order"), and the killing of 139 American POWs by the Japanese at Palawan on December 14, 1944. Lapham's efforts led to the Raid at Cabanatuan on January 30, 1945, by U.S. army Rangers, Alamo Scouts, and 400 of Lapham's guerrillas commanded by Eduardo Joson and Juan Pajota. The guerrillas guided the Rangers and set up roadblocks to prevent any Japanese reinforcements from reaching the camp. Pajota ambushed a relief mission of several hundred Japanese soldiers which was instrumental in ensuring a successful rescue.

=== After the war ===
Lapham left the Philippines to return to the U.S. in 1945 and left the army in 1946. He married Scharlott Junge and returned to his old job with Burroughs (later Unisys). In 1975, he retired as vice-president for industrial relations in Detroit.

In 1947, Lapham returned to the Philippines for five months as a consultant to the U.S. on the subject of compensation to Filipinos who had served as guerrillas during the war. He recognized 79 squadrons of guerrillas under his command with a total of 809 officers and 13,382 men. His command suffered 813 recognized casualties. However, sorting out the deserving from the fraudulent was difficult. Of more than a million claims for compensation in all the Philippines, only 260,000 were approved. Lapham believed that most of his men were treated fairly, but was critical of U.S. policy toward the Philippines after the war. "If ever there was an ally of American whom we ought to have treated with generosity after the war, it was the Philippines." He said the U.S. Congress was "niggardly" with the Philippines, providing less money for rebuilding than that spent in many other countries, putting conditions on Philippine independence that favored U.S. business and military interests, and backing corrupt Filipino politicians who protected American, rather than Filipino, interests.

Lapham's story in his 1996 book Lapham’s Raiders: Guerrillas in the Philippines 1942-1945 opened a controversy about former Filipino President Ferdinand Marcos's fraudulent claims about his guerrilla activities, heroism, valor and medals.

== See also ==
- List of American guerrillas in the Philippines
- Luis Taruc
- Juan Pajota
- Benigno Ramos
- KALIBAPI
- Philippine Constabulary
- Makapili
- Hunters ROTC
- Huks
