= Henry Mucci =

Colonel of the United States Army Rangers

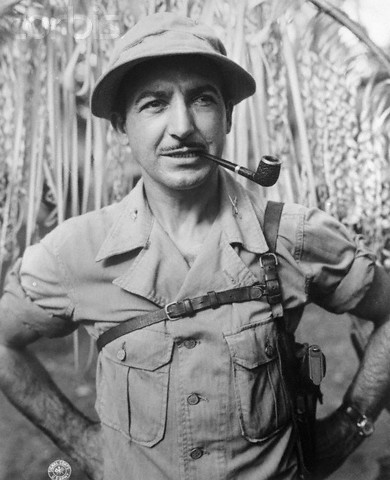
- Colonel Henry Mucci
- Born: Henry Andrews Mucci; March 4, 1909; Bridgeport, Connecticut
- Died: April 20, 1997 (aged 88); Melbourne, Florida
- Burial place: West Point Cemetery
- Military career
- Allegiance: United States
- Branch: United States Army
- Service years: 1929–1932, 1936–1947
- Rank: Colonel
- Commands: 6th Ranger Battalion
- Conflicts: World War II: Battle of Pearl Harbor; Second Battle of the Philippines; Raid at Cabanatuan
- Awards: Distinguished Service Cross; Silver Star; Legion of Merit; Soldier's Medal; Bronze Star (2); Purple Heart; Army Commendation Medal; Presidential Unit Citation

Henry Andrews Mucci (March 4, 1909 – April 20, 1997) was a colonel in the United States Army Rangers. In January 1945, during World War II, he led a force of 121 Army Rangers on a mission which rescued 513 survivors of the Bataan Death March from Cabanatuan Prison Camp, despite being heavily outnumbered. It is widely considered the most successful rescue mission in the history of the United States military.

== Youth ==
Mucci was born in Bridgeport, Connecticut, to parents who had emigrated from Sicily, Italy.

Today, a section of the United States Embassy in Rome, Italy, is named in Mucci's honor.

Henry came from a family of 10 siblings. Two of his brothers also served in the Army and Navy during the Second World War, while his sisters worked at the Veterans of Foreign Wars in America and made bazookas in factories.

He enrolled at the United States Military Academy in West Point, New York, graduating 246th of 275 in his class in May 1936. While at West Point he participated in lacrosse and, due to his early years growing up with horses, was on the equestrian team.

== Military service ==
Before entering the Military Academy, Mucci served as an enlisted soldier in the Army from December 1929 to June 1932.

=== World War II ===
Mucci survived the attack on Pearl Harbor on December 7, 1941.

In February 1943, the US Sixth Army put Mucci in charge of the 98th Field Artillery Battalion, previously a mule-drawn pack artillery unit. Mucci announced that the Battalion was being converted from Field Artillery to Rangers, downsized the battalion from 1,000 men to 500, and held a training camp in New Guinea where he utilized commando type training techniques for over a year. Thus, Mucci created the new 6th Ranger Battalion.

In March 1943, Mucci was observing an amphibious landing training exercise from the shore. One of the landing craft broke down about a quarter mile offshore and the embarked soldiers were ordered to swim ashore. One of the privates could not swim without the aid of his life preserver. He was making such slow progress that both his clothing and life preserver became waterlogged and he began to sink. Without pausing to strip off his own clothing, Mucci swam out and rescued the man. He was subsequently awarded the Soldier's Medal.

During the liberation of the Philippines, General Walter Kreuger and one of his staff officers, Col. Horton White (6th Army Group's G-2), chose Mucci to head the liberation of the Cabanatuan Prison Camp due to both the difficulty and the peculiar needs of such a mission.

In January 1945, Mucci led 120 Army Rangers in liberating the Cabanatuan Prison Camp with the loss of only two men killed in action. The raid was supported by some 250 Filipino guerrillas, many of whom were unarmed, who guided the Rangers through Japanese held territory and held off Japanese reinforcements while the American Rangers freed the POWs.

For Mucci's actions in the raid he was personally awarded the Distinguished Service Cross by General of the Army Douglas MacArthur.

== Postwar life ==
Mucci returned home as a national hero in his home town of Bridgeport, Connecticut. He remained on active duty until April 30, 1947.

On September 2, 1941, he had married Marion Fountain (January 26, 1920 – July 8, 1994) at Saint Augustine by the Sea Catholic Church in Waikiki. They had three children.

In 1946, Mucci took leave to run for Congress as a Democrat in Connecticut's 4th district to replace the retiring Clare Boothe Luce, but he was defeated by future governor and ambassador John Davis Lodge. After resigning his commission, he became the President of Bridgeport Lincoln Mercury as well as becoming an oil representative in India.

In November 1974, the portion of Route 25 between Bridgeport and Newtown was named the Col. Henry A. Mucci Highway.

Colonel Mucci died at age 88 in Melbourne, Florida, on April 20, 1997, as the result of a stroke, being a complication of a fractured hip sustained at age 86, while swimming in rough surf near his home. He was interred next to his wife Marian at the West Point Cemetery on May 5, 1997.

The raid on Cabanatuan was depicted in the 2005 film The Great Raid, which featured actor Benjamin Bratt depicting Mucci, Bratt bearing a remarkable facial resemblance to Mucci.

== Military decorations and awards ==
=== Distinguished Service Cross ===
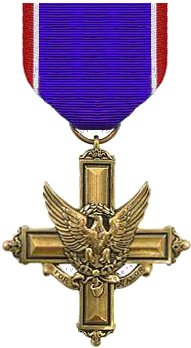

Citation:

The President of the United States of America, authorized by Act of Congress, July 9, 1918, takes pleasure in presenting the Distinguished Service Cross to Lieutenant Colonel (Infantry) Henry Andrews Mucci (ASN: 0-20374), United States Army, for extraordinary heroism in connection with military operations against an armed enemy while serving with the 6th Ranger Infantry Battalion, in action against enemy forces on 30 January 1945, during the rescue of Allied Prisoners of War from the Cabanatuan Prison Camp in the Philippine Islands. Colonel Mucci was charged with the rescue of several hundred Americans held prisoner by the enemy. It was believed that the enemy would kill or remove the prisoners when our attack was launched in that area. Colonel Mucci promptly assembled a rescue team composed of Ranger Infantry, Scouts, guerrillas and Filipino volunteers. On 28 January, he secured guides, and moved to rendezvous with the Scouts, who reported that three thousand enemy, with some tanks, were in the stockade area. He ordered the attack at dark on 30 January. The attack was launched, and within five minutes the Rangers and Scouts entered the camp, and killed the guards. Ten minutes later all prisoners were out of the camp, and were being taken to carts previously assembled. En route, our troops encountered a force about eight hundred enemy, attacked and killed three hundred. Eight enemy tanks attacking the convoy were held off by a quickly established roadblock. The convoy proceeded through the enemy-held area and completed the evacuation of the released prisoners. Colonel Mucci's gallant leadership, superior professional ability and outstanding personal courage contributed immeasurably to the brilliantly executed rescue of American imprisoned by the enemy. Lieutenant Colonel Mucci's intrepid leadership, personal bravery and zealous devotion to duty exemplify the highest traditions of the military forces of the United States and reflect great credit upon himself, his unit, and the United States Army.

=== Commendations ===
Henry Mucci received the following military awards:

| Badge | Combat Infantryman Badge | | |
| 1st Row | Distinguished Service Cross | | Silver Star |
| 2nd Row | Legion of Merit | Soldier's Medal | Bronze Star Medal with "V" device and oak leaf cluster |
| 3rd Row | Purple Heart | Army Commendation Medal | American Defense Service Medal with "Base" clasp |
| 4th Row | American Campaign Medal | Asiatic-Pacific Campaign Medal with four campaign stars and arrowhead device | World War II Victory Medal |
| 5th Row | Army of Occupation Medal | Distinguished Service Order (UK) | Philippine Liberation Medal with two stars |
