= 6th Ranger Battalion =

- WWII Ranger Battalions' shoulder sleeve insignia
- Active: 1942–1945
- Country: United States of America
- Branch: United States Army
- Type: Light infantry Special operations force
- Role: Direct action Jungle warfare Raiding; Reconnaissance; Special operations
- Size: Battalion
- Engagements: World War II: Battle of Leyte; Battle of Luzon; Raid at Cabanatuan

Commanders
- Notable commanders: Lt. Col. Henry Mucci

The 6th Ranger Battalion was a United States Army Ranger Battalion which saw action in the Pacific during World War II. The battalion is best known for its role in the Raid at Cabanatuan in the Philippines in January 1945.

== 98th Field Artillery Battalion ==
The 6th Rangers history begins with a mule-drawn pack artillery unit, the 98th Field Artillery Battalion. The 98th Field Artillery was formed at Camp Carson, Colorado in 1942 under the command of Lieutenant Colonel James M. Callicutt. In December 1942, the battalion embarked for Brisbane, Australia, but due to Australian animal importation laws, the battalion was redirected to New Guinea, arriving at Port Moresby on 17 February 1943.

The Battalion spent the next 12 months in training, but saw no combat. In February 1943, US Sixth Army decided that the battalion was obsolete, and removed the unit's 800 mules, as well as its commander, who was transferred to the 1st Cavalry Division. The battalion's new commander was Lieutenant Colonel Henry A. Mucci. The mules and some of the artillerymen and mule skinners were transferred to the 5307th Composite Unit (Provisional) in Burma,

== Ranger training ==
Mucci had led a training camp in Hawaii which used Ranger training techniques. He announced that the battalion was being converted from field artillery to Rangers, and downsized from 1,000 men to only 500. Some of the artillery officers were transferred out and replaced by infantry and engineer officers.

The task of conversion and training took over a year, but by July 1944 it was completed. The battalion was transferred to Finschhafen, New Guinea, where it was reorganized as a Ranger battalion and redesignated as the 6th Ranger Infantry Battalion.

== Philippines Campaign ==
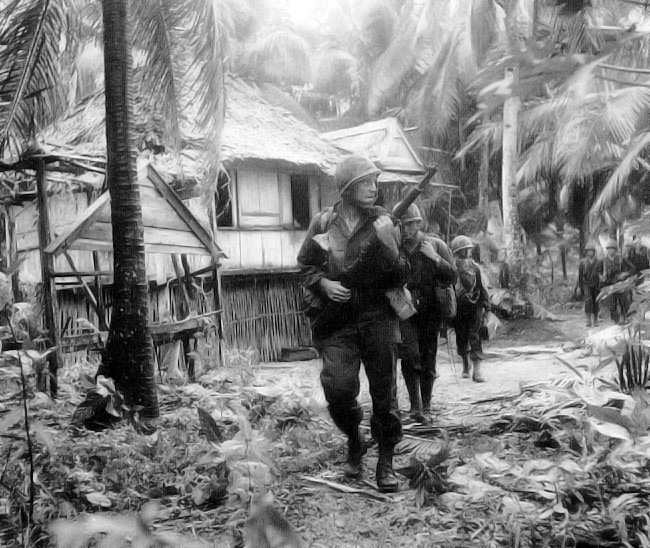
Soldiers of the 6th Ranger Battalion move through a village on Dinagat Island, 18 October 1944.

The 6th Rangers were to lead the invasion of the Philippines. The battalion left Finschhafen for Leyte in the Philippines on 10 October 1944. It was to secure the islands of Dinagat, Homonhon and Suluan, located in the entrance to Leyte Gulf. These islands had the potential to disrupt Sixth Army's landing operations if they remained in Japanese hands. After initial delays due to bad weather, the operation went ahead on 18 October, and was a success. The 6th Rangers on Dinagat raised the first American flag on Philippine soil as part of General Douglas MacArthur's 'Return to the Philippines'.

After the success of this mission, the invasion of Leyte got underway on 20 October 1944. The 6th Rangers were moved to Tacloban on Leyte, where they were mostly used for patrolling actions. Late in the year, the order came through for the battalion to prepare to take part in the landings in Lingayen Gulf, which were to form the invasion of Luzon. On 1 January 1945, the Rangers were transported by sea from Tacloban to Lingayen Gulf, and were landed on Lingayen Gulf Beach on 10 January 1945. Elements of the battalion were sent to Santiago Island to secure the entrance to the Gulf and prevent the enemy outflanking the landing area.

== Cabanatuan Raid ==
Sixth Army Intelligence indicated that the Japanese were holding a large number of American POWs in Cabanatuan, 60 miles north of Manila. An incident at a camp on Palawan led intelligence to believe that the POWs would be executed as the Imperial Japanese Army retreated. General Walter Krueger, Sixth Army commander, ordered 6th Rangers to "bring the prisoners out alive".

C Company, under Capt. Robert Prince, reinforced with a platoon from F Company and accompanied by Lt. Col. Mucci, was to undertake the mission. Alamo Scouts and Filipino guerrillas accompanied the 6th Ranger force, and provided reconnaissance and flank protection. The attack went ahead at dusk on 30 January. During the battle, the Rangers rescued 511 POWs and killed or wounded 523 enemy troops. Two Rangers were killed and two prisoners died during the evacuation, and 21 Filipino guerrillas were wounded. Both Mucci and Prince received the Distinguished Service Cross, all other officers involved in the raid the Silver Star and all enlisted men the Bronze Star. The operation is still considered one of the most successful rescue operations in US military history.

== After the raid ==
For the remainder of the Luzon campaign, the 6th Rangers performed a variety of small-scale missions, including long-range reconnaissance patrols, mopping up bypassed pockets of Japanese resistance, and serving as a headquarters guard for the Sixth Army. On 23 June, they seized an airfield near the town of Aparri to prepare for the arrival of Task Force Gypsy, comprising 11th Airborne Division paratroopers and glider troops. The Rangers then pushed south and linked up with the 37th Infantry Division, concluding their last major operation of the war.

After the war, the 6th Ranger Battalion was sent to Japan for occupation duties. The battalion was deactivated on 30 December 1945, and its members sent home or assigned to other units.

In 1986, the inactive 6th Ranger Infantry Battalion was consolidated with units of the 75th Infantry Regiment (Ranger) during its reorganization into the 75th Ranger Regiment.
