= Scott Cooper's unrealized projects =

During his career, American film director Scott Cooper has worked on a number of projects that never progressed beyond the pre-production stage under his direction. Some of these productions fell into development hell or were cancelled.

== 2010s ==
=== The Hatfields and the McCoys ===
As claimed by Robert Duvall in April 2010, Cooper had been in talks with him and Brad Pitt for a film about the infamous Hatfield/McCoy family feud. Eric Roth wrote the script, and Cooper collaborator T-Bone Burnett was signed to compose the soundtrack.

=== Brownsville Girl ===
In August 2010, it had been reported that Brad Pitt was offered a role in Cooper's Brownsville Girl, which was adapted by Jay Cocks from the song by Bob Dylan.

=== Tales from the Gangster Squad ===
In October 2010, it was reported that Warner Bros. had considered Cooper among several potential candidates to direct the then-titled Tales from the Gangster Squad. The film would later be released in 2013 under the title Gangster Squad, and directed by Ruben Fleischer.

=== Carancho remake ===
In November 2010, Cooper was reported to have signed on to direct an American remake of the Argentinian crime thriller Carancho as his next film, from a script by Aaron Stockard.

=== Empire of the Summer Moon ===
In December 2010, it was reported that author Larry McMurtry and Diana Ossana would be writing the Comanche drama the Empire of the Summer Moon for Cooper to direct. Adapted from the S. C. Gwynne book of the same title, the film was due to be produced by Scott Free Productions.

=== Unbroken ===
In January 2011, sources told Deadline Hollywood that

=== The Emperor's Children ===
On October 11, 2011, it was reported that Cooper would be directing a film of the Claire Messud novel The Emperor's Children, which had initially been set up as a directing vehicle for filmmaker Noah Baumbach the year prior. Working from Baumbach's adaptation, the film was predicted to begin production in the spring of 2012.

=== The Man in the Rockefeller Suit ===
On October 21, 2011, Deadline Hollywood announced that Cooper had a made deal to direct and possibly adapt The Man in the Rockefeller Suit, based on the nonfiction book about Christian Gerhartsreiter. Donald De Line was going to produce through De Line Pictures.

=== Lie Down in Darkness ===
In August 2012, Kristen Stewart was in talks to star in Cooper's planned adaptation of the 1951 William Styron novel Lie Down in Darkness. Cooper wrote the adapted script after completing Crazy Heart and had previously considered Jennifer Lawrence and Colin Firth for parts in the film. "When you're casting a family, all the elements have to come together perfectly and delicately," Cooper said of the project in 2013. "I'm in the process of talking to a number of actors and actresses," he added, denying Stewart's involvement as definite.

=== Creek ===
In February 2013, Warner Bros. acquired the rights to the then-to-be-published novel by Michael Armour, The Road Home, a Depression-era drama about a small town murder. Cooper signed on to write the script, direct, and co-produce with Jennifer Davisson Killoran and Leonardo DiCaprio, who was to star in the film. In May, the title was confirmed by Deadline to be Creek.

=== 36th Precinct remake ===
Cooper signed up in May 2013 to rewrite and direct 36th Precinct, a remake of the French film from 2004. Cooper's update was reportedly set in the NYPD's anti-terrorism unit, as opposed to the original's Banditry Repression Brigade in France.

=== The Stand ===
On August 23, 2013, Cooper replaced Ben Affleck as director of Stephen King's The Stand. In an interview with MTV held on November 20, Cooper teased the notion of Christian Bale taking on a role in the eventual feature. Later that day, Cooper exited the film, allegedly due to creative differences between him and the studio over the project's vision. Reflecting on his departure from the adaptation in 2014, Cooper said, "Yeah, I have moved on. It was a great process of connecting with Mr. King. It's a great piece, but it's a tough story to crack in one telling [...] if you're going to take something on like that, you want to make sure you get it right."

=== Only the Brave ===
In 2014, Cooper was announced as the director of a then-untitled feature film about the members of the Granite Mountain Hotshots firefighter crew who perished in the Yarnell Hill wildfire. Cooper eventually departed from the project, and its script was made into a film in 2017 by Joseph Kosinski.

=== American Wolf ===
In September 2015, TheWrap reported that Cooper was in talks to direct the film American Wolf, based on source material from Nate Blakeslee about the aftermath of a hunter who accidentally kills an endangered wolf in Yellowstone National Park.

=== White Knight ===
In November 2015, Cooper was in talks to rewrite and direct the international thriller White Knight for Warner Bros., which was being set up as a potential franchise in the vein of Jason Bourne and James Bond. Working from a script penned by Bill Dubuque, the story would have followed a disgraced Secret Service agent who takes up the job of protecting an arms dealer's family, putting him in the midst of a CIA manhunt.

=== Hellhound on His Trail ===
In 2017, Cooper was announced to direct his scripted adaptation of Hellhound on His Trail, dealing with the assassination of Martin Luther King Jr. and the subsequent manhunt of his killer. Black Label Media stepped up to produce and finance the adaptation, with a spring 2018 target for the start of production.

=== Valhalla ===
In 2019, John Lesher was reported to be producing a reteaming of Cooper and Christian Bale for a film called Valhalla, to be developed at Netflix. The film's plot was not revealed; however, in 2022, Cooper confirmed that he and Bale would eventually make the film.

=== Over Tumbled Graves ===
Cooper also had developed an adaptation of Jess Walter's noir novel Over Tumbled Graves for producer John Lesher and Cross Creek Pictures in 2019.

== 2020s ==
=== A Head Full of Ghosts ===
In February 2020, Cooper had been set to direct Margaret Qualley in the psychological horror film A Head Full of Ghosts, based on the horror novel by Paul Tremblay. Cooper has stated that the 2020 COVID-19 pandemic intervened in the project's development, but that he was pleased with how his script turned out. (Note: In 2023 Reddit AMA, when asked about the status of his adaptation of A Head Full of Ghosts, Cooper replied, "The pandemic intervened. I was very pleased with how the script turned out, and I love Margaret. She's a force.")

=== Angels and Demons TV miniseries ===
In October 2020, Cooper was reported to make his television debut with Angels & Demons. Set up as a limited series at Black Bear Television with Cooper writing and directing each episode, the series was to have been based on a Pulitzer Prize-winning article by Thomas French about the tragic murders of three women in Tampa Bay.

=== Untitled crime drama film ===
In June 2025, The Hollywood Reporter announced that after finishing Springsteen: Deliver Me from Nowhere, Cooper closed a deal to write, direct and produce an untitled crime drama for Amazon MGM Studios' United Artists as his next film. Though plot details remain vague, the project had been described as "a contemporary crime two-hander."

=== Comanche ===
In October 2025, Michael Mann revealed at the Lumière Festival that Cooper would direct his long-in-the-works Western film project, Comanche, co-written by Eric Roth. Mann was to take on a producer role for the project, which had been gestating since the 2000s.

=== Springsteen sequel ===
Also in October 2025, Cooper told Variety that there had been talks with Bruce Springsteen about making a follow-up to his biopic Deliver Me from Nowhere.

=== Untitled UFO conspiracy thriller ===
In 2026, Deadline reported that Cooper was teaming up once again with 20th Century Studios to write and direct a film based on the 1947 Roswell, New Mexico conspiracy in which a local rancher found debris relating to a possible UFO event.
