= Hampton Sides =

American author and historian

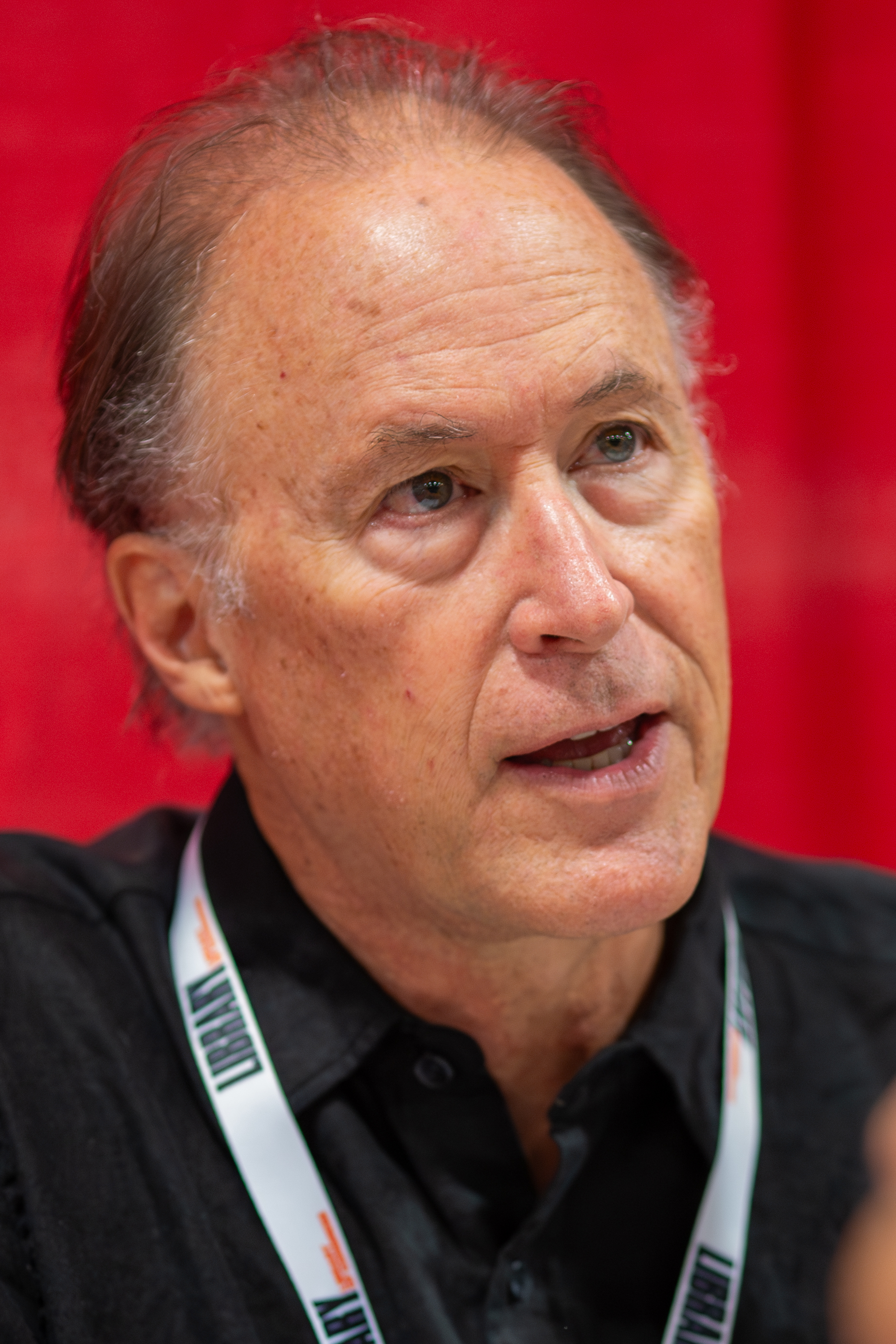
- Hampton Sides at the 2024 National Book Festival
- Born: Wade Hampton Sides; 1962 (age 63–64); Memphis, Tennessee, U.S.
- Education: Yale University (BA)
- Occupation: Historian/Author/Journalist
- Spouse: Anne Goodwin
- Children: 3 sons
- Writing career
- Pen name: W. Hampton Sides (formerly)
- Period: 2001–present
- Genres: Nonfiction, history, american history
- Notable works: Americana; Blood and Thunder; Ghost Soldiers; Hellhound on His Trail; In the Kingdom of Ice; The Wide Wide Sea

Wade Hampton Sides (born 1962) is an American historian, author and journalist. He is the author of Hellhound on His Trail, Ghost Soldiers, Blood and Thunder, On Desperate Ground, and other bestselling works of narrative history and literary non-fiction.

Sides is editor-at-large for Outside magazine and has written for such periodicals as National Geographic, The Wall Street Journal, The New Yorker, Esquire, Men's Journal, The American Scholar, Smithsonian, and The Washington Post. His magazine work, collected in numerous published anthologies, has been twice nominated for National Magazine Awards for feature writing.

== Early life ==
A native of Memphis, Tennessee, Sides attended PDS Memphis and Memphis University School, and graduated from Yale with a BA in history. In 2017, he was awarded an honorary doctorate in humane letters from Colorado College. Sides lives in Santa Fe, New Mexico, with his wife Anne Goodwin Sides, a journalist and former NPR editor.

== Career ==
Sides is a past fellow of the Santa Fe Institute, Yaddo, the MacDowell Colony, and the Japan Society, and has been an Edwards Media Fellow at Stanford University.

He is a member of the Society of American Historians and serves on the boards of the Authors Guild and the Mayborn Literary Nonfiction Conference. Sides has guest-lectured at Columbia, Yale, Stanford, Caltech, the Autry National Center of the American West, the American Embassy in Manila, the National World War II Museum, the Chautauqua Institution, the Explorers Club, the Sun Valley Writers' Conference, and the Google campus, among other venues and institutions. He has appeared as a guest on such national broadcasts as the American Experience, the Today show, Book TV, the History Channel, Fresh Air, CNN, CBS Sunday Morning, The Colbert Report, and NPR's All Things Considered.

== Books ==
=== Ghost Soldiers ===
Ghost Soldiers (Doubleday, 2001), a World War II narrative about the rescue of Bataan Death March survivors, has sold slightly over a million copies worldwide and has been translated into a dozen foreign languages. Erik Larson, author of The Devil in the White City, praised Ghost Soldiers as a "Great Escape for the Pacific Theater," and Esquire called it "the greatest World War II story never told." The book was the subject of documentaries on PBS and The History Channel, and was partially the basis for the 2005 Miramax film, The Great Raid (along with William Breuer's The Great Raid on Cabanatuan). Ghost Soldiers won the 2002 PEN USA Award for non-fiction and the Discover Award from Barnes & Noble. The book's success led Sides to create The Ghost Soldiers Endowment Fund, a non-profit foundation dedicated to preserving the memory of the sacrifices made by Bataan and Corregidor veterans by funding relevant archives, museums, and memorials.

=== Americana ===
Americana: Dispatches from the New Frontier is a 2004 collection of non-fiction essays. The book was published in paperback on April 13, 2004, through Doubleday. The book consists of several essays that Sides wrote while traveling through the United States and examining American cultures during a period of 15 years. Sides pays specific attention to subcultures that would fall under the topic of "Americana".

=== Blood and Thunder ===
Blood and Thunder (Doubleday, 2006) focuses on the life and times of controversial frontiersman Kit Carson, and his role in the conquest of the American West. A critic for the Los Angeles Times described Blood and Thunder as "stunning, haunting, and lyrical," while The Washington Post called it "riveting, monumental...authoritative and masterfully told." Blood and Thunder was named one of the 10 Best Books of 2006 by Time magazine, and was selected as that year's best history title by the History Book Club and the Western Writers of America. Blood and Thunder was the subject of a major documentary on the PBS program American Experience and is currently under development for the screen.

=== Hellhound on His Trail ===
Hellhound on His Trail (Doubleday 2010) is about the assassination of Martin Luther King Jr., and the largest manhunt in American history to capture James Earl Ray, who pleaded guilty in 1969 and served the rest of his life in prison. Sides, who is a native of Memphis, is the first historian to make use of a new digital archive in that city, called the B. Venson Hughes Collection, which contains more than 20,000 documents and photos, many of them rare or never before published. Sides' research forms much of the basis for PBS's documentary "Roads to Memphis", which originally aired May 3, 2010, on the award-winning program, American Experience.

Hellhound on His Trail reached #6 on The New York Times Best Seller list and was a finalist for the 2011 Edgar Awards as the year's best non-fiction mystery. Janet Maslin of The New York Times called the book "spellbinding...bold, dynamic, unusually vivid," while a reviewer in The New York Times Book Review suggested that Hellhound "may be the first book on King that owes less to Taylor Branch than Robert Ludlum." Time magazine said Hellhound "unfolds like a mystery—one read not for the ending but for all the missteps and near misses along the way." Critic Laura Miller, writing on Salon.com, described Hellhound as a "meticulous yet driving account that is in essence a true-crime story and a splendid specimen of the genre." David Garrow, author of a Pulitzer-winning biography of King, wrote in The Washington Post that Hellhound was "a carefully constructed true-crime narrative" and "a memorable and persuasive portrait" that "makes a valuable contribution to the historical record."

Black Label Media will produce and direct a film adaption, with a spring 2018 target for start of production. The script will be adapted by Scott Cooper who will also direct the film.

=== In the Kingdom of Ice ===
In the Kingdom of Ice (2014, Doubleday) recounts the tragic true story of the first official American attempt on the North Pole, the voyage of the USS Jeannette led by Navy captain George DeLong in 1879. Key historical figures in the book include James Gordon Bennett, Jr., owner of the New York Herald newspaper and financier, and August Heinrich Petermann, a German cartographer whose theory helped spawn the polar expedition.

The book has been translated into French, German, Chinese, Polish, and Russian, among other languages. Mark Bowden, author of Black Hawk Down, called In the Kingdom of Ice "the most dramatic polar mission you've never heard of. Once you start, you won't stop." S.C. Gwynne, author of Empire of the Summer Moon called it "an Arctic thriller . . . an authentic narrative masterpiece." Efforts to locate the wreck of the USS Jeannette have been led by the Prince Albert II of Monaco Foundation, for which Sides has served as a consultant. In the Kingdom of Ice is reportedly being developed for the small screen by Emmy Award-winning screenwriter Kirk Ellis (John Adams).

=== On Desperate Ground ===
On Desperate Ground: The Marines at The Reservoir, the Korean War's Greatest Battle, was published on October 2, 2018. It is a multifaceted retelling of the Battle of Chosin Reservoir through the experiences of marines, commanders, pilots, Korean citizens and the Chinese. It also acts an indictment of the overweening hubris of General of the Army, Douglas MacArthur. Through MacArthur's self-proclaimed expertise on the "Oriental mind" and what Sides referred to as MacArthur's "solemn regard for his own mind", MacArthur was thoroughly convinced of American victory; instead, and while completely ignoring the advice of leaders on the ground, MacArthur sent American troops into what could only result into a massacre. Historian Douglas Brinkley called the book "a heart-pounding, fiercely written . . . one of the finest battle books ever." A reviewer for Bloomberg, calling the book " superb," wrote that On Desperate Ground "should be required reading for negotiators on both sides of the DMZ." The Washington Post named On Desperate Ground one of the ten best books of 2018, and the Marine Corps Heritage Foundation named it the year's best non-fiction book.

Considerable parts of the narrative follow aviator Jesse L. Brown, who is also the subject of the 2022 film Devotion.

=== The Wide Wide Sea ===
The Wide Wide Sea: Imperial Ambition, First Contact and the Fateful Final Voyage of Captain James Cook was published in 2024.

== Selected journalism ==
- The New York Times Book Review; "On Dead Wake: The Last Crossing of the Lusitania by Erik Larson".
- National Geographic; "Science Seeks to Unlock Marijuana's Secret".
- National Geographic; "Unseen Titanic".
- National Geographic; "Russian Refuge".
- National Geographic; "1,000 Days in the Ice".
- Outside; "Tracing the Steps of Lost Explorers in Miserable, Beautiful Siberia".
- Outside; "The Man Who Saw Too Much".
- Outside; "Bear Grylls Plays Dirty".
- Outside; "Anyone for a Dip?".
- Outside; "The Birdman Drops In".
- Outside; "Wake-Up Call".
- Outside; "Quadzilla".
- Outside; The Place Where Two Fell Off.
- Men's Journal; "The First to Die".
- Bicycling; "Life's Rich Pageant".
- The Dallas Morning News; "Decades after assassinations, Memphis and Dallas remain hostages of history".
- The American Scholar; "Frozen Assets".
- Newsweek; "The Fall of Greg Mortensen and Our Longing for Heroes".
- The New Yorker; "National Defense".
- Garden & Gun; "City Portrait: Memphis, Tennessee".

== Bibliography ==
- Stomping Grounds: A Pilgrim's Progress Through Eight American Subcultures (1992) ISBN 0-688-09049-4 OCLC 26216643
- Ghost Soldiers: The Epic Account of World War II's Greatest Rescue Mission (2001) ISBN 0-385-49564-1 OCLC 45835493
- Why Moths Hate Thomas Edison and Other Urgent Inquiries into the Odd Nature of Nature: The Best of Outside Magazine's "The Wild File" New York: Norton, 2001. ISBN 0-393-32150-9 OCLC 45715852
- Americana: Dispatches from the New Frontier (2004) ISBN 1-400-03355-1 OCLC 53289674
- Blood and Thunder: An Epic of the American West (2006) ISBN 0-385-50777-1 OCLC 70045754
- Hellhound on His Trail: The Electrifying Account of the Largest Manhunt in American History. Doubleday, 2010. ISBN 0-385-52392-0 OCLC 458738471
- In the Kingdom of Ice: The Grand and Terrible Polar Voyage of the USS Jeannette. Doubleday. 2014. ISBN 9780385535380. OCLC 883257804.
- On Desperate Ground: The Marines at The Reservoir, the Korean War's Greatest Battle. Doubleday. 2018. ISBN 978-0385541152. OCLC 1099506789.
- The Wide Wide Sea: Imperial Ambition, First Contact and the Fateful Final Voyage of Captain James Cook. Doubleday. 2024. ISBN 978-0385544764. OCLC 1416012934.
