= Stonewall Jackson's arm =

Amputated limb of the Confederate general

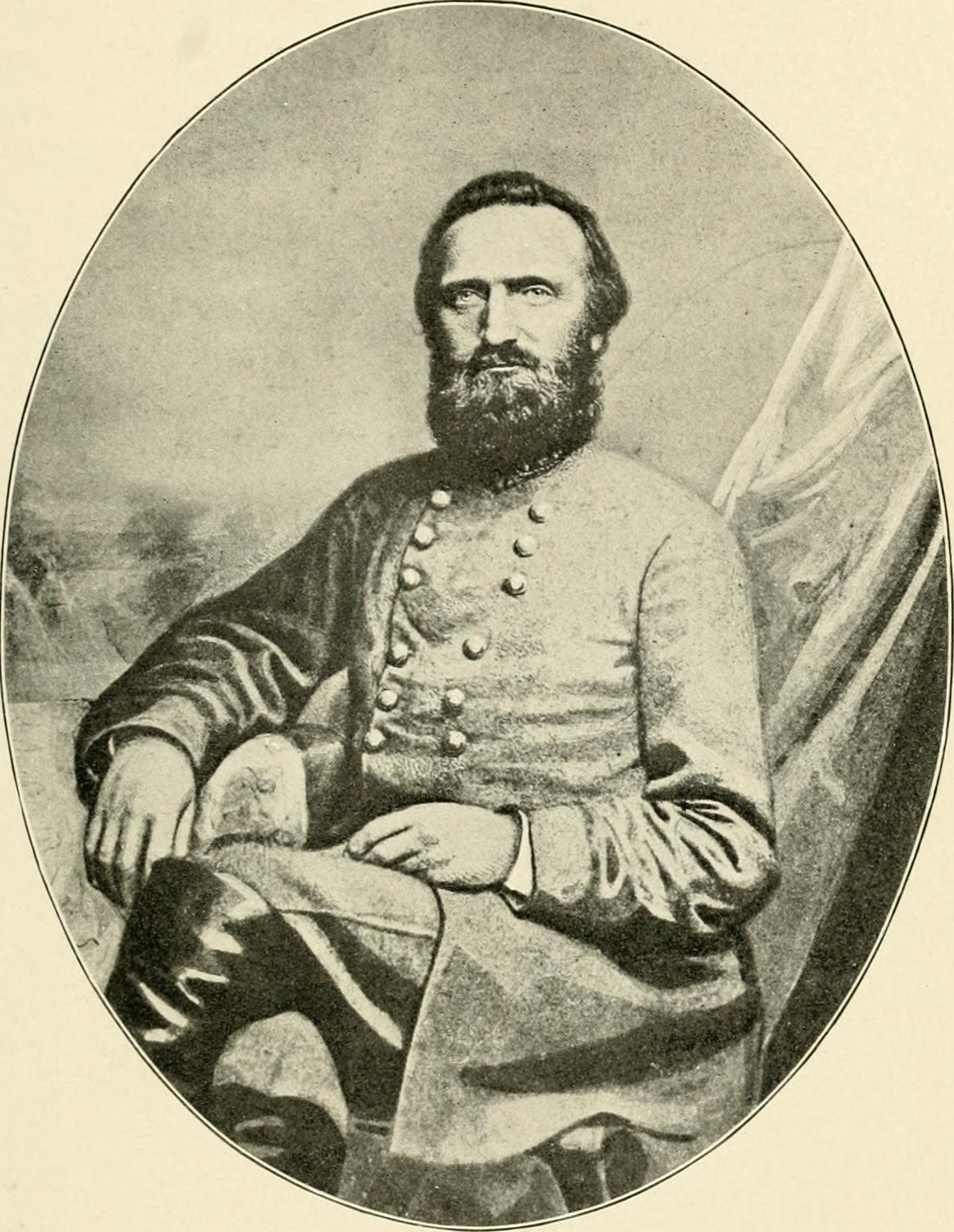
Stonewall Jackson, Winchester, 1862

Confederate General Stonewall Jackson was wounded at the Battle of Chancellorsville on May 2, 1863, and his left arm was amputated by Hunter McGuire. Chaplain Beverly Tucker Lacy had the arm buried at Ellwood Manor. Jackson died on May 10. Confederate staff officer James Power Smith had a granite monument erected for the gravesite of the arm in 1903, although it is not known how accurately Smith's marker represents the true location of the arm. Legend holds that American military officer Smedley Butler had the arm exhumed in 1921, although the factual accuracy of this story is dubious. While it is unknown where the arm is now located, or if it even still exists, the marker has become a tourist site.

== Jackson and the amputation ==
Thomas J. Jackson was born on January 21, 1824. He attended West Point, and after graduating in 1846, served in the United States Army, including in the Mexican–American War. In 1852, he resigned from the army and began teaching at the Virginia Military Institute. After the start of the American Civil War in 1861, Jackson became an officer in the Virginia militia and joined the Confederate States Army. At the First Battle of Bull Run, he gained fame and the nickname "Stonewall". Serving as a high-ranking officer in the Army of Northern Virginia under Robert E. Lee, Jackson fought in a number of battles and became well known. On May 2, 1863, in the Battle of Chancellorsville, Jackson led his force on a successful flank attack against the Federal army. While scouting in front of his own lines the night after the flank attack, Jackson was shot in a friendly fire incident. He was wounded in three places: one in the right hand and two in the left arm. A few hours later, Hunter McGuire examined Jackson's wounds, and determined that his left arm needed amputation. Jackson was sedated with chloroform, and the arm was cut off near the shoulder.

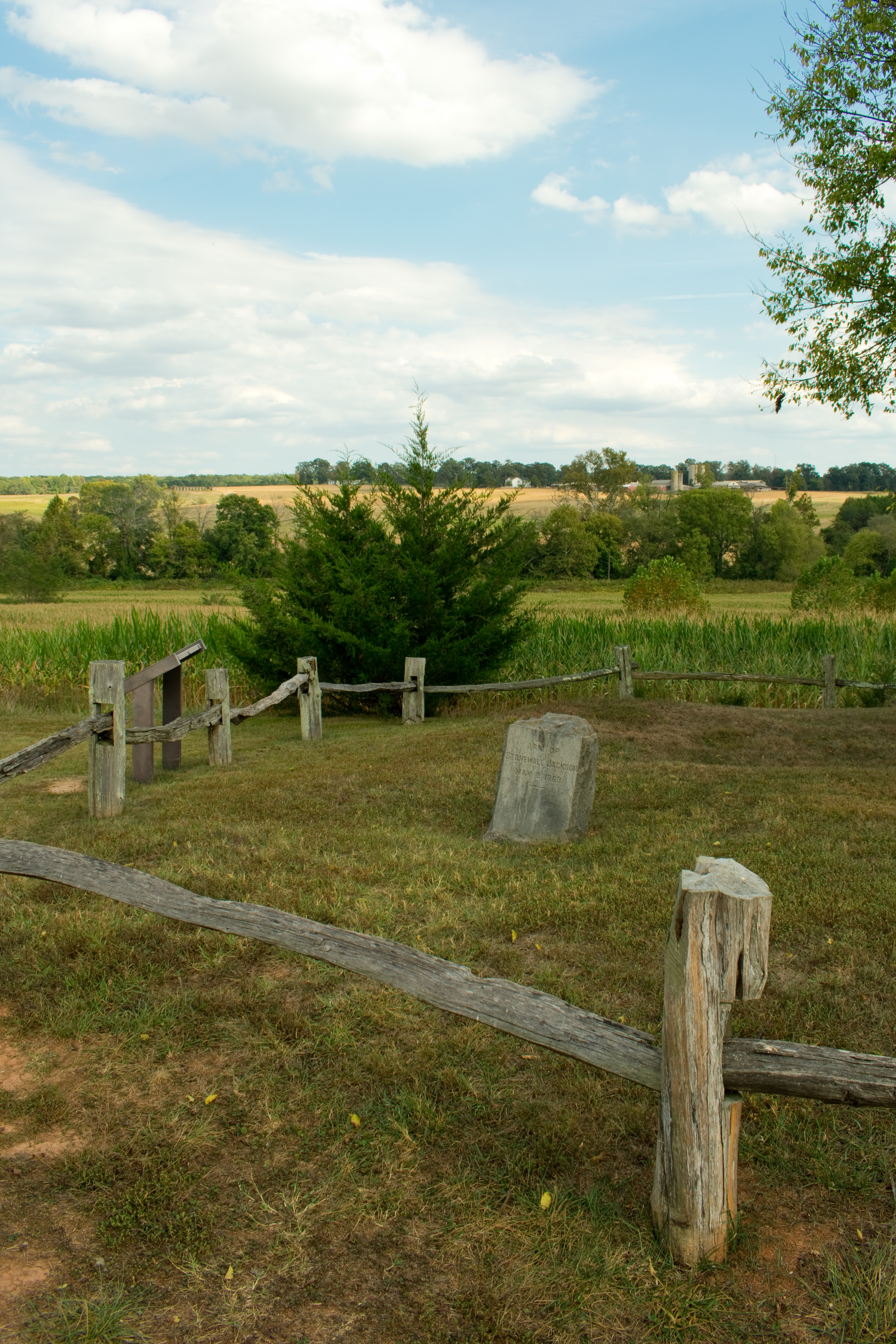
A modern view of the granite marker

While helping prepare the wounded Jackson to be moved from the battlefield for his safety, chaplain Beverly Tucker Lacy noticed Jackson's arm, wrapped up and intended to be buried in a ditch with other amputated limbs. Believing that the arm deserved a better fate, Lacy had the arm buried at Ellwood Manor (a home owned by Lacy's brother), in the family plot there. The general was not informed of the limb's burial. Jackson died of pneumonia on May 10. Jackson's widow was asked if she desired the exhumation of the arm so that it could be buried along with the general, but declined after being assured that the arm had received Christian burial. The next year, on May 6, during the Battle of the Wilderness, a Federal soldier reported in his diary that some of his fellow soldiers had exhumed the arm and then reburied it, although the location of the reburial is not known.

A granite marker was placed to the marker in 1903 by former Jackson staff officer James Power Smith. It is not known how accurately this marker reflects the actual burial site of Jackson's arm. Other markers placed by Smith at battlefields are, in the words of the National Park Service (NPS), "quite approximate in nature". The marker bears the words "Arm of Stonewall Jackson May 3, 1863". Despite the cemetery containing the graves of 15 people, the only grave monument is the one for the arm.

== Smedley Butler ==
In 1921, a force from the United States Marine Corps conducted a large mock battle at the Wilderness battlefield, led by American military officer Smedley Butler. Among the visitors were President of the United States Warren G. Harding and his wife, Florence Harding. The Hardings stayed at Ellwood during their visit, and Florence was reported to have visited the burial site of Jackson's arm. By the late 1930s, a story from the family who owned Ellwood had begun to circulate claiming that Butler had been told of and disbelieved the claim that Jackson's arm had been buried at the site, and ordered an excavation made by a squad of Marines. The tale claims that Butler and the Marines found the remains of the arm and had it reburied in a metal container. Further versions of the story have claimed that the arm received a 21-gun salute upon reburial. One account claims that Butler filed a report about what had happened, but no such report has been located. Family history also claims that Butler revisited the site long after the 1921 mock battle.

While the story about Butler's 1921 visit is repeated on a historical marker near the site, and has been often published, the factual accuracy of the legend is disputed. Ellwood came under the control of the NPS in 1977 as part of the Fredericksburg and Spotsylvania National Military Park, and the NPS conducted an archaeological study at the site. The study found no evidence of disturbed earth around the marker, and NPS attempts to locate a metal container with a metal detector have failed to detect any such container. A 2010 NPS press release included the conclusion "the arm was never dug up. It certainly was not reburied in the box near the marker" and expressed a belief that the Butler story was false. The press release also noted the NPS had failed to find documentation supporting the story from before 1940. A historian for the NPS has also rejected claims that the arm was stolen, or that it is located in storage somewhere.

== Later history ==
A metal plaque reading "A Tribute to the Memory of Stonewall Jackson by the East Coast Expeditionary Force United States Marines. Sept. 26 - Oct. 4, 1921" was formerly affixed to the 1903 marker. It is unknown when this plaque was affixed, although according to legend it was added during the 1921 mock battle. At an unknown date, the plaque either eroded off or was removed from the granite marker. It has since been placed into storage. Chris Mackowski, writing for Civil War Times, questions why Butler would have had a marker prepared if he had not known about the arm before the 1921 exercise, but also asks why it would have been installed on the marker if the site was dug up and found to be empty.

Mackowski writes that frequent digging in the park could have rendered the arm unlocatable, or that the arm could have completely disintegrated over time. However, he does conclude that "In all likelihood, Stonewall Jackson's missing arm is still in the Ellwood family cemetery". NPS historian Frank O'Reilly states he believes that Jackson's arm was indeed buried in the area, but that it either no longer exists or is buried at a lost location elsewhere in the cemetery. Mackowski and historian Kristopher D. White have compared the monument for Jackson's arm to the Boot Monument for Benedict Arnold's injury at the Battle of Saratoga, the display of Santa Anna's prosthetic leg at a museum in Illinois, and the museum display of Daniel Sickles's leg.

The marker has become a tourist attraction, and in 1998, the NPS and a private group added a parking lot and signage to make the arm's burial site more accessible. In 2019, the NPS opened an exhibit of surgical tools used by McGuire that are believed to have been the ones used to amputate Jackson's arm; the tools have also been displayed at the Museum of the Confederacy as well.

== See also ==
- Attempted theft of George Washington's skull

== Sources ==
- Davis, Burke (1988) [1954]. They Called Him Stonewall: A Life of Lt. General T. J. Jackson, C.S.A. New York: The Fairfax Press. ISBN 0-517-66204-3.
- Gwynne, S. C. (2014). Rebel Yell: The Violence, Passion, and Redemption of Stonewall Jackson. New York: Scribner. ISBN 978-1-4516-7328-9.
- Mackowski, Chris (2013). "Mystery in the Wilderness: The War's Most Famous Appendage Has a Following All Its Own". Civil War Times. Vol. 52, no. 2.
- Mackowski, Chris; White, Kristopher D. (2013). The Last Days of Stonewall Jackson: The Mortal Wounding of the Confederacy's Greatest Icon. El Dorado Hills, California: Savas Beatie. ISBN 978-1-61121-150-4.
- Smith-Christmas, Kenneth L. (2023). "The Mystery of Smedley Butler and Stonewall Jackson's Arm". Military Collector & Historian. 75 (1): 74.
- Warner, Ezra J. (2006) [1959]. Generals in Gray (Louisiana Paperback ed.). Baton Rouge, Louisiana: Louisiana State University Press. ISBN 978-0-8071-3150-3.
