= The Wide Wide Sea =

2024 non-fiction book by Hampton Sides

The Wide Wide Sea: Imperial Ambition, First Contact and the Fateful Final Voyage of Captain James Cook
- Author: Hampton Sides
- Language: English
- Genre: Non-fiction
- Publisher: Doubleday
- Publication date: 2024
- Publication place: United States
- Pages: 432
- ISBN: 978-0385544764

The Wide Wide Sea: Imperial Ambition, First Contact and the Fateful Final Voyage of Captain James Cook (Doubleday, 2024) is a non-fiction book written by Hampton Sides. It documents the final voyage of Captain James Cook.

== Reviews ==
- The New York Times Book Review
- The Washington Post
