= Blood and Thunder (book) =

2006 non-fiction book by Hampton Sides

Blood and Thunder: An Epic of the American West
- Author: Hampton Sides
- Language: English
- Genre: History/American History
- Publisher: Doubleday
- Publication date: 2006
- Publication place: United States
- Pages: 480
- ISBN: 0385507771

Blood and Thunder: An Epic of the American West (Doubleday, 2006), is a non-fiction book written by American historian and author, Hampton Sides. It focuses on the transformation of the American West during the 19th Century.

== Key figures ==
- Kit Carson: Frontiersman, wilderness guide and member of the Union Army.
- Narbona: Prominent Navajo strongman and leader.
- Stephen W. Kearny: Brigadier General in the United States Army and fixture of the Mexican–American War.
- Henry Hopkins Sibley: Brigadier General in the Confederate States Army.

== See also ==
- Manifest Destiny
- Battle of Valverde
- Battle of San Pasqual
- Long Walk of the Navajo

== Reviews ==
- The New York Times, The New York Times Book Review
- USA Today, Book Reviews
- The Washington Post

== Media ==
- Google Books
- National Public Radio, Author Interviews
- On Point with Tom Ashbrook; WBUR-FM, Boston
- CBS News Sunday Morning
- C-SPAN; Cities Tour
- C-SPAN.
- The Diane Rehm Show, NPR
- The New York Times Best Seller list, The New York Times Book Review
