= Ghost Soldiers =

2001 non-fiction book by Hampton Sides

Ghost Soldiers: The Epic Account of World War II's Greatest Rescue Mission
- First edition
- Author: Hampton Sides
- Language: English
- Genre: history
- Publisher: Anchor Books
- Publication date: 2001
- Publication place: United States
- Pages: 343
- ISBN: 9781299076518
- OCLC: 842990576

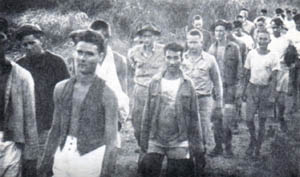
Former Cabanatuan POWs march to freedom

Ghost Soldiers: The Epic Account of World War II's Greatest Rescue Mission (Doubleday, 2001) is a non-fiction book written by Hampton Sides. It is about the World War II Allied prison camp raid at Cabanatuan in the Philippines.

== Synopsis ==
In late January 1945, 121 Ranger volunteers set out to attempt a rescue of over 513 Allied prisoners of war in a Japanese camp near the Philippine city of Cabanatuan. The prisoners, survivors of the Bataan Death March, had lived in deplorable conditions for three years, suffering from starvation, tropical diseases, and abuse from Japanese soldiers. Ghost Soldiers recounts the story of the prisoners, the Ranger unit performing the raid, and the Filipino guerrillas who provided assistance. A massacre of American soldiers at Palawan alerted U.S. commanders to the danger of mass POW murder as the Japanese retreated from the Philippines. As a consequence, they planned and executed a mission to rescue the POWs from Cabanatuan prison camp. Ghost Soldiers provides historical background to the events leading to the raid, detailed accounts of camp conditions, the prisoners' heroic will to survive, and the planning and successful execution of the rescue.

== Film adaptation ==
- The movie The Great Raid was partially based on Ghost Soldiers, along with William Breuer's The Great Raid on Cabanatuan.
- The movie I Was an American Spy was based on the exploits of Claire Phillips, an American spy undercover as a cabaret owner in Manila.

== Awards and honors ==
- 2001 New York Times bestseller, Nonfiction #7
- 2001 Amazon.com Best Books, Top 25 Editors' Favorites, #4
- 2002 PEN Center USA Literary Awards, Research Nonfiction

== Reviews ==
- New York Times, “Books Of The Times"; A Heroic Military Rescue After the Hell of Bataan”
- Kirkus Reviews; “An extraordinary tale of bravery under fire and the will to endure…”

== See also ==
- Raid at Cabanatuan
- Bataan Death March
- Henry Mucci
