= Americana (Sides book) =

2004 collection of essays compiled by Hampton Sides

Americana: Dispatches from the New Frontier
- Author: Hampton Sides
- Language: English
- Subject: Travel; American history
- Publisher: Doubleday
- Publication date: 2004
- Publication place: United States
- Pages: 464
- ISBN: 1400033551

Americana: Dispatches from the New Frontier is a 2004 collection of non-fiction essays compiled by American historian and author Hampton Sides. The book was published in paperback on April 13, 2004, through Doubleday.

== Summary ==
The book consists of several essays Sides wrote while traveling through the United States and examining American cultures over a 15-year period. Sides pays specific attention to subcultures that would fall under the topic of "Americana".

== Reviews ==
Westword gave a favorable opinion of Americana, writing "Engendered by a crack facility for vivid, pictorial prose, [Sides] invites readers into each story with him." The San Francisco Chronicle was also favorable, stating "Much of the collection's charm rests in its gallivanting, "road trip" narrative form, with stops across the map, as Sides gathers the odd-fitting pieces that, once assembled, best define "Americana.""
