= Daniel Sickles's leg =

Amputated limb of a Union Army general

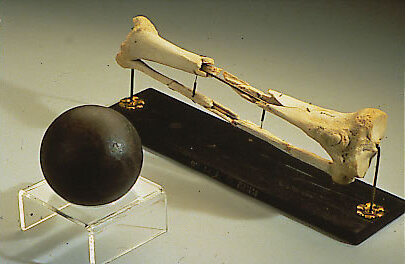
Sickles's leg bones on display

The amputated right lower leg of Union Army general Daniel Sickles, lost after a cannonball wound suffered at the Battle of Gettysburg on July 2, 1863, is displayed at the National Museum of Health and Medicine.

Sickles was a former New York politician who entered the army after the outbreak of the American Civil War in 1861. After originally commanding the Excelsior Brigade, Sickles was promoted to major general in 1862 and later commanded the III Corps at the battles of Chancellorsville and Gettysburg. At Gettysburg, Sickles moved the III Corps forward from his assigned position, and it was shattered by a Confederate attack. During the fighting, he was struck in the leg by a solid shot; the wound later required amputation above the knee. After the amputation, the limb was donated to the Army Medical Museum (now the National Museum of Health and Medicine), where it was used as a teaching example of battlefield trauma. Sickles sometimes visited the limb afterwards, and it remains a popular attraction at the museum.

== Background ==
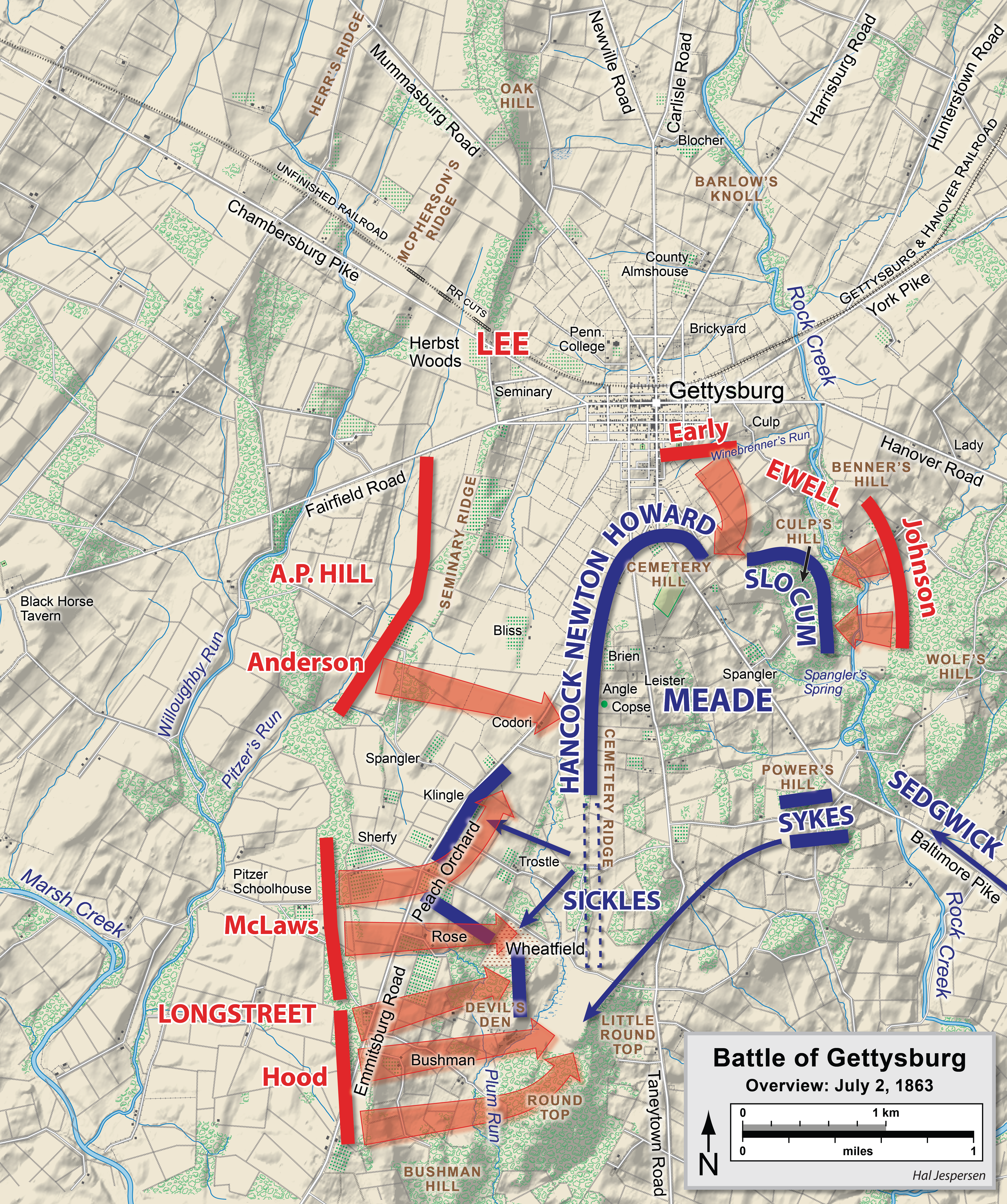
July 2 at Gettysburg. Sickles's line is the blue line at the left, near the Peach Orchard.

Sickles was born on October 20, 1819, in New York City. He entered politics and served in the United States Congress from 1857 to 1861. In 1859, he gained notoriety for shooting Philip Barton Key II over an affair Key had with Sickles's wife. Sickles successfully pleaded temporary insanity for the first time in United States history. After the outbreak of the American Civil War in 1861, he joined the Union Army and was commissioned a brigadier general. Originally commanding the Excelsior Brigade, he was promoted to major general in November 1862, and commanded a division at the Battle of Fredericksburg and the III Corps at the Battle of Chancellorsville; he would also lead the III Corps at the Battle of Gettysburg.

== Leg wound and later display ==
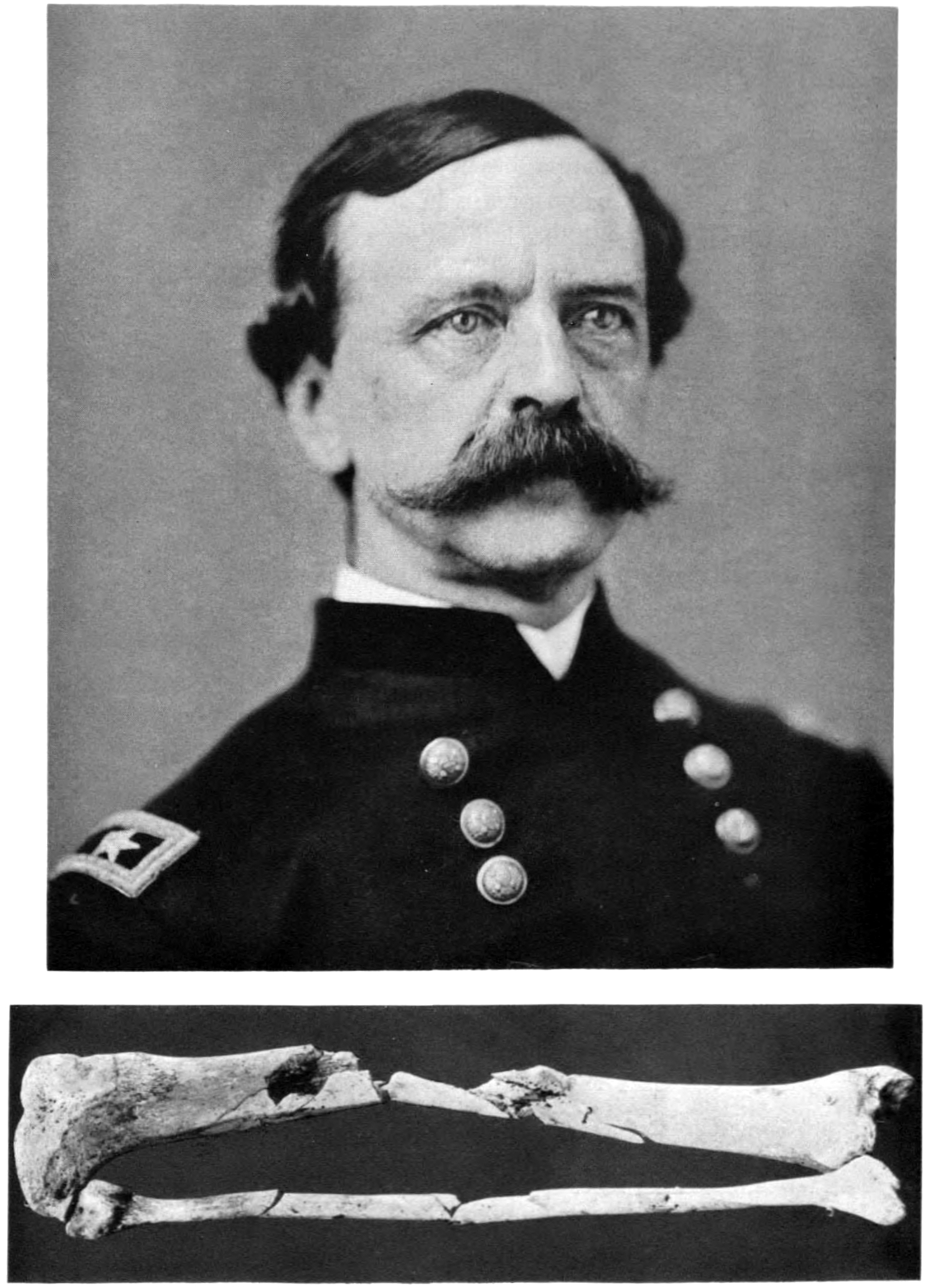
Sickles and his shattered leg

Early on July 2, 1863, with the Battle of Gettysburg ongoing, Sickles became concerned about the suitability of the position the III Corps was assigned to defend. He later decided to abandon the position he had been assigned and moved his troops forward to another line along the Emmitsburg Road. While this new position had some positive features, it was also exposed and the prior position had been adequate. Confederate troops commanded by James Longstreet attacked Sickles's new position, and the III Corps was overrun. With his line crumbling, Sickles rode up to the portion of III Corps at the Peach Orchard, which was falling apart. After watching the retreat of the 141st Pennsylvania Infantry Regiment, he headed towards the Trostle Farm.

After riding onto a knoll for a better view of the fighting, Sickles was hit in the right leg by a 12-pound (5.4 kg) solid shot. The shot did not startle Sickles's horse, and he dismounted and a tourniquet was applied to the wound. After transferring command of the III Corps to David B. Birney, Sickles was taken off the field on a stretcher while puffing on a cigar. The injury had broken both of the bones (the tibia and the fibula) of his lower right leg. The medical director of the III Corps, Thomas Sim, performed an amputation of Sickles's leg. It was initially thought that the cut could be made below the knee, but upon further inspection it was determined that the damage was more severe than first thought, and an amputation above the knee was required. The general had been anesthetized with chloroform before the amputation. After the limb was cut off, it was kept, possibly by Sim.

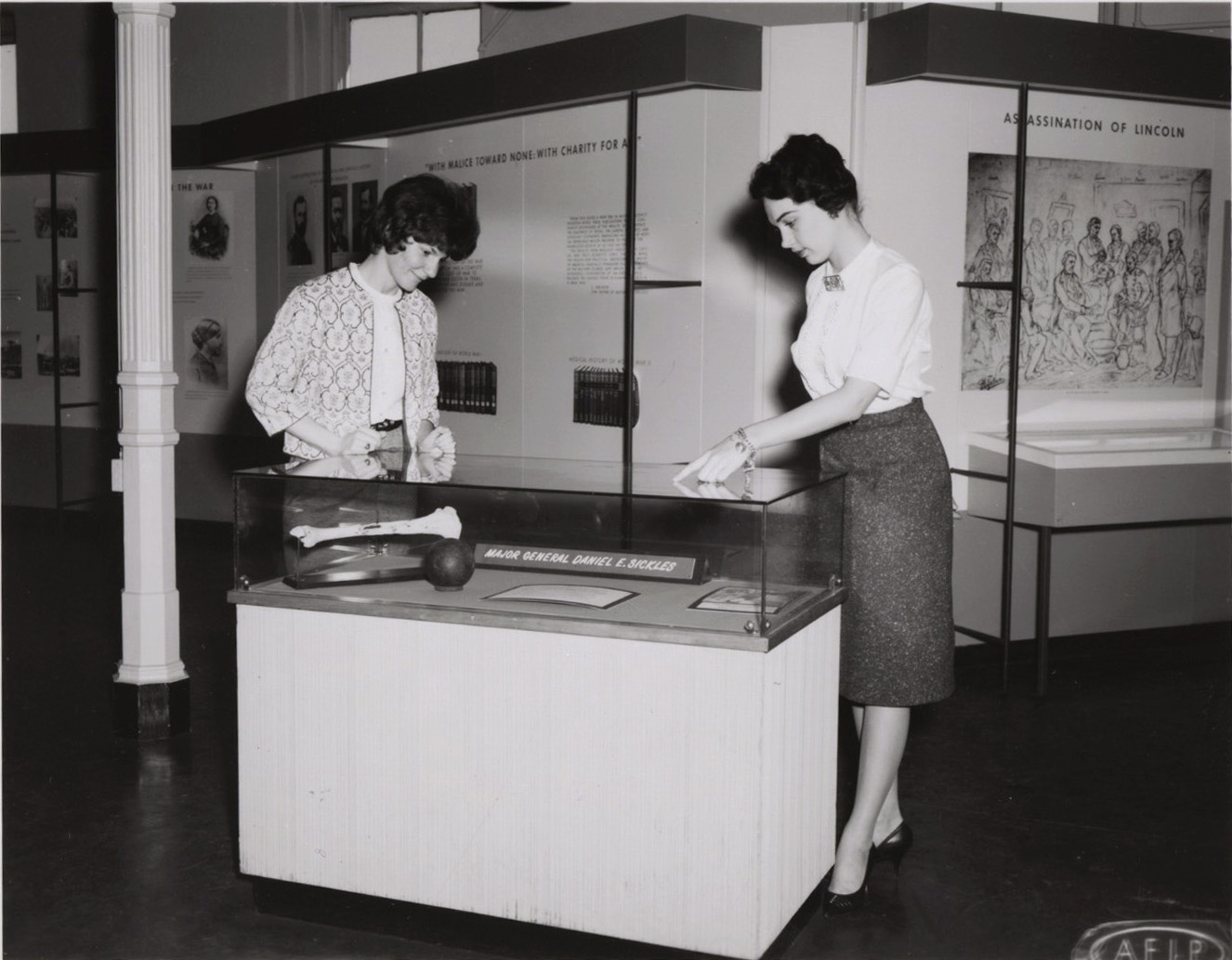
Viewing the leg at the National Museum of Health and Medicine (1963)

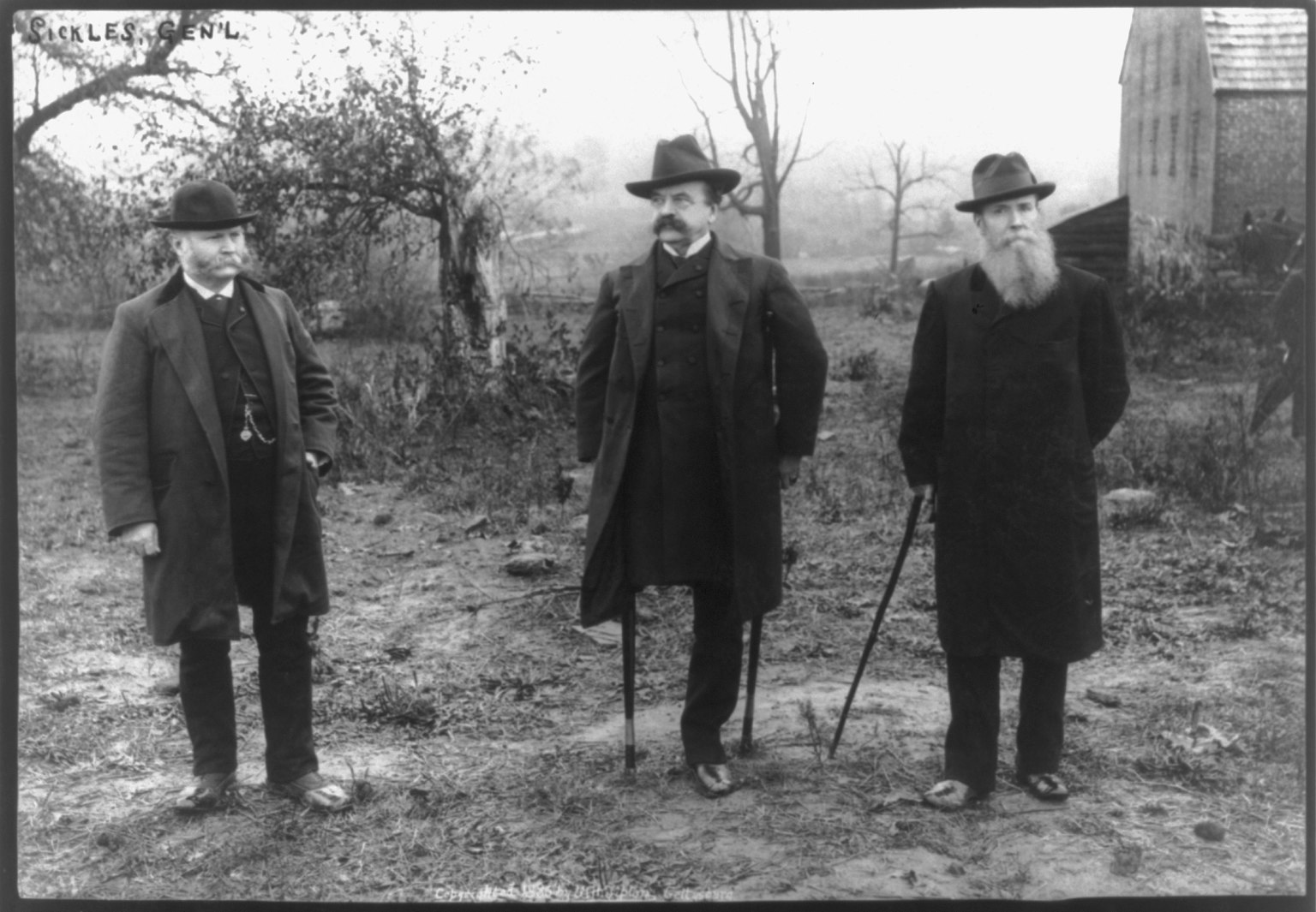
Sickles re-visiting the battlefield where he lost his leg

Aware that the Army Medical Museum (since renamed the National Museum of Health and Medicine) had been recently founded, Sickles had the leg forwarded to the museum in a coffin-shaped box, as it had begun accumulating "specimens of morbid anatomy". The damaged tibia and fibula were stabilized with wire and used as a museum specimen. The bones were used as a teaching example of battlefield trauma. Sickles recovered quickly from the wound, but never held a field command again. He sometimes visited the limb on the anniversary of its loss, and sometimes brought visitors with him, including, on one occasion, Mark Twain who stated that he believed the general valued the lost leg more than his still-extant one. Upon his first visit to the limb, Sickles allegedly berated the museum for not preserving his foot as well. He retired from the army in 1869, was a diplomat to Spain, served another term in Congress, and died on May 3, 1914, at age 94.

The leg bones have since been enclosed in a glass case and have been reported as of 2014 to be one of the museum's most requested exhibits. For a time in 2011, the bones were displayed at Fort Detrick, but as of 2021 are again displayed at the National Museum of Health and Medicine. The bones are attached to a wooden stand by metal prongs and are displayed next to a cannonball of the type that caused the wound.

== See also ==
- Stonewall Jackson's arm
- Lord Uxbridge's leg
- Attempted theft of George Washington's skull

== Sources ==
- Clarke, Tim Jr. (2014). "Sickles' Leg and the Army Medical Museum". Military Medicine. 179 (8): 1051. doi:10.7205/MILMED-D-14-00182. PMID 25181725.
- Hessler, James A. (2009). Sickles at Gettysburg. New York: Savas Beatie. ISBN 978-1-932714-84-5.
- Pfanz, Harry W. (1987). Gettysburg: The Second Day. Chapel Hill, North Carolina: University of North Carolina Press. ISBN 978-0-8078-4730-5.
- Warner, Ezra J. (2006) [1964]. Generals in Blue: Lives of the Union Commanders. Baton Rouge, Louisiana: Louisiana State University Press. ISBN 0-8071-3149-0.
