= William Breuer =

William B. Breuer (September 17, 1922 – August 18, 2010) was a soldier, journalist and American military historian, who specialized in the World War II epoch.

== Legacy ==
His work, The Great Raid on Cabanatuan along with Hampton Sides' Ghost Soldiers, was adapted into a film titled The Great Raid (2005).

== Bibliography ==
- Agony at Anzio
- The Air-raid Warden Was a Spy: and Other Tales from Home-front America in World War II. Hoboken, NJ: Wiley, 2003. ISBN 0-471-23488-5
- An American Saga
- Bizarre tales from World War II. Edison, NJ: Castle Books, 2005, c1999. ISBN 0-785-81992-4 OCLC 60565573
- Bloody Clash at Sadzot: Hitler's Final Strike for Antwerp. New York: Jove, 1981. ISBN 0-515-10351-9
- Captain Cool
- Daring Missions of World War II, 2002. ISBN 0471150878
- Death of a Nazi Army: the Falaise Pocket. New York: Stein and Day, 1985. ISBN 0-812-83024-5
- Devil Boats: the PT War against Japan. Novato, CA: Presidio, 1987. ISBN 0-891-41269-7
- Drop Zone, Sicily: Allied Airborne Strike, July 1943. Novato, CA: Presidio, 1983. ISBN 0-891-41196-8
- Feuding Allies: the Private Wars of the High Command. New York: John Wiley & Sons, 1995. ISBN 0-471-12252-1
- Geronimo!: American paratroopers in World War II . New York: St. Martin's, 1989. ISBN 0-312-03350-8 OCLC 19887398
- Guts!: 27 Courageous People and Their Triumphs Over Adversity. New Horizon Press, 2005. ISBN 0-882-82259-4
- The Great Raid on Cabanatuan: Rescuing the Doomed Ghosts of Bataan and Corregidor. Wiley, 1994. ISBN 0471037427
- Hitler's Fortress Cherbourg: the conquest of a bastion. New York: Stein and Day, 1984. ISBN 0-812-82952-2 OCLC 10558461
- Hitler's Undercover War: the Nazi Espionage Invasion of the U.S.A. New York: St. Martin's, 1989. ISBN 0-312-02620-X
- Hoodwinking Hitler
- J. Edgar Hoover and His G-Men
- MacArthur's Undercover War: Spies, Saboteurs, Guerrillas, and Secret Missions. ISBN 0-471-11458-8
- Nazi Spies in America
- Operation Dragoon: the Allied Invasion of the South of France. Novato, CA: Presidio, 1987. ISBN 0-891-41307-3 OCLC 12750811
- Operation Torch: The Allied Gamble to Invade North Africa.
- Race to the Moon: America's Duel with the Soviets. Praeger, 1993. ISBN 0-275-94481-6
- Retaking the Philippines: America's Return to Corregidor and Bataan, October 1944-March 1945. New York: St. Martin's Press, 1986. ISBN 0-312-67802-9 OCLC 13761706
- Sea Wolf: a Biography of John D. Bulkeley, USN. Novato, CA: Presidio, 1989. ISBN 0-891-41335-9 OCLC 18258522
- The Secret War with Germany: Deception, Espionage, and Dirty Tricks, 1939-1945. New York: Jove Books, 1989, c1988. ISBN 0-515-10013-7 OCLC 19643834
- Secret Weapons of World War II
- Shadow Warriors: The Covert War in Korea. New York: John Wiley & Sons, 1996. ISBN 0-471-14438-X OCLC 33007714
- Storming Hitler’s Rhine: the Allied Assault, February–March 1945. New York: St. Martin's Press, 1985. ISBN 0-312-76250-X OCLC 11650629
- They Jumped at Midnight
- Top Secret Tales of World War II
- Undercover Tales of World War II
- Unexplained Mysteries of World War II
- Vendetta: Castro and the Kennedy Brothers
- War and American Women: Heroism, Deeds, and Controversy. Praeger, 1997. ISBN 0-313-00359-9
