= Ellwood Manor =

Historic house in Virginia, United States

- U.S. Historic district – Contributing property
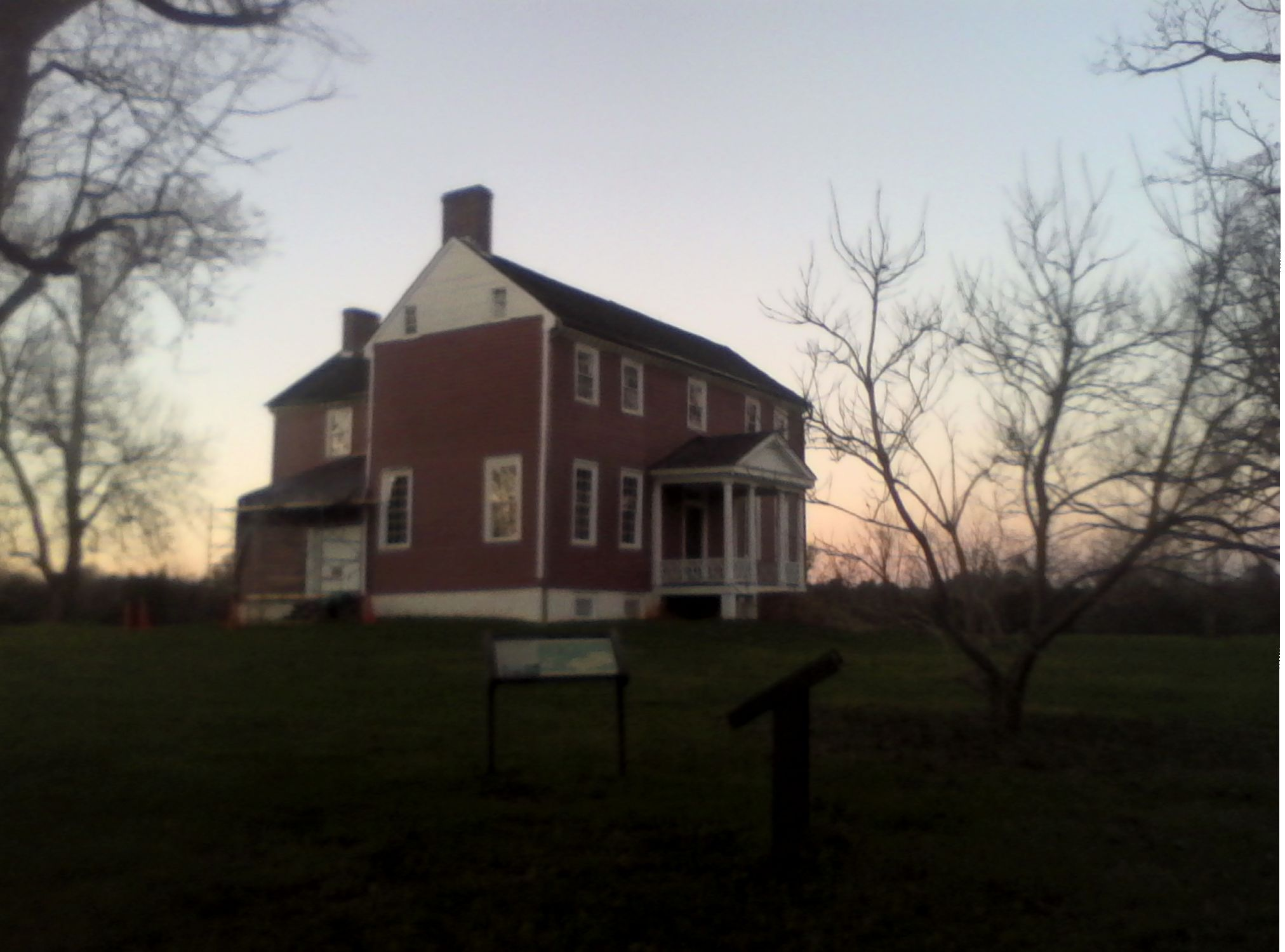
- Nearest city: Fredericksburg, Virginia
- Area: 4,601.1 acres (1,862.0 ha)
- Built: 1790
- Built by: William Jones
- Architectural style: Georgian
- Part of: Fredericksburg and Spotsylvania County Battlefields Memorial National Military Park (ID66000046)

Ellwood Manor is the Georgian-style home completed c. 1790 by William Jones, formerly in Spotsylvania County, Virginia but now in Orange County, Virginia. For more than a century, it was the center of a large, thriving plantation not far from the Chancellorsville crossroads on the Plank Road between Fredericksburg and Orange, Virginia which is now Virginia State Route 3. Not long before the American Civil War, J. Horace Lacy married William Jones' younger daughter and (after litigation) inherited both Ellwood (managed by his brother Beverly Tucker Lacy) and Chatham Manor (in Stafford County on the other side of Fredericksburg).

During the American Civil War, both Lacy brothers became Confederate officers, and caretakers managed the property when it was not being used by the armies fighting nearby. Confederate forces used Ellwood as a headquarters and then hospital after the Battle of Chancellorsville in 1863. Chaplain Beverly Tucker Lacy buried General Stonewall Jackson's arm (amputated after a friendly fire incident which ultimately led to the general's death) in the Jones/Lacy family cemetery at Ellwood. Before the Battle of the Wilderness the following year (which proved a costly draw for Confederate forces), Union general Gouverneur K. Warren used Ellwood as his headquarters. It later served as a Union hospital during the ultimately successful drive to Richmond. In subsequent years, Ellwood returned to its prior farming use. By modern times, the house became the only structure surviving from the latter battle, and was ultimately donated to the government in 1977 and became part of the same Fredericksburg and Spotsylvania National Military Park as Chatham Manor.

== Antebellum and slavery ==
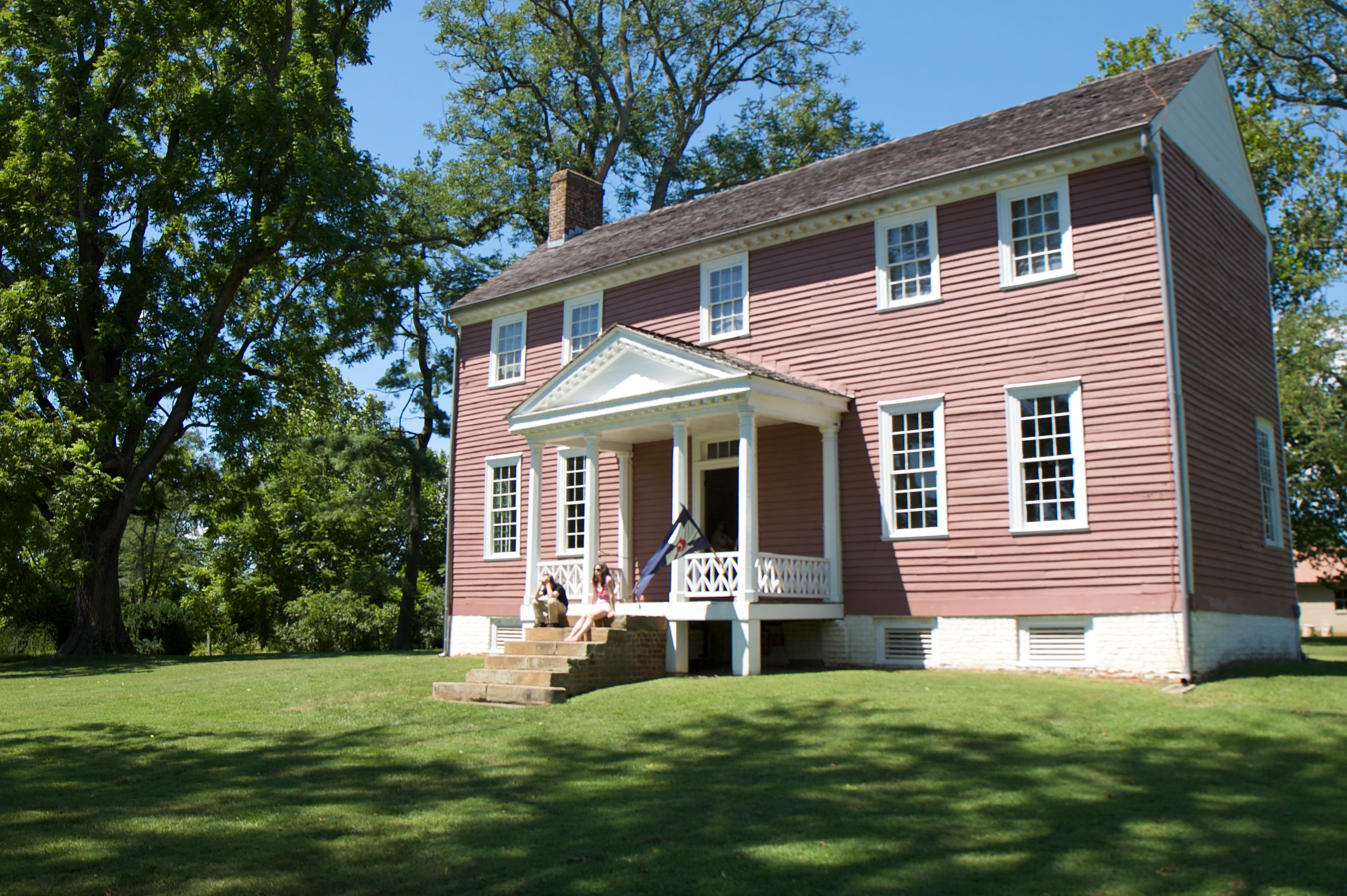
Ellwood in summer

In colonial times, the land was given as a grant to Governor Alexander Spottswood, who did not develop it, but gave his name to the county in which most of the property stood. During the American Revolutionary War, Churchill Jones rose to the rank of Major in the Southern Legion, under the command of "Light-Horse Harry" Lee. After the war, Churchill joined his brother William Jones who had moved to the area known as the Wilderness and begun a farm. c. 1790, William Jones began building a house which he called Ellwood (as was the surrounding plantation). In 1781 Ellwood hosted troops of the Marquis de Lafayette as he waited for reinforcements from General Anthony Wayne on their way to what became the final campaign at Yorktown. Churchill built Woodville nearby, but in 1806 he acquired Chatham Manor just north of Fredericksburg. According to tradition, "Light-Horse Harry" Lee wrote his wartime memoirs at Ellwood. In 1825, the Marquis de Lafayette visited Ellwood on his triumphal return visit to the United States.

In 1828, after William Jones lost his first wife, the septuagenarian married his former wife's grandniece, 16 year old Lucinda Gordon. They ultimately had a daughter, who was many decades younger than Jones' other surviving daughter, Hannah, who had successively married and survived Williamson and John Coalter before William died (aged 95) in 1845. He gave Lucinda Ellwood on the condition that she not remarry. However, Lucinda gave Ellwood to their daughter within 2 years so she could remarry, and Betty married J. Horace Lacy. Upon Hannah's death in 1857, Lacy and Hannah's sons from her first marriage contested the provisions in her will freeing more than 90 slaves at Chatham.

In the 1860 census Horace Lacy had owned upwards of 249 slaves as well as about 49,000 acres of land (including roughly 6000 at Chatham), with the vast majority used at Ellwood, depending on the season. Most worked as field hands or house servants, but Lacy also employed skilled tradesmen such as millers, carpenters, and blacksmiths. Little physical evidence remains to show where slaves lived. National Park Service historians and others continue research, seeking to locate the former slave quarters.

== The Civil War ==
Elwood Family Cemetery with Stonewall Jackson Arm memorial

Before the American Civil War, the educated Lacy brothers from Mississippi (J. Horace Lacy and Beverly Tucker Lacy, possible descendants of Darby Lacy who had tutored in Prince Edward County, Virginia before moving to Mississippi) acquired both Virginia properties. An outspoken proponent of slavery, J. Horace Lacy joined the Confederate Army and rose to the rank of major (with service mostly administrative); his brother Beverly Tucker Lacy (a Presbyterian minister) became the chaplain for General Stonewall Jackson, whose amputated arm was buried at Ellwood Plantation. The Lacys left Ellwood in the care of two live-in caretakers, whose Confederate sympathies caused their arrest in 1863, and jailing for some time in Washington, D.C.

Ellwood's strategic site briefly served as Confederate headquarters, and later as the headquarters for Union generals Gouverneur K. Warren and Ambrose Burnside, as well as major Union hospital during battles for control of the strategic route to the Confederate capital.

== Postwar years ==
By the time the Civil War ended in 1865, both Ellwood and Chatham were desolate and severely damaged. Ellwood was essentially abandoned for eight years, but graves still dotted the grounds. In subsequent years, the Union Burial Corps removed many soldiers' remains from the site. In 1872, the Lacys sold Chatham to pay taxes, but kept Ellwood, where they would live for the next 35 years. Betty Lacy helped found the Ladies Memorial Association of Fredericksburg, establishing the Confederate Cemetery, and her husband traveled and made speeches to raise money. In 1903, a monument was erected to mark the location of Stonewall Jackson's arm, which has long been the only marked grave in the family cemetery.

== Modern era ==
After Betty Lacy died in 1907, Indiana University law professor Hugh Evander Willis acquired the Ellwood property. It remained in his family until it was donated to the National Park Service in 1971. The NPS accepted the donation in 1977.

Today, the house and surrounding grounds are open to the public with limited hours.

Since 1998, the Friends of Wilderness Battlefield (a 501(c)3 non-profit organization, formed to support the preservation of the historic building and its grounds, has provided additional support for the historic site. Permanent exhibits were added in 2010. The house is open from 10 a.m. to 5 p.m. during the summer weekends and holidays, and May through October.

== See also ==
- Battle of Chancellorsville
- Historic houses in Virginia
