= Shadow Warriors (Breuer book) =

1996 non-fiction book written by William B. Breuer

Shadow Warriors: The Covert War in Korea
- Author: William B. Breuer
- Language: English
- Subject: Korean War
- Genre: Non-fiction
- Publisher: John Wiley & Sons
- Publication date: 1996

Shadow Warriors: The Covert War in Korea is a non-fiction book written by William B. Breuer published by John Wiley & Sons in May 1996. It describes various clandestine operations performed by the Allies/Western forces during the Korean War.
