= Chatham Manor =

Historic house in Virginia, US

Coordinates: 38°18′31.8″N 77°27′19.3″W

- U.S. Historic district – Contributing property
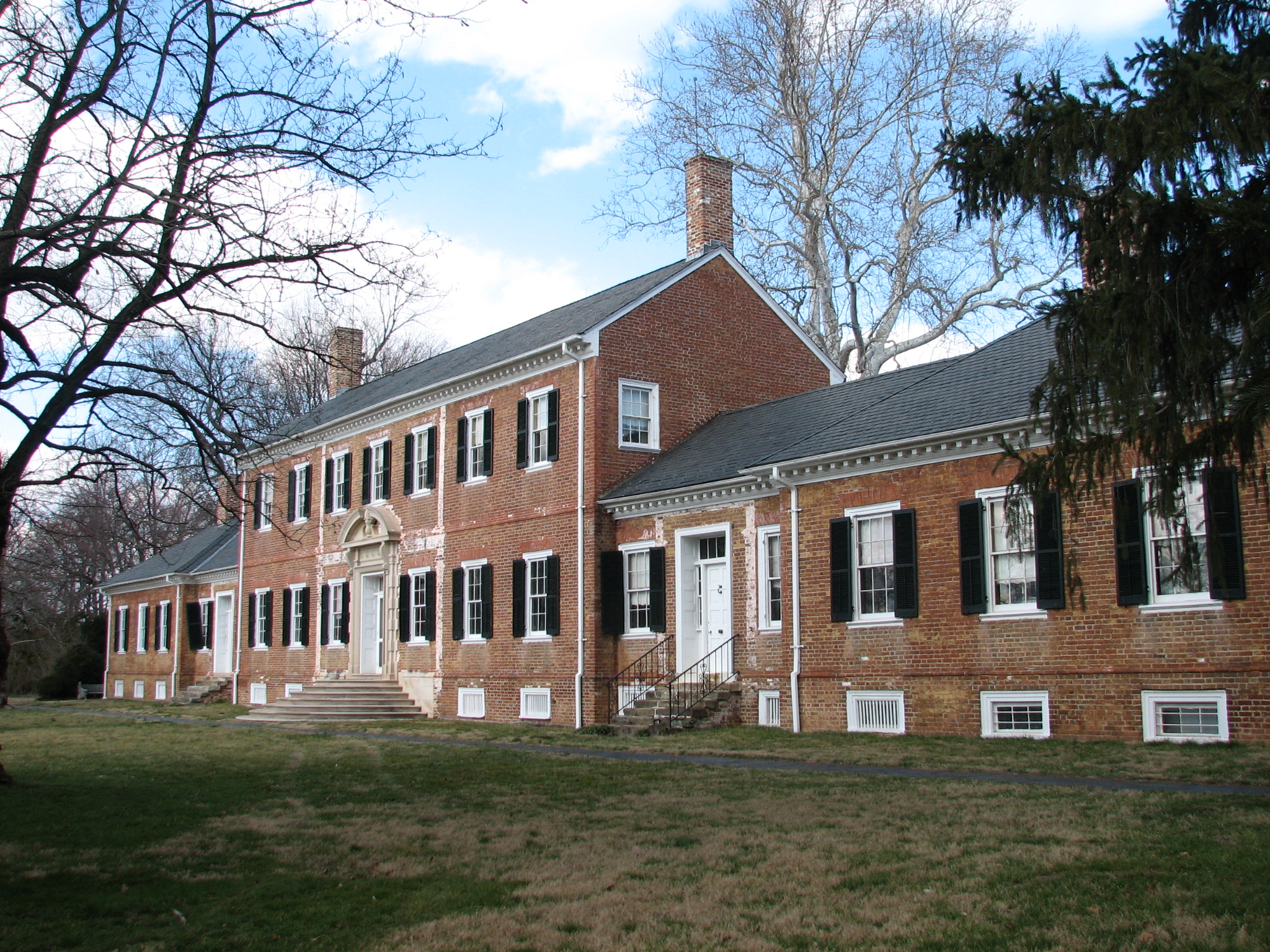
- Chatham Manor, March 2008

- Location within Northern Virginia Location within Virginia Location within the United States
- Nearest city: Fredericksburg, Virginia
- Area: 4,601.1 acres (1,862.0 ha)
- Built: 1771
- Built by: William Fitzhugh
- Architectural style: Georgian
- Part of: Fredericksburg and Spotsylvania County Battlefields Memorial National Military Park (= ID66000046)
- Added to NRHP: October 15, 1966

Chatham Manor is a Georgian-style mansion home completed in 1771 by farmer and statesman William Fitzhugh, after about three years of construction, on the Rappahannock River in Stafford County, Virginia, opposite Fredericksburg. It was for more than a century the center of a large, thriving plantation and the only private residence in the United States to be visited by George Washington, Thomas Jefferson, Abraham Lincoln, and Dwight D. Eisenhower.

Chatham also reflected the new country's racial tensions. In January 1805, Chatham's slaves overpowered and whipped their overseer and assistants in a minor slave rebellion. An armed posse of white men quickly gathered. They killed one slave in the attack, and two more died trying to escape capture. Two other slaves were deported, likely to the Caribbean or Louisiana, and Fitzhugh soon sold the property.

Five decades later, in 1857, owner Hannah Jones Coalter (the 77-year-old mother of a disabled daughter named Janet) died and attempted to manumit her 93 slaves after making provisions both for her daughter and the slaves. Her relatives sued, claiming that after the Dred Scott decision, slaves were legally incapable of choosing whether to remain enslaved or receive their freedom and enough money to establish themselves in another state. While local judges thought the executors should free the slaves per Hannah's intent, a divided Virginia Supreme Court disagreed. Thus, the executors sold Chatham with its slaves to J. Horace Lacy (husband of Hannah's much younger half-sister Betty). However, soon one enslaved person was allowed to travel to raise money to buy freedom for herself and her small family and succeeded.

During the American Civil War, the Lacys abandoned Chatham. Its strategic site overlooking Fredericksburg briefly served as a U.S. Army headquarters and later as the significant Union hospital during battles for control of the strategic Virginia city and Spotsylvania County en route to the Confederate capital. Due to wartime use and disuse, Chatham fell into significant disrepair. The Lacys ultimately sold Chatham to pay taxes (including on their other estate, Ellwood Manor) in 1872. Saved from destruction as the 20th century began by a series of wealthy American owners, Chatham was refurbished and became a showpiece. The estate was willed to the National Park Service in 1975 and now serves as the headquarters for the Fredericksburg and Spotsylvania National Military Park.

== Antebellum ==
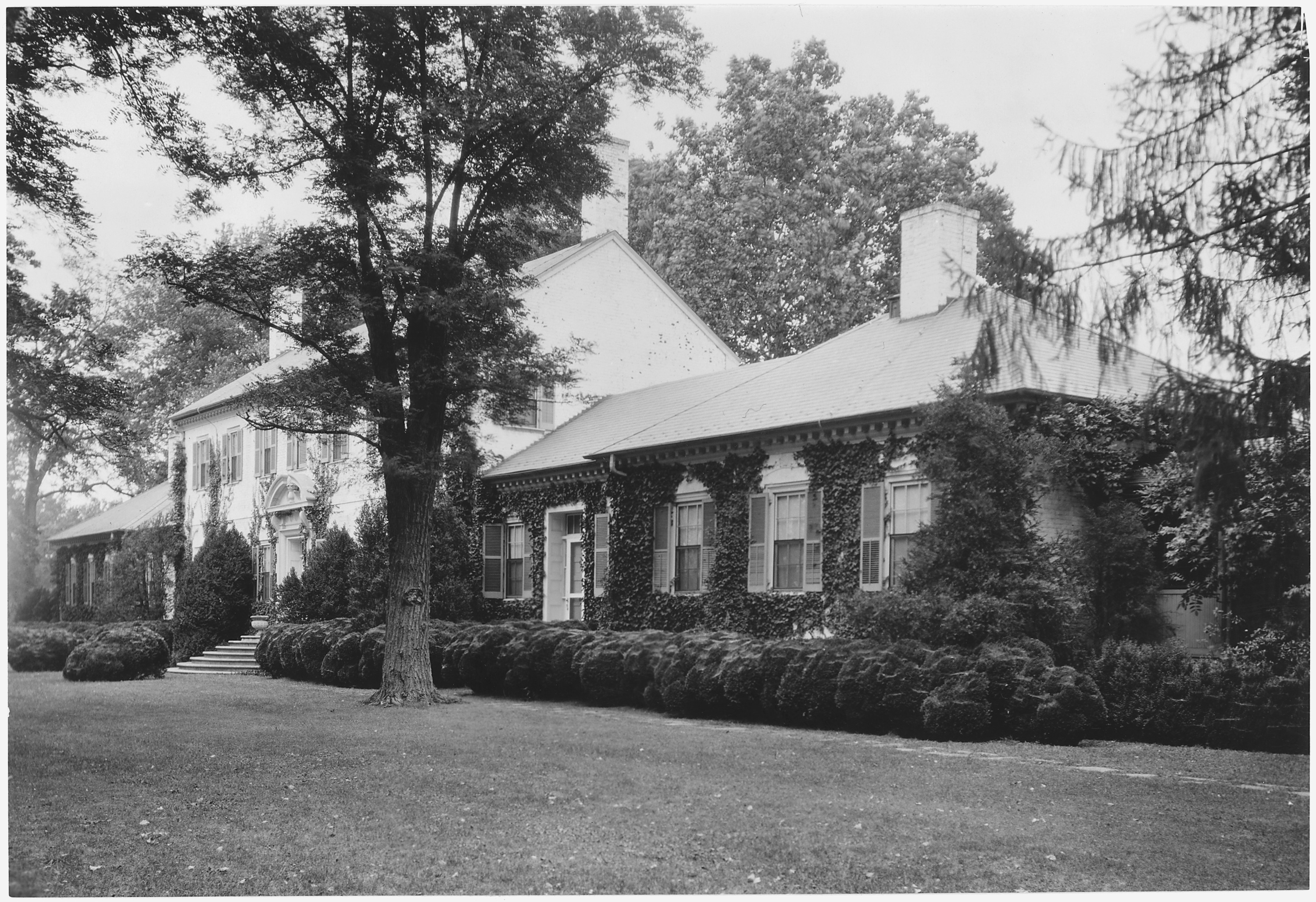
Chatham Manor in 1929

Wealthy lawyer and planter William Fitzhugh financed building the main house at Chatham over three years ending in 1771. Constructed by an enslaved workforce, the house exhibits many architectural highlights, especially on the front or riverside facade meant to be seen from across the river in Fredericksburg.

Fitzhugh was a friend and colleague of George Washington, whose family's farm was just down the Rappahannock River from Chatham. Washington's diaries note that he was a frequent guest at Chatham. He and Fitzhugh had served together in the House of Burgesses before the American Revolution and shared a love of farming and horses.

Fitzhugh's daughter, Molly, married the first president's step-grandson, George Washington Parke Custis, and became a leading abolitionist together with her friend Ann Randolph Meade Page. Their daughter Mary Anna, born at Ann Page's estate, later wed the future Confederate General Robert E. Lee, who freed the Custis slaves as the executor after his in-laws' deaths.

The 1,280-acre (5.2 km^{2}) plantation included an orchard, mill, and a race track where Fitzhugh's horses vied with those of other planters for prize money. Fitzhugh named the mansion after the British parliamentarian William Pitt, 1st Earl of Chatham, who championed many of the opinions held by American colonists before the Revolutionary War. Flanking the main house were dozens of supporting structures: slave quarters, a dairy, ice house, barns, and stables, plus fish traps installed on the river.

Fitzhugh sold the Chatham plantation to Major Churchill Jones, who had served under Col. William Washington and Gen. "Light Horse" Harry Lee. The elderly Fitzhugh then moved to a city house in Alexandria, Virginia. Jones was a member of the Society of the Cincinnati and significantly improved the estate, adding terraces down to the Rappahannock River and constructing the first bridge across that river to Fredericksburg. The bridge took a year and a half to build but washed away in the flood of 1826, slightly more than three years after Churchill Jones died. Churchill's brother William Jones had long owned an estate, Ellwood Manor, in Spotsylvania County, and inherited Chatham around the time his wife of 40 years died. Hannah Jones Coalter was William's daughter by his first wife. After her first husband died in 1825, she married three-time widower and Virginia Court of Appeals judge John Coalter (1771–1838). She received the deed to Chatham as their wedding present. Meanwhile, the 78-year-old William Jones remarried Lucy Gordon, his late wife's niece. Their 18-year marriage produced a daughter, Betty Churchill Jones, who in 1848 married her former tutor, James Horace Lacy of Mississippi, son of a Presbyterian minister.

Chatham remained known for its hospitality: Thomas Jefferson and James Monroe often visited Chatham, as later did Washington Irving. Irving visited twice while researching his multi-volume biography of George Washington, for whom he was named. William Henry Harrison and John Tyler visited on their way to their inauguration as president and vice-president in 1841.

Hannah survived her last husband by nearly two decades, as did her disabled daughter Janet. The wealthy widow attempted to provide for her daughter's care and free her household's administrator, Charles, and 92 other enslaved people in her will. However, the Virginia Constitution of 1851 (and earlier Virginia laws) required manumitted slaves to leave the state within a year, and so (as had none other than late U.S. Supreme Court Justice John Marshall for a single slave), Hannah gave her each of slaves (other than Charles, who was freed outright) the choice of remaining enslaved in Virginia (but choosing their mistresses/masters) or manumission and a small stake to enable them to support themselves in another state or country. Her estate, other than the slaves, was valued at $15,000 to $20,000, so they could be provided for. However, her executor (presumably emboldened by Betty and her husband) sought court instruction regarding their duties. While the local Stafford court thought the enslaved people should be freed, the Virginia Supreme Court disagreed. In Williamson v. Coalter, 14 Gratton 394 (1858), a majority of three justices refused to uphold Hannah's testamentary wishes, although she had revised the will shortly before she died to circumvent another recent decision refusing to uphold manumissions (Bailey v. Poindexter's executor). Her neighbor Justice Richard C.L. Moncure dissented vehemently, joined by Justice Samuels, who died shortly after that. Lacy bought Chatham for about $35,000 but ultimately sold it in 1872 to a Pennsylvania banker for $23,900.

== Slavery at Chatham ==
Fitzhugh owned upward of 100 slaves and about 49,000 acres of land (including roughly 6000 at Chatham), with anywhere from 60 to 90 being used at Chatham, depending on the season. Most worked as field hands or house servants, but he also employed skilled tradespeople such as millers, carpenters, and blacksmiths. Little physical evidence remains to show where enslaved people lived; until recently, most knowledge of enslaved people at Chatham was from written records.

In January 1805, several Chatham slaves rebelled after an overseer ordered slaves back to work at what they considered was too soon after the Christmas holidays. The slaves overpowered and whipped their overseer and four others who tried to force them back to work. An armed posse put down the rebellion and punished those involved. One black man was executed, two died while trying to escape, and two others were deported, perhaps to a slave colony in the Caribbean or Louisiana.

William Churchill gave Chatham as a wedding present for his widowed daughter Hannah and the three-time widowed Judge John Coalter. Coalter died in 1838, so Chatham passed to his wife Hannah, who did not remarry (married women at the time could only hold property through their husbands). Hannah Coalter owned 51 slaves in the 1850 census and, as an anti-slavery Methodist, unlike her late husband, tried to free enslaved people through her will upon her death in 1857. Hannah's will provided that her slaves would have the choice of being freed and migrating to a free state like Ohio, or to Liberia, with passage paid for, or of remaining as slaves with any of her (Coulter's) family members they might choose.

However, in 1848, Hannah's much younger half-sister Betty had married J. Horace Lacy, a prosperous businessman and slave owner at Ellwood Plantation, further to the south in the Wilderness area of Spotsylvania County. Lacy convinced the will's executors to seek court direction. The Stafford court upheld the manumissions, but the Virginia Court of Appeals (the name at the time of the Virginia Supreme Court), in a 3 to 2 decision, overturned the 92 conditional manumissions (only upholding Charles' outright manumission). The court denied Coalter's slaves any chance of freedom by ruling that the 1857 Dred Scott decision by the U.S. Supreme Court had declared that enslaved people were property and not persons with choice.

Ellen Mitchell, an enslaved laundress at "Chatham", had known of and counted on Mrs. Coalter's promise of manumission. When Lacy's court case took her freedom away, Mitchell, irate, loudly proclaimed how unfair this denial was, particularly as she feared being sent to a plantation in Monroe, Louisiana. To be rid of her (and the problem she represented), Lacy sold her to a slave trader, James Aler, in Fredericksburg. Aler, active in his church and unsure what to do with Mitchell, allowed her a 90-day pass to leave Fredericksburg in early 1860 on a tour during which she and one of her sons attempted to raise money to buy their freedom for $1000 (~$35,833 in 2025). She gave speeches to church and political groups in Washington City, Baltimore, Philadelphia, New York, and Boston, raising enough money to return to Fredericksburg and buy her own freedom and that of her children. Lacy, impressed, also freed Mitchell's mother. The Mitchell family moved to Cincinnati in the free (i.e., slavery-prohibited) state of Ohio. In the 1860 census, Ellen Mitchell was listed as running a laundry business. Today, some of her descendants still live in that area of Ohio.

The 1860 census indicated that Lacy owned 39 slaves at Chatham and another 49 at his Ellwood plantation, and some enslaved people he rented. An outspoken proponent of slavery, Lacy joined the Confederate Army and rose to the rank of major; his brother Beverly Tucker Lacy (a Presbyterian minister) was the chaplain for General Stonewall Jackson, whose amputated arm was buried at Ellwood Plantation near Hannah Coalter's grave. At least two formerly enslaved people at Chatham served in the U.S. Colored Troops and survived the war, Charles Sprout and Andrew Weaver, and one may have served as a Confederate scout. Thus, slavery at Chatham ended in 1865 as a result of the Civil War, upon the passage of the constitutional amendment abolishing the institution.

National Park Service historians and others continue to research, seeking to locate the former slave quarters. As discussed below, the property was extensively damaged during the Civil War. An 1862 sketch by a Unionist New Jersey soldier during the Civil War shows some buildings at the Chatham site that were long gone by the time historians began speculating that most slave dwellings were likely to be in the "rear" or the field-side area of the estate. This area had been cultivated since the slave days, and in the 20th century, new structures were built there. The recently discovered sketch shows structures to the south side of the manor house, in an area across a ravine away from the central area of the property. A re-examination of old photographs shows the faint rooflines of structures in that area, which may indicate the location of previously unconfirmed slave dwellings.

== American Civil War ==
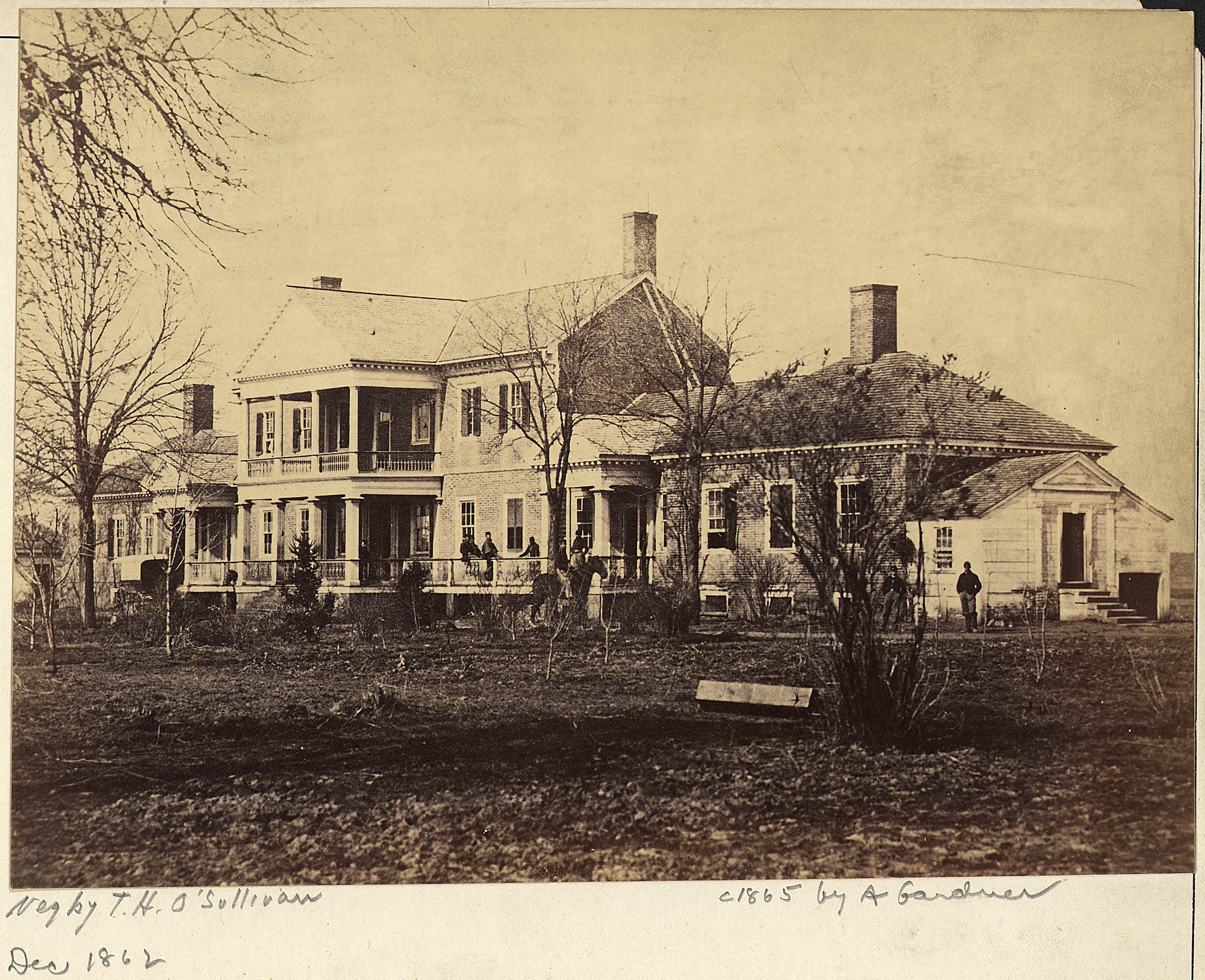
Chatham Manor, 1862. From the National Archives and Records Administration.

The Civil War brought change and destruction to Chatham. As discussed above, the house was owned by James Horace Lacy (1823–1906), a former schoolteacher who had married Churchill Jones's niece. As a planter, Lacy sympathized with the South, and at the age of 37, he left Chatham to serve the Confederacy as a staff officer. He served on the staff of General Gustavus W. Smith at the Battle of Seven Pines, and also served as field transportation inspector in the Trans-Mississippi Department. His wife and children remained at Chatham until the spring of 1862 when Union troops' arrival forced them to abandon the building and move in with relatives across the river in soon-beleaguered Fredericksburg, and after its fall later to Pulaski County.

For much of the next thirteen months, Chatham was occupied by the Union army; orders, reports, and letters referred to it as the "Lacy House". Northern officers initially used the mansion as a headquarters. In April 1862, General Irvin McDowell brought 30,000 men to Fredericksburg and supervised the repair of the Richmond, Fredericksburg and Potomac Railroad and construction of several bridges across the Rappahannock River from Chatham. McDowell planned to use the new bridges to march south and join forces with the Army of the Potomac outside Richmond.

President Abraham Lincoln journeyed to Fredericksburg to confer with McDowell about the movement, meeting with the general and his staff at Chatham. His visit gave Chatham the distinction of being one of three houses visited by both Lincoln and Washington (the other two are Mount Vernon and Berkeley Plantation on the James River east of Richmond.) While at Chatham, Lincoln went to Fredericksburg, walked its streets, and visited a New York regiment encamped on what would become known as "Marye's Heights" during a later battle.

Seven months after Lincoln's visit, fighting again erupted at Fredericksburg. In November 1862, General Ambrose E. Burnside brought the 120,000-man Army of the Potomac to Fredericksburg. Using pontoon bridges, Burnside crossed the Rappahannock River below Chatham, seized Fredericksburg, and launched a series of bloody assaults against Lee's Confederates, who held the high ground behind the town. One of Burnside's top generals, Edwin Sumner, observed the battle from Chatham while U.S. artillery batteries shelled the Confederates from adjacent bluffs. Furthermore, a German Military Observer, Count Zeppelin, from Chatham's lawn, sent up a reconnaissance balloon with a soldier to observe the battle, an incidence he later often recounted after starting his aircraft factory.

The Battle of Fredericksburg became a disastrous Union defeat. Burnside suffered 12,600 casualties, many of whom were brought back to Chatham and the nearby Conway House (Falmouth, Virginia) for care. For several days, army surgeons operated on hundreds of soldiers inside the house. Assisting them were volunteers, including the poet Walt Whitman, Clara Barton (who later founded the American chapter of the International Red Cross), and Dr. Mary Edwards Walker (as of 2015 the only woman awarded the Medal of Honor).

Whitman had come to Chatham searching for a brother wounded in the fighting. The carnage shocked him. He later wrote a published description that, outside the house, at the foot of a tree, he noticed "a heap of amputated feet, legs, arms, hands, etc.-about a load for a one-horse cart. Several dead bodies lie near," he added, "each covered with its brown woolen blanket." More than 130 Union soldiers died at Chatham and were initially buried on the grounds. After the war, their bodies were removed to the Fredericksburg National Cemetery. Years later, when three additional bodies were discovered, the remains were buried at Chatham at the outskirts of the again-famous gardens, in graves marked by granite stones lying flush to the ground.

In the winter following the battle, the U.S. Army camped in Stafford County, behind Chatham. The Confederate army occupied Spotsylvania County, across the river. Opposing pickets patrolled the riverfront, keeping a wary eye on their foe. Occasionally the men would trade newspapers and other articles using miniature sailboats. When not on duty, Union pickets slept at Chatham; Dorothea Dix of the United States Sanitary Commission operated a soup kitchen in the house. As the winter progressed and firewood became scarce, some soldiers tore paneling from the walls for fuel, exposing the underlying plaster. Some of the soldiers' pencil graffiti is still visible, with additional scrawls deciphered by Park Service staff.

Military activity resumed in the spring. In April, the new Union commander, General Joseph Hooker, led most of the army upriver, crossing behind Lee's troops. Other portions remained in Stafford County, including John Gibbons' division at Chatham. The Confederates marched out to meet Hooker's main force, and for a week fighting raged around a country crossroad known as Chancellorsville. At the same time, Union troops crossed the Rappahannock at Fredericksburg and drove a Confederate force off Marye's Heights, behind the town. Many of the 1,000 casualties suffered by the Union army in that 1863 engagement were sent back to Chatham, which again served as a hospital.

== Postwar years ==
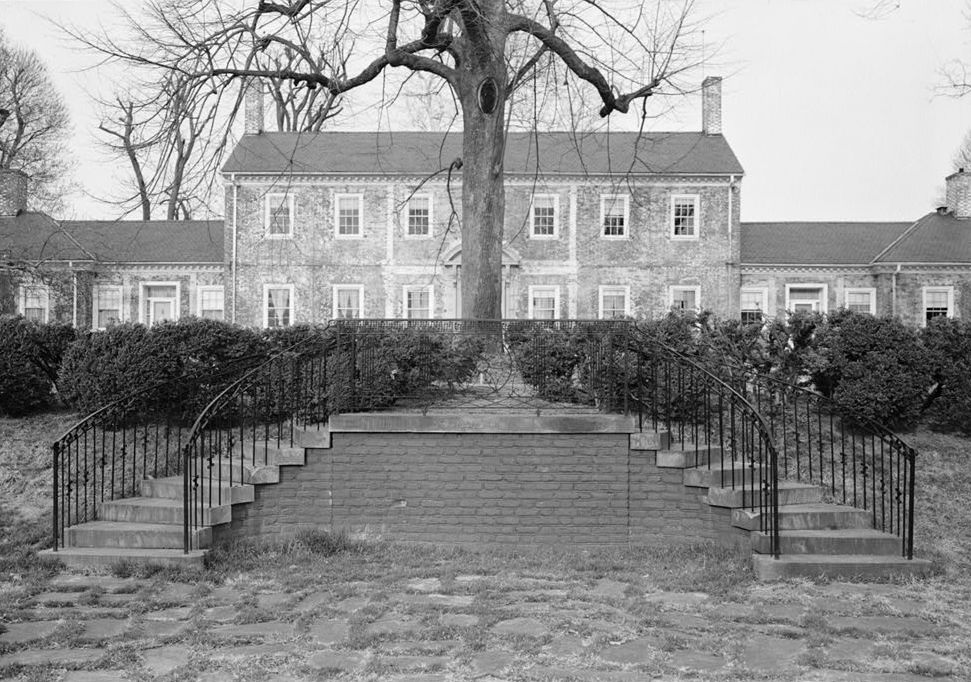
Chatham Manor, Historic American Buildings Survey

By the time the Civil War ended in 1865, Chatham was desolate and severely damaged. When the Lacys returned in November 1865, over 750 panes of glass had been broken, blood stains spotted on the floors, graffiti marred its bare plaster walls, and much of the interior wood paneling had been removed for firewood. In addition, the surrounding forests had been cut down for fuel, the gardens and several outbuildings were damaged or destroyed, and the lawn had been used as a graveyard. Some of their furniture had been evacuated, but the transport boat sank in the Rappahannock, ruining much of it. Over the subsequent years, the Union Burial Corps removed many soldiers' remains from the gardens and lawn for reburial at the new national cemetery in Fredericksburg. Unable to maintain their home properly without enslaved people, they moved to their house known as "Ellwood" and sold Chatham in 1872 to a Pennsylvania banker for $23,900 (~$556,396 in 2024). Betty Lacy helped found the Ladies Memorial Association of Fredericksburg, establishing the Confederate Cemetery, and her husband traveled and made speeches to raise money.

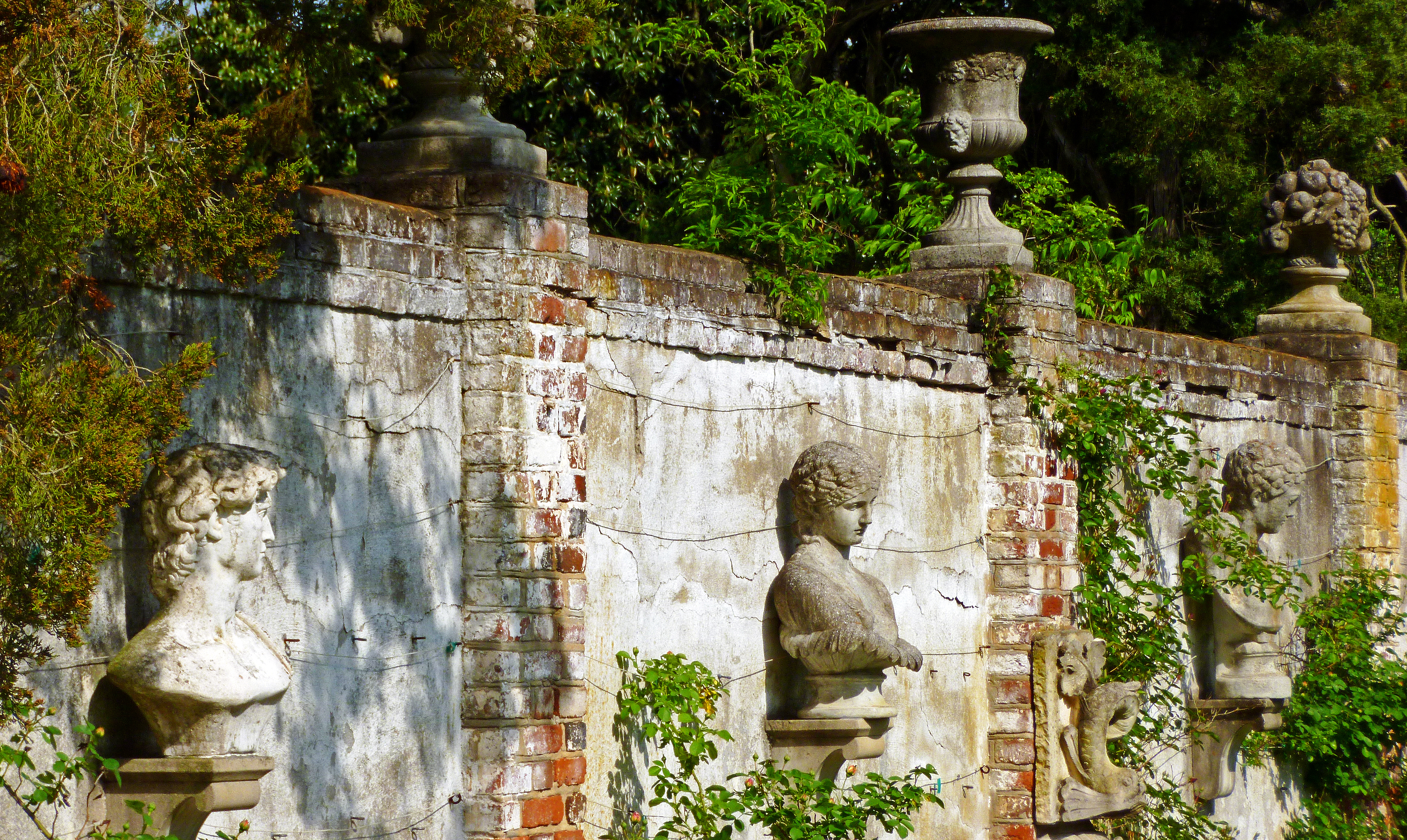
A portion of the east garden wall of the 20th century English-style garden at Chatham Manor, a former plantation near Fredericksburg, Virginia.

The property had a succession of owners until the 1920s when General Daniel Bradford Devore (1860–1956) and his wife, Helen Stewart Devore, undertook its restoration (and made significant changes). Their restoration re-oriented the house away from the west front on the river (no longer the main transportation route); the east entrance became the main entrance, easily reached by automobile. They also added a large, walled English-style garden designed by the noted landscape architect Ellen Biddle Shipman on the east side. As a result of the DeVores' efforts, Chatham regained its place among Virginia's finest homes. However, the DeVores sold Chatham in 1931 to move to Washington D.C., where they built a townhouse later also designated a historic site (and once offered to become the official residence of the Chief Justice of the U.S. Supreme Court).

Today the house and the 85 acres (340,000 m^{2}) of surrounding grounds are open to the public. The last private owners, Northern Neck native and General Motors executive John Lee Pratt and his wife, purchased the Chatham estate (shrunken to 256 acres) from the Devores in 1931 for $150,000 (~$2.48 million in 2024) cash. They were looking ahead to retirement. During World War II, Pratt served as one of President Roosevelt's "dollar-a-year" men. Pratt met and had as visitors Generals George Marshall and Dwight Eisenhower, among many others, essentially to get away from Washington to relax and go duck hunting. Chatham's distinction thus continued during their ownership, as the Pratts did retire to the home and used it as a working "gentleman's" farm. However, he continued to serve on the General Motors Board of Directors until 1968.

Upon Pratt's death in 1975, he bequeathed land around the mansion to Stafford County for parks and a large section to the region's YMCA. This also left the manor house and approximately 30 acres (120,000 m^{2}) surrounding it to the National Park Service (NPS), which uses it as the headquarters for the Fredericksburg and Spotsylvania National Military Park.

Five rooms are open as a (free) museum during designated hours (with an explanatory video tour); the grounds are open to the public. The rest of the houses and outbuildings serve as administrative offices and maintenance facilities. In 2014, the National Park Service undertook tree removal designed to improve the vistas to and from Chatham. This increased the house's visibility from the city and restored the view to what it had been during the Civil War and preceding decades.

Since 2012 the Friends of Chatham, a 501(c)3 non-profit organization, has provided additional support for preserving the historic house and its grounds. Partnering with local Rotary and garden clubs, the Friends group supplements NPS-budgeted services by providing extensive garden maintenance and plantings. It has also undertaken repairs of the 1940s-era summer house at the edge of the gardens and a statue of Pan in a scenic gazebo overlooking the city, which vandals damaged in 2002, and has begun repairing all 80-plus windows in the original house and outbuildings.

== Gallery ==
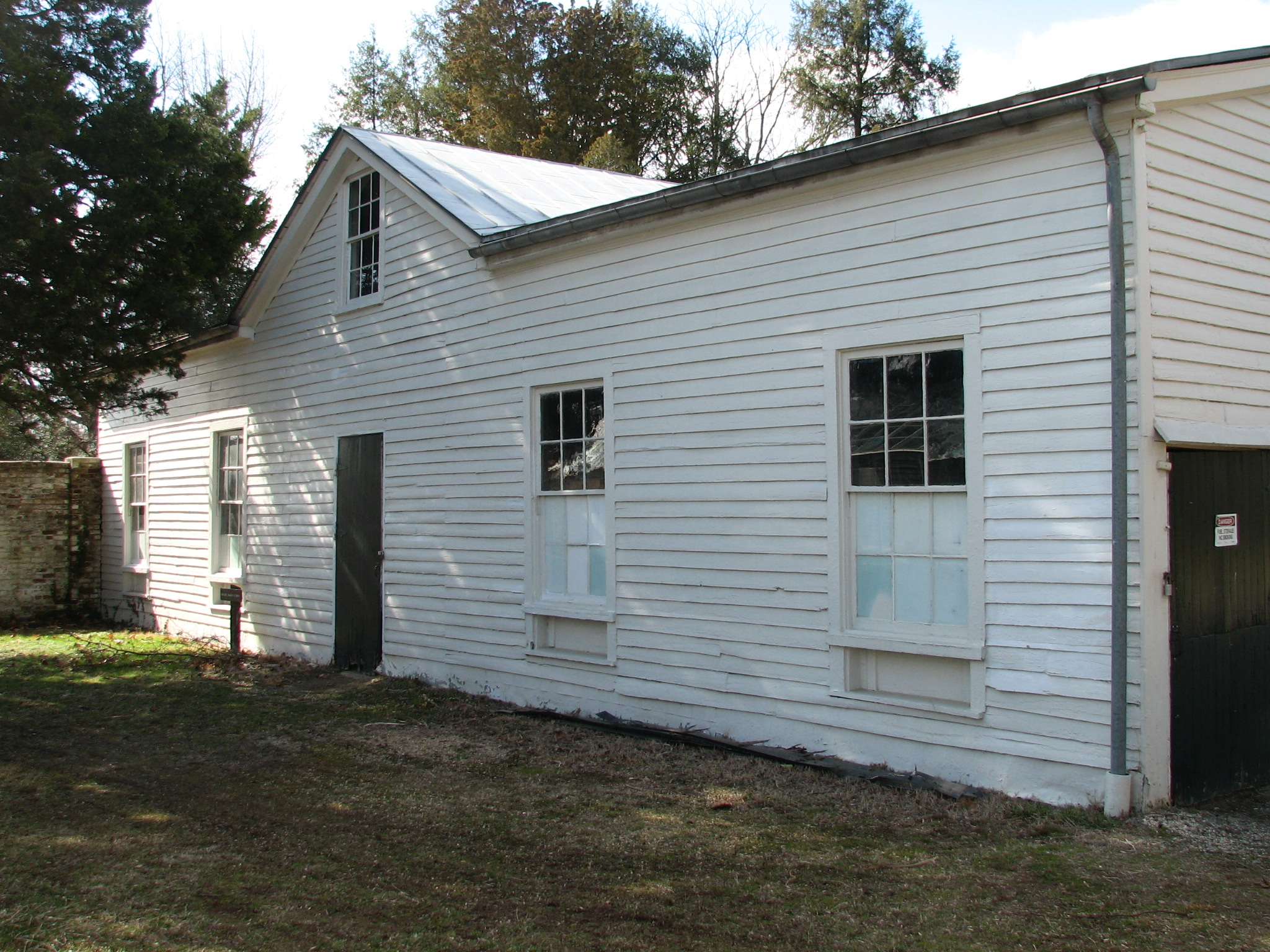
Dairy Barn (c.1900)

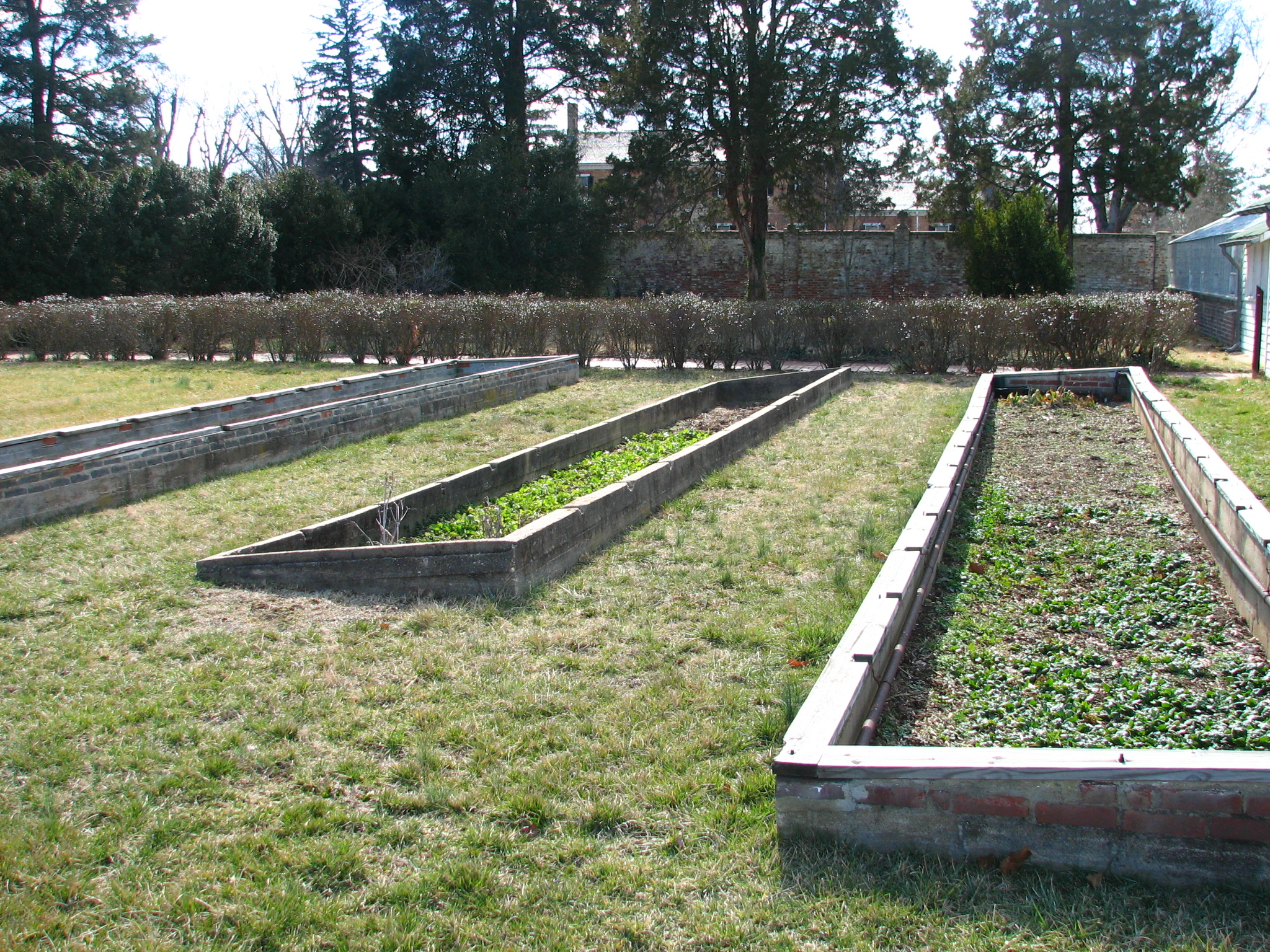
Garden Seedling Cold Frames(1935)

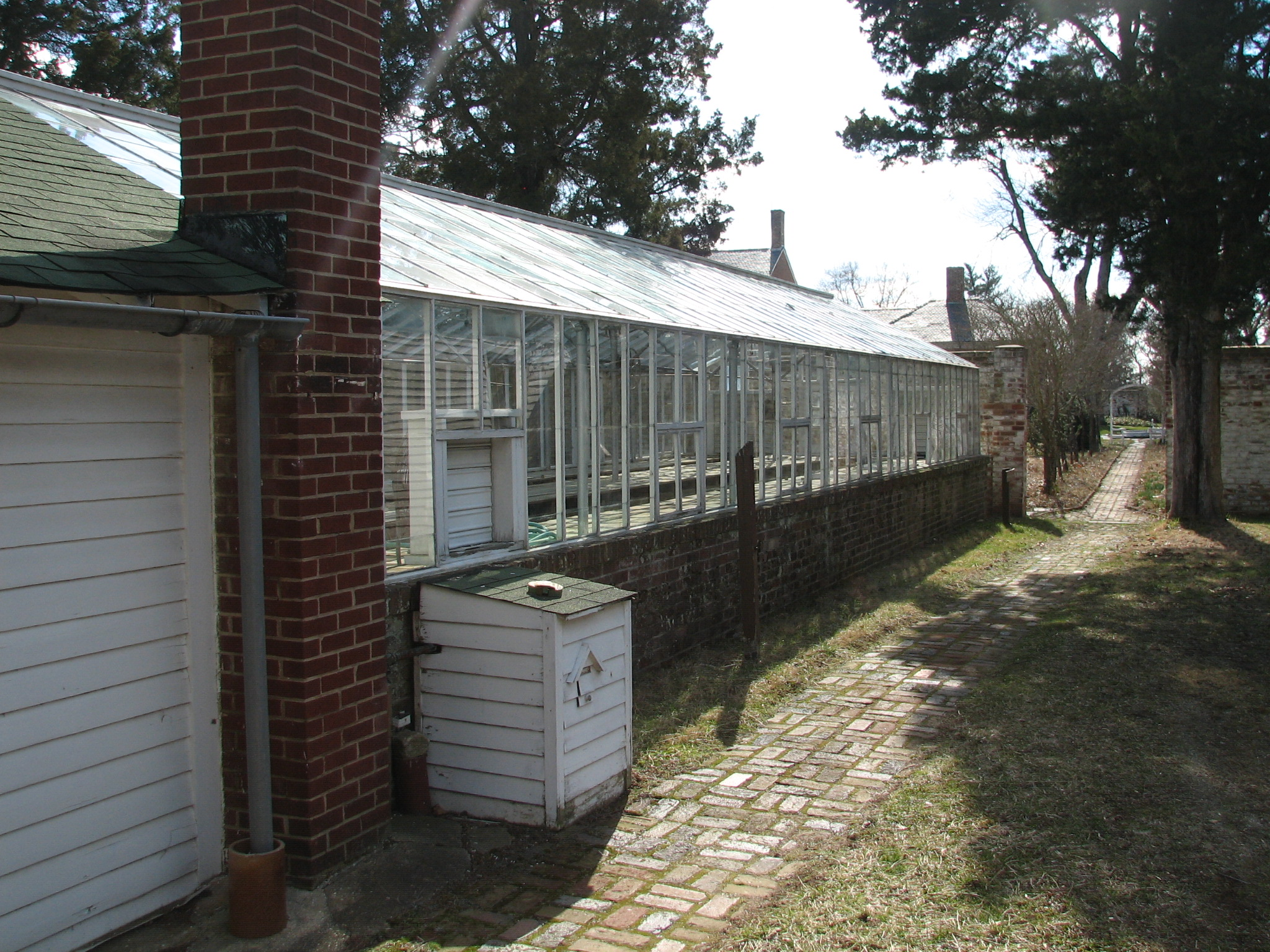
Greenhouse (1935)

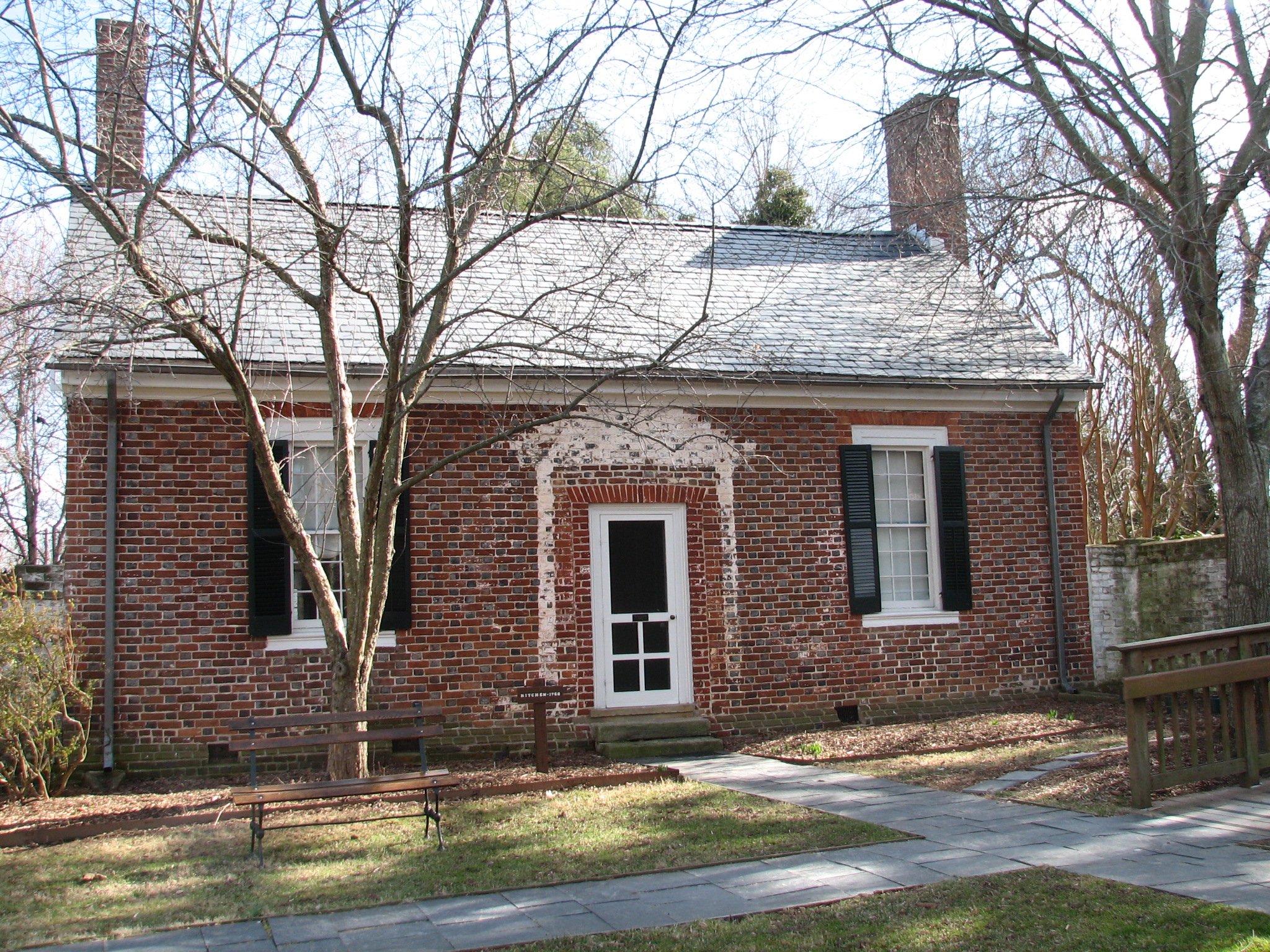
Kitchen (1768)

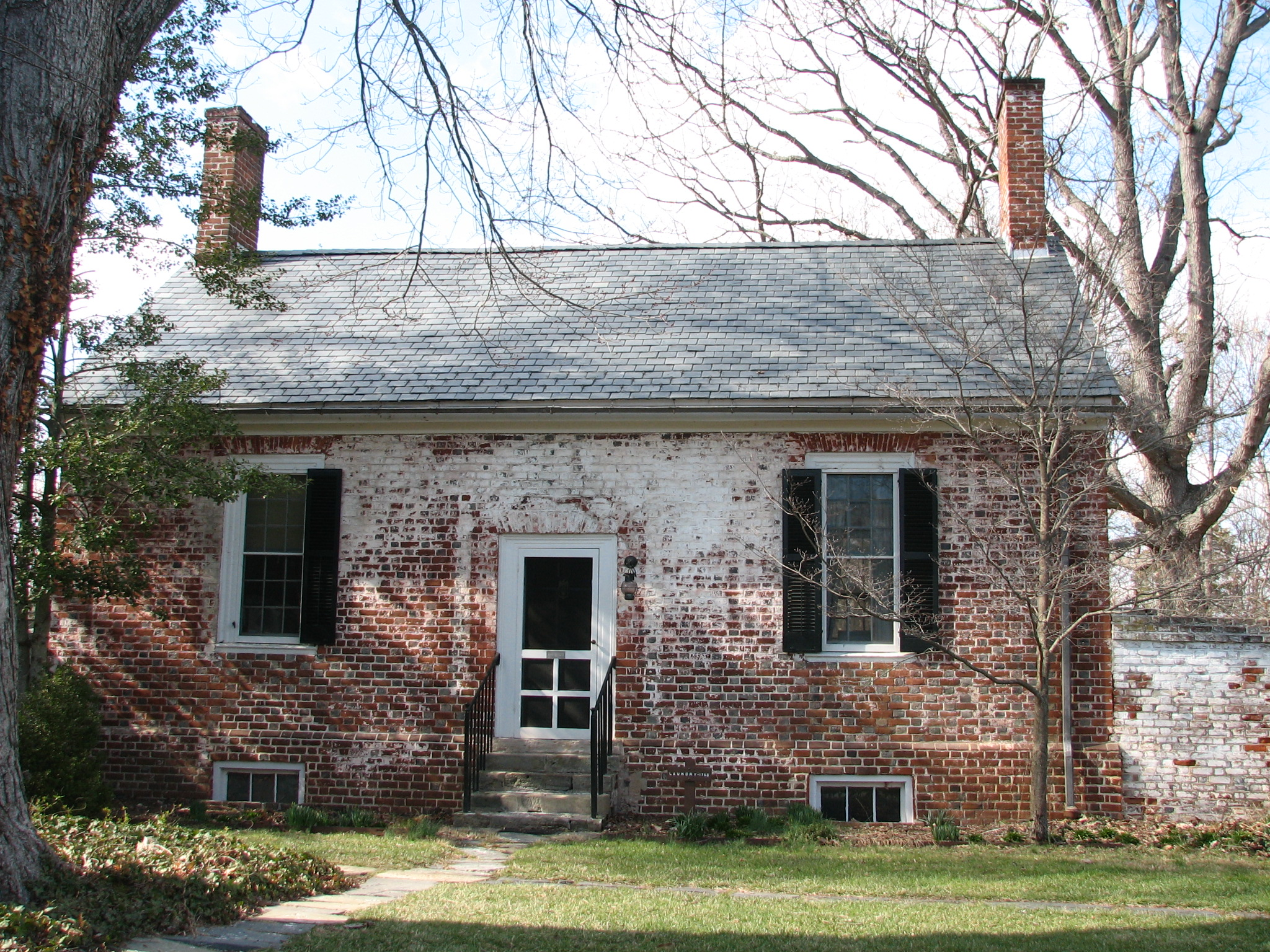
Laundry (1768)

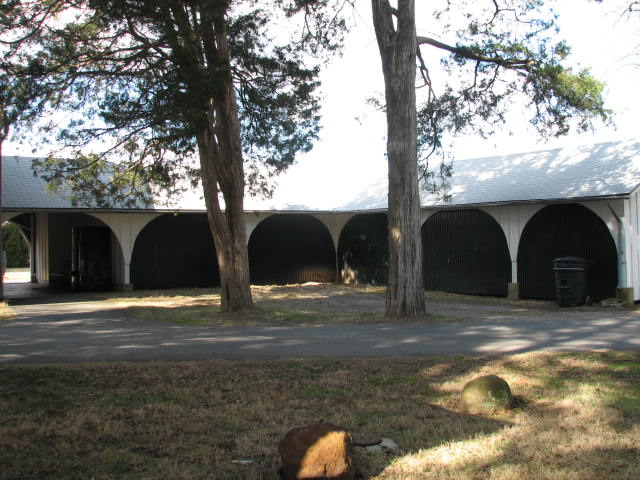
Stable and Garage (c.1900)

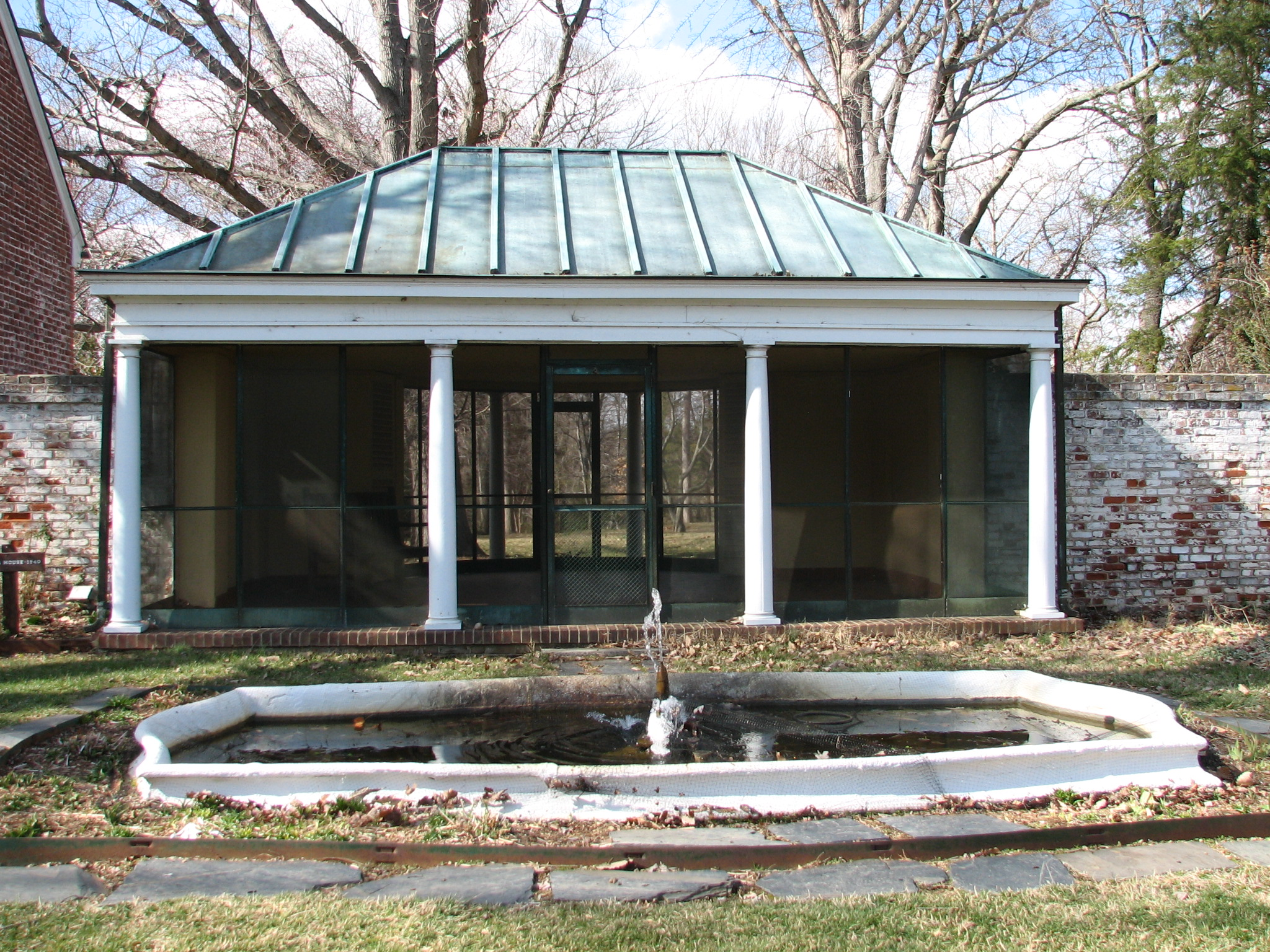
Summer House (1940)

== See also ==
- Battle of Fredericksburg
- Historic houses in Virginia
- Slave rebellions
