= John Coalter =

American judge

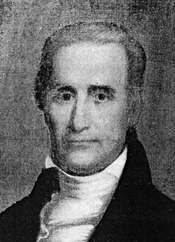
- Portrait of Judge John Coalter

Justice of the Virginia Supreme Court
- In office June 1, 1811 – March 23, 1831

Personal details
- Born: August 20, 1771 Rockbridge County, Virginia, US
- Died: February 2, 1838 (aged 66) Richmond, Virginia, US
- Spouse(s): Maria Rind, Margaret Davenport, Ann Frances Bland Tucker, and Hannah Williamson
- Children: Elizabeth Tucker Coalter Bryan
- Education: College of William and Mary
- Occupation: Lawyer, plantation owner, judge

John Coalter (August 20, 1771 – February 2, 1838) was a Virginia lawyer, plantation owner and judge, who served almost twenty years in the Virginia Supreme Court of Appeals.

== Early and family life ==
Coalter was born in Rockbridge County, Virginia to Michael Coalter and his wife Elizabeth Moore. He worked on the family farm, and received some education at the private Liberty Hall Academy (which later evolved into Washington College and long after his death into Washington and Lee University). Coalter moved across the state to Williamsburg, where he became a tutor in the family of Judge St. George Tucker and worked without pay in exchange for legal education from Judge Tucker and George Wythe at the College of William and Mary, from which Coalter graduated in 1789.

Coalter married four times. His first three wives were: Maria Rind (married 1790 in Williamsburg, died 1792), Margaret Davenport (married and died 1795 in Williamsburg) and Ann Frances Bland Tucker (daughter of St. George Tucker, born 1779, married 1802 and died 1813). His first two wives died in childbirth, and his only children came from his third marriage. His final wife was widow and heiress Hannah Jones Williamson, whom Coalter married in February 1822 and who survived him.

== Career ==
Upon graduation and admission to the Virginia bar, Coalter returned to the Shenandoah Valley and settled in Staunton, Virginia, where he began his legal practice. After serving as the Commonwealth's Attorney (prosecutor) for several years, Coalter was appointed to the General District court for Staunton in 1809. On May 11, 1811, the Virginia General Assembly elevated him to the Supreme Court of Appeals of Virginia.

In the 1820 U.S. Federal Census, his household consisted of two white persons and five slaves. Around 1821, Coalter moved his family to Richmond, Virginia. After marrying the widow and heiress Hannah Jones Williamson the following February, Coalter also operated and occasionally lived at "Chatham Manor" near Fredericksburg, Virginia, which his fourth wife actually inherited from her father William Jones after his death in 1845, years after Coalter's death. In the 1830 U.S. Federal Census, Coalter's household consisted of two white males (him and the overseer), six white females and 86 slaves.

== Death and legacy ==
Coalter died in Richmond on February 2, 1838. His and his last father-in-law's demise led to legal complications, as his widow Hannah Coalter wanted to free the slaves she inherited, which was not permitted at the time, although she had drafted a will to expressly permit such (and to ensure the freed slaves would not drain government resources as required by statute) and had it redrafted by acclaimed lawyers before she died in 1857. Moreover, her father had remarried after her mother's death and lived on the other side of Fredericksburg at Ellwood Manor (which had been founded by her father and his brother) during his final years. Hannah had a very much younger half-sister Betty, who married one of the slaveholding Lacy brothers who operated Ellwood and wanted Chatham as well. Horace Lacy (on his wife's behalf) contested Hannah's will, and while he lost in the Fredericksburg Court, he won in the Virginia Supreme Court, and so owned about 249 slaves in 1860, just before the American Civil War. Hannah and her disabled daughter from a previous marriage would be buried at Ellwood Manor, and Chatham Manor would become a Union headquarters and later hospital, and its slaves freed during that war.

Like the Lacy brothers, Coalter's grandsons (sons of his daughter Elizabeth Tucker Coalter Bryan who moved to Gloucester, Virginia) John Randolph Bryan (1841-1917), St. George Tucker Coalter Bryan (1843-1916) and Joseph Bryan (1845-1908) would become Confederate States Army officers in that war, but survive the conflict.
