= Hellhound on His Trail =

2010 non-fiction book by Hampton Sides

Hellhound on His Trail: The Electrifying Account of the Largest Manhunt in American History
- Author: Hampton Sides
- Language: English
- Genre: Nonfiction /American history / True crime//civil rights
- Publisher: Doubleday
- Publication date: 2010
- Publication place: United States
- Pages: 459
- ISBN: 978-0385523929

Hellhound on His Trail (Doubleday), 2010, is a nonfiction book written by author Hampton Sides, focusing on the characters and events surrounding the assassination of Martin Luther King Jr. Using multiple narratives, Hellhound is an attempt at exploring the psychology and emotion that dominated and divided the United States during the Civil Rights Movement.

== Synopsis ==
The book examines the assassination of civil rights activist Martin Luther King Jr., the manhunt for James Earl Ray, and the nation's reaction. Sides looks into the background of Ray, including his usage of several aliases, including "Eric Starvo Galt". He questions Ray's ability to gain this many aliases on his own and whether or not he may have had an accomplice at some point in time, which Sides believes was very likely.

== Reception ==
Critical reception for Hellhound on His Trail has been mostly positive. The Daily Telegraph and The Washington Post both praised the work, with The Daily Telegraph calling it "an elegant tale of murder and pursuit, but might have been so much more." The New York Times and The Guardian were slightly more mixed in their reviews. Both wrote overall favorable reviews, but remarked that there were aspects that the author could have explored further.

== Film adaptation ==
Black Label Media will produce and direct a film adaption, with a spring 2018 target for start of production. The script will be adapted by Scott Cooper who will also direct the film.

== See also ==
- James Earl Ray
- Assassination of Martin Luther King, Jr.
