= S. C. Gwynne =

American nonfiction writer

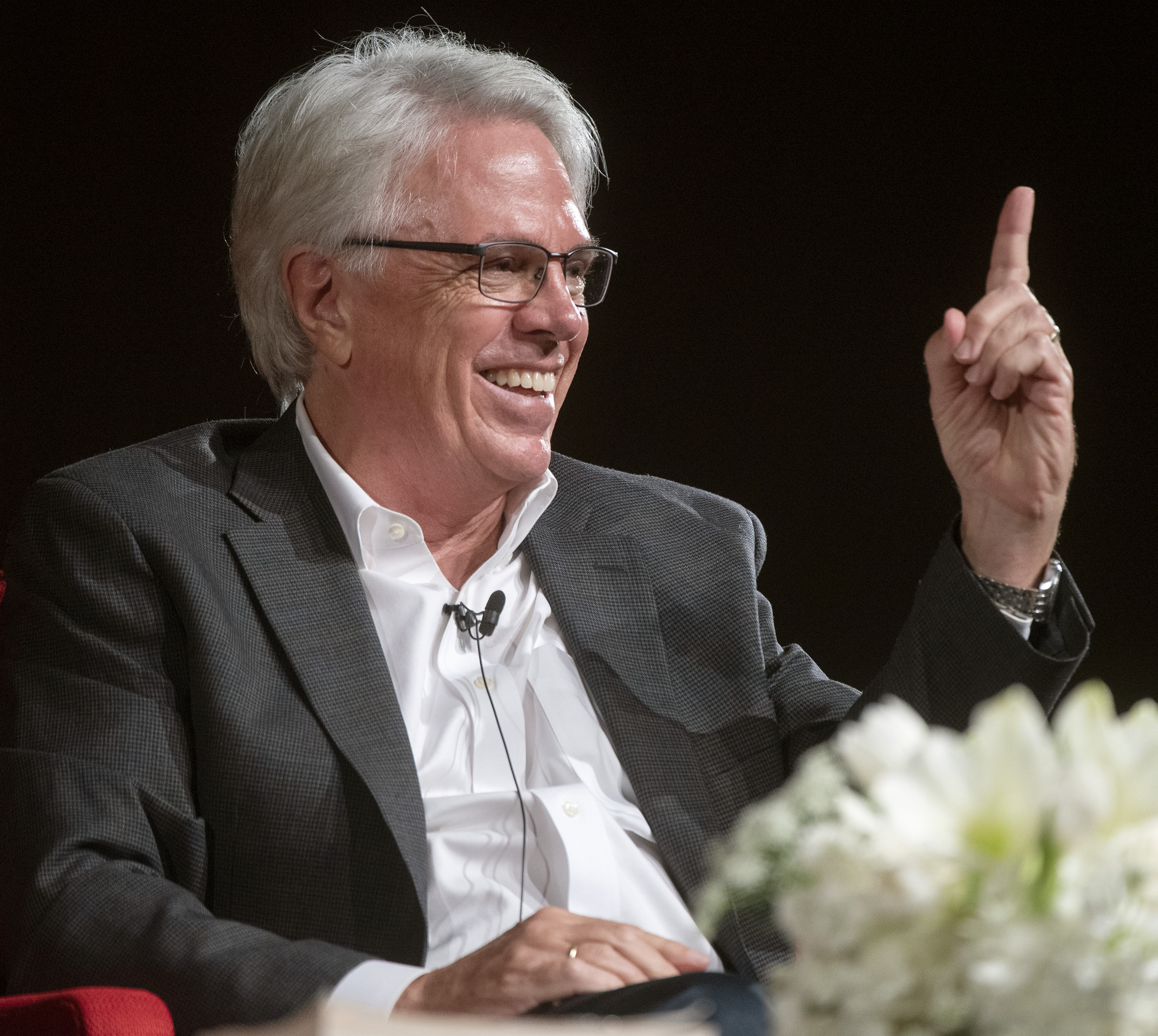
- Education: Princeton University
- Writing career
- Genres: non-fiction
- Notable awards: Gerald Loeb Award; 1992

Samuel C. Gwynne III is an American writer. He holds a bachelor's degree in history from Princeton University and a master's degree in writing from Johns Hopkins University.

== Life and career ==
Gwynne was born in Worcester, Massachusetts, to Sam Gwynne Jr., and grew up mainly in New Canaan, Connecticut. He was educated at The Hill School, then majored in history at Princeton University, graduating in 1974. He also has a master's degree in writing from Johns Hopkins University, where he was awarded a graduate fellowship and studied under novelist John Barth. He lives in Austin, Texas with his wife, the artist Katie Maratta.

Prior to his career as a journalist and historian, Gwynne was a French teacher at Gilman School in Baltimore, Maryland. He was an international banker with both Ameritrust in Cleveland, Ohio and First Interstate Bank in Los Angeles and traveled extensively overseas.

He worked for Time magazine as a correspondent, bureau chief, and senior editor. He was later executive editor at Texas Monthly. His journalism has appeared in the New York Times, Harper's, Los Angeles Times, Outside Magazine, Dallas Morning News, California Magazine, and the Wall Street Journal, among others. His New York Times Bestseller Empire of the Summer Moon (2010) was a finalist for the Pulitzer Prize in the General Nonfiction category and a finalist for the National Book Critics Circle Award. On October 5, 2024, the Comanche Nation passed a resolution denouncing the book. His book Rebel Yell, a biography of Stonewall Jackson – also a New York Times Bestseller – was a finalist for the PEN Award for Literary Biography and for the National Book Critics Circle Award in history. He is also the author of The Perfect Pass: American Genius and the Reinvention of Football (2016), and, most recently, Hymns of the Republic: the Story of The Final Year of the American Civil War (2019). His newest book, His Majesty's Airship: The Life and Tragic Death of the World's Largest Flying Machine, was released on May 2, 2023.

== Works ==
- Selling Money, Weidenfeld & Nicolson, 1986, ISBN 9781555840051.
- The Outlaw Bank: A Wild Ride into the Secret Heart of BCCI, Random House, 1993
- Empire of the Summer Moon: Quanah Parker and the Rise and Fall of the Comanches, the Most Powerful Indian Tribe in American History, Scribner, 2010, ISBN 9781849018203.
- Rebel Yell: The Violence, Passion, and Redemption of Stonewall Jackson. Scribner. 30 September 2014. ISBN 978-1-4516-7328-9.
- The Perfect Pass: American Genius and the Reinvention of Football, Scribner, 2016, ISBN 9781501116193
- Hymns of the Republic: The Story of the Final Year of the American Civil War, Scribner, 2019, ISBN 9781501116223
- His Majesty's Airship: The Life and Tragic Death of the World's Largest Flying Machine, Scribner, 2023. ISBN 9781982168278

== Awards ==
- Gerald Loeb Award for Magazines for a series of articles on the BCCI scandal
- Jack Anderson Award For Best Investigative Reporting
- National Headliners Club Award for Reporting
- Oklahoma Book Award
- Texas Book Award
- John Hancock award for Excellence in Financial Reporting
- National City and Regional Magazine Award for Writer of the Year
- Selected for "Best American Crime Writing" 2006
- Finalist for 2011 Pulitzer Prize in General Nonfiction (Empire of the Summer Moon: Quanah Parker and the Rise and Fall of the Comanches, the Most Powerful Indian Tribe in American History)
