= February 27 =

February 27 this year in various calendars
- Friday, 27 February 2026
Akan	Monofie
Armenian	12 Areg 1475
Aztec	Tecuilhuitontli 8, 10 Cōzcacuāuhtli
Babylonian	9 Shabatu, 2336 SE
Balinese pawukon	Menga, Kajeng, Menala, Keliwon, Maulu, Sukra of Bala, Yama, Dadi, Sri
Bengali	14 Falgun, BS 1432
Chinese	Yang Water Monkey・Ghost Mansion; Fire Horse Year, Month 1, Day 11 (Yushui, 6 days until Jingzhe)
Common Era	27 February 2026 CE
Coptic	20 Meshir, AM 1742
Egyptian	17 Epiphi, 2774 NE
Ethiopian	20 Yakātit, 2018 Amätä Məhrät
French Republican	Décade I, Nonidi de Ventôse de l'Année 234 de la République
Gregorian	27 February, AD 2026
Hebrew	10 Adar, AM 5786
Hindu	Ārdrā・Ayuṣmān; Solar: 15 Phālguna, 1947 SE; Lunisolar: Ekādaśī, Śukla pakṣa of Phālguna, 2082 VE; Rāudra・5126 KY・1,872,633
Icelandic	Föstudagur, 6 Góa 2025
Islamic	10 Ramadan, AH 1447 (using tabular method)
ISO week date	2026-W09-5
Japanese	11 Mutsuki, Reiwa 8 (Usui, 6 days until Keichitsu)
Julian	14 February, AD 2026 (AM 7534)
Julian day	2461099
Korean	11 Horangidal, 4359 DE
Maya	13.0.13.6.16; 14 Kayab, 10 Cib
Roman	ante diem XVI Kalendas Martias, MMDCCLXXIX AUC
Solar Hijri	8 Esfand, SH 1404
Tibetan	11 mchu, me pho rta 2153 or 1772 or 1000

<<	February					>>
Su	Mo	Tu	We	Th	Fr	Sa
1	2	3	4	5	6	7
8	9	10	11	12	13	14
15	16	17	18	19	20	21
22	23	24	25	26	27	28
2026

February 27 in recent years
2026 (Friday)
2025 (Thursday)
2024 (Tuesday)
2023 (Monday)
2022 (Sunday)
2021 (Saturday)
2020 (Thursday)
2019 (Wednesday)
2018 (Tuesday)
2017 (Monday)

February 27 is the 58th day of the year in the Gregorian calendar; 307 days remain until the end of the year (308 in leap years).

== Events ==
=== Pre-1600 ===
- 380 – Edict of Thessalonica: Emperor Theodosius I and his co-emperors Gratian and Valentinian II declare their wish that all Roman citizens convert to Nicene Christianity.
- 425 – The University of Constantinople is founded by Emperor Theodosius II at the urging of his wife Aelia Eudocia.
- 907 – Abaoji, chieftain of the Yila tribe, is named khagan of the Khitans.
- 1560 – The Treaty of Berwick is signed by England and the Lords of the Congregation of Scotland, establishing the terms under which English armed forces were to be permitted in Scotland in order to expel occupying French troops.
- 1594 – Henry IV is crowned King of France.

=== 1601–1900 ===
- 1617 – Sweden and the Tsardom of Russia sign the Treaty of Stolbovo, ending the Ingrian War and shutting Russia out of the Baltic Sea.
- 1626 – Yuan Chonghuan is appointed Governor of Liaodong, after leading the Chinese into a great victory against the Manchurians under Nurhaci.
- 1776 – American Revolutionary War: The Battle of Moore's Creek Bridge in North Carolina breaks up a Loyalist militia.
- 1782 – American Revolutionary War: The House of Commons of Great Britain votes against further war in America.
- 1801 – Pursuant to the District of Columbia Organic Act of 1801, Washington, D.C. is placed under the jurisdiction of the U.S. Congress.
- 1809 – Action of 27 February 1809: Captain Bernard Dubourdieu captures HMS Proserpine.
- 1812 – Argentine War of Independence: Manuel Belgrano raises the Flag of Argentina in the city of Rosario for the first time.
- 1812 – Poet Lord Byron gives his first address as a member of the House of Lords, in defense of Luddite violence against Industrialism in his home county of Nottinghamshire.
- 1844 – The Dominican Republic gains independence from Haiti.
- 1859 – United States representative Daniel Sickles, after learning of an affair between his wife and United States Attorney Philip Barton Key II, murders him in Washington, D.C.
- 1860 – Abraham Lincoln makes a speech at Cooper Union in the city of New York that plays an important role in his election to the Presidency.
- 1864 – American Civil War: The first Northern prisoners arrive at the Confederate prison at Andersonville, Georgia.
- 1870 – The current flag of Japan is first adopted as the national flag for Japanese merchant ships.
- 1881 – First Boer War: The Battle of Majuba Hill takes place.
- 1898 – King George I of Greece survives an assassination attempt.
- 1900 – Second Boer War: In South Africa, British military leaders receive an unconditional notice of surrender from Boer General Piet Cronjé at the Battle of Paardeberg.
- 1900 – The British Labour Party is founded.
- 1900 – Fußball-Club Bayern München is founded.

=== 1901–present ===
- 1902 – Second Boer War: Australian soldiers Harry "Breaker" Morant and Peter Handcock are executed in Pretoria after being convicted of war crimes.
- 1916 – Ocean liner SS Maloja strikes a mine near Dover and sinks with the loss of 155 lives.
- 1921 – The International Working Union of Socialist Parties is founded in Vienna.
- 1922 – A challenge to the Nineteenth Amendment to the United States Constitution, allowing women the right to vote, is rebuffed by the Supreme Court of the United States in Leser v. Garnett.
- 1932 – The Mäntsälä rebellion begins when members of the far-right Lapua Movement start shooting at the social democrats' event in Mäntsälä, Finland.
- 1933 – Reichstag fire: Germany's parliament building in Berlin, the Reichstag, is set on fire; Marinus van der Lubbe, a young Dutch Communist claims responsibility.
- 1939 – United States labor law: The U.S. Supreme Court rules in NLRB v. Fansteel Metallurgical Corp. that the National Labor Relations Board has no authority to force an employer to rehire workers who engage in sit-down strikes.
- 1940 – Martin Kamen and Sam Ruben discover carbon-14.
- 1942 – World War II: Operation Biting launches its overnight raid on the German coastal radar station at Bruneval to retrieve a Würzburg installation.
- 1942 – World War II: During the Battle of the Java Sea, an Allied strike force is defeated by a Japanese task force in the Java Sea in the Dutch East Indies.
- 1943 – The Smith Mine #3 in Bearcreek, Montana, explodes, killing 74 men.
- 1943 – The Holocaust: In Berlin, the Gestapo arrest 1,800 Jewish men with German wives, leading to the Rosenstrasse protest.
- 1951 – The Twenty-second Amendment to the United States Constitution, limiting Presidents to two terms, is ratified.
- 1961 – The first congress of the Spanish Trade Union Organisation is inaugurated.
- 1962 – Vietnam War: Two dissident Republic of Vietnam Air Force pilots bomb the Independence Palace in Saigon in a failed attempt to assassinate South Vietnam President Ngô Đình Diệm.
- 1963 – The Dominican Republic receives its first democratically elected president, Juan Bosch, since the end of the dictatorship led by Rafael Trujillo.
- 1964 – The Government of Italy asks for help to keep the Leaning Tower of Pisa from toppling over.
- 1971 – Doctors in the first Dutch abortion clinic (the Mildredhuis in Arnhem) start performing artificially-induced abortions.
- 1973 – The American Indian Movement occupies Wounded Knee in protest of the federal government.
- 1976 – The former Spanish territory of Western Sahara, under the auspices of the Polisario Front declares independence as the Sahrawi Arab Democratic Republic.
- 1988 – Sumgait pogrom: The Armenian community in Sumgait, Azerbaijan is targeted in a violent pogrom.
- 1991 – Gulf War: U.S. President George H. W. Bush announces that "Kuwait is liberated".
- 2001 – Loganair Flight 670A crashes while attempting to make a water landing in the Firth of Forth in Scotland.
- 2002 – Ryanair Flight 296 catches fire at London Stansted Airport causing minor injuries.
- 2002 – Godhra train burning: A Muslim mob torches a train returning from Ayodhya, killing 59 Hindu pilgrims.
- 2004 – A bombing of a SuperFerry by Abu Sayyaf in the Philippines' worst terrorist attack kills more than 100 passengers.
- 2004 – Shoko Asahara, the leader of the Japanese doomsday cult Aum Shinrikyo, is sentenced to death for masterminding the 1995 Tokyo subway sarin attack.
- 2007 – Chinese stock bubble of 2007: The Shanghai Stock Exchange falls 9%, the largest daily fall in ten years, following speculation about a crackdown on illegal share offerings and trading, and fears about accelerating inflation.
- 2008 – Jemaah Islamiyah terrorist Mas Selamat Kastari escapes from a detention center in Singapore, hiding in Johor, Malaysia until he was recaptured over a year later.
- 2010 – An earthquake measuring 8.8 on the moment magnitude scale strikes central parts of Chile leaving over 500 victims, and thousands injured. The quake triggers a tsunami which strikes Hawaii shortly after.
- 2013 – A shooting takes place at a factory in Menznau, Switzerland, in which five people (including the perpetrator) are killed and five others injured.
- 2015 – Russian politician Boris Nemtsov is assassinated in Moscow while out walking with his girlfriend.
- 2019 – Pakistan Air Force JF-17 Thunder downs Indian pilot Abhinandan Varthaman's Mig-21 in an aerial dogfight and captures him after conducting airstrikes in Jammu and Kashmir.

== Births ==
=== Pre-1600 ===
- 272 – Constantine the Great, Roman emperor (died 337)
- 1343 – Alberto d'Este, Marquis of Ferrara (died 1393)
- 1427 – Ruprecht, Archbishop of Cologne (died 1480)
- 1500 – João de Castro, Portuguese nobleman and fourth viceroy of Portuguese India (died 1548)
- 1535 – Min Phalaung, Burmese monarch (died 1593)
- 1567 – William Alabaster, English poet (died 1640)
- 1572 – Francis II, Duke of Lorraine (died 1632)
- 1575 – John Adolf, Duke of Holstein-Gottorp (died 1616)

=== 1601–1900 ===
- 1622 – Carel Fabritius, Dutch painter (died 1654)
- 1630 – Roche Braziliano, Dutch pirate (died 1671)
- 1659 – William Sherard, English botanist (died 1728)
- 1667 – Ludwika Karolina Radziwiłł, Prussian-Lithuanian wife of Charles III Philip, Elector Palatine (died 1695)
- 1689 – Pietro Gnocchi, Italian composer, director, historian, and geographer (died 1775)
- 1703 – Lord Sidney Beauclerk, English politician (died 1744)
- 1711 – Constantine Mavrocordatos, Ottoman ruler (died 1769)
- 1724 – Frederick Michael, Count Palatine of Zweibrücken (died 1767)
- 1732 – Jean de Dieu-Raymond de Cucé de Boisgelin, French cardinal (died 1804)
- 1746 – Louis-Jérôme Gohier, French politician, French Minister of Justice (died 1830)
- 1748 – Anders Sparrman, Swedish physician and activist (died 1820)
- 1767 – Jacques-Charles Dupont de l'Eure, French lawyer and politician, 24th Prime Minister of France (died 1855)
- 1779 – Thomas Hazlehurst, English businessman, founded Hazlehurst & Sons (died 1842)
- 1789 – Manuel Rodríguez Erdoíza, Chilean lawyer and politician, Chilean Minister of National Defense (died 1818)
- 1795 – José Antonio Navarro, American merchant and politician (died 1871)
- 1799 – Edward Belcher, British naval officer, hydrographer, and explorer (died 1877)
- 1799 – Frederick Catherwood, British artist, architect and explorer (died 1854)
- 1807 – Henry Wadsworth Longfellow, American poet and educator (died 1882)
- 1809 – Jean-Charles Cornay, French missionary and saint (died 1837)
- 1816 – William Nicholson, English-Australian politician, 3rd Premier of Victoria (died 1865)
- 1847 – Ellen Terry, English actress (died 1928)
- 1848 – Hubert Parry, English composer and historian (died 1918)
- 1859 – Bertha Pappenheim, Austrian-German activist and author (died 1936)
- 1863 – Joaquín Sorolla, Spanish painter (died 1923)
- 1863 – George Herbert Mead, American sociologist and philosopher (died 1930)
- 1864 – Eemil Nestor Setälä, Finnish linguist and politician, Finnish Minister for Foreign Affairs (died 1935)
- 1867 – Irving Fisher, American economist and statistician (died 1947)
- 1867 – Wilhelm Peterson-Berger, Swedish composer and critic (died 1942)
- 1869 – Alice Hamilton, American physician and academic (died 1970)
- 1872 – Alexandru Vaida-Voevod, Romanian politician, Prime Minister of Romania (died 1950)
- 1875 – Vladimir Filatov, Russian-Ukrainian ophthalmologist and surgeon (died 1956)
- 1877 – Adela Verne, English pianist and composer (died 1952)
- 1877 – Joseph Grinnell, American zoologist and biologist (died 1939)
- 1878 – Alvan T. Fuller, American businessman and politician, 50th Governor of Massachusetts (died 1958)
- 1880 – Xenophon Kasdaglis, Greek-Egyptian tennis player (died 1943)
- 1881 – Sveinn Björnsson, Danish-Icelandic lawyer and politician, 1st President of Iceland (died 1952)
- 1881 – L. E. J. Brouwer, Dutch mathematician, philosopher, and academic (died 1966)
- 1886 – Hugo Black, American captain, lawyer, politician, and associate justice of the U.S. Supreme Court (died 1971)
- 1887 – Pyotr Nesterov, Russian captain, pilot, and engineer (died 1914)
- 1888 – Roberto Assagioli, Italian psychiatrist and psychologist (died 1974)
- 1888 – Lotte Lehmann, German-American soprano and actress (died 1976)
- 1888 – Stephen McKenna, English novelist (died 1967)
- 1890 – Mabel Keaton Staupers, American nurse and advocate (died 1989)
- 1891 – David Sarnoff, American businessman, founded RCA (died 1971)
- 1892 – William Demarest, American actor (died 1983)
- 1895 – Miyagiyama Fukumatsu, Japanese sumo wrestler (died 1943)
- 1897 – Marian Anderson, American singer (died 1993)
- 1899 – Charles Best, American-Canadian physiologist and biochemist, co-discovered insulin (died 1978)

=== 1901–present ===
- 1901 – Marino Marini, Italian sculptor and academic (died 1980)
- 1901 – Kotama Okada, Japanese religious leader (died 1974)
- 1902 – Lúcio Costa, French-Brazilian architect and engineer, designed Gustavo Capanema Palace (died 1998)
- 1902 – Gene Sarazen, American golfer and sportscaster (died 1999)
- 1902 – John Steinbeck, American journalist and author, Nobel Prize laureate (died 1968)
- 1903 – Reginald Gardiner, English-American actor and singer (died 1980)
- 1903 – Hans Rohrbach, German mathematician (died 1993)
- 1903 – Joseph B. Soloveitchik, Belarusian-American rabbi and philosopher (died 1993)
- 1904 – James T. Farrell, American author and poet (died 1979)
- 1904 – Yulii Borisovich Khariton, Russian physicist and academic (died 1996)
- 1904 – André Leducq, French cyclist (died 1980)
- 1905 – Tone Peruško, Croatian educator and social worker (died 1967)
- 1905 – Franchot Tone, American actor, singer, and producer (died 1968)
- 1907 – Mildred Bailey, American singer (died 1951)
- 1907 – Momčilo Đujić, Serbian-American priest and commander (died 1999)
- 1910 – Joan Bennett, American actress (died 1990)
- 1910 – Peter De Vries, American journalist and author (died 1993)
- 1910 – Kelly Johnson, American engineer, co-founded Skunk Works (died 1990)
- 1910 – Genrikh Kasparyan, Armenian chess player and composer (died 1995)
- 1911 – Oscar Heidenstam, English bodybuilder (died 1991)
- 1912 – Lawrence Durrell, British author, poet, and playwright (died 1990)
- 1912 – Kusumagraj, Indian author, poet, and playwright (died 1999)
- 1913 – Paul Ricœur, French philosopher and academic (died 2005)
- 1913 – Kazimierz Sabbat, Polish soldier and politician, President of Poland (died 1989)
- 1913 – Irwin Shaw, American author and screenwriter (died 1984)
- 1915 – Denis Whitaker, Canadian general, football player, and businessman (died 2001)
- 1917 – John Connally, American lieutenant and politician, 39th Governor of Texas and 61st United States Secretary of Treasury (died 1993)
- 1919 – Chick Halbert, American basketball player (died 2013)
- 1919 – Johnny Pesky, American baseball player and manager (died 2012)
- 1920 – Reg Simpson, English cricketer (died 2013)
- 1921 – Theodore Van Kirk, American soldier, pilot, and navigator (died 2014)
- 1922 – Hans Rookmaaker, Dutch historian, author, and scholar (died 1977)
- 1923 – Dexter Gordon, American saxophonist, composer, and actor (died 1990)
- 1925 – Kenneth Koch, American poet, playwright and professor (died 2002)
- 1925 – Pia Sebastiani, Argentine pianist and composer (died 2015)
- 1926 – David H. Hubel, Canadian-American neurophysiologist and academic, Nobel Prize laureate (died 2013)
- 1927 – Aira Samulin, Finnish dancer and entrepreneur (died 2023)
- 1927 – Peter Whittle, English-New Zealand mathematician and theorist (died 2021)
- 1928 – René Clemencic, Austrian composer, recorder player, harpsichordist, conductor and clavichord player (died 2022)
- 1929 – Jack Gibson, Australian rugby league player, coach, and sportscaster (died 2008)
- 1929 – Djalma Santos, Brazilian footballer (died 2013)
- 1929 – Patricia Ward Hales, British tennis player (died 1985)
- 1930 – Jovan Krkobabić, Serbian politician, Deputy Prime Minister of Serbia (died 2014)
- 1930 – Peter Stone, American screenwriter and producer (died 2003)
- 1930 – Paul von Ragué Schleyer, American chemist and academic (died 2014)
- 1930 – Joanne Woodward, American actress
- 1932 – Elizabeth Taylor, English-American actress and humanitarian (died 2011)
- 1932 – David Young, Baron Young of Graffham, English businessman and politician, Secretary of State for Business, Innovation and Skills (died 2022)
- 1933 – Raymond Berry, American football player and coach (died 2026)
- 1933 – Malcolm Wallop, American politician (died 2011)
- 1934 – Vincent Fourcade, French interior designer (died 1992)
- 1934 – N. Scott Momaday, American poet and writer (died 2024)
- 1934 – Ralph Nader, American lawyer, politician, and activist
- 1935 – Mirella Freni, Italian soprano and actress (died 2020)
- 1935 – Uri Shulevitz, American author and illustrator (died 2025)
- 1936 – Ron Barassi, Australian footballer and coach (died 2023)
- 1936 – Sonia Johnson, American feminist activist and author
- 1936 – Roger Mahony, American cardinal
- 1937 – Barbara Babcock, American actress
- 1938 – Jake Thackray, English singer-songwriter, guitarist, and journalist (died 2002)
- 1939 – Don McKinnon, English-New Zealand farmer and politician, 12th Deputy Prime Minister of New Zealand
- 1939 – Peter Revson, American race car driver (died 1974)
- 1940 – Pierre Duchesne, Canadian lawyer and politician, 28th Lieutenant Governor of Quebec
- 1940 – Howard Hesseman, American actor (died 2022)
- 1940 – Bill Hunter, Australian actor (died 2011)
- 1941 – Paddy Ashdown, British soldier and politician (died 2018)
- 1942 – Jimmy Burns, American singer-songwriter and guitarist
- 1942 – Robert H. Grubbs, American chemist and academic, Nobel Prize laureate (died 2021)
- 1942 – Charlayne Hunter-Gault, American journalist
- 1942 – Klaus-Dieter Sieloff, German footballer (died 2011)
- 1943 – Mary Frann, American actress (died 1998)
- 1943 – Morten Lauridsen, American composer and conductor
- 1943 – Carlos Alberto Parreira, Brazilian footballer and manager
- 1944 – Ken Grimwood, American author (died 2003)
- 1944 – Graeme Pollock, South African cricketer and coach
- 1944 – Roger Scruton, English philosopher and writer (died 2020)
- 1947 – Alan Guth, American physicist and cosmologist
- 1947 – Gidon Kremer, Latvian violinist and conductor
- 1947 – Sonia Manzano Vela, Ecuadorian writer
- 1949 – Mary Gibby, British botanist and professor (died 2024)
- 1949 – Debra Monk, American actress, singer, and writer
- 1950 – Annabel Goldie, Scottish lawyer and politician
- 1950 – Julia Neuberger, Baroness Neuberger, English rabbi and politician
- 1951 – Carl A. Anderson, 13th Supreme Knight of the Knights of Columbus
- 1951 – Lee Atwater, American journalist, activist and political strategist (died 1991)
- 1951 – Walter de Silva, Italian car designer
- 1951 – Steve Harley, English singer-songwriter and guitarist (died 2024)
- 1952 – Dwight Jones, American basketball player (died 2016)
- 1953 – Gavin Esler, Scottish journalist and author
- 1953 – Ian Khama, English-Botswanan lieutenant and politician, 4th President of Botswana
- 1953 – Stelios Kouloglou, Greek journalist, author, director and politician
- 1954 – Neal Schon, American rock guitarist and singer-songwriter
- 1955 – Belus Prajoux, Chilean tennis player
- 1956 – Meena Keshwar Kamal, Afghan activist, founded the Revolutionary Association of the Women of Afghanistan (died 1987)
- 1957 – Danny Antonucci, Canadian animator, producer, and screenwriter
- 1957 – Kevin Curran, American screenwriter and television producer (died 2016)
- 1957 – Robert de Castella, Australian runner
- 1957 – Adrian Smith, English guitarist and songwriter
- 1957 – Timothy Spall, English actor
- 1958 – Naas Botha, South African rugby player and sportscaster
- 1958 – Maggie Hassan, American politician, 81st Governor of New Hampshire
- 1960 – Andrés Gómez, Ecuadorian tennis player
- 1960 – Johnny Van Zant, American singer-songwriter
- 1961 – James Worthy, American basketball player and sportscaster
- 1962 – Adam Baldwin, American actor
- 1962 – Grant Show, American actor
- 1963 – Nasty Suicide, Finnish musician and pharmacist
- 1964 – Jeffrey Pasley, American educator and academic
- 1965 – Pedro Chaves, Portuguese racing driver
- 1965 – Noah Emmerich, American actor
- 1966 – Baltasar Kormákur, Icelandic actor, director, and producer
- 1966 – Donal Logue, Canadian actor and director
- 1967 – Jony Ive, English-American industrial designer, former chief design officer of Apple
- 1967 – Dănuț Lupu, Romanian footballer
- 1968 – Matt Stairs, Canadian baseball player and sportscaster
- 1969 – Juan E. Gilbert, American computer scientist, inventor, and academic
- 1970 – Kent Desormeaux, American jockey
- 1970 – Patricia Petibon, French soprano and actress
- 1971 – Sara Blakely, American businesswoman, founded Spanx
- 1971 – Derren Brown, English magician and painter
- 1971 – Roman Giertych, Polish lawyer and politician, Deputy Prime Minister of the Republic of Poland
- 1971 – David Rikl, Czech-English tennis player
- 1971 – Rozonda Thomas, American singer-songwriter, dancer, and actress
- 1972 – Richard Coyle, English actor
- 1973 – Peter Andre, English-Australian singer-songwriter and actor
- 1974 – Carte Goodwin, former United States senator from West Virginia
- 1975 – Aitor González, Spanish racing driver
- 1975 – Prodromos Korkizoglou, Greek decathlete
- 1976 – Ludovic Capelle, Belgian cyclist
- 1976 – Cornelia Ecker, Austrian politician
- 1976 – Tony Gonzalez, American football player
- 1976 – Sergei Semak, Ukrainian-Russian footballer and manager
- 1978 – James Beattie, English footballer and manager
- 1978 – Kakha Kaladze, Georgian footballer and politician
- 1978 – Emelie Öhrstig, Swedish skier and cyclist
- 1978 – Simone Di Pasquale, Italian ballet dancer
- 1980 – Brandon Beemer, American actor
- 1980 – Chelsea Clinton, American journalist and academic
- 1980 – Bobby V, American singer-songwriter
- 1981 – Natalie Grandin, English-South African tennis player
- 1981 – Josh Groban, American singer-songwriter, producer, and actor
- 1981 – Élodie Ouédraogo, Belgian sprinter
- 1982 – Ali Bastian, English actress
- 1982 – Pat Richards, Australian rugby league player
- 1982 – Bruno Soares, Brazilian tennis player
- 1983 – Devin Harris, American basketball player
- 1983 – Kate Mara, American actress
- 1984 – James Augustine, American basketball player
- 1984 – Jumbo Díaz, Dominican baseball player
- 1984 – Akseli Kokkonen, Norwegian ski jumper
- 1984 – Aníbal Sánchez, Venezuelan baseball player
- 1984 – Lotta Schelin, Swedish footballer
- 1984 – Denard Span, American baseball player
- 1985 – Asami Abe, Japanese singer and actress
- 1985 – Diniyar Bilyaletdinov, Russian footballer
- 1985 – Vladislav Kulik, Ukrainian-Russian footballer
- 1985 – Thiago Neves, Brazilian footballer
- 1986 – Yovani Gallardo, Mexican baseball player
- 1986 – Daniel Gibson, American basketball player and coach
- 1986 – Jonathan Moreira, Brazilian footballer
- 1986 – Sandeep Singh, Indian field hockey player
- 1987 – Valeriy Andriytsev, Ukrainian wrestler
- 1987 – Florence Kiplagat, Kenyan runner
- 1988 – Dustin Jeffrey, Canadian ice hockey player
- 1988 – Iain Ramsay, Australian footballer
- 1989 – David Button, English footballer
- 1989 – Lloyd Rigby, English footballer
- 1990 – Chandler Jones, American football player
- 1990 – Adam Morgan, American baseball player
- 1990 – Lindsey Morgan, American actress
- 1991 – Azeem Rafiq, Pakistani cricketer
- 1992 – Meyers Leonard, American basketball player
- 1992 – Ioannis Potouridis, Greek footballer
- 1992 – Jonjo Shelvey, English footballer
- 1992 – Callum Wilson, English footballer
- 1993 – Alphonse Areola, French footballer
- 1994 – Mike Matheson, Canadian ice hockey player
- 1995 – Laura Gulbe, Latvian tennis player
- 1995 – Sergej Milinković-Savić, Serbian footballer
- 1995 – Tomáš Souček, Czech footballer
- 1996 – Chris Godwin, American football player
- 1996 – Ten, Thai singer and dancer
- 1998 – Todd Cantwell, English footballer
- 2002 – Johnny Davis, American basketball player

== Deaths ==
=== Pre-1600 ===
- 640 – Pepin of Landen, Frankish lord (born 580)
- 906 – Conrad the Elder, Frankish nobleman
- 956 – Theophylact, Ecumenical Patriarch of Constantinople (born 917)
- 1167 – Robert of Melun, English theologian and bishop
- 1416 – Eleanor of Castile, queen consort of Navarre (born c. 1363)
- 1425 – Prince Vasily I of Moscow (born 1371)
- 1483 – William VIII of Montferrat (born 1420)
- 1558 – Johann Faber of Heilbronn, controversial Catholic preacher (born 1504)
- 1558 – Kunigunde of Brandenburg-Kulmbach, German Noblewoman (born 1524)

=== 1601–1900 ===
- 1641 – Pau Claris, Catalan lawyer, clergyman and President of the Generalitat, founder of the Catalan Republic (born 1586)
- 1659 – Henry Dunster, English-American clergyman and academic (born 1609)
- 1699 – Charles Paulet, 1st Duke of Bolton, English politician, Lord Lieutenant of Hampshire (born 1625)
- 1706 – John Evelyn, English gardener and author (born 1620)
- 1712 – Sir William Villiers, 3rd Baronet, English politician (born 1645)
- 1720 – Samuel Parris, English-American minister (born 1653)
- 1735 – John Arbuthnot, Scottish physician and polymath (born 1667)
- 1784 – Count of St. Germain, European adventurer (born 1710)
- 1795 – Tanikaze Kajinosuke, Japanese sumo wrestler (born 1750)
- 1844 – Nicholas Biddle, American banker and politician (born 1786)
- 1887 – Alexander Borodin, Russian composer and chemist (born 1833)
- 1892 – Louis Vuitton, French fashion designer and businessman, founded Louis Vuitton (born 1821)

=== 1901–present ===
- 1902 – Harry "Breaker" Morant, English-Australian lieutenant (born 1864)
- 1921 – Schofield Haigh, English cricketer and umpire (born 1871)
- 1931 – Chandra Shekhar Azad, Indian revolutionary (born 1906)
- 1936 – Joshua W. Alexander, American judge and politician, 2nd United States Secretary of Commerce (born 1852)
- 1936 – Ivan Pavlov, Russian physiologist and physician, Nobel Prize laureate (born 1849)
- 1937 – Charles Donnelly (poet), Irish Republican, died in the Spanish Civil War (born 1914)
- 1937 – Hosteen Klah, Navajo artist, medicine man, and weaver (born 1867)
- 1937 – Emily Malbone Morgan, American saint, foundress of the Society of the Companions of the Holy Cross (born 1862)
- 1943 – Kostis Palamas, Greek poet and playwright (born 1859)
- 1956 – Ganesh Vasudev Mavalankar, Indian lawyer and politician, 1st Speaker of the Lok Sabha (born 1888)
- 1964 – Orry-Kelly, Australian-American costume designer (born 1897)
- 1968 – Frankie Lymon, American singer-songwriter (born 1942)
- 1969 – Marius Barbeau, Canadian ethnographer and academic (born 1883)
- 1973 – Bill Everett, American author and illustrator (born 1917)
- 1977 – John Dickson Carr, American author and playwright (born 1905)
- 1980 – George Tobias, American actor (born 1901)
- 1985 – Ray Ellington, English singer and drummer (born 1916)
- 1985 – Henry Cabot Lodge Jr., American politician and diplomat, 3rd United States Ambassador to the United Nations (born 1902)
- 1985 – J. Pat O'Malley, English-American actor and singer (born 1904)
- 1986 – Jacques Plante, Canadian ice hockey player and coach (born 1929)
- 1987 – Bill Holman, American cartoonist (born 1903)
- 1987 – Franciszek Blachnicki, Polish priest (born 1921)
- 1989 – Konrad Lorenz, Austrian zoologist, ethologist, and ornithologist, Nobel Prize laureate (born 1903)
- 1992 – S. I. Hayakawa, Canadian-American linguist and politician (born 1906)
- 1993 – Lillian Gish, American actress (born 1893)
- 1998 – George H. Hitchings, American pharmacologist and academic, Nobel Prize laureate (born 1905)
- 1998 – J. T. Walsh, American actor (born 1943)
- 1999 – Horace Tapscott, American pianist and composer (born 1934)
- 2002 – Spike Milligan, Irish soldier, actor, comedian, and author (born 1918)
- 2003 – John Lanchbery, English-Australian composer and conductor (born 1923)
- 2003 – Fred Rogers, American minister and television host (born 1928)
- 2004 – Yoshihiko Amino, Japanese historian and academic (born 1928)
- 2004 – Paul Sweezy, American economist and journalist (born 1910)
- 2006 – Otis Chandler, American publisher (born 1927)
- 2006 – Robert Lee Scott, Jr., American general and author (born 1908)
- 2006 – Linda Smith, English comedian and author (born 1958)
- 2007 – Bernd Freytag von Loringhoven, German general (born 1914)
- 2008 – William F. Buckley, Jr., American author and journalist, founded the National Review (born 1925)
- 2008 – Myron Cope, American journalist and sportscaster (born 1929)
- 2008 – Ivan Rebroff, German vocalist of Russian descent with four and a half octave range (born 1931)
- 2010 – Nanaji Deshmukh, Indian educator and activist (born 1916)
- 2011 – Frank Buckles, American soldier (born 1901)
- 2011 – Necmettin Erbakan, Turkish engineer and politician, 32nd Prime Minister of Turkey (born 1926)
- 2011 – Duke Snider, American baseball player, manager, and sportscaster (born 1926)
- 2011 – Gary Winick, American director and producer (born 1961)
- 2012 – Ma Jiyuan, Chinese general (born 1921)
- 2012 – Tina Strobos, Dutch physician and psychiatrist (born 1920)
- 2012 – Helga Vlahović, Croatian journalist and producer (born 1945)
- 2013 – Van Cliburn, American pianist (born 1934)
- 2013 – Ramon Dekkers, Dutch mixed martial artist and kick-boxer (born 1969)
- 2013 – Dale Robertson, American actor (born 1923)
- 2013 – Adolfo Zaldívar, Chilean lawyer and politician (born 1943)
- 2014 – Aaron Allston, American game designer and author (born 1960)
- 2014 – Terry Rand, American basketball player (born 1934)
- 2015 – Boris Nemtsov, Russian academic and politician, First Deputy Prime Minister of Russia (born 1959)
- 2015 – Leonard Nimoy, American actor (born 1931)
- 2015 – Julio César Strassera, Argentinian lawyer and jurist (born 1933)
- 2016 – Yi Cheol-seung, South Korean lawyer and politician (born 1922)
- 2016 – James Z. Davis, American lawyer and judge (born 1943)
- 2018 – Steve Folkes, Australian rugby league player and coach (born 1959)
- 2019 – France-Albert René, Seychellois politician, 2nd President of Seychelles (born 1935)
- 2021 – Ng Man-tat, Hong Kong actor (born 1952)
- 2023 – Gérard Latortue, Haitian prime minister (born 1934)
- 2025 – Boris Spassky, Russian chess grandmaster (born 1937)

== Holidays and observances ==
- Christian feast day:
  - Anne Line
  - Gabriel of Our Lady of Sorrows
  - George Herbert (Anglicanism)
  - Gregory of Narek
  - Honorina
  - Leander
  - February 27 (Eastern Orthodox liturgics)
- Doctors' Day (Vietnam)
- Independence Day (Dominican Republic), celebrates the first independence of Dominican Republic from Haiti in 1844.
- Majuba Day (some Afrikaners in South Africa)
- Marathi Language Day (Maharashtra, India)
- World NGO Day
