= Fanny White =

New York courtesan (1823–1860)

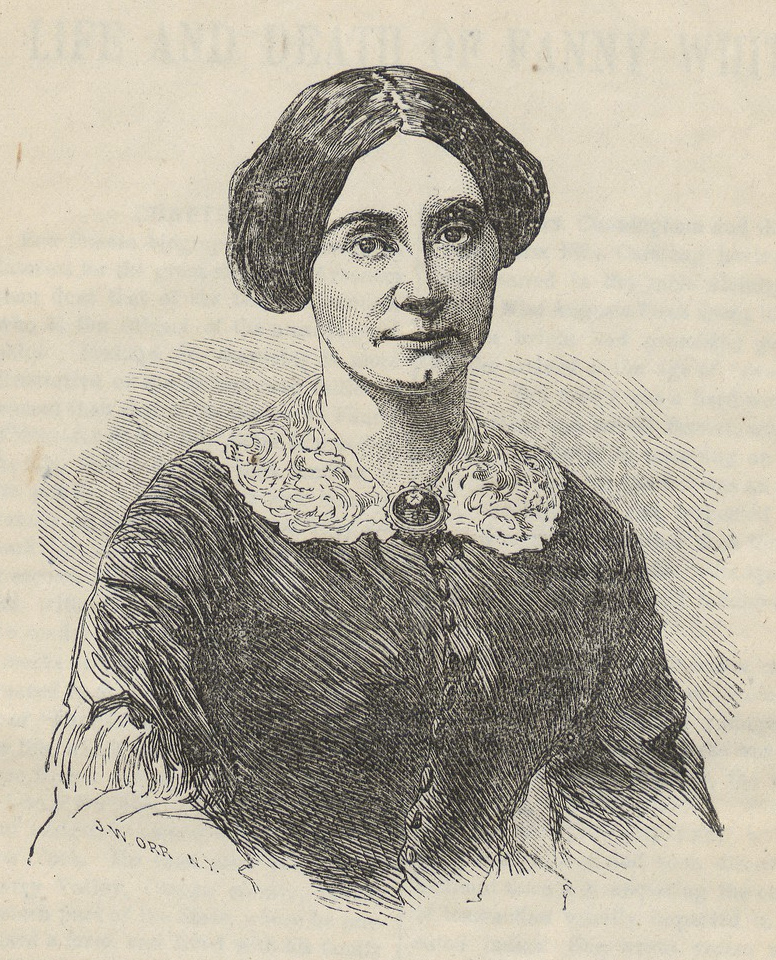
- Born: Jane Augusta Funk; March 22, 1823; Cherry Valley, New York
- Died: October 12, 1860 (aged 37); New York, New York
- Resting place: Green-Wood Cemetery
- Spouse: Edmon Blankman (m. 1859)

Jane Augusta Blankman (née Funk; March 22, 1823 – October 12, 1860), better known as Fanny White, was one of the most successful courtesans of ante-bellum New York City. Known for her beauty, wit, and business acumen, White accumulated a significant fortune over the course of her career, married a middle-class lawyer in her thirties, and died suddenly a year later. Rumors that White had been poisoned caused a public outcry, which forced an inquest into her death.

== Early life ==
Jane Augusta Funk was born on March 22, 1823, in Cherry Valley, Otsego County, New York, the eldest daughter of farmers Jacob and Jane B. Funk. Her mother died when she was just 8 years old, while her father died in 1847. Funk received a basic education and was considered a bookish girl.

At age seventeen or eighteen, Funk "became the victim of a seducer". A "seducer" was an older man who seduced naïve young women, often with a promise of marriage, only to abandon them. "Seduced and abandoned" women were considered ruined and were shunned by middle class Victorian society. Seduction reportedly was the third most common "cause" of prostitution in New York in the early 1800s, after economic motives and "inclination," and was viewed as a social problem by moral reformers.

In the fall of 1842, Funk went to New York City, to her older brother John H. Funk, a house carpenter who had moved there six years earlier. Funk's husband would later accuse John of refusing to help his ruined sister. Funk found menial work at a hotel to try to support herself. In 1843, Funk joined a "house of prostitution at 120 Church street", where she assumed her professional name of Fanny White.

== Career ==
In ante-bellum New York most brothels were owned and controlled by women. The average prostitute entered the business before age 21 and lasted four years. Most practiced the trade part-time; few continued past age 30. Many contracted tuberculosis or syphilis.

Fanny White had the business sense and good luck to beat the odds. A few months after starting work at 120 Church Street, White moved up to Julia Brown's brothel on West Broadway, near the National Theater. By 1847, the 24-year-old White was managing the brothel at 120 Church Street where she used to work.

Also by 1847, she had met lawyer and Tammany Hall brother Daniel Sickles. White's staff considered Sickles to be her "man". Nineteenth century prostitutes commonly had a "man" or a "friend" with whom they developed a romantic attachment. A prostitute's paramour did not normally pay for her attention, although Sickles did give White generous gifts of jewelry and money.

In 1851, White purchased a building at 119 Mercer Street, which she outfitted as a discreet, high-class brothel. "[H]er customers were merchants, Congressmen, and those belonging to the diplomatic corps on visits to New York." White carefully maintained good relations with the police so her establishment would escape official notice.

White's indiscreet relationship with Daniel Sickles, however, attracted considerable notice. After Sickles was elected to the New York State Assembly in 1847, he brought White to his hotel in Albany, where he introduced her around the breakfast table to the dismayed guests. He took White to visit the State Assembly Chamber, for which action he was censured by the Whigs. Another evening the two of them went out on the town with White illegally dressed as a man, and ended up spending the night in jail. Sickles almost certainly arranged the mortgage on White's Mercer Street brothel, using the name of his friend (and future father-in-law) Antonio Bagioli. Rumors that White contributed her own earnings to Sickles' election campaign would haunt Sickles for the rest of his political career.

In September 1852, Sickles hastily married sixteen-year-old Teresa Bagioli. White was rumored to be so angry that she followed him to a hotel and attacked him with a riding whip. But in August 1853, when Sickles traveled to England as the secretary to James Buchanan, the U. S. Minister to the Court of St. James, White accompanied him in lieu of his wife. One source alleges that Sickles arranged for her passport. Fellow madam Kate Hastings moved to 119 Mercer to manage White's brothel in her absence.

In England, White accompanied Sickles openly to theaters, operas, and diplomatic events. Most sources agree that White made her curtsey to Queen Victoria at a reception at Buckingham Palace, where Sickles introduced her as "Miss Bennett of New York."

Historians speculate that White talked Sickles into the introduction, and that Sickles was further motivated by his intense dislike of both the monarchy and of the editor of the New York Herald, James Gordon Bennett, Sr. Queen Victoria apparently never learned the truth, but Bennett was furious at the use of his name. The Life and Death of Fanny White, however, alleges that White legally changed her name before she left for Europe. And after 1853, White signed bank drafts and business contracts with the name "J. Augusta Bennett".

When Teresa Bagioli Sickles arrived in London in the spring of 1854, White left. One source says that White made a tour of the Continent – she "visited Paris, Baden-Baden, Vienna, and other interesting and fashionable aristocratic resorts", and was removed from the Paris Opera by gendarmes after making a drunken scene – returning to New York later in the year. Back in New York, White established a second brothel behind the St. Nicholas Hotel and also resumed management of 119 Mercer Street.

By 1856, White was seen riding around New York in the carriage of the wealthy, much older Jacob Rutgers LeRoy, one of the LeRoys of the Triangle Tract in western New York. In 1856, she also turned management of 119 Mercer Street over to Clara Gordon and moved into a house she owned at No. 108 Twelfth Street, accompanied by two "lady boarders".

== Reform of Jane Augusta Blankman ==
About 1857, White met criminal defense lawyer Edmon Blankman, seven years her junior. They married in 1859 and White became Jane Augusta Blankman. At the time of her marriage, "it was said she owned several houses in the city, which were allegedly gifts from suitors, as well as a $5,000 annuity and a real-estate lot reportedly given to her by a male friend."

Jane Blankman was generous to her family. In 1856 she paid her brother John $2,500 for a lifelong lease on a house he owned, and gave the lease to their widowed sister, Mrs. Eliza Williams. Blankman contributed half the money to purchase a Funk family lot at Green-Wood Cemetery in Brooklyn. Blankman bought her younger brother, Hiram Funk, enough shares in the Resolute Fire Insurance Company that he was able to obtain a position as surveyor for the company. She helped to raise and she paid for the schooling of her niece, Lillian Bennett. She owned the fashionable property at No. 49 West. 34th Street where she and her new husband lived as Mr. and Mrs. Blankman. She refused, however, to sign the property over to Edmon when he asked for it. When a friend asked her why not, Blankman allegedly replied that "she was not such a fool" and "that ever since her suspicions had been aroused with regard to [Edmon] trying to have intimacy with her niece, she had lost all confidence in him."

== Controversial death ==
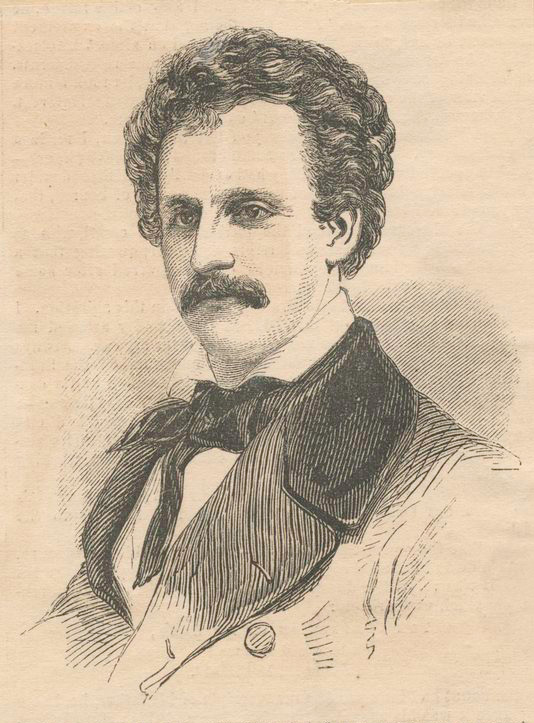
Edmon Blankman, Esq.

On October 12, 1860, Jane Blankman died suddenly at her home. She was 37 and had no known children. Rumors began immediately that her husband had poisoned her to gain access to her fortune. Her brother arranged for an autopsy to be conducted by Doctors Finnell and Sands, who concluded that Blankman had died of apoplexy (a stroke).

Her body was packed in ice and taken to Green-Wood Cemetery to be interred. But on October 16, motivated by continued rumors of poisoning, city Coroner Schirmer and District Attorney Waterbury ordered that Blankman's remains be re-examined at Bellevue Hospital. The three-day inquest became a cause célèbre and was reported in The New York Times.

The doctors who re-examined Blankman's body reported signs of exposure to tuberculosis and syphilis, as well as symptoms of cardiovascular disease and extensive bleeding in the brain, but found no sign of poisoning. The Life and Death of Fanny White describes her as "frail", but the doctor who pronounced her dead described her as "very stout".

On October 20, 1860, the Coroner affirmed the verdict of death by apoplexy. Blankman's siblings wanted to bury her in the Funk family plot, but her remains were buried on March 25, 1861, in the Blankman family plot at Green-Wood Cemetery in Brooklyn.

The "total value of her property at the time of her death was variously estimated at from $50,000 to $100,000" – or $1 to $2 million U.S. as of 2010 – but that may have been a significant underestimate of its real value. In the will presented by Edmon Blankman, she left almost her entire estate to her husband. Blankman's siblings contested the will, claiming it had been forged by her husband after her death. On June 26, 1861, after months of acrimonious testimony, Surrogate William H. Freeland ruled in favor of Edmon Blankman. Once again, her siblings appealed, but the New York Supreme Court upheld the verdict in late September. Edmon Blankman began liquidating his wife's estate in October 1861.
