= Trial of Daniel Sickles =

1859 United States murder trial

United States v. Sickles
- Court: United States District Court for the District of Columbia
- Full case name: United States of America v. Daniel E. Sickles
- Decided: April 26, 1859
- Verdict: Not guilty
- Charge: Murder of Philip Barton Key II
- Prosecution: Robert Ould
- Defense: James T. Brady, Edwin Stanton, John Graham

The trial of Daniel Sickles was an American criminal trial. It was the first time that a defense of "temporary insanity" was used in American law, and it was one of the most controversial trials of the 19th century. Daniel Sickles was a U.S. representative from the State of New York, and Philip Barton Key II was the U.S. Attorney for the District of Columbia. On 27 February 1859, Sickles, after learning that Key was having an affair with his wife, Teresa, approached Key in Lafayette Square and shot and killed him. Sickles turned himself in and was charged with murder. Sickles' defense team, which included lawyers James T. Brady and Edwin Stanton, argued that Sickles had been "temporarily insane" at the time of the murder, and therefore was not guilty. The trial was the subject of extensive media coverage, which created its own controversies and destroyed Teresa's reputation. The jury acquitted Sickles after deliberating for 70 minutes.

== Background ==
=== Affair ===
In the spring of 1858, Teresa began her affair with Key. They would meet in a vacant house on 15th Street, near Lafayette Square. The Sickles were popular in Washington society, and they often held parties and dinners in their home. Sickles and Key met at one such party and became friends. Key, a widower, also became acquainted with Teresa. He would accompany her around town. Rumors began to circulate of the affair, but Sickles remained oblivious to it.

On the evening of February 24, 1859, Daniel Sickles received an anonymous letter that described the affair in full detail. Sickles asked around about visitors of the house, and confirmed that Teresa was indeed having an affair with Key.

When Sickles confronted his wife about the affair, Teresa denied it at first, but after Sickles provided certain details of the affair, she confessed. Sickles asked Teresa to write down her confession. This confession was later leaked and published by the press, causing further controversy.

=== Murder ===
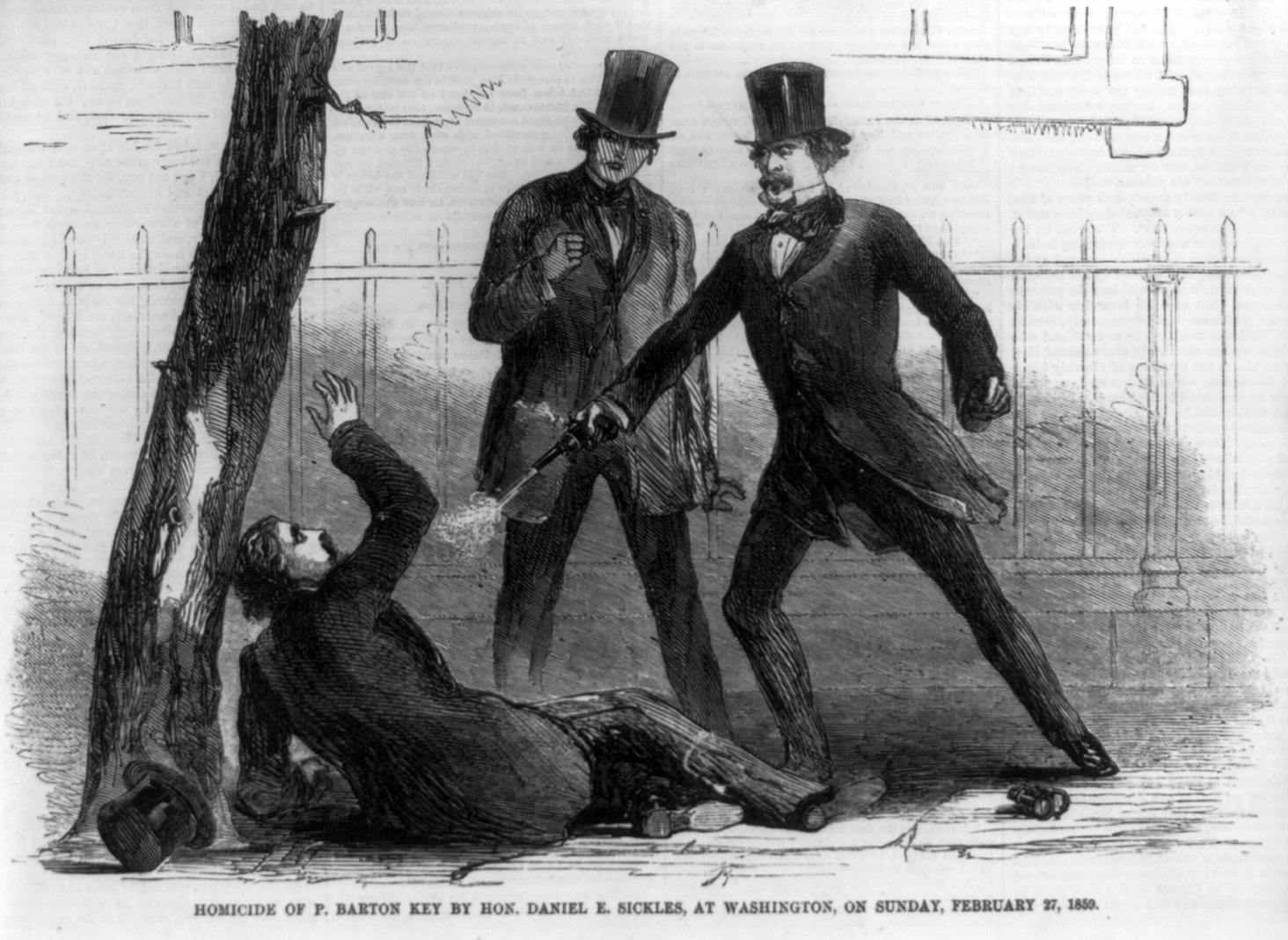
An illustration of the murder in Harper's Weekly

On 27 February 1859, Sickles approached Key while he was with Samuel F. Butterworth in Lafayette Square, where the following interaction is said to have taken place:
Sickles: "Good morning."
Key: "How are you?"
Sickles: "You scoundrel, (Note: DeRose, 2019 uses "soundrel", Thomas, 2022 uses "villain") You have dishonored my house. You must die."
Key: "What for?"

Sickles then produced a gun and fired at Key, the shot missing him. Key, now aware of what was happening, advanced on Sickles and grabbed him. Sickles wrestled free and fired again, wounding Key. Key staggered backward and shouted "Murder! Don't kill me!" Sickles moved closer to Key and fired two more shots at close range, killing him.

=== Arrest ===
Following the incident, Sickles went to the home of the Attorney General, Jeremiah S. Black. When two policemen came and asked for Sickles, Sickles went willingly.

== Trial ==
The trial commenced on 4 April 1859. The prosecutor was Robert Ould; the defense consisted of lawyers James T. Brady, Edwin Stanton, and John Graham. Sickles pleaded not guilty to the murder.

The defense argued that Sickles had become "temporarily insane" at the time of the murder. Arguing that it was a crime of passion because he was overwhelmed by jealousy and blind rage, Sickles was portrayed by the defense as the victim — he was a family man who had been disgraced and only desired justice for his family. Likewise, they portrayed Key as an adulterer who had seduced Sickles' wife. The defense appealed to the idea of an "unwritten law" that homicide was justifiable in the case of adultery. This was the first time such an argument was used in the United States. The court ruled that Teresa's confession could not be admitted as evidence.

On 26 April 1859, after deliberating for 70 minutes, the jury acquitted Sickles, to cheers in the courtroom.

== Public reaction ==
The affair, the murder, and the subsequent trial became the subject of much debate throughout the country. The trial had extensive media coverage, including publications of a leaked confession by Teresa, which sparked a separate debate amongst the public about the morality of newspapers publishing the confession. The State of California prosecuted the Daily Evening Bulletin for obscenity after it published the "disgusting" confession.

=== Sickles, or the Washington Tragedy ===
A play dramatizing the murder, Sickles, or the Washington Tragedy opened in Boston within a week of the trial's conclusion. It was well received, being described by The Boston Ledger as "a very close and correct dramatization from the facts [that] offers with it a good moral".

== Aftermath ==
After the trial, Sickles and his wife apparently reconciled, which angered the members of the public who had supported him. Teresa became an outcast and was defended only by her husband.

Sickles went on to fight in the American Civil War as a general, where he lost his leg in the Battle of Gettysburg. After the war, he held various federal and local offices. He died on May 3, 1914 and is buried in Arlington National Cemetery.

Key is buried in Oak Hill Cemetery, in Washington, D.C.
