= Antonio Bagioli =

American classical composer

Giuseppe Antonio Bagioli
- Born: November 17, 1795; Bologna, Italy
- Died: February 11, 1871 (aged 75); New York City, New York
- Occupations: music teacher, author, composer, conductor
- Spouse(s): Maria Cooke (1819–1894)
- Children: Teresa Bagioli Sickles (1836–1867)
- Parent(s): Mauro Bagioli, father Mother unknown

Giuseppe Antonio Bagioli (or just Antonio Bagioli) (1795–1871) of Bologna, Italy and New York City, New York was a successful composer, music teacher and author. He was musical director by 1832 of the Italian opera company of Giacomo Montresor, a French tenor. It was one of the first opera companies to perform in New York City, and he decided to stay and work there. He married an American woman, Maria Cooke, in New York. He composed numerous works and was highly regarded as a teacher of voice.

Their daughter Teresa married Dan Sickles, a New York politician more than twice her age. He was later elected to Congress. They were central figures in a notorious murder trial after Sickles killed Teresa's lover in 1859 on the street in Washington, DC.

The composer was sometimes confused with Antonio Bagioli (1783–1855) (son of Luigi), a cousin.

== Early years ==
Giuseppe Antonio Bagioli was born in Bologna, Italy, the son of Mauro Bagioli and of Puglioli Teresa (source:Anagrafe Napoleonica-Archivio di Stato, Cesena, Italy), on November 17, 1795. His mother's family was from Bologna and his father's family was from the nearby town of Cesena, where they had been established for generations. He studied in Bologna under Padre Mattei, and then entered the conservatory of Naples, where he studied for several years under Zingarelli. He composed melodramas that represented Cesena (1815), Naples (1824) and Bologna (1826 and others), leading to a certain fame in his native land of Italy.

== Emigration to United States ==
In 1832 Bagioli was appointed "gran maestro" (or conductor, or musical director) of the Italian opera company of Giacomo Montresor, a French tenor. This company was the first (or second) Italian opera company to visit the United States, and Bagioli traveled to New York City with the company. There, Bagioli called on Lorenzo Da Ponte, the noted music teacher. He had worked as Mozart's librettist on such works as The Marriage of Figaro and held the chair of Italian Literature at Columbia College (later Columbia University). Da Ponte's son, also named Lorenzo and sometimes called Lorenzo the Younger, was a professor at New York University. There, Bagioli met Maria (or Eliza) Cooke (1819–1894). She was the adopted daughter of Lorenzo Da Ponte and said to have been his "natural" child. (He would have been about 70 when he fathered her.) Maria was from Croton Falls, in Westchester County, New York.

After a critically successful (but perhaps not financially successful) season, the opera troupe traveled next to Havana, Cuba. Bagioli stayed in New York City, having apparently fallen in love with Maria, then still an adolescent and Da Ponte's ward. While courting Maria Cooke, Bagioli composed the score for Da Ponte's "Hymn to America" with which he would later always open and close concerts. Sources place their marriage at about 1834. Around then, Baglioli moved into the Da Ponte household and began to establish himself as a voice instructor. Their daughter, Teresa, was born in 1836, when Maria was 17.

For the rest of the 1830s, Bagioli's popularity and influence as a conductor and composer, as well as a voice instructor, was on the increase. His American students became well-known performers, and Bagioli has been credited by some with spreading the popularity of Italian song and opera throughout America. He continued to work as an orchestral conductor as well.

In 1839 the Da Ponte household accepted the young man Daniel Sickles(b 1819), to live with the family in order to study foreign languages, specifically French and Italian. His parents George Garret Sickles and Susan Marsh Sickles thought he was "sufficiently unsettled and in need of special tutoring.") The younger Sickles had become friends with Lorenzo the Younger, a New York University professor, and had ambitions of preparing for the diplomatic corps.

While boarding, Sickles made the acquaintance of Maria, the same age as he, and their daughter Teresa, who was 3 at the time. Later, as Sickles rose in prominence, rumours circulated that Sickles had seduced Maria Cooke Bagioli. When Lorenzo the Younger suddenly died about a year later, Sickles left the household but maintained ties with the Bagiolis. Possibly he continued to study French and Italian.

Sickles made Teresa Bagioli's acquaintance again in 1851, this time as an Assemblyman. (He was connected to the Tammany Hall Democratic machine). He was thirty-three years old, she was fifteen. Sickles was quite taken with Teresa and soon proposed marriage. The Bagiolis refused to consent to the marriage. Undeterred, the couple wed on September 17, 1852, in a civil ceremony, as it appears Teresa was already pregnant. Teresa's family relented and the couple married again in a Catholic ceremony, with Fr John Hughes, Catholic Archbishop of New York City, presiding. Some seven months later, in 1853, their only child, Laura Buchanan Sickles, was born.

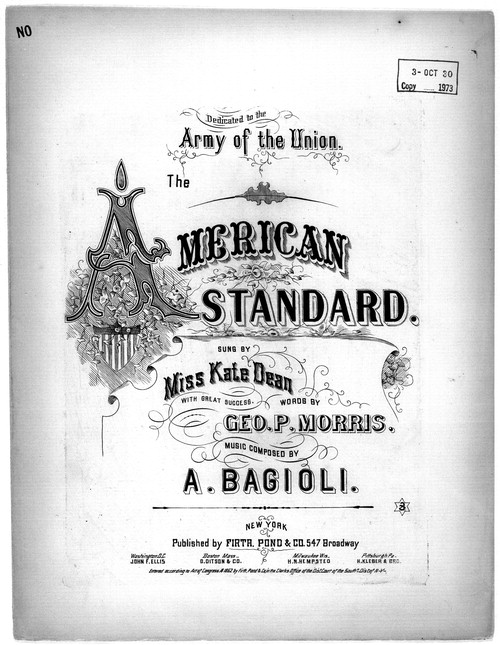
American Standard, a work composed by Bagioli, (George Morris, librettist) published in 1864

== Works ==
Bagioli produced numerous musical compositions, including a collection of studies/songs for instruction "One Hour of Daily Study for the Acquirement of a Correct Pronunciation of the Vowels, which is the only Method to become a Perfect Vocalist."

Some contemporary accounts ascribed considerable influence to Bagioli. George Templeton Strong reported that Bagioli's "local importance as a teacher of singing was equated with that of the Paris Conservatoire in Europe" by some. However, some of his students, although subjects of considerable interest, did not have further success.

== Death ==
Bagioli died in New York City on February 11, 1871. Only one of his early works has survived in complete form in his native land today, preserved at the Library Malatestiana di Cesena. This is attributed to his later career being far from Cesena. His American works, although numerous, were unknown in his home country.
