= Teresa Bagioli Sickles =

Wife of Daniel Sickles (1836–1867)

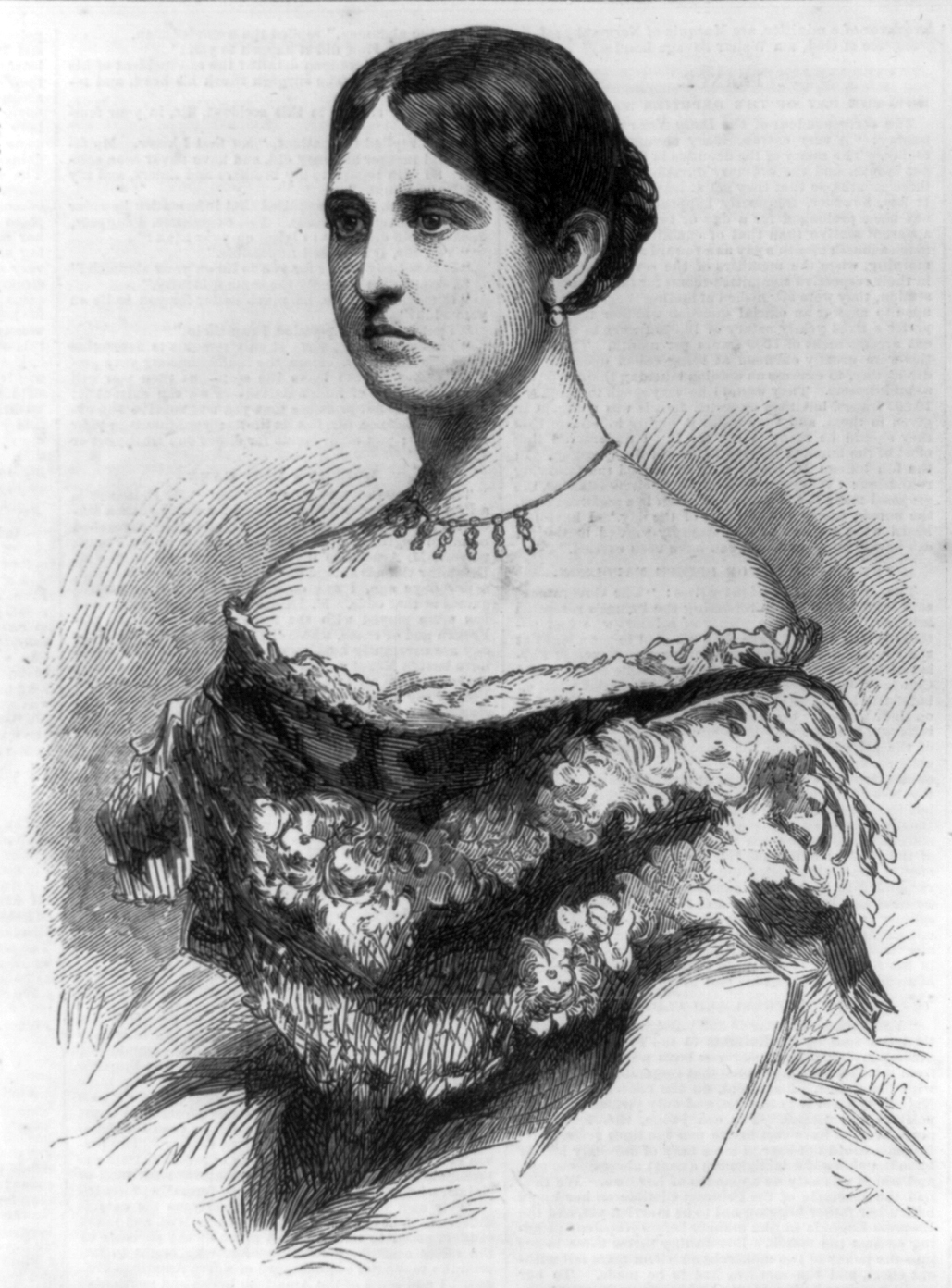
- Harper's Magazine engraving from a photo by Mathew Brady
- Born: 1836; New York City, New York
- Died: February 5, 1867 (aged 30–31); Brooklyn, New York, New York
- Occupation: housewife
- Spouse: Daniel Edgar Sickles (m. 1852)
- Children: Laura Buchanan Sickles (1853–1891)
- Parent(s): Antonio Bagioli (1795–1871); Maria Cooke (1819–1894)

Teresa Bagioli Sickles (1836 – February 5, 1867) was the wife of Democratic New York State Assemblyman, U.S. Representative, and later U.S. Army Major General Daniel E. Sickles. She gained notoriety in 1859, when her husband murdered her lover, Philip Barton Key II, son of Francis Scott Key. In the historic murder trial, Sickles successfully employed a temporary insanity defense for the first time in United States jurisprudence, and was acquitted. Teresa was publicly shamed following her infidelity. She died of tuberculosis at 31, with one daughter.

== Early years ==
Born in New York City in 1836, Teresa Da Ponte Bagioli was the daughter of the wealthy and well-known Italian singing teacher Antonio Bagioli (1795–1871) and his wife, Maria (or Eliza) Cooke (1819–1894). Maria was the adopted and alleged "natural" child of Lorenzo Da Ponte. During her youth, Teresa sometimes lived and studied in the household of her grandfather, Lorenzo Da Ponte, the noted music teacher, who had worked as Mozart's librettist on such masterpieces as The Marriage of Figaro. An exceptionally bright child, she spoke five languages by the time she was a young adult.

Dan Sickles became involved with the family when he was befriended by Da Ponte's son, a New York University professor who helped him secure a scholarship. Sickles lived in the Da Ponte home for about a year until the sudden death of his mentor. He continued to keep close ties, possibly to study French and Italian. Though Sickles had known Teresa since her infancy, he made her acquaintance again in 1851 when she was fifteen years old and he was thirty-two. At the time, he was an Assemblyman.

Sickles, a notorious womanizer, was quite taken with Teresa and soon proposed marriage. Despite his prominence and long connection to the family, the Bagiolis refused to consent to the marriage. Undeterred, the couple wed on September 17, 1852, in a civil ceremony. Teresa's family relented and the couple married again, this time with John Hughes, Catholic Archbishop of New York City, presiding. About seven months later, their only child Laura Buchanan Sickles was born in 1853.

== New York and Washington society ==
In 1853, Sickles became corporation counsel of New York City, but soon resigned to serve as secretary of the U.S. legation in London under James Buchanan, appointed by President Franklin Pierce. One source alleges he took a prostitute named Fanny White with him on his overseas assignment, while another source reports that he sent for Teresa after a few months. In any case, he returned to the United States in 1855, where he was elected to the New York Senate, serving from 1856 to 1857. Following his term, Sickles was elected to the United States House of Representatives, and served as a Democratic representative from 1857 to 1861 in the 35th and 36th US Congress.

A typical ball or fete of the period – Napier Ball

The Sickles subsequently moved to Washington, D.C. and became involved in political society. They hosted formal dinners every Thursday, and Teresa was "at home" (available to callers) to other society ladies every Tuesday morning. Teresa was called "Queen of Washington society" and attended most major events of the day, with Harper's Weekly reporting that she quickly became a fixture in Washington. Her charm and social prowess made a celebrated hostess.

Although Daniel Sickle was a Democrat, the Sickles reportedly became friends with Republican Abraham Lincoln and his wife, Mary Todd Lincoln, whose interest in spiritualism led her to host seances that Teresa attended. In 1853, early in the friendship, Mary Todd Lincoln reportedly gave a necklace to Teresa and Daniel's daughter engraved, "From Mary Lincoln to Laura Sickles".

== Affair and murder ==
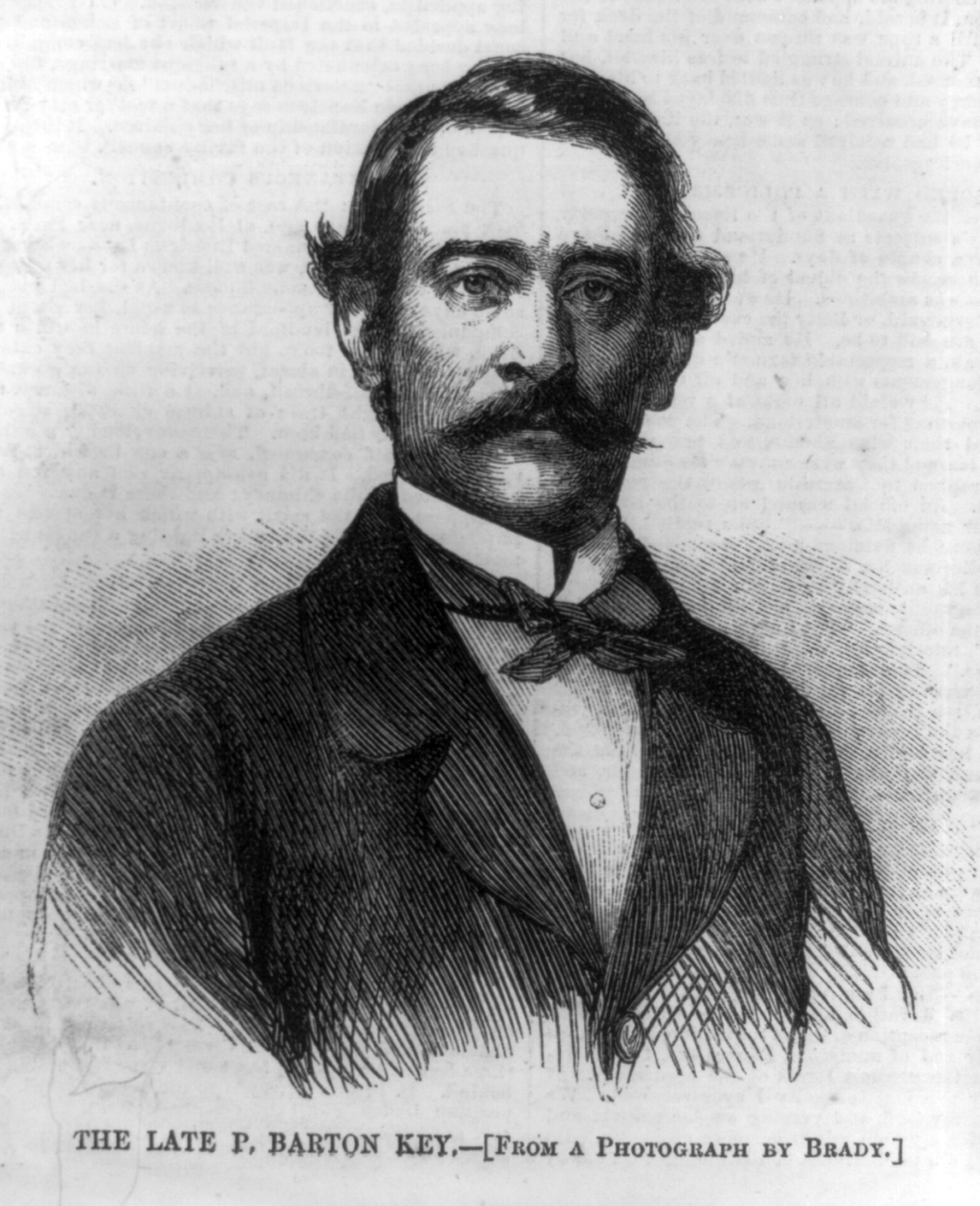
Philip Barton Key

Frank Leslie's Illustrated engraving of 15th Street assignation house

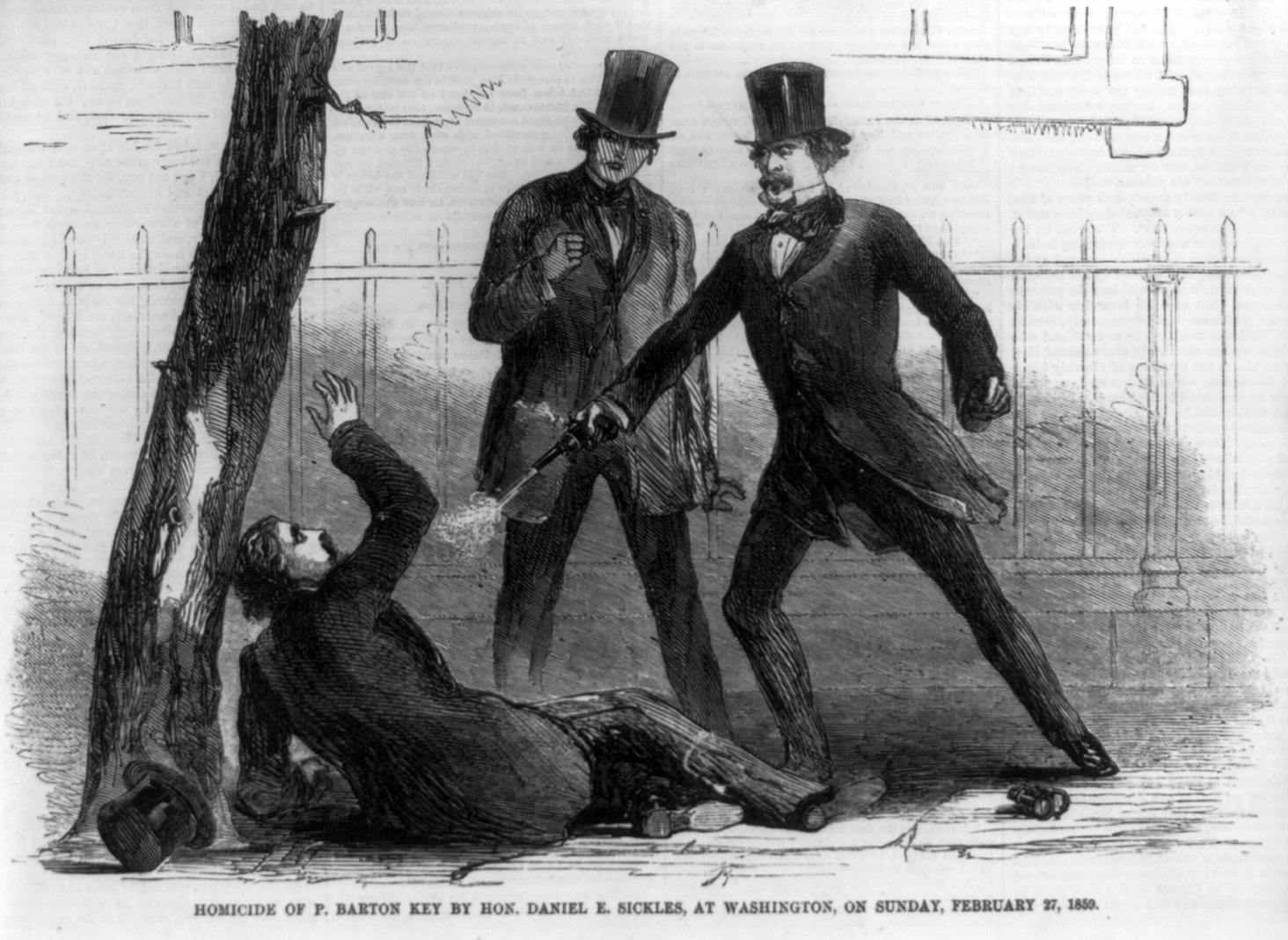
Sickles shoots Key in 1859

Daniel Sickles continued love affairs in Washington and neglected his marriage. Starting in Spring 1858, Teresa had a romance of her own with Philip Barton Key, a U.S. District Attorney and son of Francis Scott Key, the author of "The Star-Spangled Banner". Philip's uncle was Roger B. Taney, Chief Justice of the United States, and, in 1857, Philip became one of the pillars of the Washington bar. Key followed Teresa to social gatherings as well as to her home.

Months into the affair, Daniel Sickles learned about it from a poison pen letter sent to him by an anonymous source. He realized the allegations were true and that Teresa and Key rented a house within walking distance of a poor, mixed-race part of town.

Teresa's handwritten confession, as printed in Harper's Weekly

Enraged, Daniel Sickles confronted his wife, who initially denied the affair but eventually offered a detailed written confession of her numerous rendezvous with Key at a rented house on 15th Street.

On February 27, 1859, several days after Teresa's confession, Key arrived outside the Sickles home and signaled to Teresa. Daniel Sickles saw this and gathered several pistols while an acquaintance kept Key nearby. At the corner of Madison Place and Pennsylvania Avenue near the White House, Sickles fatally shot Key in broad daylight and shot an additional bullet at Key's groin. He died an hour later in a nearby house.

== After the trial and death ==
The murder trial of Daniel Sickles was highly publicized. With highly-connected attorneys such as Edwin, Sickles had the first successful use of the insanity defense in the United States, and was acquitted.

Following the public revelation of her infidelity, Teresa was reviled, lampooned in the press, and outcast from society. The Wilmington Journal wrote that while Daniel was the one on trial, "Teresa, his erring and unfortunate wife, has really been the person tied, condemned, and executed," adding that "if she really have any womanly sensibility her punishment must already have been worse than death."

Following the trial, Daniel and Teresa Sickles were temporarily estranged. When they reconciled their marriage, Daniel was met with public outrage. Teresa contracted tuberculosis and was reported in August 1860 to be slowly dying. The Civil War began the following year, and Daniel was commissioned as a Union general. After injuries in the Battle of Gettysburg, Daniel Sickles's leg was amputated and put on display.

Teresa died of tuberculosis on February 5, 1867 at the reported age of thirty-one. Her funeral took place at the Church of St Joseph in Greenwich Village, which was filled to capacity with guests including Teresa's elderly parents as well as supporters of Daniel. Daniel remarried and had two more children with a young Spanish woman whom he met as minister to Spain.

== Bibliography ==
- Teresa Sickles at History of American Women
- Brandt, Nat. The Congressman Who Got Away With Murder (Syracuse, NY: University of Syracuse Press, c. 1991), 261 pages (ISBN 0-8156-0251-0).
