= SS Maloja (1906) =

Swiss cargo ship

History
- Name: (United Kingdom) Tosto (1906-1932); (Greece) Panis (1932-1937); (United Kingdom) Highbury (1937-1938); (Greece) Nora (1938-1940); (Switzerland) Maloja (1940-1943)
- Owner: Swiss Shipping Co. Ltd.
- Port of registry: Basel, Switzerland
- Builder: Austin S. P. & Son Ltd.
- Yard number: 236
- Launched: 5 June 1906
- Completed: July 1906
- Acquired: July 1906
- Maiden voyage: July 1906
- In service: July 1906
- Out of service: 7 September 1943
- Identification: HBDI; Official No.: 2
- Fate: Sunk 7 September 1943

General characteristics
- Type: Cargo ship
- Tonnage: 1,781 GRT
- Length: 81.59 metres (267 ft 8 in)
- Beam: 11.52 metres (37 ft 10 in)
- Depth: 5.28 metres (17 ft 4 in)
- Installed power: 1 x 3-cyl. triple expansion engine
- Propulsion: Screw propeller
- Speed: 9 knots
- Crew: 23

SS Maloja was a Swiss cargo ship that was mistakenly sunk by German aircraft in the Mediterranean Sea off Cap Revellata, Corsica on 7 September 1943 while she was travelling from Lisbon, Portugal to Genoa, Italy while carrying a cargo of 1800 tons of copra oil and 220 tons of bagged copra.

== Construction ==
Maloja was built at the Austin S. P. & Son Ltd. shipyard in Sunderland, United Kingdom in June 1906, where she was launched and completed that same year. The ship was 81.59 metres (267 ft 8 in) long, had a beam of 11.52 metres (37 ft 10 in) and had a depth of 5.28 metres (17 ft 4 in). She was assessed at 1,781 GRT and had a three-cylinder triple expansion engine driving a single screw propeller. The ship could generate 1200 r.h.p. with a speed of 9 knots.

== Sinking ==
Maloja was travelling from Lisbon, Portugal to Genoa, Italy while carrying a cargo of 1800 tons of copra oil and 220 tons of bagged copra when on 7 September 1943 at 16:15, she was mistakenly attacked by 10 German aircraft with machine guns and torpedoes in the Mediterranean Sea off Cap Revellata, Corsica. The ship caught fire after a torpedo hit and sank in 7 minutes with the loss of three of her 23 crew members. The 20 survivors rowed a distance of some 65 km to Calvi Corsica in one of the remaining shot up lifeboats over night. They arrived the morning of 8 September 1943 alive, but shattered and many with injuries. From the bay in Calvi they were received by the occupying Italien forces and all taken to the military hospital in Calvi. Reports attribute the sinking to a German Luftwaffe FW-200 Condor patrol. Since the Swiss ship owners and the Swiss government did not sue for compensation, the attack was never formally recognized by Allied authorities.

== Wreck ==
The wreck of Maloja lies at (42°50′N 08°11′E).
