= Bricker Amendment =

Proposed bill to amend US Constitution

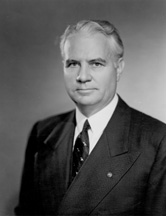
Senator John W. Bricker, the sponsor of the proposed constitutional amendment to limit the "treaty power" of the United States government

The Bricker Amendment is the collective name of a number of slightly different proposed amendments to the United States Constitution considered by the United States Senate in the 1950s. None of these amendments ever passed Congress. Each of them would require explicit congressional approval, especially for executive agreements that did not require the Senate's two-thirds approval for treaty. They are named for their sponsor, conservative Republican Senator John W. Bricker of Ohio, who distrusted the exclusive powers of the president to involve the United States beyond the wishes of Congress.

American entry into World War II led to a new sense of internationalism opposed by many conservatives. Frank E. Holman, president of the American Bar Association (ABA), called attention to federal court decisions, notably Missouri v. Holland, which he claimed could give international treaties and agreements precedence over the United States Constitution and could be used by foreigners to threaten American liberties. Bricker was influenced by the ABA's work and first introduced a proposed constitutional amendment in 1951. With substantial popular support and the election of a Republican president and Congress in the elections of 1952, together with support from many Southern Democrats, Bricker's plan seemed destined to pass Congress by the necessary two-thirds vote and be sent to the individual states for ratification by three-fourths of the state legislatures.

The best-known version of the Bricker Amendment, considered by the Senate in 1953–54, declared that no treaty could be made by the United States that conflicted with the Constitution; treaties could not be self-executing without the passage of separate enabling legislation through Congress; and treaties could not give Congress legislative powers beyond those specified in the Constitution. It also limited the president's power to enter into executive agreements with foreign powers.

Bricker's proposal attracted broad bipartisan support and was a focal point of intra-party conflict between the Eisenhower administration, which represented the more internationalist liberal Republican element, and the Old Right faction of conservative Republican senators, based in isolationist Midwestern strongholds. Despite the initial support, the Bricker Amendment was blocked through the intervention of President Dwight D. Eisenhower and Senate Minority Leader Lyndon Johnson. It failed in the Senate by a single vote in 1954, and was never voted on by the House.

Three years later the Supreme Court of the United States explicitly ruled in Reid v. Covert that the Bill of Rights cannot be abrogated by agreements with foreign powers. Nevertheless, Bricker's ideas still have supporters, and new versions of his amendment have been reintroduced in Congress periodically.

== Historical background ==
=== Fears return after World War II ===
Flag of the United Nations. Many Americans were fearful in the 1940s that the United Nations could interfere in the country's internal affairs.

The attack on Pearl Harbor temporarily silenced American non-interventionism; the America First Committee disbanded within days. However, in the final days of World War II, non-interventionism began its resurgence— non-interventionists had spoken against ratification of the United Nations Charter but were unsuccessful in preventing the United States from becoming a founding member of the United Nations. Suspicions of the UN and its associated international organizations were fanned by conservatives, most notably by Frank E. Holman, an attorney from Seattle, Washington, in what has been called a "crusade".

Holman, a Utah native and Rhodes scholar, was elected president of the American Bar Association in 1947 and dedicated his term as president to warning Americans of the dangers of "treaty law." While Article II of the United Nations Charter stated "Nothing contained in the present Charter shall authorize the United Nations to intervene in matters which are essentially within the domestic jurisdiction of any state," an international analogue to the Tenth Amendment, Holman saw the work of the UN on the proposed Genocide Convention and Universal Declaration of Human Rights and numerous proposals of the International Labour Organization, a body created under the League of Nations, as being far outside the UN's powers and an invasion against American liberties.

Holman argued that the Genocide Convention would subject Americans to the jurisdiction of foreign courts with unfamiliar procedures and without the protections afforded under the Bill of Rights. He said the Convention's language was sweeping and vague and offered a scenario where a white motorist who struck and killed a black child could be extradited to The Hague on genocide charges. Holman's critics claimed the language was no more sweeping or vague than the state and federal statutes that American courts interpreted every day. Duane Tananbaum, the leading historian of the Bricker Amendment, wrote "most of ABA's objections to the Genocide Convention had no basis whatsoever in reality" and his example of a car accident becoming an international incident was not possible. Eisenhower's Attorney General Herbert Brownell called this scenario "outlandish".

But Holman's hypothetical especially alarmed Southern Democrats who had gone to great lengths to obstruct federal action targeted at ending the Jim Crow system of racial segregation in the American South. They feared that, if ratified, the Genocide Convention could be used in conjunction with the Constitution's Necessary and Proper Clause to pass a federal civil rights law (despite the conservative view that such a law would go beyond the enumerated powers of Article I, Section 8).

President Eisenhower's aide Arthur Larson said Holman's warnings were part of "all kinds of preposterous and legally lunatic scares [that] were raised," including "that the International Court would take over our tariff and immigration controls, and then our education, post offices, military and welfare activities." In Holman's own book advancing the Bricker Amendment he wrote the UN Charter meant the federal government could:

control and regulate all education, including public and parochial schools, it could control and regulate all matters affecting civil rights, marriage, divorce, etc; it could control all our sources of production of foods and the products of the farms and factories;... it could regiment labor and conditions of employment.

== Legal background ==
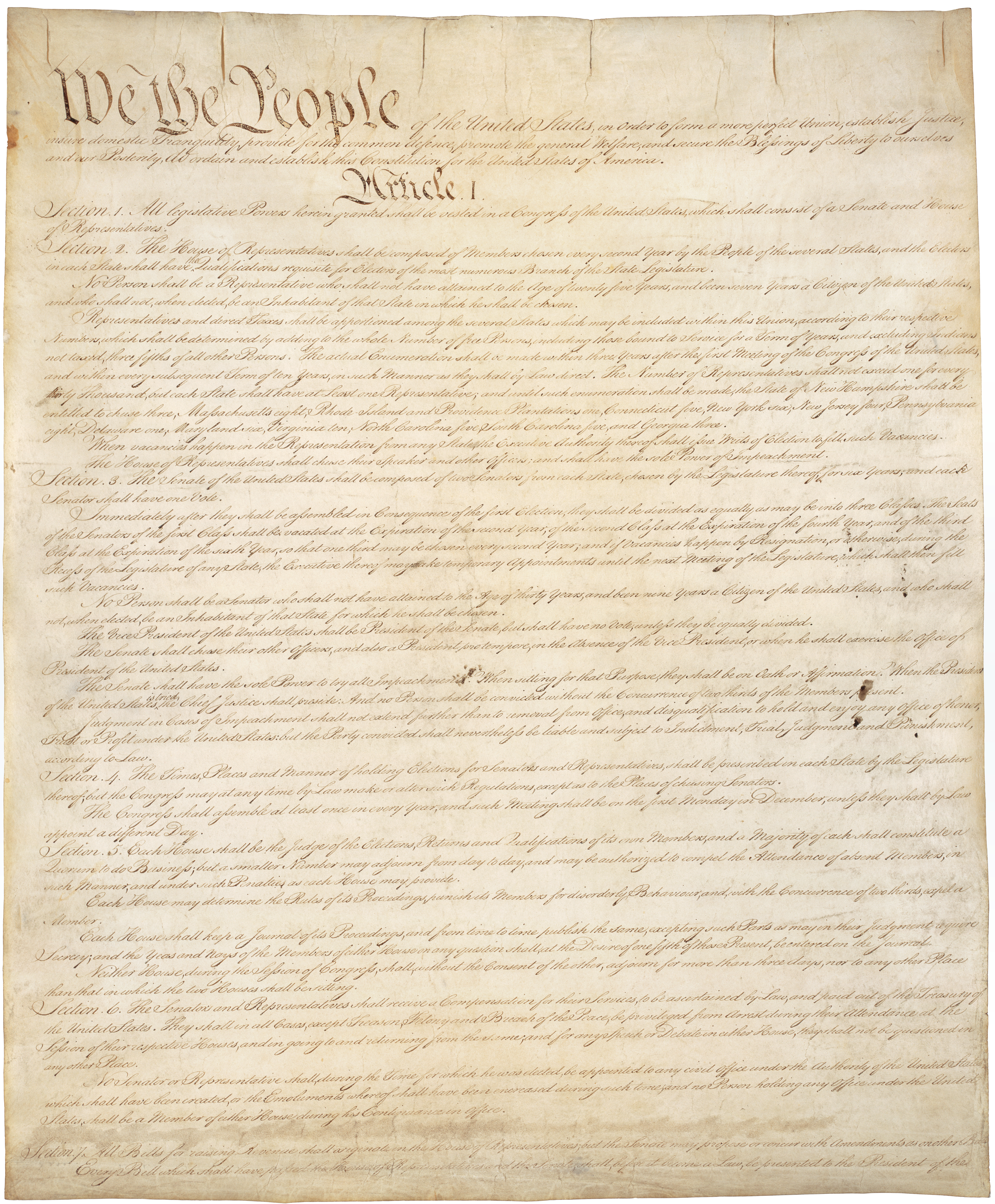
The Constitution of the United States granted the federal government control of foreign affairs.

The United States Constitution, effective in 1789, gave the federal government power over foreign affairs and restricted the individual States' authority in this realm. Article I, section ten provides, "no State shall enter into any Treaty, Alliance, or Confederation" and that "no State shall, without the Consent of the Congress . . . enter into any Agreement or Compact with another State or with a foreign Power." The federal government's primacy was made clear in the Supremacy Clause of Article VI, which declares, "This Constitution, and the laws of the United States which shall be made in Pursuance thereof; and all Treaties made, or which shall be made, under the authority of the United States, shall be the Supreme Law of the land; and the Judges in every state shall be bound thereby, any Thing in the Constitution or Laws of any State to the Contrary notwithstanding." While executive agreements were not mentioned in the Constitution, Congress authorized them for delivery of the mail as early as 1792.

=== Early precedents ===
Constitutional scholars note that the supremacy clause was designed to protect the only significant treaty into which the infant United States had entered: the Treaty of Paris of 1783, which ended the Revolutionary War and under which Great Britain recognized the thirteen former colonies as thirteen independent and fully sovereign states. Nonetheless, its wording ignited fear of the potential abuse of the treaty power from the beginning. For example, the North Carolina ratifying convention that approved the Constitution did so with a reservation asking for a constitutional amendment that

No treaties which shall be directly opposed to the existing laws of the United States in Congress assembled shall be valid until such laws shall be repealed, or made conformable to such treaty; nor shall any treaty be valid which is contradictory to the Constitution of the United States.

Early legal precedents striking down State laws that conflicted with federally negotiated international treaties arose from the peace treaty with Britain, but subsequent treaties were found to trump city ordinances, state laws on escheat of land owned by foreigners and, in the 20th Century, state laws regarding tort claims. Subsequently, in a case involving a treaty concluded with the Cherokee Indians, the Supreme Court declared "It need hardly be said that a treaty cannot change the Constitution or be held valid if it be in violation of that instrument. This results from the nature and fundamental principles of our government. The effect of treaties and acts of Congress, when in conflict, is not settled by the Constitution. But the question is not involved in any doubt as to its proper solution. A treaty may supersede a prior act of Congress, and an act of Congress may supersede a prior treaty."

Likewise, in a case regarding ownership of land by foreign nationals, the court wrote, "The treaty power, as expressed in the constitution, is in terms unlimited, except by those restraints which are found in that instrument against the action of the government, or of its departments, and those arising from the nature of the government itself, and of that of the states. It would not be contended that it extends so far as to authorize what the constitution forbids, or a change in the character of the government, or in that of one of the states, or a cession of any portion of the territory of the latter, without its consent. But, with these exceptions, it is not perceived that there is any limit to the questions which can be adjusted touching any matter which is properly the subject of negotiation with a foreign country."

Justice Horace Gray, in the Supreme Court's opinion in the 1898 citizenship case United States v. Wong Kim Ark, wrote "that statutes enacted by Congress, as well as treaties made by the President and Senate, must yield to the paramount and supreme law of the Constitution."

=== Twentieth century rulings ===
==== Missouri v. Holland ====
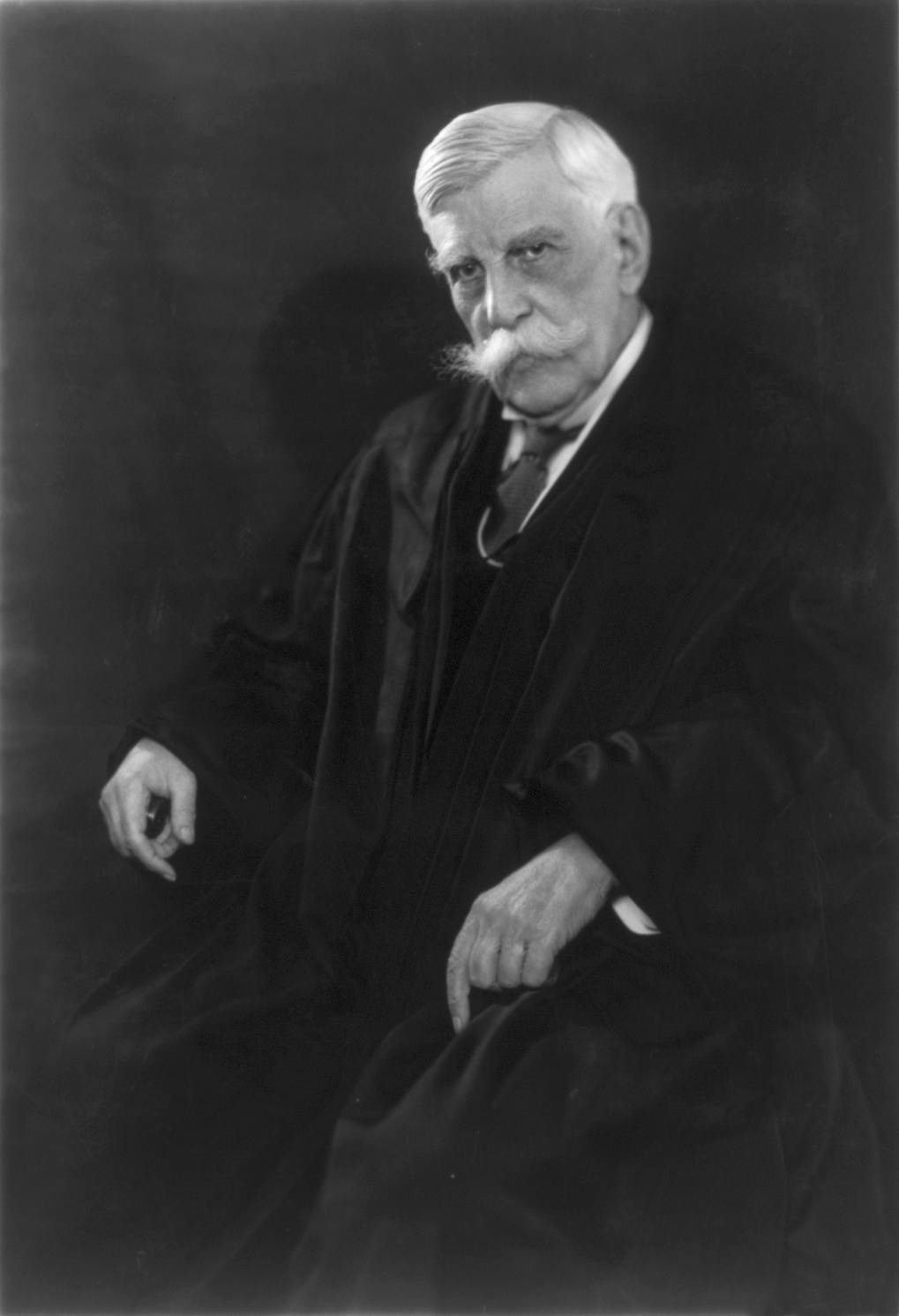
Justice Oliver Wendell Holmes' opinion in Missouri v. Holland was cited as a justification of the Bricker Amendment.

The precedent most often cited by critics of "treaty law" was Missouri v. Holland. Congress had attempted to protect migratory birds by statute, but federal and state courts declared the law unconstitutional. The United States subsequently negotiated and ratified a treaty with Canada to achieve the same purpose, Congress then passed the Migratory Bird Treaty Act of 1918 to enforce it. In Missouri v. Holland, the United States Supreme Court upheld the constitutionality of the new law. Justice Oliver Wendell Holmes, writing for the court, declared:

Acts of Congress are the supreme law of the land only when made in pursuance of the Constitution, while treaties are declared to be so when made under the authority of the United States. It is open to question whether the authority of the United States means more than the formal acts prescribed to make the convention. We do not mean to imply that there are no qualifications to the treaty-making power; but they must be ascertained in a different way. It is obvious that there may be matters of the sharpest exigency for the national well being that an act of Congress could not deal with but that a treaty followed by such an act could, and it is not lightly to be assumed that, in matters requiring national action, 'a power which must belong to and somewhere reside in every civilized government' is not to be found.

Proponents of the Bricker Amendment said this language made it essential to add to the Constitution explicit limitations on the treaty-making power. Raymond Moley wrote in 1953 that Holland meant "the protection of an international duck takes precedence over the constitutional protections of American citizens". In response, legal scholars such as Professor Edward Samuel Corwin of Princeton University said the language of the Constitution regarding treaties—"under the authority of the United States"—was misunderstood by Holmes, and was written to protect the 1783 peace treaty with Britain; this became "in part the source of Senator Bricker's agitation". Professor Zechariah Chafee of Harvard Law School wrote, "the Framers never talked about having treaties on the same level as the Constitution. What they did want was to make sure a state could no longer flout any lawful action taken by the nation". Chafee claimed that the word "Supreme", as used in Article VI, simply meant "supreme over the states".

==== Belmont and Pink ====
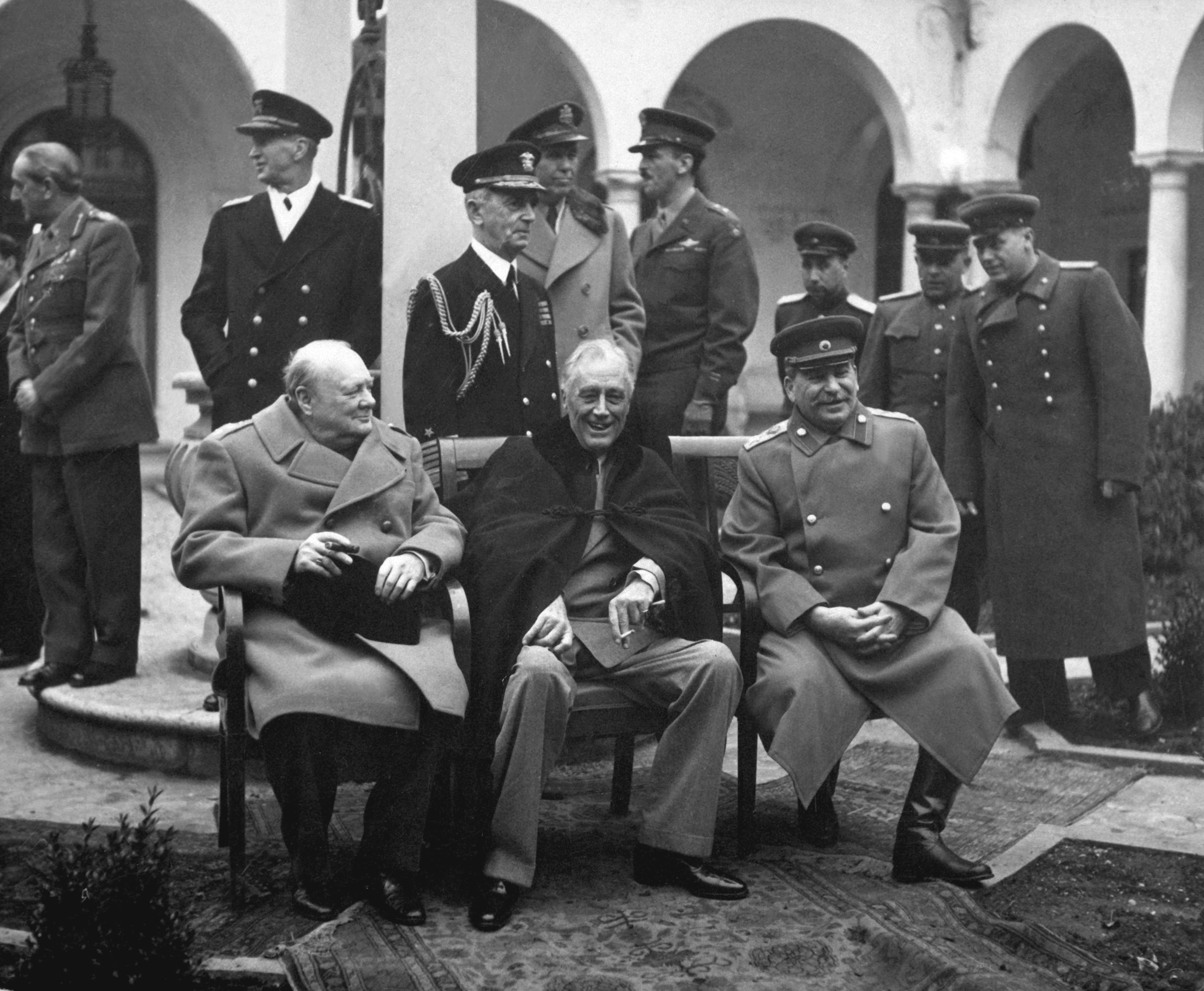
President Franklin D. Roosevelt (center) at Yalta in 1945, where he made an agreement with Winston Churchill and Joseph Stalin which was asserted to show the need for a constitutional amendment.

Two additional cases frequently cited by proponents of the Amendment were both related to the Roosevelt Administration's recognition of the Soviet government in 1933. In the course of recognizing the USSR, letters were exchanged with the Soviet Union's foreign minister, Maxim Litvinov, to settle claims between the two countries, in an agreement neither sent to the Senate nor ratified by it. In United States v. Belmont the constitutionality of executive agreements was tested in the Supreme Court. Justice George Sutherland, writing for the majority, upheld the power of the president, finding:

That the negotiations, acceptance of the assignment and agreements and understandings in respect thereof were within the competence of the President may not be doubted. Governmental power over external affairs is not distributed, but is vested exclusively in the national government. And in respect of what was done here, the Executive had authority to speak as the sole organ of that government. The assignment and the agreements in connection therewith did not, as in the case of treaties, as that term is used in the treaty making clause of the Constitution (article 2, 2), require the advice and consent of the Senate.

A second case from the Litvinov Agreement, United States v. Pink, also went to the Supreme Court. In Pink, the New York State superintendent of insurance was ordered to turn over assets belonging to a Russian insurance company pursuant to the Litvinov assignment. The United States sued New York to claim the money held by the Insurance Superintendent, and lost in lower courts. However, the Supreme Court held New York was interfering with the President's exclusive power over foreign affairs, independent of any language in the Constitution, a doctrine it enunciated in United States v. Curtiss-Wright Export Corp. and ordered New York to pay the money to the federal government. The court declared that "the Fifth Amendment does not stand in the way of giving full force and effect to the Litvinov Assignment" and

The powers of the President in the conduct of foreign relations included the power, without consent of the Senate, to determine the public policy of the United States with respect to the Russian nationalization decrees. What government is to be regarded here as representative of a foreign sovereign state is a political rather than a judicial question, and is to be determined by the political department of the government. That authority is not limited to a determination of the government to be recognized. It includes the power to determine the policy which is to govern the question of recognition. Objections to the underlying policy as well as objections to recognition are to be addressed to the political department and not to the courts.

==== Rulings during Congressional debate ====
Unlike in Pink and Belmont, an executive agreement on potato imports from Canada, litigated in United States v. Guy W. Capps, Inc., another oft cited case, the courts declared an agreement unenforceable. In Capps the courts found that the agreement, which directly contradicted a statute passed by Congress, could not be enforced.

But the dissent of Chief Justice Fred M. Vinson in Youngstown Sheet & Tube Co. v. Sawyer (commonly referred to as the "steel seizure case") alarmed conservatives. President Harry S. Truman had nationalized the American steel industry to prevent a strike he claimed would interfere with the prosecution of the Korean War. Though the United States Supreme Court found this illegal, Vinson's defense of this sweeping exercise of executive authority was used to justify the Bricker Amendment. Those warning of "treaty law" claimed that in the future, Americans could be endangered with the use of the executive powers Vinson supported.

==== State precedents ====
Some state courts issued rulings in the 1940s and 1950s that relied on the United Nations Charter, much to the alarm of Holman and others. In Fujii v. California, a California law restricting the ownership of land by aliens was ruled by a state appeals court to be a violation of the UN Charter. In Fujii, the court declared "The Charter has become 'the supreme Law of the Land... any Thing in the Constitution of Laws of any State to the Contrary notwithstanding.' The position of this country in the family of nations forbids trafficking innocuous generalities but demands that every State in the Union accept and act upon the Charter according to its plain language and its unmistakable purpose and intent."

However, the California Supreme Court overruled, declaring that while the Charter was "entitled to respectful consideration by the courts and Legislatures of every member nation," it was "not intended to supersede existing domestic legislation." Similarly, a New York trial court refused to consider the UN Charter in an effort to strike down racially restrictive covenants in housing, declaring "these treaties have nothing to do with domestic matters," citing Article 2, Section 7 of the Charter.

In another covenant case, the Michigan Supreme Court discounted efforts to use the Charter, saying "these pronouncements are merely indicative of a desirable social trend and an objective devoutly to be desired by all well-thinking peoples." These words were quoted with approval by the Iowa Supreme Court in overturning a lower court decision that relied on the Charter, noting the Charter's principles "do not have the force or effect of superseding our laws."

=== Internationalization and the United Nations ===
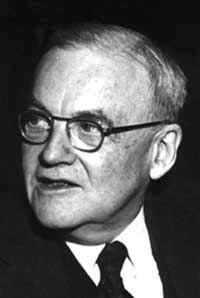
John Foster Dulles said restrictions were needed on treaties, until he became Secretary of State in the Eisenhower Administration.

Following the Second World War, various treaties were proposed under the aegis of the United Nations, in the spirit of collective security and internationalism that followed the global conflict of the preceding years. In particular, the Genocide Convention, which made a crime of "causing serious mental harm" to "a national, ethnic, racial, or religious group" and the Universal Declaration of Human Rights, which contained sweeping language about health care, employment, vacations, and other subjects outside the traditional scope of treaties, were considered problematic by non-interventionists and advocates of limited government.

Historian Stephen Ambrose described the suspicions of Americans: "Southern leaders feared that the U.N. commitment to human rights would imperil segregation; the American Medical Association feared it would bring about socialized medicine." It was, the American Bar Association declared, "one of the greatest constitutional crises the country has ever faced."

Conservatives were worried that these treaties could be used to expand the power of the federal government at the expense of the people and the states. In a speech to the American Bar Association's regional meeting at Louisville, Kentucky, on April 11, 1952, John Foster Dulles, an American delegate to the United Nations, said, "Treaties make international law and they also make domestic law. Under our Constitution, treaties become the Supreme Law of the Land. They are indeed more supreme than ordinary laws, for Congressional laws are invalid if they do not conform to the Constitution, whereas treaty laws can override the Constitution." Dulles said the power to make treaties "is an extraordinary power liable to abuse."

Senator Everett Dirksen, a Republican of Illinois, declared, "we are in a new era of international organizations. They are grinding out treaties like so many eager beavers which will have effects on the rights of American citizens." Eisenhower's Attorney General Herbert Brownell admitted executive agreements "had sometimes been abused in the past." Frank E. Holman wrote Secretary of State George Marshall in November 1948 regarding the dangers of the Human Rights Declaration, receiving the dismissive reply that the agreement was "merely declaratory in character" and had no legal effect. The conservative ABA called for a Constitutional amendment to address what they perceived to be a potential abuse of executive power. Holman described the threat:

More or less coincident with the organization of the United Nations a new form of internationalism arose which undertook to enlarge the historical concept of international law and treaties to have them include and deal with the domestic affairs and internal laws of independent nations.

Senator Bricker thought the "one world" movement advocated by those such as Wendell Willkie, Roosevelt's Republican challenger in the 1940 election, would attempt to use treaties to undermine American liberties. Conservatives cited as evidence the statement of John P. Humphrey, the first director of the United Nations Commission on Human Rights:

What the United Nations is trying to do is revolutionary in character. Human rights are largely a matter of [the] relationship between the State and individuals, and therefore a matter which has been traditionally regarded as being within the domestic jurisdiction of states. What is now being proposed is, in effect, the creation of some super national supervision of this relationship.

Frank E. Holman testified before the Senate Judiciary Committee that the Bricker Amendment was needed "to eliminate the risk that through 'treaty law' our basic American rights may be bargained away in attempts to show our good neighborliness and to indicate to the rest of the world our spirit of brotherhood." W.L. McGrath, president of the Williamson Heater Company in Cincinnati, Ohio, told the Senate that the International Labour Organization, to which he had been an American delegate, was "seeking to set itself up as a sort of international legislature to formulate socialistic laws which it hopes, by the vehicle of treaty ratification, can essentially be imposed upon most of the countries of the world."

== Congress considers the proposal ==
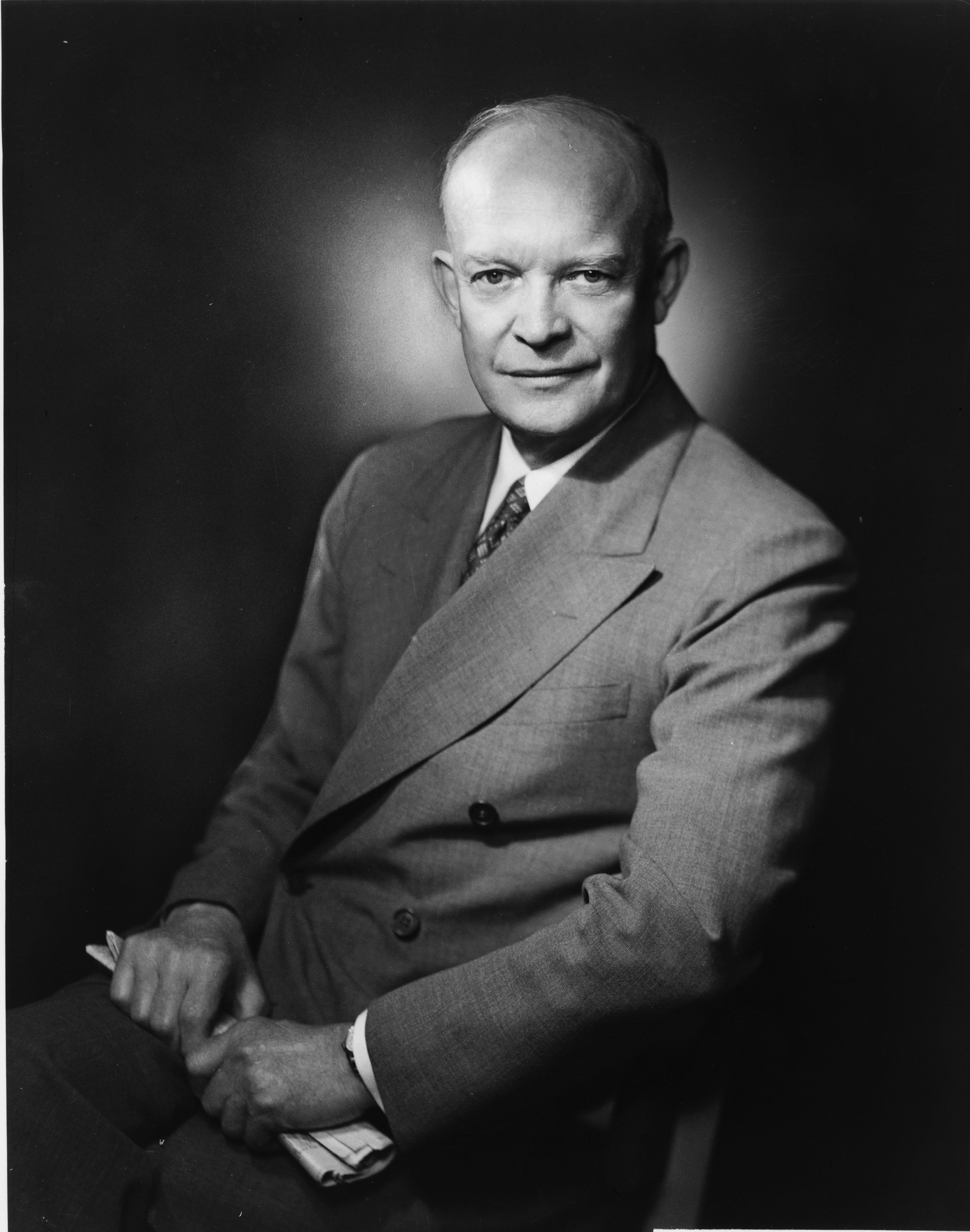
President Dwight D. Eisenhower thought the Bricker Amendment would undermine American foreign policy and worked to defeat it.

Republican Senator John W. Bricker, an attorney, had served as governor of Ohio and was Thomas E. Dewey's running mate in the 1944 campaign before winning a Senate seat in the 1946 Republican landslide. Author Robert Caro declared Senator Bricker to be "a fervent admirer" of Senators Robert A. Taft of Ohio, "whom he had three times backed for the presidential nomination," and Joseph McCarthy of Wisconsin, "whom he would support to the last," and stated that Bricker was "a fervent hater of foreign aid, the United Nations, and all those he lumped with Eleanor Roosevelt under the contemptuous designation of 'One Worlders'. He was the embodiment of the GOP's "Old Guard," borne out by his voting record: Americans for Democratic Action gave him a "zero" rating in 1949. However, Bricker was not a doctrinaire non-interventionist; he had voted in favor of the Marshall Plan and the North Atlantic Treaty.

President Eisenhower disagreed about the necessity of the Amendment, writing in his diary in April 1953, "Senator Bricker wants to amend the Constitution . . . By and large the logic of the case is all against Senator Bricker, but he has gotten almost psychopathic on the subject, and a great many lawyers have taken his side of the case. This fact does not impress me very much. Lawyers have been trained to take either side of any case and make the most intelligent and impassioned defense of their adopted viewpoint."

Historians describe the Bricker Amendment as "the high water mark of the non-interventionist surge in the 1950s" and "the embodiment of the Old Guard's rage at what it viewed as twenty years of presidential usurpation of Congress's constitutional powers" which "grew out of sentiment both anti-Democrat and anti-presidential." Bricker's pressing the issue, wrote Time just before the climactic vote, was "a time-bomb threat to both G.O.P. unity and White House-Congressional accord." Senator Bricker warned "the constitutional power of Congress to determine American foreign policy is at stake."

=== 82nd Congress ===
In the 82nd Congress, Senator Bricker introduced the first version of his amendment, S.J. Res. 102, drafted by Bricker and his staff. The American Bar Association was still studying the issue of how to prevent an abuse of "treaty law" when Bricker introduced his resolution on July 17, 1951, without the ABA's involvement, but the Senator wanted to begin immediate debate on an issue he considered vital. Bricker was not trying to reverse the Yalta Agreement, in contrast to the goals of some of his conservative colleagues; he was worried most about what might be done by the United Nations or under an executive agreement. A second proposal, S.J. Res 130, was introduced by Bricker on February 7, 1952, with fifty-eight co-sponsors, including every Republican except Eugene Millikin of Colorado.

President Harry S. Truman was adamantly opposed to limitations on executive power and ordered every executive branch agency to report on how the Bricker Amendment would affect its work and to offer this information to the Judiciary Committee. Consequently, in its hearings, the Committee heard from representatives of the Departments of Agriculture, Commerce, Defense, Labor, and the Post Office, along with the Bureau of Internal Revenue, the Securities and Exchange Commission, and the Federal Bureau of Narcotics. Duane Tananbaum wrote the hearings "provided the amendment's supporters with a wider forum for their argument that a constitutional amendment was needed" and gave opponents a chance to debate the issue.

Bricker's amendment was raised as an issue in his 1952 re-election campaign. Toledo mayor Michael DiSalle railed that the amendment was "an unwarranted interference with the provisions of the Constitution," but Bricker was easily elected to a second term.

=== 83rd Congress: Consideration by the new Republican majority ===
Bricker introduced his proposal, S.J. Res 1, on the first day of the 83rd Congress and soon had sixty-three co-sponsors on a resolution much closer to the language of the amendment proposed by the American Bar Association. This time, every Republican senator, including Millikin, was a co-sponsor, as were eighteen Democrats. Including Bricker, this totaled exactly the sixty-four votes that comprised two-thirds of the full Senate, the number necessary to approve a constitutional amendment. Companion measures were introduced in the United States House of Representatives, but no action was taken on them; the focus was on the Senate.

The Eisenhower Administration was caught by surprise as Sherman Adams, Eisenhower's Chief of Staff, thought an agreement had been reached with Bricker to delay introduction of his amendment until after the Administration had studied the issue. "Bricker hoped to force the new administration's hand," wrote Duane Tananbaum. George E. Reedy, aide to Senate minority leader Lyndon B. Johnson of Texas, said popular support for the measure made it "apparent from the start that it could not be defeated on a straight-out vote. No one could vote against the Bricker Amendment with impunity and very few could vote against it and survive at all . . . There was no hope of stopping it through direct opposition." Johnson told his aide Bobby Baker it was "the worst bill I can think of" and "it will be the bane of every president we elect."

Eisenhower privately disparaged Bricker's motives, suggesting Bricker's push for the Amendment was driven by "his one hope of achieving at least a faint immortality in American history," and considered the Amendment entirely unnecessary, telling Stephen Ambrose it was "an addition to the Constitution that said you could not violate the Constitution."

=== Eisenhower seeks delay ===
Eisenhower publicly stated his opposition in his press conference of March 26, 1953: "The Bricker Amendment, as analyzed for me by the Secretary of State, would, as I understand it, in certain ways restrict the authority that the President must have, if he is to conduct the foreign affairs of this Nation effectively. . . . I do believe that there are certain features that would work to the disadvantage of our country, particularly in making it impossible for the President to work with the flexibility that he needs in this highly complicated and difficult situation." Eisenhower's phrasing, "as analyzed for me by the Secretary of State," led Bricker and other conservatives to blame Dulles for misleading Eisenhower, and raised their suspicion that the Secretary of State was a tool of Eastern internationalist interests.

Eisenhower sent Attorney General Herbert Brownell to meet with Bricker to try to delay consideration of the resolution while the administration studied it; Bricker refused, noting his original proposal was introduced over a year earlier in the previous session of Congress. Bricker was willing, however, to compromise on the language of an amendment, unlike Frank Holman, who was intent on a particular wording. However, the administration, particularly Dulles, irritated Bricker by refusing to offer an alternative to his resolution. Eisenhower privately continued to disparage the Amendment with strong language, calling it "a stupid blind violation of the Constitution by stupid, blind non-interventionists" and stating "if it is true that when you die the name of the things that bothered you the most are engraved on your skull, I'm sure I'll have there the mud and dirt of France during the invasion and the name of Senator Bricker."

=== Republican infighting ===
Sherman Adams wrote "Eisenhower thus found himself caught in a crossfire between the Republican conservatives and the State Department" and stated President Eisenhower thought the Bricker Amendment was a refusal of the United States "to accept the leadership of world democracy that had been thrust upon it." In 1954, Eisenhower wrote Senate majority leader William F. Knowland of California stating, "Adoption of the Bricker Amendment in its present form by the Senate would be notice to our friends as well as our enemies abroad that our country intends to withdraw from its leadership in world affairs."

Despite the Amendment's popularity and large number of sponsors, Majority Leader Taft stalled the bill itself in the Judiciary Committee at the behest of President Eisenhower. However, on June 10, ill health led Taft to resign as Majority Leader, and five days later, the Judiciary Committee reported the measure to the full Senate. No action was taken before the session adjourned in August; debate would begin in January 1954.

The long delay allowed opposition to mobilize. Erwin Griswold, dean of the Harvard Law School, and Owen Roberts, retired Justice of the United States Supreme Court, organized the Committee for the Defense of the Constitution. They were joined by such prominent Americans as attorney John W. Davis, former Attorney General William D. Mitchell, former Secretary of War Kenneth C. Royall, former First Lady Eleanor Roosevelt, Governor Adlai Stevenson, former President Harry S. Truman, Judge John J. Parker, Supreme Court Justice Felix Frankfurter, Denver Post publisher Palmer Hoyt, the Reverend Harry Emerson Fosdick, socialist Norman Thomas, and General Lucius D. Clay. The Committee claimed the Amendment would give Congress too much power and make the United States' system to approve treaties "the most cumbersome in the world."

Roberts dismissed the Amendment, declaring "we must decide whether we are to stand on the silly shibboleth of national security," a statement supporters of the Amendment eagerly seized upon. The Committee was joined in opposing the Amendment by the League of Women Voters, the American Association for the United Nations, and the Association of the Bar of the City of New York, one of the few bar associations to oppose the Amendment.

Conservatives Clarence Manion, former dean of the University of Notre Dame Law School, and newspaper publisher Frank Gannett formed organizations to support the Amendment while a wide spectrum of groups entered the debate. Supporting the Bricker Amendment were the National Association of Attorneys General, the American Legion, the Veterans of Foreign Wars, the Marine Corps League, National Sojourners, the Catholic War Veterans, the Kiwanis, the U.S. Chamber of Commerce, the National Grange, the American Farm Bureau Federation, the Daughters of the American Revolution, The Colonial Dames of America, the National Association of Evangelicals, the American Medical Association, the General Federation of Women's Clubs, and the Association of American Physicians and Surgeons. In opposition were Americans for Democratic Action, the American Jewish Congress, the American Federation of Labor, B'nai B'rith, the United World Federalists, the American Civil Liberties Union, and the American Association of University Women: groups that Holman characterized as "eastern seaboard internationalists."

=== Eisenhower aided by Democrats ===
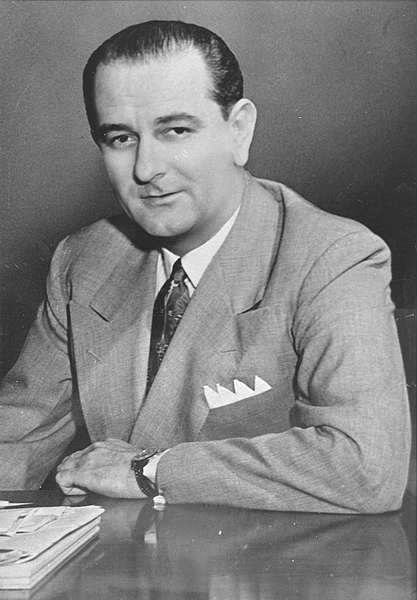
Senator Lyndon B. Johnson helped President Eisenhower defeat the Bricker Amendment.

Faced with essentially united opposition from his own Party's Senate caucus, Eisenhower needed the help of Democrats to defeat the Amendment. Caro summarized the problem: "Defeating the amendment and thereby preserving the power of the presidency—his first objective—could not be accomplished even if he united his party's liberal and moderate senators against it; there simply were not enough of them. He would have to turn conservative Senators against it too, conservatives who were at the moment wholeheartedly for it—and not just Democratic conservatives but at least a few members of the Republican Old Guard." President Eisenhower continued his opposition. In January, he claimed that the Bricker Amendment would fatally weaken the bargaining position of the United States because the states would be involved in foreign policy, recalling the divisions under the Articles of Confederation.

Before the Second Session of the 83rd Congress convened, the Amendment "went through a complex and incomprehensible series of changes as various Senators struggled to find a precise wording that would satisfy both the President and Bricker." In fact, President Eisenhower himself in January 1954 said that nobody understood the Bricker Amendment, but his position "was clear; he opposed any amendment that would reduce the President's power to conduct foreign policy." In his opposition to the Amendment, Eisenhower obtained the help of Senate Minority Leader Lyndon B. Johnson, who persuaded Senator Walter F. George of Georgia to sponsor his own proposal in order to sap support from Senator Bricker's. The George Substitute introduced on January 27, 1954, especially infuriated Bricker since George also wanted limits on treaties.

George warned in the Senate, "I do not want a president of the U.S. to conclude an executive agreement which will make it unlawful for me to kill a cat in the back alley of my lot at night and I do not want the President of the U.S. to make a treaty with India which would preclude me from butchering a cow in my own pasture." Senator George was ideal as an opponent as he was a hero to conservatives of both parties for his opposition to the New Deal and his survival of President Franklin D. Roosevelt's unsuccessful effort to purge him when he sought re-election in 1938. "Democrats and Republicans alike respected him and recognized his influence."

Eisenhower worked to prevent a vote, telling Republican Senators that he agreed that President Roosevelt had done things he would not have done, but that the Amendment would not have prevented the Yalta Agreement. By the time the Senate finally voted on the Bricker Amendment on February 26, thirteen of the nineteen Democrats who had co-sponsored it had withdrawn their support, at the urging of Senators Johnson and George. The original version of S.J. Res. 1 failed 42–50. By a 61-30 vote, the Senate agreed to substitute George's language for Bricker's— if only ninety-one senators voted, sixty-one was the necessary two-thirds vote for final approval.

Senator Herbert H. Lehman of New York said in the debate "what we are doing is one of the most dangerous and inexcusable things that any great legislative body can do." However, Johnson had planned carefully and had several votes in reserve. When revised Amendments came to a vote, with Vice President Richard Nixon presiding over the Senate, Senator Harley M. Kilgore of West Virginia arrived to cast the deciding vote of "nay." The measure was defeated 60-31. In the final count, thirty-two Republicans voted for the revised Bricker Amendment and fourteen voted against.

Senator Bricker was embittered by the defeat. "By the mid-1950s," wrote the Senator's biographer, "Bricker had become alienated from the mainstream of his own party... fulminating on the far right of the political spectrum." Decades after his defeat he was still furious. "Ike did it!" he said. "He killed my amendment."

== Aftermath ==
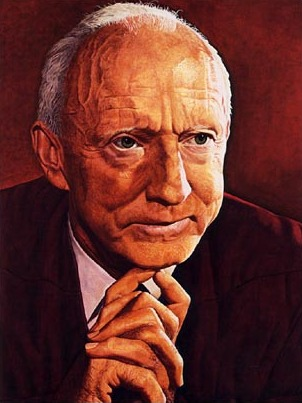
Justice Hugo Black's opinion in Reid v. Covert addressed many fears of Bricker Amendment supporters.

Eisenhower made defeating the amendment a high priority. However, to secure enough Republican votes, he had to abandon American support for the UN human rights initiative. This episode proved to be the last hurrah for the isolationist Republicans, as the younger conservatives increasingly turned to an internationalism based on aggressive anti-communism, typified by Senator Barry Goldwater.

Senator Bricker introduced another proposal later in the 83rd Congress and proposed similar constitutional amendments in the 84th and 85th Congresses. While hearings were held in the 84th and 85th Congresses, the full Senate took no action and the idea of amending the Constitution was never again seriously considered. In part, this was because the Supreme Court issued rulings that undercut arguments for it, notably in Reid v. Covert.

The Supreme Court in 1957 declared that the United States could not abrogate the rights guaranteed to citizens in the Bill of Rights through international agreements. Reid v. Covert and Kinsella v. Krueger concerned the prosecution of two servicemen's wives who killed their husbands abroad and were, under the status of forces agreements in place, tried and convicted in American courts-martial. The court found the Congress had no constitutional authority to subject servicemen's dependents to the Uniform Code of Military Justice and overturned the convictions. Justice Hugo Black's opinion for the court declared:

There is nothing in [the Constitution] which intimates that treaties and laws enacted pursuant to [it] do not have to comply with the provisions of the Constitution. Nor is there anything in the debates which accompanied the drafting and ratification of the Constitution which even suggests such a result. These debates as well as the history that surrounds the adoption of the treaty provision in Article VI make it clear that the reason treaties were not limited to those made in "pursuance" of the Constitution was so that agreements made by the United States under the Articles of Confederation, including the important peace treaties which concluded the Revolutionary War, would remain in effect. It would be manifestly contrary to the objectives of those who created the Constitution, as well as those who were responsible for the Bill of Rights—let alone alien to our entire constitutional history and tradition—to construe Article VI as permitting the United States to exercise power under an international agreement without observing constitutional prohibitions. In effect, such construction would permit amendment of that document in a manner not sanctioned by Article V. The prohibitions of the Constitution were designed to apply to all branches of the National Government and they cannot be nullified by the Executive or by the Executive and the Senate combined.

In Seery v. United States (1955) the government argued that an executive agreement allowed it to confiscate property in Austria owned by an American citizen without compensation. But this was rejected, the Court of Claims writing "we think that there can be no doubt that an executive agreement, not being a transaction which is even mentioned in the Constitution, cannot impair constitutional rights."

The United States ultimately ratified the UN's Genocide Convention in 1986. The Convention was signed with reservations, which prevented the law being enacted if it contradicted the Constitution. Several states expressed concern that this would undermine the provisions of the convention.

The Bricker Amendment is occasionally revived in Congress. For example, in 1997, Representative Helen Chenoweth (R–Idaho) offered her version of the Bricker Amendment in the 105th Congress.

== See also ==
- Presidency of Dwight D. Eisenhower § Foreign affairs
