= Alamo Scouts Training Center =

Guard Booth, Finschafen Area, New Guinea (Signal Corps Photo)

Training camp and headquarters of the U.S. Sixth Army Special Reconnaissance Unit, known as the Alamo Scouts. They served in the Southwest Pacific Theater during World War II.

Formed as a top secret ad hoc unit by the lieutenant general commanding Sixth Army, Walter Krueger, on 28 November 1943 to conduct raider and reconnaissance work in the Southwest Pacific, the Alamo Scouts performed 108 missions behind enemy lines without losing a single man killed or captured. Of the more than 700 candidates selected for training, only 138 were retained as Alamo Scouts and were formed into elite six-to-seven man teams.

In less than seventeen months in the field the Alamo Scouts earned 118 combat decorations and numerous other awards. The unit was unceremoniously disbanded in late November 1945 with a war record unmatched in United States military history. In 1988 the Alamo Scouts were awarded the Special Forces Tab recognizing the unit as a forerunner of the modern Special Forces.

First Director of Training was Frederick W. Bradshaw, followed by Homer A. Williams, then by Gibson Niles.

There were nine training classes that lasted for six weeks each. Their locations were; two at Kalo Kalo, Fergusson Island, New Guinea. one at Mange Point, Finschafen Area, New Guinea, two at Cape Kassoe, Hollandia, Dutch New Guinea, one at the mouth of Cadacan River, on the Philippine island of Leyte, and three at Mabayo (Subic Bay) on the Philippine island of Luzon.

== Notes ==
=== Sources ===
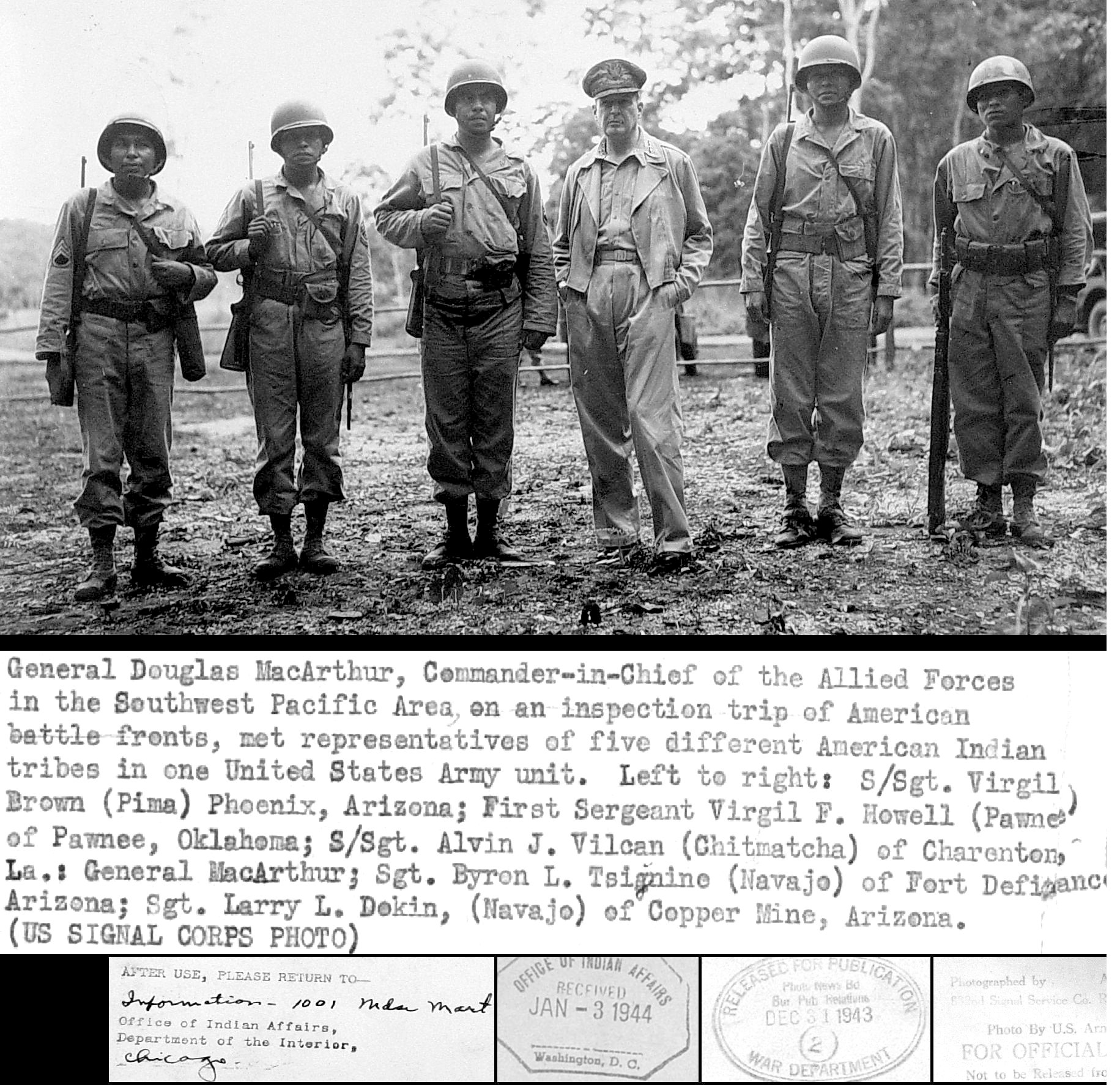
General Douglas MacArthur meeting Native American troops, including graduates of the Alamo Scouts Training Center.

- Silent Warriors of World War II, The Alamo Scouts Behind Japanese Lines by Lance Q. Zedric. Pathfinder Publishing 1995.
- Silent No More, The Alamo Scouts In Their Own Words by Lance Zedric and Russ Blaise. War Room Press 2013.
- Johnson, Forrest Bryant. Hour of Redemption: The Heroic WW II Saga of America's Most Daring POW Rescue. Warner Books, 2002. Originally published in 1978.
- Russ Blaise, Executive Director/Board Chairman of the Alamo Scouts Historical Foundation.
