= United States ex rel. Toth v. Quarles =

Toth v. Quarles
- Supreme Court of the United States

Argued February 8, 1955 Reargued October 13, 1955 Decided November 7, 1955
- Full case name: United States ex rel. Toth v. Quarles, Secretary of the Air Force
- Citations: 350 U.S. 11 (more) 76 S. Ct. 1; 100 L. Ed. 2d 8
- Reargument: Reargument
- Opinion announcement: Opinion announcement

Case history
- Prior: Toth v. Talbott, 114 F. Supp. 468 (D.D.C. 1953); reversed sub. nom. Talbott v. United States ex rel. Toth, 215 F.2d 22 (D.C. Cir. 1954); cert. granted, 348 U.S. 809 (1954).

Court membership
- Chief Justice Earl Warren Associate Justices Hugo Black · Stanley F. Reed; Felix Frankfurter · William O. Douglas; Harold H. Burton · Tom C. Clark; Sherman Minton · John M. Harlan II

Case opinions
- Majority: Black, joined by Warren, Frankfurter, Douglas, Clark, Harlan
- Dissent: Reed, joined by Burton, Minton
- Dissent: Minton, joined by Burton, Reed

United States ex rel. Toth v. Quarles, 350 U.S. 11 (1955), was a decision by the Supreme Court of the United States that expanded the rights of citizens to civilian trials, holding that an ex-serviceman cannot be court-martialed for crimes alleged during his military service.

== Background ==
The United States Air Force alleged that the petitioner, Robert W. Toth, committed a murder while he was on active duty in Korea.

On September 27, 1952, while on guard duty at an air base in South Korea, Robert W. Toth and Thomas Kinder took a South Korean civilian, Bang Soon Kil, into custody. Bang, who was intoxicated, grabbed at Toth's arm, in response to which Toth beat him. Lt. George Schreiber, the guards' commanding officer, then told them to shoot him.

By the time Toth's connection to the murder was discovered, he had already completed his service in the Air Force and received an honorable discharge. (Schreiber and Kinder, who were still serving, were court-martialed and convicted.)

Donald A. Quarles, at the time the Secretary of the Air Force, argued that as the crimes occurred during Toth's military service, the military could constitutionally try him.

== Legal details ==
The case mostly dealt with the Uniform Code of Military Justice (UCMJ), a 1950 law passed by the 81st United States Congress and signed by President Harry S. Truman, and whether or not certain provisions of it were constitutional; that is to say, whether or not Congress could deprive ex-service members of their Fourth and Fifth Amendment rights.

In the majority opinion, decided 6–3, Justice Hugo Black wrote that "[the UCMJ] is not a valid exercise of the power granted Congress in Article I of the Constitution." The decision in Quarles would prove as an important precedent which the Court would rely on two years later in the landmark Reid v. Covert ruling. Whereas Quarles dealt with the case of an ex-servicemember, Covert would deny the government the ability to try any US citizen by military tribunal, even citizens abroad. This important precedent was re-affirmed in Hamdi v. Rumsfeld (2004), where the Court ruled that while the US government may detain enemy combatants abroad, those detained must have "the ability to challenge their enemy combatant status before an impartial authority" for the detention to be constitutional. On 18 January 1960, the Supreme Court handed down three more verdicts to clarify and extend Kinsella v. Krueger. In Kinsella v. United States, the Court extended the ruling to dependents for non-capital offenses; Grisham v. Hagen extended it to civilian employees of the military for capital offenses; and McElroy v. United States extended it to civilian employees for all offenses. The gap in the law regarding civilians employed by or accompanying the military overseas remained until the passage of the Military Extraterritorial Jurisdiction Act, which President Bill Clinton signed into law on 2November 22, 2000. MEJA was a bill passed in 2000 that allowed persons who are "employed by or accompanying the armed forces" overseas may be prosecuted under the Military Extraterritorial Jurisdiction Act of 2000 for any offense that would be punishable by imprisonment for more than one year if committed within the special maritime and territorial jurisdiction of the United States. "Employed by the armed forces" is defined to include civilian employees of the Department of Defense (DoD) as well as its contractors and their employees (including subcontractors at any tier), and, after October 8, 2004, civilian contractors and employees from other federal agencies and "any provisional authority," to the extent that their employment is related to the support of the Department of Defense mission overseas.

Those who dissented gave various reasons. While Justice Sherman Minton agreed that civilians "not under the jurisdiction of the Military Code" have a right to a civilian trial, he argued that the Court had erred because Toth was not a "full-fledged civilian". Justice Stanley F. Reed, on the other hand, argued that the solution to the question should have come from Congress amending the UCMJ and not via a Court order.

Toth was never re-tried by civilian authorities. A 1989 article in the Military Law Review described him as having "literally got away with murder;" however, Toth died on December 20, 1960, at age 29.

== See also ==
- Kinsella v. Krueger
