= Frank E. Holman =

American lawyer

Frank Holman
- Born: Frank Ezekiel Holman; 1886; Sandy, Utah, U.S.
- Died: 1967 (aged 80–81); Seattle, Washington, U.S.
- Education: University of Utah (BA); University of Oxford (LLB)
- Known for: Work on the Bricker Amendment

Frank Ezekiel Holman (1886–1967) was an American attorney known for his 1948 effort to amend the United States Constitution to limit the power of treaties and executive agreements. Holman's work led to the Bricker Amendment.

== Early life and education ==
Holman was born in Sandy, Utah. He graduated from the University of Utah in 1908 and won a Rhodes Scholarship to study law at the University of Oxford.

== Career ==
Admitted to the Washington bar in 1911 and the Utah bar in 1912, he was the dean of the S.J. Quinney College of Law from 1913 to 1915, after which he began a law practice in Salt Lake City.

In 1924, he moved to Seattle, Washington, to practice law until his retirement in 1961. Holman argued cases in state and federal courts, including the United States Supreme Court.

Holman was active in legal organizations. He was president of the Seattle Bar Association in 1941 and the Washington State Bar Association in 1945. He was elected president of the American Bar Association in 1948 and traveled extensively to warn Americans of the dangers of "treaty law".

In 1953, the Seattle-King County Association of Realtors awarded him their "First Citizen" award.

Holman's papers are in the collection of the University of Washington Library in Seattle.

== Death ==
Holman died in Seattle in 1967.

== Bibliography ==
- Frank E. Holman. The Life and Career of a Western Lawyer, 1886-1961. Baltimore, Maryland: Port City Press, 1963.
- Frank E. Holman. The Story of the "Bricker Amendment." New York City: Fund for Constitutional Government, 1954.
