= Alamo Scouts =

Alamo Scouts, 6th Army Special Reconnaissance Unit
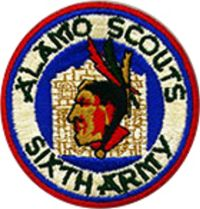
- Active: 28 November 1943 – November 1945
- Country: United States
- Branch: United States Army
- Type: Special reconnaissance unit
- Size: 138
- Engagements: World War II: New Guinea Campaign; Philippines Campaign (1944–1945)

The Alamo Scouts (U.S. 6th Army Special Reconnaissance Unit) was a reconnaissance unit of the Sixth United States Army in the Pacific Theater of Operations during World War II. The unit is best known for its role in liberating American prisoners of war (POWs) from the Japanese Cabanatuan POW camp near Cabanatuan, Nueva Ecija, Philippines in January 1945.

== Origins ==
The Scouts were organized on Fergusson Island, New Guinea, on 28 November 1943. Their purpose was to conduct reconnaissance and raider work in the Southwest Pacific Theater. The scouts often operated deep behind Japanese lines. They were under the personal command of Lieutenant General Walter Krueger, Commanding General of the U.S. Sixth Army. General Krueger wanted a unit that could provide timely vital intelligence on the enemy's troop numbers, unit types, and locations to the Sixth Army. General Krueger had previously received faulty intelligence reports from other sources outside of Sixth Army.

Krueger sought to create an all volunteer elite unit consisting of small teams which could operate deep behind enemy lines. Their primary mission was to gather intelligence for the Sixth Army. The Alamo Scouts were so-named because Alamo Force was the name given to Krueger's command (and Sixth Army in particular) by General Douglas MacArthur, Supreme Allied Commander of the SouthWest Pacific. (MacArthur deliberately created Alamo Force to give himself direct control of US Army units, as a parallel structure to the official Allied Ground Forces command, under Australian General Sir Thomas Blamey.) In addition, Krueger had personal links to San Antonio, Texas, location of the Alamo Mission and a personal interest in the Battle of the Alamo.

The Alamo Scouts were an ad hoc unit and had no table of organization & equipment (TO&E).

== Accomplishments ==
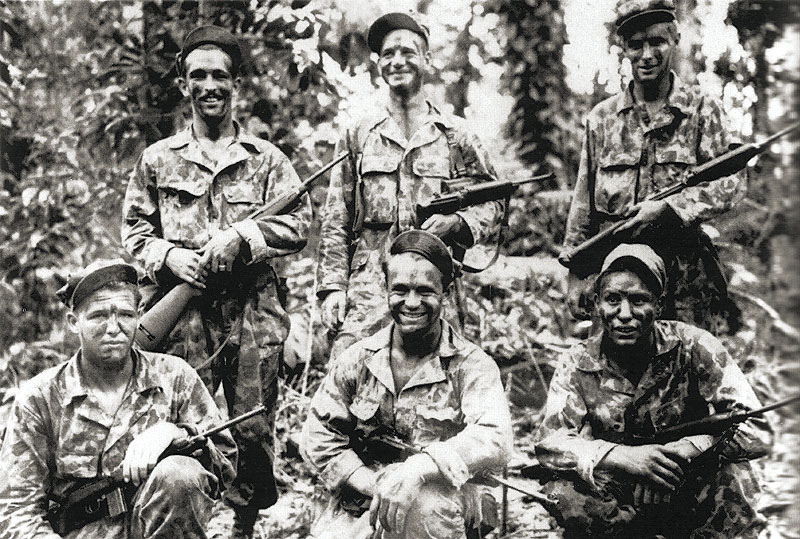
A team of Alamo Scouts, February 1944.

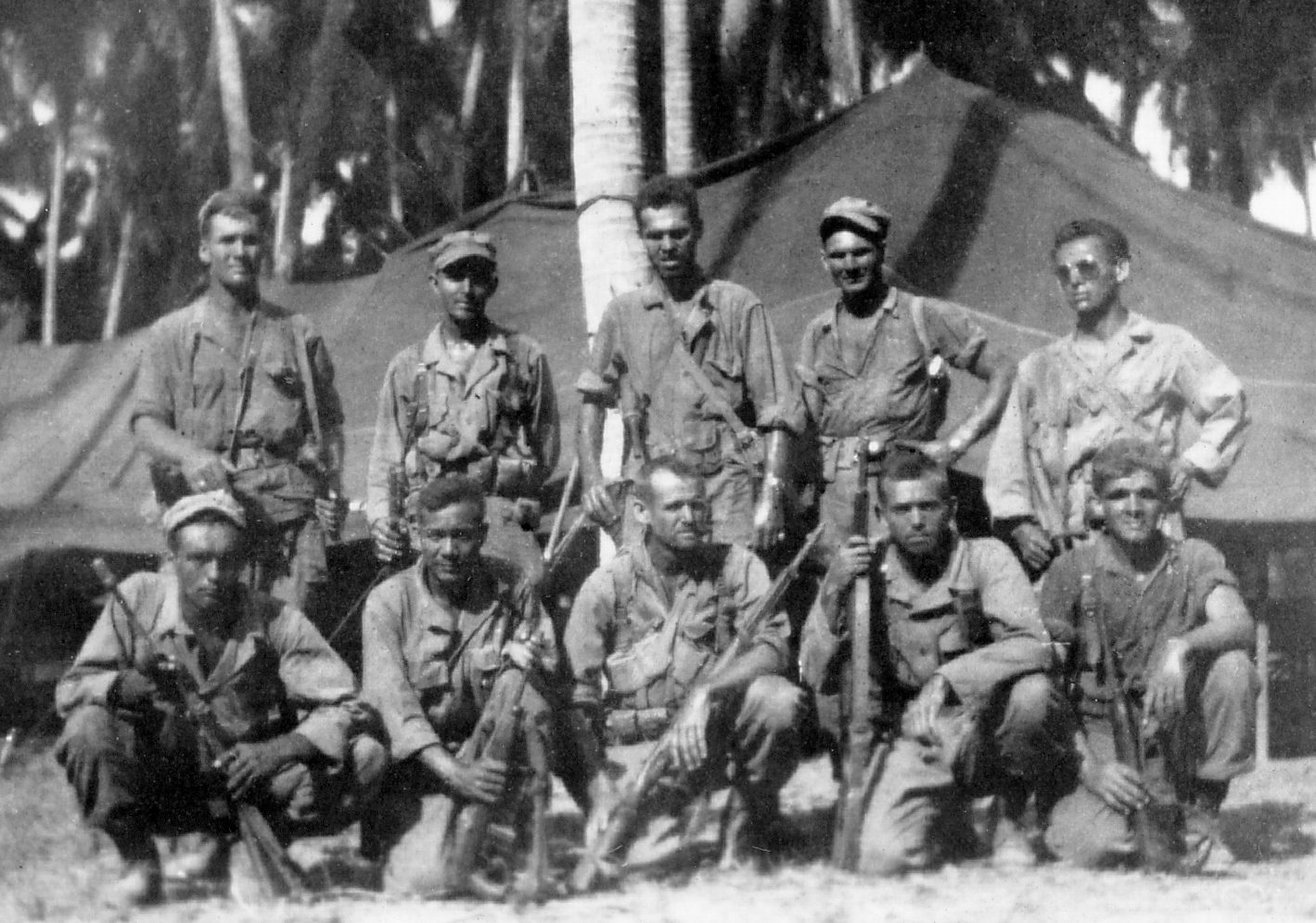
A team of Alamo Scouts, February 1945.

In the Scouts' two years of operation they were credited with liberating 197 Allied prisoners in New Guinea.

During the New Guinea Campaign, Alamo Scout missions normally lasted from one to three days and were mostly reconnaissance and intelligence gathering in nature, but as the Allies advanced into the Philippines the unit's mission expanded dramatically, with some missions lasting two months or longer. Furthermore, the unit assumed a central role in organizing large-scale guerrilla operations, establishing road watch stations, attempting to locate and capture or kill Japanese flag officers, and performing direct action missions, such as the Cabanatuan POW Camp liberation. In January 1945 the scouts were teamed with elements of the 6th Ranger Battalion and Filipino guerrilla units to liberate 513 POWs in a daring night attack. The scouts provided reconnaissance and tactical support for the 6th Ranger Battalion during the raid of the Cabanatuan Prison Camp. The Scouts performed advance reconnaissance of the POW camp prior to the 6th Rangers' Raid on the camp. Prior to the raid, two of the scouts dressed themselves as local Filipino rice farm workers. These two scouts then set up a covert observation post inside a shack in the rice fields that surrounded the POW camp. This hidden observation post was located within a few hundred yards of Japanese Army guard posts at the camp's fence line. The scouts were never discovered by the Japanese during this reconnaissance. The Scouts were credited with the capture of 84 Japanese prisoners of war, and only two Scouts were wounded in the mission.

While not on missions, Alamo Scout teams were assigned as bodyguards for General Krueger and had specific instructions to kill the general if capture was imminent.

Near the end of the war Alamo Scout teams were preparing for the invasion of Japan, where they were slated to conduct pre-invasion reconnaissance of Kyushu as part of Operation Downfall, but the war ended.

The Alamo Scouts performed 110 known missions behind enemy lines, mainly in New Guinea and the Philippines, without losing a single man.

The unit was disbanded at Kyoto, Japan, in November 1945.

== Legacy ==
In 1988, the soldiers of the Alamo Scouts were awarded the Special Forces Tab in recognition for their services in World War II, including them in the lineage of the current United States Army Special Forces.

The Raid at Cabanatuan, carried out by a combined team of Alamo Scouts, Rangers and Filipino guerrillas, has been depicted in feature films. Edward Dmytryk's 1945 film Back to Bataan opens by retelling the story of the raid on the Cabanatuan POW camp, including real life film of the POW survivors. The 2005 John Dahl film The Great Raid, based on the books The Great Raid on Cabanatuan and Ghost Soldiers, focused on the raid.

In 1950, the Philippine Army named their special forces unit the Scout Ranger Regiment in honor of the Alamo Scouts and the US Army Rangers.

== Boy Scouts of America ==
Former Alamo Scout Sergeant Major Kittleson founded the Alamo Scouts, a local Exploring Scouting (Now Venturing) unit, in his hometown area Toeterville, Iowa in 1981, after retiring in 1978 from the military. The organization offers a military style training environment for local youth. It was disbanded in 2021

Troop 253 in East Grand Rapids, Michigan has an Alamo Scouts patrol, named in honor of the original unit. Its patrol motto is "Remember!" and the patrol patch was adapted from the World War II unit logo.

== See also ==
- Former United States special operations units
