= Kinsella v. Krueger =

- Supreme Court of the United States

Argued 3 May, 1956 Reargued 27 February, 1957 Decided 10 June, 1957
- Full case name: Kinsella v. Krueger
- Citations: 351 U.S. 470 (more) 77 S. Ct. 1222; 1 L. Ed. 2d 1148; 1957 U.S. LEXIS 729

Case history
- Prior: U.S. ex rel. Krueger v. Kinsella, 137 F. Supp. 806 (S.D.W. Va. 1956); cert. granted, 350 U.S. 986 (1956).
- Subsequent: On rehearing, Reid v. Covert, 354 U.S. 1 (1957).

Holding
- The Constitution supersedes all treaties ratified by the United States Senate. The military may not try the civilian wife of a soldier under military jurisdiction.

Court membership
- Chief Justice Earl Warren Associate Justices Hugo Black · Felix Frankfurter; William O. Douglas · Harold H. Burton; Tom C. Clark · John M. Harlan II; William J. Brennan Jr. · Charles E. Whittaker

Case opinions
- Plurality: Black, joined by Warren, Douglas, Brennan
- Concurrence: Frankfurter
- Concurrence: Harlan
- Dissent: Clark, joined by Burton
- Whittaker took no part in the consideration or decision of the case.

Laws applied
- U.S. Const. Art. III; U.S. Const. amend. V U.S. Const. amend. VI

Kinsella v. Krueger, 351 U.S. 470 (1956), was a landmark United States Supreme Court case in which the Court ruled that the Constitution supersedes international treaties ratified by the United States Senate. According to the decision, the Court recognized the supremacy of the Constitution over a treaty, although the case itself was with regard to an executive agreement, not a "treaty" in the U.S. legal sense, and the agreement itself has never been ruled unconstitutional.

== Background ==
Colonel Aubrey Dewitt Smith was the chief of the Logistics Section of the Plans and Operations Division at the headquarters, United States Army, Japan. A graduate of the United States Military Academy at West Point, ranked 123rd in the class of 1930, he had served with distinction with the 77th Infantry Division in the Battle of Okinawa, earning two Silver Stars, the Bronze Star Medal, the Legion of Merit and the Commendation Ribbon. He later served on the headquarters of the X Corps in the Korean War. He married Dorothy Krueger, the daughter of General Walter Krueger, who had commanded the Sixth United States Army during World War II. They had two children.

On 3 October 1952, Dorothy Smith stabbed her husband with a 10-inch (250 mm) long hunting knife while he slept in their Army quarters in Japan. After trying unsuccessfully to staunch the flow of blood, Colonel Smith summoned their live-in Japanese maid, Shigeko Tani, who found Dorothy Smith in her underwear and holding a knife. She took the knife from Dorothy Smith and, at Colonel Smith's request, summoned Lieutenant Colonel Joseph S. Hardin, a neighbor and fellow West Point-educated regular Army officer. Hardin found Dorothy attempting to light a pair of cigarettes. She told him: "I'm sorry I didn't get him in the heart."

Colonel Smith was taken to Tokyo Army Hospital, but died there from loss of blood at 6 am the following morning. Dorothy Smith was held in the isolation ward of the 8167th Station Hospital for observation. Major General William E. Shambora, the Surgeon General of the Far East Command, ordered a psychiatric evaluation. In December 1952, an Army Medical Board declared her fit to stand trial.

== Procedural history ==
A military court martial was convened in Tokyo under the Uniform Code of Military Justice. A nine-member court was convened in January 1953, headed by Major General Joseph P. Sullivan. Its members, all military officers, included a Women's Army Corps lieutenant colonel. Dorothy Smith's defense lawyer, Lieutenant Colonel Howard S. Levie, initially argued that the court had no legal jurisdiction over the wife of an Army officer. When this was rejected by the court, he argued that she was not guilty due to temporary insanity. At the time of the incident, Dorothy Smith had been taking barbiturates and paraldehyde.

The court martial was told that Dorothy Smith had undergone two months' treatment for mental illness in 1951, and had attempted suicide while on the ship to Japan the year before. Her personal physician, Brigadier General Rawley E. Chambers, told the court that Dorothy Smith was subject to "neurotic explosions", that she had slashed her wrists a number of times, and that she once had assaulted another Army wife. "I believe she would be able to tell right from wrong", the general said. "But I do not believe that she had any ability to adhere to the right." By six votes to three, the court martial found Dorothy Smith guilty of first-degree murder and sentenced her "to be confined at hard labor for the rest of her natural life". A unanimous verdict of guilty would have meant a mandatory death sentence. The case was reviewed by Brigadier General Onslow S. Rolfe, the commanding officer of the Headquarters and Service Command of the Far East Command, and the Judge Advocate General. That he was junior in rank to Sullivan meant that his ability to overrule the former was constrained. Meanwhile, Dorothy Smith was flown back to the United States in a Military Air Transport Service plane, which reached Travis Air Force Base near San Francisco on 25 February 1953. She was held at the Presidio of San Francisco, and then imprisoned at the Federal Prison Camp, Alderson, in West Virginia.

Walter Krueger's lawyers filed an appeal with the United States Court of Military Appeals. Brigadier General Adam Richmond, who had been judge advocate of the Third United States Army when it had been commanded by Krueger in the early 1940s, argued that Dorothy was not sane at the time of the incident, and that the testimony that the court-martial had heard to the contrary was military rather than medical. On 30 December 1954, by a two-to-one majority, they rejected the appeal filed by Krueger's lawyers. "Since this court lacks the power to determine the weight of the evidence, even as to the issue of sanity, we are without authority to disturb the board's determination – regardless of whether we might have reached an opposite conclusion". The opinion was written by Judge Paul W. Brosman; Judge George W. Latimer concurred. Chief Judge Robert E. Quinn dissented on the grounds that the prosecution's expert witnesses testified in accordance with Army regulations rather than their knowledge and medical experience, feeling bound by the restrictive terms of the joint Air Force (AFM 160-42) and Army (TM 8–240) manual, Psychiatry in Military Law. He felt that as a consequence, "their testimony was so seriously compromised as to require, in the interests of justice a rehearing."

Krueger's attorneys filed a writ of habeas corpus with Ben Moore, Chief Judge of the U.S. District Court for the Southern District of West Virginia, in Charleston, West Virginia, on 9 December 1955, based on a decision by District Court Judge Edward A. Tamm of the United States District Court for the District of Columbia. Tamm had released Mrs. Clarice B. Covert, the wife of an Air Force Sergeant Edward Eugene Covert who had killed her sleeping husband with an ax in England on 9 March 1953, from Alderson on a $1,000 bond. This in turn was based on a recent ruling by the United States Supreme Court on 7 November 1955 in the case of Robert W. Toth, a former Air Force sergeant. Toth was tried by a court martial after he had been honorably discharged from the Air Force, for a murder in Korea committed five months before his discharge. The Supreme Court had ruled the military had no jurisdiction to try someone once they had been discharged from military service. Krueger hired Covert's lawyer, Frederick Bernays Wiener to represent Dorothy. But Moore declined to follow Tamm, and denied relief. As a result, Covert was on release while Dorothy remained incarcerated in Alderson. Krueger appealed to the Fourth Circuit Court of Appeals. The case became Kinsella v. Krueger, Nina Kinsella being the prison warden at Alderson. While the appeal was pending the government sought certiorari from the United States Supreme Court before the 4th Circuit heard the appeal. In view of the importance of the constitutional issue presented by the case, the writ was granted without action by the Circuit Court.

== Supreme Court decision ==
Article One of the United States Constitution, §8, enumerates the powers of the United States Congress. These include "making rules for the government and regulation of the said land and naval forces, and directing their operations". From 1775 to 1949, the United States military exercised control over civilians under the Articles of War, under which they were subject to military courts martial. In 1916, Congress specifically extended the scope of the articles of war to cover all civilians accompanying military forces outside the United States. After World War II, the Articles of War were superseded by the Uniform Code of Military Justice (UCMJ), which came into effect on 31 May 1951. It specified that civilians were subject to the UCMJ:

(10) In time of war, persons serving with or accompanying an armed force in the field;
(11) Subject to any treaty or agreement to which the United States is or may be a party or to any accepted rule of international law, persons serving with employed by or accompanying the armed forces outside the United States ...

These were the provisions under which Dorothy Smith was tried. The United States had struck executive agreements with Great Britain and Japan allowing American citizens to be tried under the UCMJ rather than local law. Notably, the UCMJ did not require trial by a jury, as required by Article Three of the United States Constitution, §2, and the Sixth Amendment to the United States Constitution.

The Supreme Court handed down its verdict on 11 June 1956. Writing for the majority, Justice Tom C. Clark wrote:

Furthermore, since under the principles of international law each nation has jurisdiction of the offenses committed within its own territory ... the essential choice involved here is between an American and a foreign trial. Foreign nations have relinquished jurisdiction to American military authorities only pursuant to carefully drawn agreements which presuppose prompt trial by existent authority. Absent the effective exercise of jurisdiction thus obtained, there is no reason to suppose that the nations involved would not exercise their sovereign right to try and punish for offenses committed within their borders. Under these circumstances, Congress may well have determined that trial before an American court-martial in which the fundamentals of due process are assured was preferable to leaving American servicemen and their dependents throughout the world subject to widely varying standards of justice unfamiliar to our people ... No question of the legal relation between treaties and the Constitution is presented.

The Supreme Court ruled that:

Article 2(11) of the Uniform Code of Military Justice is constitutional.

- (a) A civilian dependent of an American serviceman authorized to accompany him on foreign duty may constitutionally be tried by an American military court-martial in a foreign country for an offense committed there.
- (b) The Constitution does not require trial in a foreign country before a court conforming to Article III for offenses committed there by an American citizen, and Congress may establish legislative courts for that purpose.
- (c) In the circumstances of this case, it was reasonable and consonant with due process for Congress to employ the existing system of courts-martial for this purpose.
- (d) There is no constitutional defect in the fact that the Uniform Code of Military Justice does not provide for indictment by grand jury or trial by a petit jury, since, in these respects, it does not differ from the procedures specifically approved by this Court in other types of legislative courts established abroad by Congress.

On this, the court relied for precedent on the Insular Cases. The decision was five-three, with Justices Hugo Black and William O. Douglas and Chief Justice Earl Warren dissenting. Justice Charles E. Whittaker did not participate. Justice Felix Frankfurter filed a reservation, which impelled Wiener to file a petition for a rehearing despite the fact that, as he later acknowledged, "most requests for rehearing enjoy the viability of snowballs beyond the River Styx".

== Rehearing ==
On 8 October 1956, the first order day of its 1956 term, the Supreme Court asked J. Lee Rankin, the United States Solicitor General, for a response to Wiener's petition, which was granted on 5 November 1956. Justice John M. Harlan II had changed his mind, and Justice Sherman Minton had retired. Since he had not participated in the earlier decisions, his replacement, William J. Brennan Jr., was not involved in this decision, although he would sit on the rehearing.

On rehearing, the Supreme Court consolidated the case with Reid v. Covert. On 10 June 1957, it reversed its previous decision. It was a stunning development; it was the first time since it had first sat in 1790 that it had reversed a decision without a major intervening change in its membership, for even without Brennan, the verdict would have been the same. Writing for the plurality, Justice Hugo Black wrote:

These cases raise basic constitutional issues of the utmost concern. They call into question the role of the military under our system of government. They involve the power of Congress to expose civilians to trial by military tribunals, under military regulations and procedures, for offenses against the United States thereby depriving them of trial in civilian courts, under civilian laws and procedures and with all the safeguards of the Bill of Rights. These cases are particularly significant because for the first time since the adoption of the Constitution wives of soldiers have been denied trial by jury in a court of law and forced to trial before courts-martial ... Now, after further argument and consideration, we conclude that the previous decisions cannot be permitted to stand. We hold that Mrs. Smith and Mrs. Covert could not constitutionally be tried by military authorities.

Black was joined in the plurality opinion by Warren, Douglas and Brennan. Frankfurter and Harlan wrote separate concurring opinions. Only Justices Clark and Harold H. Burton dissented. The Supreme Court ruled that:

1. When the United States acts against its citizens abroad, it can do so only in accordance with all the limitations imposed by the Constitution, including Art. III, § 2, and the Fifth and Sixth Amendments.
2. Insofar as Art. 2(11) of the Uniform Code of Military Justice provides for the military trial of civilian dependents accompanying the armed forces in foreign countries, it cannot be sustained as legislation which is "necessary and proper" to carry out obligations of the United States under international agreements made with those countries, since no agreement with a foreign nation can confer on Congress or any other branch of the Government power which is free from the restraints of the Constitution.
3. The power of Congress under Art. I, § 8, cl. 14, of the Constitution, "To make rules for the government and regulation of the land and naval Forces," taken in conjunction with the Necessary and Proper Clause, does not extend to civilians – even though they may be dependents living with servicemen on a military base.
4. Under our Constitution, courts of law alone are given power to try civilians for their offenses against the United States.

== Outcome ==
As a result of the ruling, Dorothy Smith was released from prison and went to live with her father in San Antonio. She enrolled in secretarial course at a business college there. She still struggled with mental illness, and had a nervous breakdown in August 1958 that resulted in her being hospitalized in John Sealy Hospital in Galveston, Texas. After her release, Dorothy became a medical secretary. She died in 1996.

On 18 January 1960, the Supreme Court handed down three more verdicts to clarify and extend Kinsella v. Krueger. In Kinsella v. United States, the Court extended the ruling to dependents for non-capital offenses; Grisham v. Hagen extended it to civilian employees of the military for capital offenses; and McElroy v. United States extended it to civilian employees for all offenses.

The gap in the law regarding civilians employed by or accompanying the military overseas remained until the passage of the Military Extraterritorial Jurisdiction Act, which President Bill Clinton signed into law on 22 November 2000.

== See also ==
- Botiller v. Dominguez (1889)
- Reid v. Covert (1957)
- Wilson v. Girard (1957)
- United States ex rel. Toth v. Quarles (1955)
