= Reid v. Covert =

- Supreme Court of the United States

Argued May 3, 1956 Reargued February 27, 1957 Decided June 10, 1957
- Full case name: Reid, Superintendent, District of Columbia Jail v. Clarice Covert
- Citations: 354 U.S. 1 (more) 77 S. Ct. 1222; 1 L. Ed. 2d 1148; 1957 U.S. LEXIS 729

Holding
- The military may not deprive American civilians of their Bill of Rights protections by trying them in a military tribunal.

Court membership
- Chief Justice Earl Warren Associate Justices Hugo Black · Felix Frankfurter; William O. Douglas · Harold H. Burton; Tom C. Clark · John M. Harlan II; William J. Brennan Jr. · Charles E. Whittaker

Case opinions
- Plurality: Black, joined by Warren, Douglas, Brennan
- Concurrence: Frankfurter
- Concurrence: Harlan
- Dissent: Clark, joined by Burton
- Whittaker took no part in the consideration or decision of the case.

Laws applied
- U.S. Const. Art. VI

Reid v. Covert, 354 U.S. 1 (1957), is a 6–2 landmark decision of the United States Supreme Court holding that United States citizen civilians outside of the territorial jurisdiction of the United States cannot be tried by a United States military tribunal, but instead retain the protections guaranteed by the United States Constitution, in this case, trial by jury. Additionally, a plurality of the Court also reaffirmed the president’s ability to enter into international executive agreements, though it held that such agreements cannot contradict federal law or the Constitution.

== Background ==
The case involved Clarice B. Covert, who was convicted by a military tribunal for the 1953 murder of her husband, a sergeant in the USAF, at an airbase in England. At the time of her alleged offense, an executive agreement was in effect between the United States and United Kingdom, which permitted US military courts to exercise exclusive jurisdiction over offenses by U.S. servicemen or their dependents. She was sentenced to life in prison. Her lawyers appealed the verdict. In 1956, a 5-4 decision resulted in the Supreme Court ruling against Mrs. Covert.

The following year, Covert's lawyer, Frederick Bernays Wiener, famously made a successful petition for rehearing. In that interim, two justices from the initial unfavorable ruling retired; one of the replacements (Charles E. Whittaker) was not yet seated at the time of the hearing and so took no part in the decision, leaving the petition to be heard by eight judges instead of the usual nine. The petition was successful: the court changed its mind and issued a new decision in Covert's favor. This is the only time the Supreme Court, without a relevant change in its membership, has changed its mind as the result of a petition for rehearing.

== Opinion of the Court ==
The Court found: "No agreement with a foreign nation can confer power on the Congress, or on any other branch of Government, which is free from the restraints of the Constitution." The Court's core holding of the case is that U.S. citizen civilians abroad have the right to Fifth Amendment and Sixth Amendment constitutional protections.

The Court found it unconstitutional to adjudge U.S. citizen civilians in military courts, under the Uniform Code of Military Justice.

The Court agreed with the petitioners, concluding that as United States citizens they were entitled to the protections of the Bill of Rights, notwithstanding that they committed crimes on foreign soil. The Court distinguished Reid from the Insular Cases: The "Insular Cases" can be distinguished from the present cases in that they involved the power of Congress to provide rules and regulations to govern temporarily territories with wholly dissimilar traditions and institutions.

Justice Black declared: "The concept that the Bill of Rights and other constitutional protections against arbitrary government are inoperative when they become inconvenient or when expediency dictates otherwise is a very dangerous doctrine and if allowed to flourish would destroy the benefit of a written Constitution and undermine the basis of our government."

Justice Harlan concurred with the judgment of the Court but disagreed with much of Justice Black's reasoning. He held that the court-martial per se was not unconstitutional, being an appropriate application of the Necessary and Proper Clause. Harlan also explicitly stated that this power was not limited by either Article III or the Fifth and Sixth amendments.

=== Dissent ===
Justices Clark and Burton dissented by claiming the majority released two likely killers from prosecution; they also claimed that both long-held and recent precedent was disregarded with little logic.

== Significance ==
The significance of the case lies in the protection that the United States Constitution grants to civilians who are associated with the United States Armed Forces and are accused of crimes. Covert and its progeny cases made clear that civilians cannot be tried by military courts, but instead must be tried in civil courts regardless where the crime was committed. "The Constitution does not allow Congress to pass regulations that allow the military to court-martial a civilian. To do so would deprive an individual of all the safeguards of the Constitution and Bill of Rights, as well as the protections of civil laws and protections. [...] Covert and its progeny unequivocally strike down military jurisdiction over civilian crimes of the United States. [...] From this point on, the Constitution was to be interpreted as ensuring that the Bill of Rights would protect all U.S. citizens accused of crimes no matter where those crimes occurred."

== Aftermath ==
Clarice Covert could not be retried. She eventually moved to Flagstaff, Arizona, where she worked in the advertising department of Arizona Sun newspaper and as an archaeologist at the Museum of Northern Arizona. She died on May 9, 1992, in Flagstaff, Arizona.

== See also ==
- Botiller v. Dominguez (1889) (land grants by Mexico before annexation are invalid unless confirmed by the board of land commissioners)
- Wilson v. Girard (1957) (agreement to cede extraterritorial jurisdiction in a criminal case to the host country was constitutional)
- Kinsella v. Krueger (1957) (the Constitution supersedes international agreements; US civilian citizens cannot be tried in military courts)
- United States ex rel. Toth v. Quarles (1955) (discharged servicemen are civilians and cannot be tried in military courts)
- List of United States Supreme Court cases, volume 354
