= Corps area =

Former US Army military districts

A corps area was a geographically-based organizational structure (military district) of the United States Army used to accomplish administrative, training, and tactical tasks from 1920 to 1942. Each corps area included divisions of the Regular Army, Organized Reserve, and National Guard of the United States. Developed as a result of serious mobilization problems during World War I, this organization provided a framework to rapidly expand the Army in times of war or national emergency, such as the Great Depression.

The nine corps areas, created by the War Plans Division under authority of United States War Department General Order No. 50 on 20 August 1920, had identical responsibilities for providing peacetime administrative and logistical support to the army's mobile units as was provided by the six territorial "Departments" they replaced. In addition, the corps areas took on the responsibilities for post and installation support units ("Zone of the Interior" units) created during World War I. Corps areas had the added responsibility for planning and implementing mobilization plans for all Regular Army, National Guard, and Organized Reserve mobile units in their respective geographic areas; the development and administration of hundreds of new Organized Reserve and Reserve Officers Training Corps (ROTC) units; and managing the personnel records for thousands of Reserve officers, enlisted personnel, ROTC cadets, and Citizens Military Training Camp (CMTC) candidates.

To create the corps areas, the United States was divided geographically by state lines, making nine multi-state areas that were all roughly equal in population. Each corps area was responsible for organizing two tactical corps, consisting of three infantry divisions each. Each corps area also had responsibility for organizing various other field army, General Headquarters Reserve, Zone of the Interior (later designated as Corps Area Service Command), and Communications Zone units. The First, Second, Third, Fourth, Eighth, and Ninth Corps Areas also organized units to man various fixed coastal defenses. The corps areas were further grouped into three army areas of two field armies each.

== Early army administrative units ==
For the century preceding 1920 the U.S. Army was geographically divided into series of Military Divisions, "Departments" and smaller "Districts" and Subdistricts. Departments and divisions were numbered or named for their geographic location. Before the War of 1812 these administrative units were geographically named starting with the Department of the East and Department of the West. About 1815, the areas were numbered until after the Civil War. After the Civil War, the system used until after World War I was again geographically identified; i.e. Department of the East or Department of the Missouri and subordinate units were called divisions or districts. The last reorganization of departments was done in 1917 after the beginning of World War I.

== National Defense Act of 1920 and establishment of corps area-level organizations ==
Authorized by the National Defense Act of 1920, which amended the National Defense Act of 1916, nine multi-state sized "corps areas" were established on 20 August 1920 by the U.S. Army Chief of Staff through War Department General Order Number 50. The corps areas were formed for administration, training, and tactical control of the army, replacing the six geographical (or territorial) military departments into which the continental United States had been divided since 1917 and with little variation since the Civil War. Three overseas commands: the Hawaiian Department, Panama Canal Department, and the Philippine Department continued to be identified as departments.

The 1920 act was a realization that the mobilization of a citizen army could no longer meet the defense needs of the United States and for the first time placed an emphasis on peacetime preparedness. Yet with its passage, Congress never fully funded the program. But Congress did recognize the value of a professional officer education program by enhancing existing general service schools such as the Command and General Staff School at Fort Leavenworth, Kansas, and the Army War College at Washington Barracks, District of Columbia. The act authorized the establishing new schools to meet modern military educational needs, such as the Army Industrial College in 1924. Thirty-one additional special service schools were established or improved to provide training to the various branches of the Army.

The act established the division as a basic Army unit, replacing the pre-World War I notion of the regiment in war planning. Tactically and administratively, each corps area commander was the senior army officer for his geographical area, typically functioning as a commanding general of an existing Regular Army corps or division in their area. During times of civil unrest, labor strikes, or natural disasters, corps area commanders provided Army resources needed to address the emergency.

Each corps area was allocated two "type" corps (with a standard table of organization) and six infantry divisions. The corps were numbered in accord with their corps area designation, i.e. I and XI Corps in the First Corps Area. The lower numbered corps (I through IX) consisted of one Regular Army and two National Guard divisions among the various states of the corps area. The higher numbered corps (XI through XIX) each consisted of three divisions, also assigned by state boundaries, of the newly established (but rarely funded) Organized Reserve. By 1925, in the face of steady Coolidge Administration and congressional budget cutting, the United States Army only had three active regular divisions nationwide; the remainder of its divisions, both regular and reserve components, only existed on paper.

The amended National Defense Act also grouped three corps areas into an "army level" mobilization organization whose boundaries were also identical for the two "type" armies located within them. For example, First, Second, and Third Corps Areas, and the First and Fourth (Field) Armies, comprised the First "Army Area". The 1921 mobilization planning that created the six field army headquarters did not envision a need for active field army-level commands in peacetime and thus the headquarters were constituted in the Organized Reserve rather than the Regular Army.

Until fully activated with its own headquarters staff, an army area was typically jointly staffed, headquartered, and commanded by the most senior corps commander in that area. Between 1927 and 1933 all six field army headquarters were deactivated as the Army wrestled with structure, mobilization, and manpower issues.

== Corps area and army area organizations, 1921-1932 ==
An army area included three corps areas, and in the early years was concurrently staffed and headquartered with one of the corps areas. For example, First Army Area headquarters staff was also the Second Corps Area headquarters staff based at Fort Jay at Governors Island in New York, New York; Sixth Corps Area provided the Second Army Area headquarters staff.

=== First Army Area ===
First Army Area included First Army (Active) and Fourth Army (reserve on paper).

- First Corps Area replaced the Northeastern Department, and was headquartered in Boston Army Base, Massachusetts, encompassing Maine, Massachusetts, New Hampshire, Rhode Island, Vermont and Connecticut. It was responsible for the mobilization, and administration of the First United States Army (1936–38); the Fourth Army, I Army Corps with 9th Division, 26th Division, 43d Division; XI Corps with three divisions; coast defense units of the First Coast Artillery District, some units of the GHQ Reserve, and the Zone of the Interior support units of the First Corps Area Service Command. First Corps Area was redesignated First CASC in May 1941.
- Second Corps Area replaced the Eastern Department, headquartered at Fort Jay on Governors Island in New York City and encompassed New York, New Jersey, Delaware and from 1921 to 1937, the District of Puerto Rico.
- Formations included the United States First Army (1921–36 and 1938–41); Fourth Army (1921–33); the II Corps (United States), with the 1st Infantry Division, the only active division in the area; the 27th Infantry Division of the New York National Guard; and the 44th Infantry Division of the New Jersey, New York, and Delaware National Guards; and XII Corps (United States), assigned the 77th Division, 78th Division, and 98th Division of the Organized Reserves. Also in the corps area was the 21st Cavalry Division (United States) of the New York, Pennsylvania, Rhode Island, and New Jersey National Guards; the 61st Cavalry Division of the Organized Reserves; the Second Coast Artillery District; and the Second Corps Area Service Command.
- Third Corps Area variously headquartered at Fort McHenry and Fort Howard in Baltimore, Maryland and included Pennsylvania, Maryland, District of Columbia and Virginia. Responsible for units of the First and Fourth Armies, III Army Corps (8th, 28, 29 Divisions) and XIII Army Corps (79th, 80th, 99th Divisions, coast defense units of the Third Coast Artillery District, select units of the GHQ Reserve, and the Z.I. support units of the Third CASC. From 15 October 1921, included the 62nd Cavalry Division, Organized Reserves (also part of Fourth Army); included the 2d Observation Wing, later 2d Wing, from 20 August 1920. From 1921 to 30 September 1927, Washington D.C. was withdrawn from the Third Corps Area and established as the District of Washington. After discontinuation, DC duties were taken on by the 16th Infantry Brigade. The 14th Aero Squadron (or 14th Bombardment Squadron) was assigned to the Third Corps Area, August 28, 1933 and then transferred to the 9th Bombardment Group, on March 1, 1935. From 1940 to 1942, Third Corps Area was commanded by Walter S. Grant, and the organization was designated the Third Corps Area Service Command in May 1941.

=== Second Army Area ===
Second Army Area included Second Army (Active) and Fifth Army (reserve on paper).

- Fourth Corps Area replaced the Southeastern Department based in Charleston, South Carolina and was originally headquartered there then transferred to Atlanta, Georgia, and encompassed the states of Alabama (for a period), Florida, Georgia, Louisiana, Mississippi, North Carolina, South Carolina and Tennessee. Formations included Third Army (1936–40); IV Corps: 4th Division, 30th Division, 31st Division; XIV Corps: 81st Division, 82d Division, 87th Division; Fourth Coast Artillery District; and Fourth Corps Area Service Command.
- Fifth Corps Area was established on 20 August 1920 with headquarters at Fort Benjamin Harrison, Indiana, and organized from parts of the discontinued Central Department. The headquarters was transferred to Fort Hayes, Columbus, Ohio, on 20 June 1922. The Fifth Corps Area included the states of Indiana, Ohio, West Virginia, and Kentucky. The headquarters was responsible for the units of the Second and Fifth Armies, the V Army Corps (5th, 37th, and 38th Divisions) and XV Army Corps (83rd, 84th, 100th Infantry Divisions), select GHQ Reserve units, and Zone of the Interior support units of the Fifth Corps Area Support Command. Mobile units of the corps area, less GHQ Reserve and Z.I. units, were assigned to the Second and Fifth Armies from 1921 to 1933. With the adoption of the four field army plan on 1 October 1933, the units of the Fifth Corps Area were reassigned to the Second Army, GHQR, or demobilized.
- Sixth Corps Area covered the states of Wisconsin, Michigan and Illinois and Jefferson Barracks, Missouri. The headquarters was established at Fort Sheridan, Illinois, in August 1920, from portions of the former Central Department, but then moved to the U.S. Post Office Building at 1819 West Pershing Road in Chicago on 10 October 1921. Sixth Corps Area was responsible for the mobilization, administration, and training of units of the Second and Fifth Armies, I Cavalry Corps (Regular Army, but inactive, 1927–1940), VI Army Corps (including the Regular Army 6th Division, 32d and 33rd Divisions) and XVI Army Corps (85th, 86th, 101st Divisions), select GHQ Reserve units, and the Zone of the Interior support units of the Sixth Corps Area Support Command.

=== Third Army Area ===
Third Army Area included Third Army (Active), including, seemingly, the Reserve 23rd Cavalry Division (United States), and Sixth Army (reserve on paper).

- Seventh Corps Area initially included Kansas, Minnesota, Missouri (but not Jefferson Barracks), North Dakota, South Dakota, Iowa and Nebraska. Responsibility for Arkansas was transferred from the Fourth Corps Area to the Seventh Corps Area on 1 December 1920. The headquarters was established on 20 August 1920 with headquarters at Fort Crook, Nebraska, again from elements of the previous Central Department. HQ, Seventh Corps Area moved to Fort Omaha, NE, on 27 May 1922 and further moved to the Army Building at 15th and Dodge Streets in Omaha - the Omaha Army Depot - on 25 March 1929.
- Eighth Corps Area, variously headquartered in Dallas and Fort Sam Houston in San Antonio, Texas, replaced the Southern Department and included Texas, Oklahoma, Colorado, New Mexico and Arizona.
- Ninth Corps Area, headquartered at the Presidio of San Francisco, California, replaced the Western Department and included Alaska, Idaho, Montana, California, Wyoming, Washington, Utah, Nevada and Oregon. Included the 41st Division, the 91st Division; the 18th Squadron (Observation) from October 1921 to July 1922; the 19th Squadron (Pursuit) October 1921-June 1922; and the 7th Bombardment Group from 1 June 1928 - c. 30 October 1931, and then again from c. 1 October 1933 - 1 March 1935. 17th Attack Group was located at March Field from 1931 but reported to the 1st Bombardment Wing. The 91st Aero Squadron, later the 91st Observation Squadron, was almost continuously associated with the Ninth Corps Area from its reformation on 20 August 1920 until 1940. The 805th Observation Squadron was constituted in the Organized Reserve (Oregon) on 31 March 1924; and was then consolidated on 8 December 1936, with the 805th Aero Squadron. Its mission was to provide aerial observation support to the Commanding General, Ninth Corps Area. The 805th Observation Squadron was inactivated on 11 June 1937 and then disbanded on 31 May 1942. Immediately after the Utah prisoner of war massacre in 1945, Private Clarence Bertucchi was placed under guard at Fort Douglas, Utah at the headquarters of what had become the Ninth Service Command.

The Civilian Conservation Corps was organized roughly along army corps area boundaries since most of the logistical administration and support (food, housing, uniforms, transportation) for this 1930s Great Depression-era emergency work program was provided by the U.S. Army. The corps areas provided Regular Army officers to oversee these tasks. In time, they were replaced by officers of the Organized Reserve, freeing Regular Army officers to return to their assigned duties and providing practical experience to the Reserve officers.

== Continental defense commands 1932-1946 ==
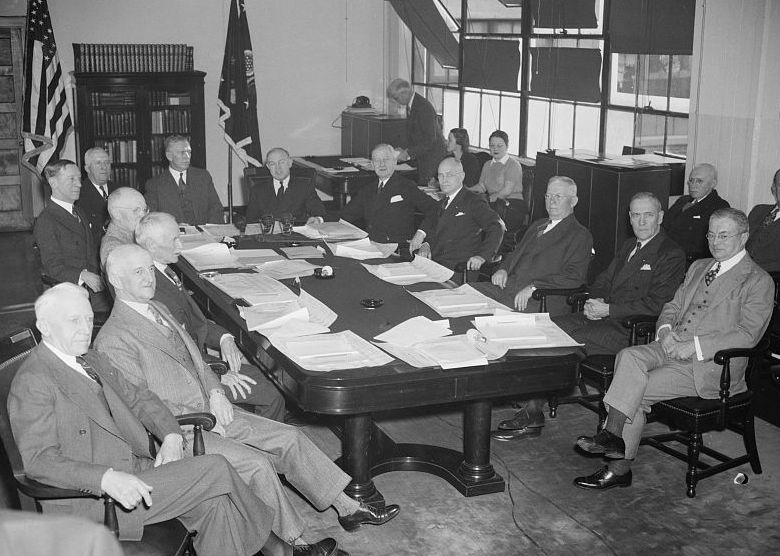
Corps area commanding generals meet with the Chief of Staff and Secretary of War in Washington, D.C., 1 Dec. 1939.

General Douglas MacArthur, the Army's Chief of Staff, believed that the 1921 Pershing mobilization plan was based on unsound assumptions and that the Army required active field army headquarters before the start of any mobilization to manage the integration and training of subordinate units as they mobilized. He also concluded that the existing three army area/six army arrangement was too ponderous to field a force that might be needed in a hurry and that existing mobilization plans were not flexible enough to tailor to various war plans then in existence.

After a War Department study, MacArthur on 9 August 1932 constituted three new army headquarters in the Regular Army (the headquarters of the First United States Army was already constituted) and outlined the organization of what became known as the "four army" plan, which effectively abolished the three army area/six army system and replaced it with four army areas - (1) North Atlantic States, (2) Upper Mississippi Basin, (3) Southern & Southwestern States, (4) Western. & Northwestern States. Much of these plans were put on hold after MacArthur's use of troops against the Bonus Army in 1932.

On 3 October 1940, the War Department transferred tactical command functions to the newly-activated General Headquarters, U.S. Army, separating the field armies from the corps areas. Corps areas were then limited to their Zone of the Interior functions as service commands and the field armies assumed control of all tactical units.

In 1942, after the start of World War II and by executive order, the army level organizations took to training or the field as home defense and combat commands under the control of Army Ground Forces. In March 1942, home defense and training activities were assigned to the newly formed Eastern, Central, Southern, and Western Defense Commands, which overlaid the existing Corps Areas under a new Continental Defense Organization. The geographical corps areas were redesigned as numbered service commands under the Services of Supply on 22 July 1942 (renamed in 1943 as Army Service Forces, the ASF). They served the Army's supply system, and performed administration, and "housekeeping" functions within the United States such as the issuance of Army serial numbers and the operation of induction centers and army posts located in the United States and its territories. By this time, the corps area boundaries and departments experienced some minor readjustments:

- Eastern Defense Command (co-headquartered with First Army until October 1943)
  - 1st Corps Area – ME, VT, NH, MA, CT, RI
  - 2nd Corps Area – NY, NJ, DE
  - 3rd Corps Area – PA, MD, VA, DC
  - 4th Corps Area – NC, SC, GA, FL, AL, MS, TN
- Central Defense Command (co-headquartered with Second Army)
  - 5th Corps Area – OH, IN, KY, WV
  - 6th Corps Area – IL, MI, WI
  - 7th Corps Area – MO, KS, NE, CO, IA, MN, ND, SD, WY
- Southern Defense Command (co-headquartered with Third Army until December 1943)
  - 8th Corps Area – AR, LA, TX, OK, NM
- Western Defense Command (co-headquartered with Fourth Army)
  - 9th Corps Area – WA, OR, CA, AZ, ID, MT, NV, UT, AK
- Hawaiian Department
- Panama Canal Department
- Philippine Department
- Puerto Rican Department

== Patch-Simpson Board / army areas 1946-1973 ==
On 30 August 1945, Army Chief of Staff General George Marshall created a board headed by Lieutenant General Alexander M. Patch to review the organization of the War Department. The board had no officers from the ASF staff but two came from the technical services. The board included Maj. Gens. Charles T. Harris (Coast Artillery), H.A. Craig (Army Air Forces), Harry C. Ingles (Signal Corps), and Brig. Gen. Gordon E. Textor (Corps of Engineers). When General Patch died on November 21, Lt. Gen. William H. Simpson, former commander of the Ninth Army, became chairman. The board submitted its recommendations to the Chief of Staff on 18 October. These were that the technical services be continued, with the Transportation Corps made permanent, and that the Finance Department becoming an eighth technical service. The service commands would be abolished, and their functions transferred to the Armies. The ASF would also be abolished, and its staff sections transferred to the War Department General Staff. The Patch-Simpson Board submitted its final report in January 1946.

In accordance with these recommendations, on 11 June 1946, Army Service Forces and the five of the nine service commands areas were abolished. The service commands were replaced by six field army level organizations. These six Army Areas, though similar in name, operated on a functional rather than geographic basis but roughly followed along the old corps areas boundaries.

- First Army Area, headquartered at Fort Jay in New York, New York included ME, NH, VT, MA, RI, CT, NJ, NY and DE. From Headquarters Second Service Command.
- Second Army Area, headquartered at Baltimore, Maryland included PA, MD, VA, WV, OH, IN and KY. From Headquarters Third Service Command.
- Third Army Area, headquartered variously in rented office space in downtown Atlanta and in 1946 at Fort McPherson in Atlanta, Georgia included NC, SC, GA, FL, AL, TN and MS. From Headquarters Fourth Service Command to the temporary Seventh Army, to be succeeded by Third Army when Third Army returned from Germany. Seventh Army was inactivated in Atlanta on 15 March 1947.
- Fourth Army Area, headquartered at Fort Sam Houston in San Antonio, Texas included TX, AR, LA, OK, and NM. From Headquarters Eighth Service Command.
- Fifth Army Area, headquartered at Fort Sheridan near Chicago, Illinois included IL, MI, WI, MN, IA, MO, KS, NE, ND, SD, WY and CO. From Headquarters Sixth Service Command.
- Sixth Army Area, headquartered at Presidio of San Francisco, California included WA, OR, ID, MT, UT, NV and CA.

However, several of the service commands were retained as area commands:

- e. "Headquarters, First Service Command will remain at Boston, Massachusetts, as an area command under the Commanding General, First Army, with functions and duties as prescribed by him.
- f. Headquarters, Fifth Service Command, will remain at Columbus, Ohio, as an area command under the Commanding General, Second Army, with functions and duties as prescribed by him.
- g. Headquarters, Seventh Service Command, will remain at Omaha, Nebraska, as an area command under the Commanding General, Fifth Army, with functions and duties as prescribed by him.
- h. Headquarters, Ninth Service Command, will remain at Salt Lake City, Utah, as an area command under the Commanding General, Sixth Army, with functions and duties as prescribed by him."

This organizational scheme served until the Army reorganization of 1973, with the creation of Forces Command and Training and Doctrine Command.

== See also ==
- Structure of the United States Army
- History of the United States Army
