= Antiaircraft Command (United States) =

American anti-aircraft army command

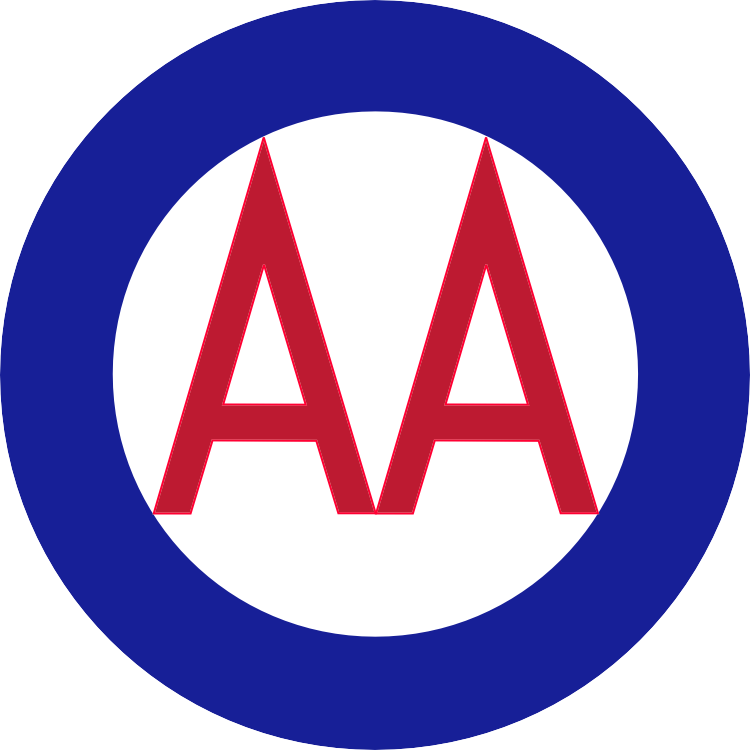
Army Antiaircraft Command 1942-1950

Antiaircraft Command (United States) (AAC) was a command of the US Army during World War II in charge of anti-aircraft defenses across the continental U.S. Prior to the creation of the AAC, the US Army had established four defense commands for both antiaircraft and coastal defense: Northeastern (later Eastern), Southern, Central and Western. Alaska was originally part of the Western Defense Command, but would be separated as the Alaska Defense Command in November 1943. The Eastern Defense Command would take over the Central Defense Command in January 1944 and the Southern Defense Command in March 1945.

In March 1942 the commands were reorganized and Anti-Aircraft artillery was separated from Coastal Defense Artillery - and the Antiaircraft Command (AAC) was born. Major General Joseph A. Green was placed in command. Their first main job was to split the Anti-Aircraft Artillery (AAA) regiments into battalions so they could be easily moved to wherever the need was most severe. The AAC also divided into four regions which generally mapped to the army's defense commands. In October 1945, Green was replaced by Major General John L. Homer who would remain the commander of AAC until his retirement in October 1950.

World War II Antiaircraft Commands
Eastern Antiaircraft Command	Central Antiaircraft Command	Southern Antiaircraft Command	Western Antiaircraft Command

After the war the AAC was redesignated the Army Air Defense Command in 1950, and coastal artillery and AAA were again under one command.

== See also ==
- Western Defense Command
- Central Defense Command
- Southern Defense Command
- Eastern Defense Command
- Alaska Defense Command
- Caribbean Defense Command
