= Battle of Kasserine Pass =

Part of the Tunisia Campaign of World War II

- Part of the Tunisian campaign of World War II
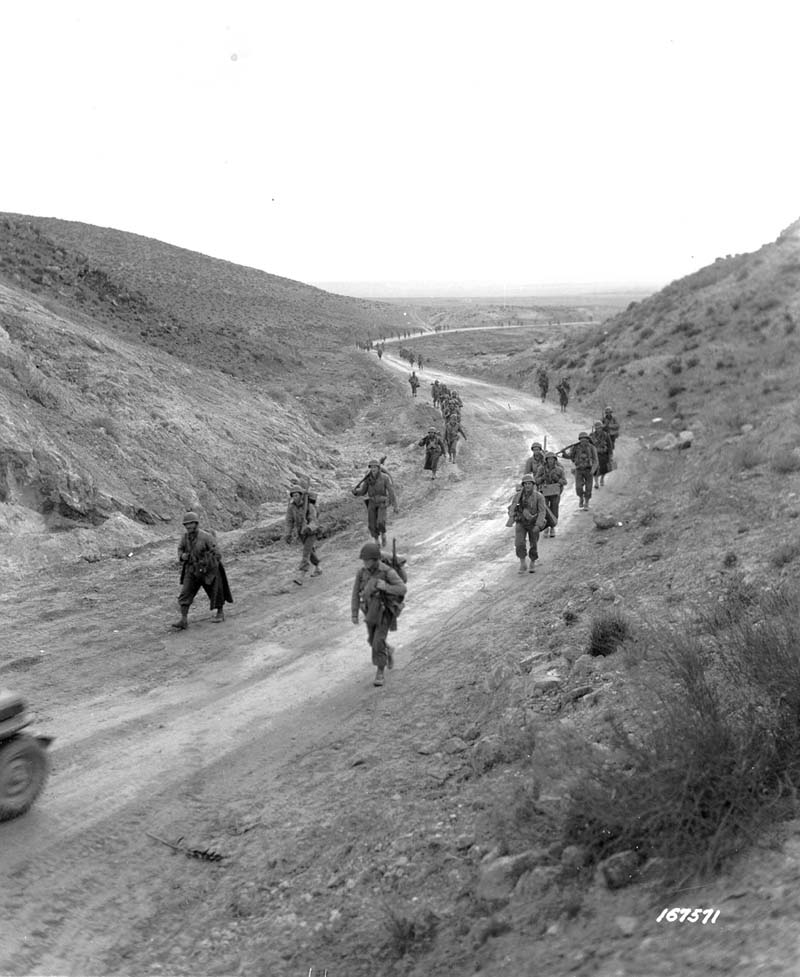
- Men of the 2nd Battalion, 16th Infantry Regiment of the U.S. 1st Infantry Division march through the Kasserine Pass and on to Kasserine and Farriana, Tunisia February 26, 1943.
Date	February 19–24, 1943
Location	Kasserine Pass, Kasserine, Tunisia 35°15′35″N 8°44′33″E
Result	See Aftermath section

Belligerents
United States; United Kingdom; Free France	Germany; Italy

Commanders and leaders
(United Kingdom) Kenneth Anderson (United States) Lloyd Fredendall (Free France) Alphonse Juin	(Nazi Germany) Erwin Rommel (Nazi Germany) Hans-Jürgen von Arnim (Kingdom of Italy) Giorgio Carlo Calvi

Units involved
(United Kingdom) First Army; (United States) II Corps; (United Kingdom) 6th Armoured Division	(Nazi Germany) 5th Panzer Army; (Nazi Germany) 21st Panzer Division; (Nazi Germany) 10th Panzer Division; (Kingdom of Italy) 131st Armored Division "Centauro"

Strength
30,000 infantry	22,000 infantry 212 tanks

Casualties and losses
United States; 3,300 killed and wounded 3,000 POWs; 183 tanks lost 616 vehicles lost 208 guns lost Free France; 500 killed and wounded United Kingdom; ~2–3,000 killed, wounded or captured Total: 10,000 casualties	989 killed or wounded 608 captured 20 tanks lost 67 vehicles lost 14 guns lost

The Battle of Kasserine Pass was a series of engagements which took place from 19–24 February 1943 around Kasserine Pass, a 2-mile-wide (3.2 km) gap in the Grand Dorsal chain of the Atlas Mountains in west central Tunisia. It was a part of the Tunisian campaign of World War II.

The Axis forces, led by Generalfeldmarschall Erwin Rommel, were primarily from the Afrika Korps Assault Group, the Italian Centauro Armored Division and two Panzer divisions detached from the 5th Panzer Army. The Allied forces were from the U.S. II Corps (Major General Lloyd Fredendall), the British 6th Armoured Division (Major General Charles Keightley) and other parts of the First Army (Lieutenant General Kenneth Anderson).

The battle was the first major engagement between U.S. and Axis forces in Africa. The participating American battalions suffered many casualties and were successively pushed back over 50 miles (80 km) from their original positions west of Faïd Pass, until they met an advancing brigade of the U.S. 1st Armored Division. British forces were also driven back, losing all 11 of their tanks in the process. After these reverses, Allied reinforcements backed by strong artillery support halted the Axis offensive at Djebel el Ahma and Thala. By this point, Rommel was overextended and low on reserves, fuel and ammunition. Faced with such logistical problems alongside Allied counterattacks, Axis forces relinquished all their territorial gains and withdrew under heavy bombardment from the Kasserine Pass by 24 February.

Anderson was subsequently criticised by his contemporaries for, among other things, dispersing the three combat commands of the 1st Armored Division, despite the objections of the divisional commander, Major General Orlando Ward. As a result of lessons learned in this battle, the U.S. Army instituted sweeping changes in unit organization and tactics, and replaced some commanders and some types of equipment.

== Background ==
U.S. and British forces landed at several points along the coast of French Morocco and Algeria on November 8, 1942, during Operation Torch. This came only days after the breakthrough of the British Eighth Army (Lieutenant-General Bernard Montgomery) following the Second Battle of El Alamein. In response, German and Italian troops were ferried in from Sicily to occupy Tunisia, one of the few easily defended areas of North Africa and only one night's sail from bases in Sicily. This short passage made it very difficult for Allied naval vessels to intercept Axis transports, and air interdiction proved equally difficult, because the nearest Allied airbase to Tunisia, at Malta, was over 200 mi (320 km) away.

Sketch map of Tunisia during the 1942–43 campaign

The Run for Tunis in November and December 1942 is the term for an attempt to reach Tunis before German and Italian reinforcements could arrive. Because of the poor road and rail communications, only a small, division-sized Allied force could be supplied and due to the excellent defensive terrain, small numbers of German and Italian troops were sufficient to defeat the attempt. The Allied build-up continued, more aircraft became available and new airfields in eastern Algeria and Tunisia were built. The Allies reduced the flow of Axis troops and equipment into Tunis and Bizerta, but a sizable Axis force was already ashore.

On January 23, 1943, the Allied Eighth Army took Tripoli, Erwin Rommel's main supply base. Rommel had anticipated this, switching his line of supply to Tunis with the goal of blocking the southern approach to Tunisia from Tripoli at Gabès. The Mareth Line, which the French had built to protect against an Italian attack from Libya, was

... a line of antiquated French blockhouses, which in no way measured up to the standards required by modern warfare....

— Rommel

Allied troops had already crossed the Atlas Mountains and set up a forward base at Faïd, in the foothills on the eastern arm of the mountains, an excellent position to thrust east to the coast, split the Axis forces in southern Tunisia from the forces further north, and cut the line of supply to Tunis.

== Prelude ==
=== Faïd Pass ===
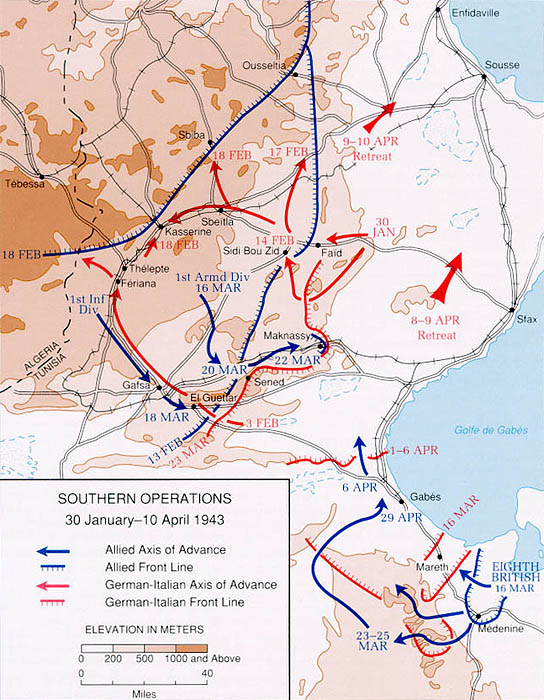
Tunisia, January 30 – April 10, 1943

Elements of the 5th Panzer Army, headed by General Hans-Jürgen von Arnim, reached the Allied positions on the eastern foot of the Atlas Mountains on January 30. The 21st Panzer Division met French troops at Faïd, and, despite excellent use of the French 75 mm (2.95 in) guns, which caused heavy casualties among the German infantry, the defenders were easily forced back. (Note: Poorly equipped and supplied with World War I-era light artillery and ammunition, including outmoded shrapnel rounds, the French were nonetheless expert artillerymen and occasionally hammered German patrols and infantry attempting to negotiate the narrow passes.)

U.S. artillery and tanks of the 1st Armored Division then entered the battle, destroying some enemy tanks and forcing the remainder into what appeared to be a headlong retreat. This was, however, a trap, and when the 1st Armored Division gave chase it was engaged by a screen of German anti-tank guns, and sustained heavy casualties. A U.S. forward artillery observer whose radio and landlines had been cut by shellfire recalled,

It was murder. They rolled right into the muzzles of the concealed eighty-eights and all I could do was stand by and watch tank after tank blown to bits or burst into flames or just stop, wrecked. Those in the rear tried to turn back but the eighty-eights seemed to be everywhere.

— Westrate, 1944

The 21st Panzer Division resumed its advance towards Faïd. American infantry casualties were exacerbated by the practice of digging shallow shell scrapes instead of foxholes, as German tank drivers could easily crush a man inside a scrape by driving into it and simultaneously making a half-turn. Several attempts were made by the 1st Armored Division to stop the German advance, but all three combat commands found that each defensive position they tried to occupy had already been overrun, and they were attacked by German troops with heavy losses. On February 2, the 1st Armored Division was ordered to end its attacks and concentrate to form a reserve. The Germans captured most of Tunisia, and the entrances into the coastal lowlands were blocked. The Allies held the interior of the roughly triangular Atlas range, but with the exits blocked this was of little advantage to the Allies. For the next two weeks, Rommel and the Axis commanders further north debated what to do next.

=== Sidi Bou Zid ===
Rommel did not consider the Eighth Army a serious threat because, until Tripoli was open, Montgomery could maintain only a small force in south Tunisia. Ships commenced unloading on February 9 but the port was not fully operational until the end of the month. Rommel made a proposal in early February to Comando Supremo (Italian High Command in Rome) to attack with two battlegroups, including detachments from the 5th Panzer Army, toward two U.S. supply bases just to the west of the western arm of the mountains in Algeria. A quick thrust could capture the supplies and disrupt a U.S. attempt to concentrate forces near Tébessa. Arnim objected and the attack was delayed for a week until agreement was reached to mount Operation Frühlingswind, a thrust by the 5th Panzer Army through the U.S. communications and supply center of Sidi Bou Zid. Rommel's forces, 60 miles (97 km) to the south-west, would conduct Operation Morgenluft to capture Gafsa and advance on Tozeur.

On February 14 the 10th and 21st Panzer divisions began the Battle of Sidi Bou Zid, about 10 mi (16 km) west of Faïd, in the interior plain of the Atlas Mountains. The U.S. tanks were defeated and the infantry, poorly sited on three hills and unable to give mutual support, was isolated. A counterattack the next day was easily repulsed and on February 16 the Germans advanced towards Sbeitla. After the success at Sidi Bou Zid, Rommel ordered the Afrika Korps Assault Group to attack Gafsa on February 15, but the night before, Anderson ordered the defenders to evacuate Gafsa and make the main defence line the hills around Feriana, as he believed Gafsa should not be defended against a large attack. The next day, because of the threat to the southern flank, Anderson obtained Eisenhower's agreement and ordered a withdrawal from the Eastern Dorsale, to the line of the Western Dorsale from Feriana northwards. Early on February 17, Fredendall ordered a withdrawal from Sbeitla and Feriana. The U.S. II Corps was able to concentrate at the Kasserine and Sbiba Passes, on the western arm of the mountains. U.S. casualties were 2,546 men, 103 tanks, 280 vehicles, 18 field guns, three anti-tank guns and an anti-aircraft battery.

=== Axis plan of attack ===
At this point, there was some argument in the Axis camp about what to do next; all of Tunisia was under Axis control, and there was little to do until the Eighth Army arrived at Mareth. Rommel decided to attack through the Kasserine Pass into the main force of the U.S. II Corps at Tébessa to capture U.S. supplies on the Algerian side of the western arm of the mountains, eliminate the Allied ability to attack the coastal corridor linking Mareth and Tunis and threaten the southern flank of the First Army. On February 18, Rommel submitted his proposals to Albert Kesselring, who forwarded them with his blessing to the Comando Supremo in Rome.

At 13:30 on February 19, Rommel received the Comando Supremo's agreement to a revised plan. He was to have 10th and 21st Panzer Divisions transferred from Arnim's 5th Panzer Army to his command and attack through the Kasserine and Sbiba passes toward Thala and Le Kef to the north, clearing the Western Dorsale and threatening the 1st Army's flank. (Note: Arnim only released a battlegroup under Felix von Broich.) Rommel was appalled; the plan dispersed Axis forces and, through the passes, would expose their flanks. A concentrated attack on Tébessa, while entailing some risk, could yield badly needed supplies, destroy Allied potential for operations into central Tunisia and capture Youks-les-Bains Airfield, west of Tébessa.

== Battle ==
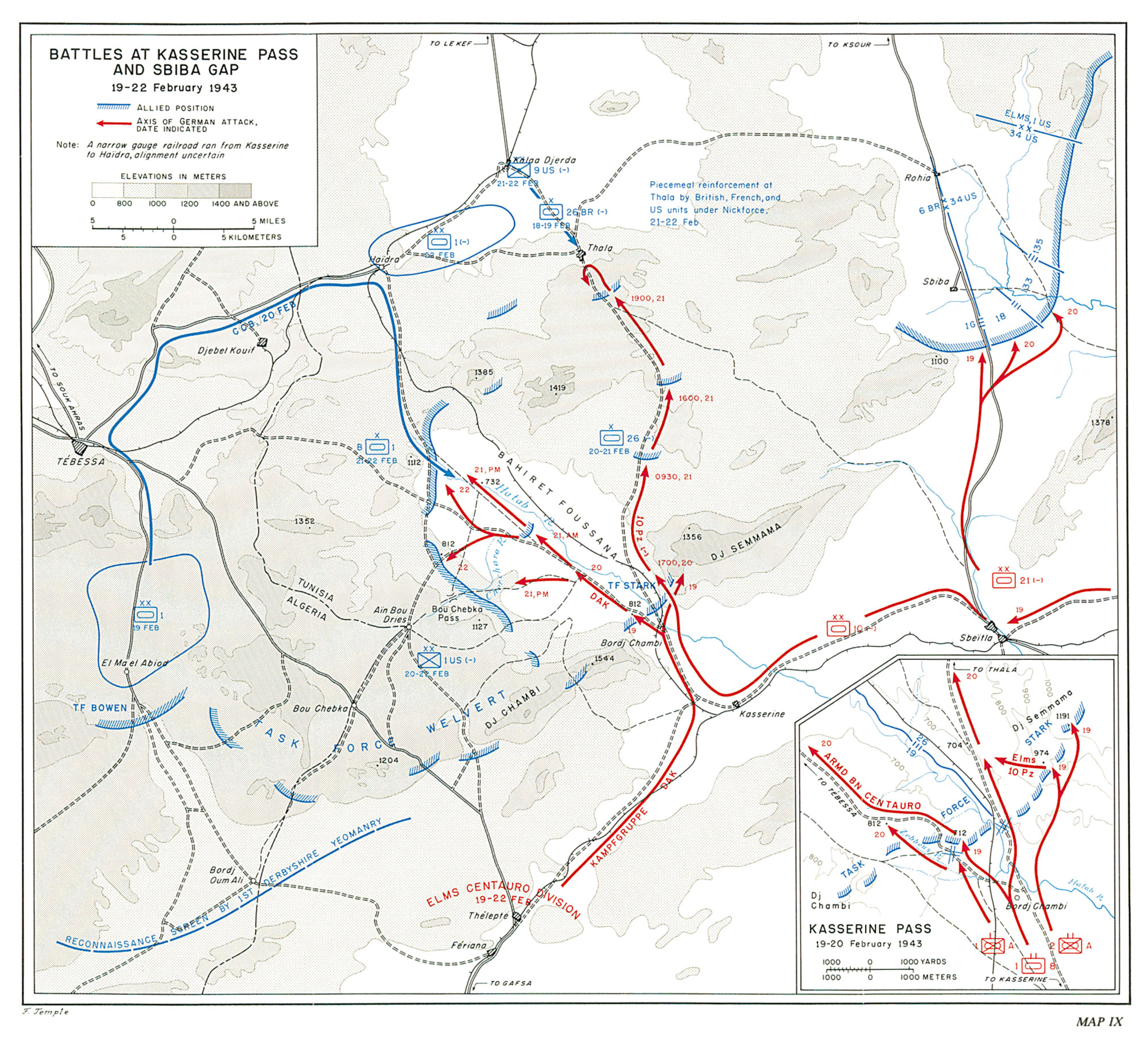
Battle of Kasserine Pass

In the early hours of February 19, Rommel ordered the Afrika Korps Assault Group from Feriana to attack the Kasserine Pass. The 21st Panzer Division at Sbeitla was ordered to attack northward through the Sbiba Gap (east of Kasserine) toward Ksour. Kampfgruppe von Broich, the battlegroup released by von Arnim from 10th Panzer Division, was ordered to concentrate at Sbeitla, where it would be ready to exploit success in either pass.

=== Sbiba ===
The Sbiba area was attacked by Battle Groups Stenkhoff and Schuette, remnants of the 21st Panzer Division. Facing the German armored advance was the British 6th Armoured Division (less the 26th Armoured Brigade which except for the tanks of the 16/5th Lancers had been sent to Thala). Also in the line was the U.S. 18th Regimental Combat Team from the 1st Infantry Division; and three battalions of infantry from the 34th Infantry Division. There were also three U.S. Field Artillery battalions, elements of two British anti-tank regiments and some French detachments. The Germans made little progress against the combined firepower of the defending force which had also laid minefields. The 21st Panzer Division was checked and then driven back by February 20.

=== Kasserine ===
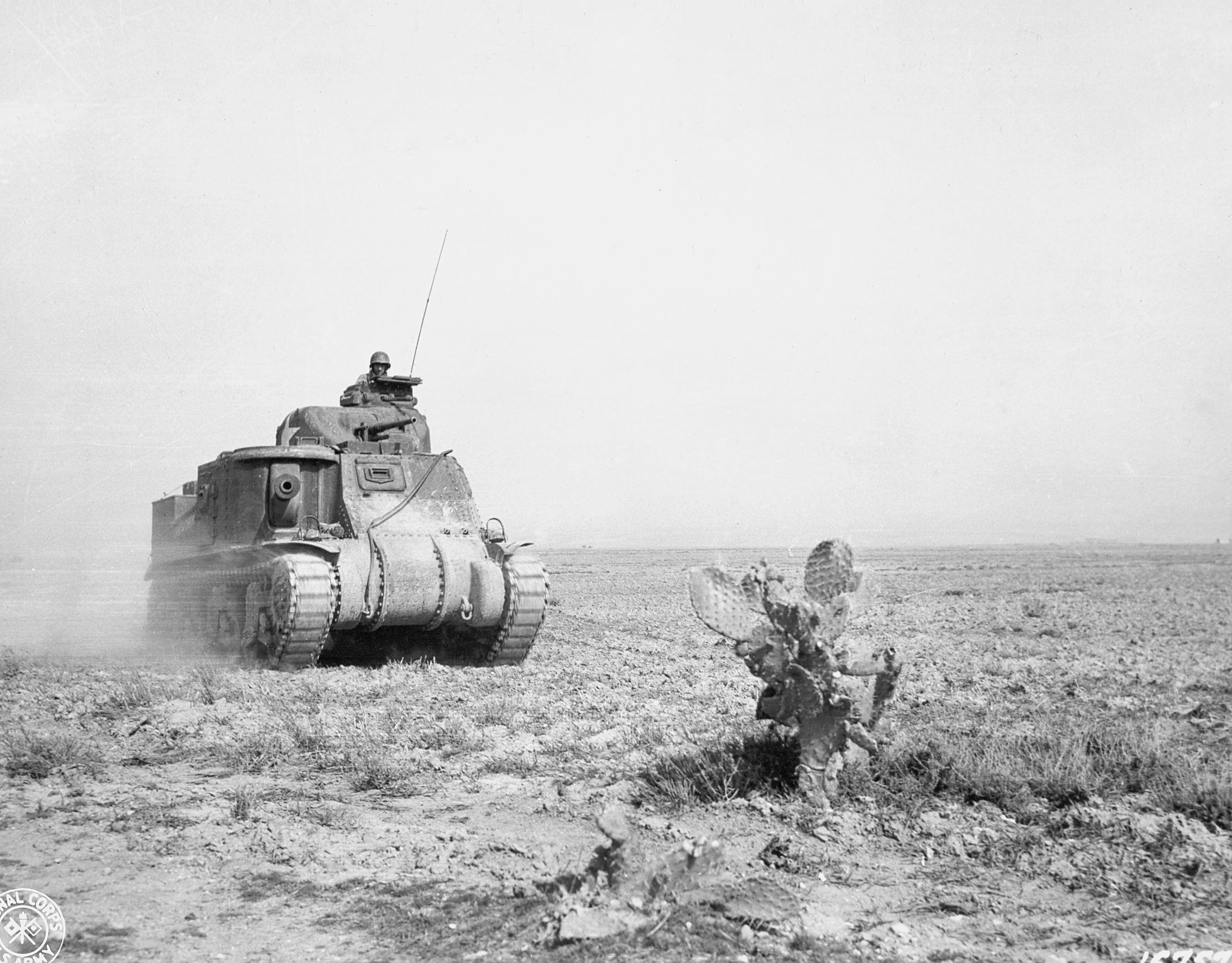
An M3 Lee tank of U.S. 1st Armored Division advancing to support American forces during the battle at Kasserine Pass

Defending the pass was a force consisting of the U.S. 1st Battalion, 26th Regimental Combat Team, the U.S. 19th Combat Engineer Regiment, the 6th Field Artillery Battalion, a tank destroyer battalion and a battery of French artillery. On the hills to their west was French General Welvert's Task Force Welvert comprising a U.S. Ranger and infantry battalion, three French infantry battalions, two U.S. field artillery battalions, four French artillery batteries and engineer and anti-aircraft detachments. Furthest west was Task Force Bowen (consisting of the 3rd Battalion of the 26th Regimental Combat Team), blocking the track from Feriana towards Tebessa. Between Task Force Bowen and Tebessa to the north was the regrouping 1st Armored Division although only Combat Command B was fit for combat. The positions in the pass had been placed under Colonel Alexander Stark, commander of the 26th RCT, on the night of February 18 and the command named Stark Force.

On the morning of the 19th an attempt by the 33rd Reconnaissance Unit to surprise the Kasserine defenses into the pass failed. A battalion of Panzer grenadiers was then ordered into the floor of the pass and another onto Djebel Semmama (the hill on its eastern flank), and slow progress was made against artillery fire. The tanks of 1/8th Panzer Regiment were committed at noon but little further progress resulted against stubborn defense. Rommel decided to commit his units from the 10th Panzer to the Kasserine Pass the next morning in a coordinated attack with the Afrika Korps Assault Group, which was to be joined by elements of the Italian 131st Armored Division Centauro. British reinforcements from the 26th Armoured Brigade had been assembling at Thala and Brigadier Charles Dunphie, making forward reconnaissance, decided to intervene. The First Army headquarters restricted him to sending Gore Force, a small combined-arms group of a company of infantry, a squadron of 11 tanks, an artillery battery and an anti-tank troop. Brigadier Cameron Nicholson (6th Armoured Division) was given command of Nickforce, all units north-west of the pass.

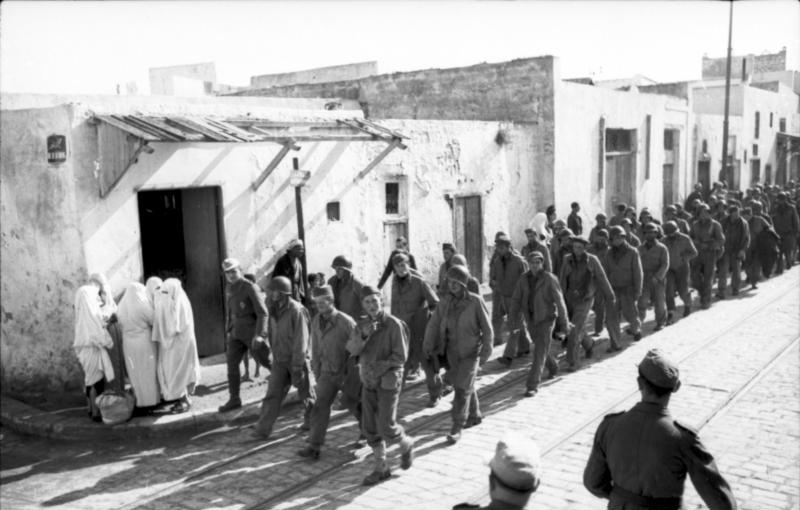
U.S. troops taken prisoner during the battle march through a Tunisian village.

During the night, the American positions on the two mountain shoulders overlooking the pass were overrun and at 8:30 am on February 20 German panzer grenadiers and Italian Bersaglieri resumed the attack. At 10:00 Dunphie judged that Stark Force was about to give way and ordered Gore Force to the Thala side of the pass, as elements of the Centauro Division launched their attack towards Tebessa and continued it during the afternoon. During the opening attack on key American positions at Djebel Chambi, the 5th Bersaglieri Regiment had made a frontal assault on U.S. positions that lasted most of the morning and finally carried the position, losing the regimental commander Colonel Bonfatti in the process. This action cracked open the Allied defenses, opening the road to Thala and Tebessa. By midday the accompanying combined Axis armored units poured through the pass routing U.S. forces of the 1st Armored Division in one of the worst U.S. defeats of the Tunisian Campaign. The Italian regiment was complimented by General Bülowius, commander of the DAK Assault Group, who cited their action as the instrumental event of the Axis victory. At 13:00 Rommel committed two battalions from 10th Panzer Division, which overcame the northern wing of the Allied defense. Tanks and Bersaglieri from the Centauro Division advanced along Highway 13 and overran the 19th Combat Engineer Regiment. The U.S. survivors made a disorganized retreat up the western exit from the pass to Djebel el Hamra, where Combat Command B of the 1st Armored Division was arriving. On the exit to Thala, Gore Force slowly leapfrogged back, losing all its tanks in the process, to rejoin the 26th Armoured Brigade some 10 miles (16 km) further back.

=== Djebel el Ahmar ===
The Afrika Korps Assault Group began moving along the Hatab River valley towards Haidra and Tebessa in the early afternoon of February 21 and advanced until they met defenders consisting of the U.S. 16th Infantry Regiment of the 1st Infantry Division and Combat Command B of the U.S. 1st Armored Division at Djebel el Hamra. The German–Italian force was halted and, despite heavy pressure including air attacks, failed to dislodge the American defenders. Having brought the Axis drive towards Tebessa to a halt, General Paul Robinett and General Terry Allen now turned their attention to planning a counterattack that was to take place the next day, February 22. Plans made by both sides were upset by the battle, and the Axis forces (5th Bersaglieri, a Semovente group from Centauro and 15 Panzer) launched another assault on the U.S. position on the morning of February 22 toward Bou Chebka Pass. Although the American defenders were pressed hard the line held and, by mid-afternoon, the U.S. infantry and tanks launched a counterattack that broke the combined German and Italian force. More than 400 Axis prisoners were taken as the counterattack was pressed into the Afrika Korps position.

=== Thala ===
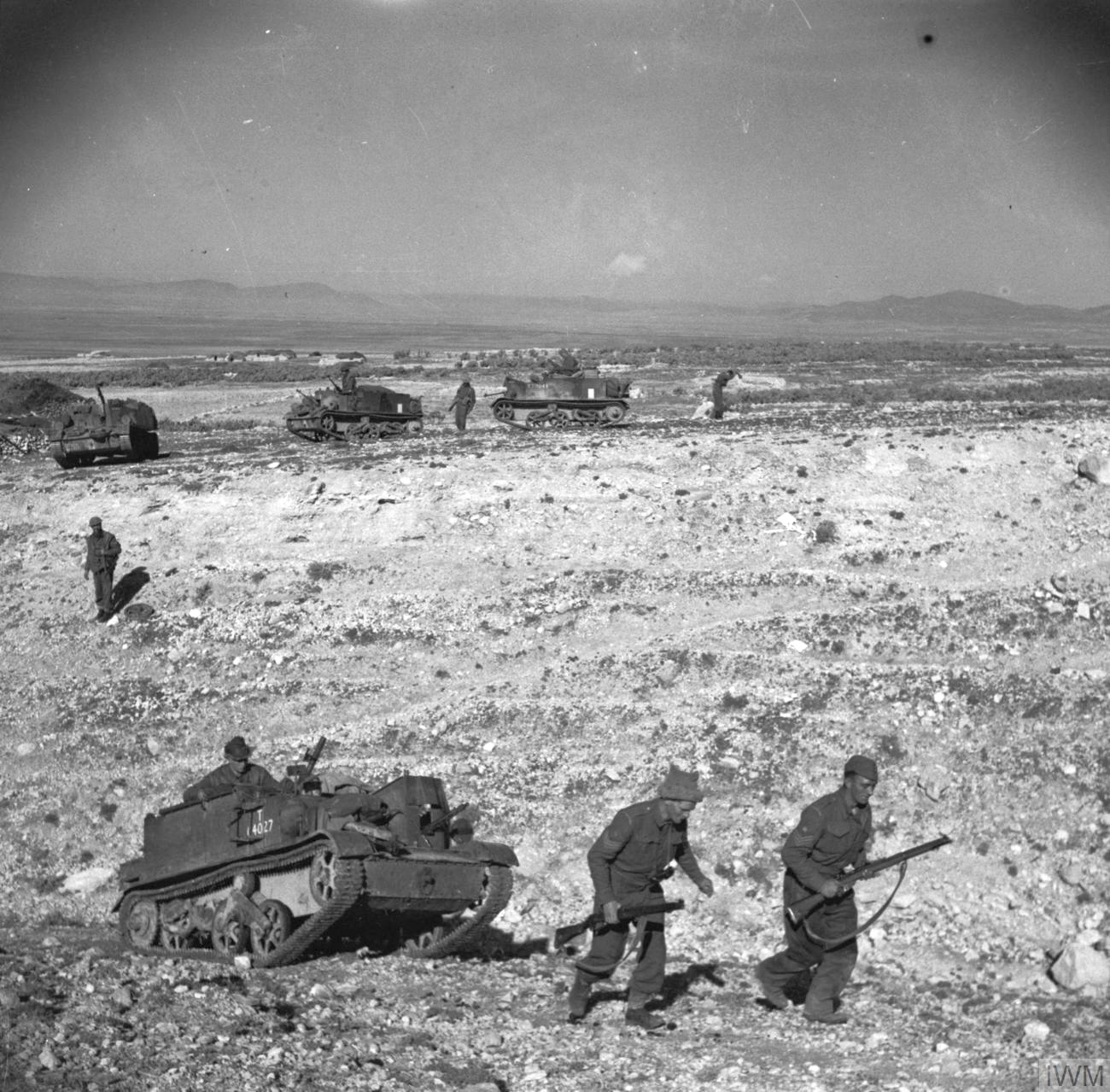
British soldiers of the 2nd Battalion, Grenadier Guards establishing positions on difficult terrain at Thala, February 24, 1943

Rommel had stayed with the main group of the 10th Panzer Division on the route north toward Thala, where the 26th Armoured Brigade and remnants of the U.S. 26th Infantry Regiment had dug in on ridges. If the town fell and the southern of two roads from Thala to Tebessa was cut, the U.S. 9th Infantry Division to the north would be cut off and Combat Command B of the 1st Armored Division would be trapped between the 10th Panzer Division and its supporting units moving north along the second road to Tebessa. The combined force fought a costly delaying action in front of Thala, retreating ridge by ridge to the north until by dark, the force stopped the German attack just south of the town in the evening of February 21. The divisional artillery (48 guns) of the 9th Infantry Division and anti-tank platoons, that had moved from Morocco on February 17, 800 mi (1,300 km) west, dug in that night.

Next day, the front was held mostly by British infantry, with exceptionally strong backing by unified U.S. and British artillery, under brigadier general Stafford LeRoy Irwin, the U.S. artillery commander. The British had 36 guns, supported by armoured cars of the Derbyshire Yeomanry and Valentine and Crusader tanks of the 17th/21st Lancers. Anderson had ordered the 9th Infantry Division and its artillery support to Le Kef to meet an expected German attack but U.S. Major General Ernest N. Harmon, who had been sent by Eisenhower to report on the battle and the Allied command, instructed the 9th divisional artillery to stay behind. On the morning of February 22 an intense artillery barrage from the massed Allied guns forestalled the resumption of the 10th Panzer Division attack, destroying armor and vehicles and disrupting communications. Broich, the battle group commander, decided to pause and regroup, but Allied reinforcements continued to arrive. Under constant fire, 10th Panzer waited until dark to retire from the battlefield.

=== Withdrawal ===
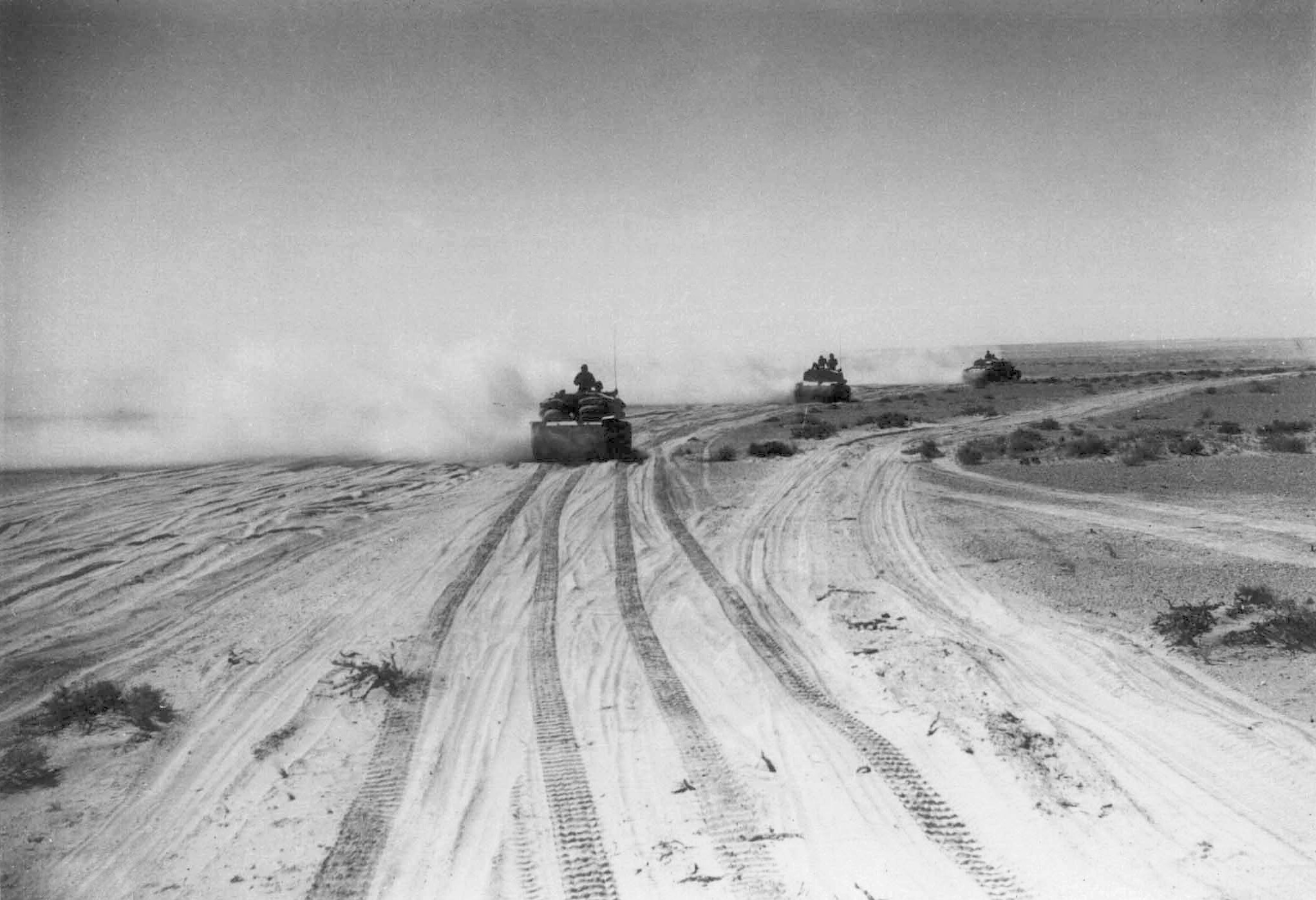
Italian Semovente assault guns

Overextended and with supplies dwindling, pinned down by the Allied artillery in the pass in front of Thala and now facing U.S. counterattacks along the Hatab River, Rommel realized his strength was spent. At Sbiba, along the Hatab River and now at Thala, the efforts of the German and Italian forces had failed to make a decisive break in the Allied line. With little prospect of further success, Rommel judged that it would be wiser to break off to concentrate in South Tunisia and strike a blow at the Eighth Army, catching them off balance while still assembling its forces. He at least had the consolation that he had inflicted heavy losses on his enemy and that the Allied concentrations in the Gafsa – Sbeitla area had been destroyed. At a meeting at Rommel's Kasserine HQ on February 23, Kesselring and his Chief of Staff Siegfried Westphal tried to change Rommel's mind, arguing that there were still possibilities for success. Rommel was adamant; Kesselring finally agreed and formal orders from the Comando Supremo in Rome were issued that evening calling off the offensive and directing all Axis units to return to their start positions. On February 23 a massive American air attack on the pass hastened the German retreat and by late February 24 the pass had been reoccupied, Feriana was in Allied hands; Sidi Bou Zid and Sbeitla followed soon after.

== Aftermath ==
The initial handful of American battalions suffered many casualties and were successively pushed back over 50 miles (80 km) from their original positions west of Faïd Pass, until they met an advancing brigade of the U.S. 1st Armored Division. British forces were also driven back, losing all 11 of their tanks in the process. After such reversals, Allied reinforcements with strong artillery support stopped the Axis advance. By the 22nd, the Axis force was low on fuel, ammunition and reserves, and the Allies were reinforcing their lines. Rommel wanted to concentrate in Southern Tunisia, to strike against the 8th Army. Rommel told Kesselring that continuing the offensive would have no chance of success, and Rommel was authorised to withdraw. On 23 and 24 February, the retreating Axis forces were subjected to "hammer-blow air attacks by the U.S. air force" in the Feriana—Kasserine area. By the end of the battle on February 24, the Kasserine Pass had been reoccupied by the Allies.

=== Casualties and losses ===
Shortly before his death in 1981, General Omar Bradley wrote that the series of battles were "the worst performance of the U.S. army in their whole proud history." American losses totalled 300 killed, 3,000 wounded, and 3,000 captured; 7,000 replacements were needed to recover units to their original strength. The French losses of the 34e Division totalled 50 killed, 200 wounded and 250 missing. Regarding Allied personnel captured, Rommel and acting commander of the 5th Panzer Army Generalleutnant Heinz Ziegler claimed 3,721 prisoners captured but in a consolidated report of February 24 they counted 4,026 Allied prisoners of war.

Materiel losses of the US II Corps were 183 tanks, 104 half-tracks, 208 guns and 512 trucks and motor vehicles were lost, some of them captured by the Germans. The Allies also lost supplies and fuel, since over 215 m^{3} (57,000 US gal) of gasoline and lubricants were seized along with 45 tons of ammunition.

German losses at Kasserine were 201 killed, 536 wounded and 252 missing, totalling 989 casualties. In materiel, Germans lost 20 tanks, 67 vehicles and 14 guns. Allied forces captured 73 German and 535 Italian soldiers.

=== Rommel ===
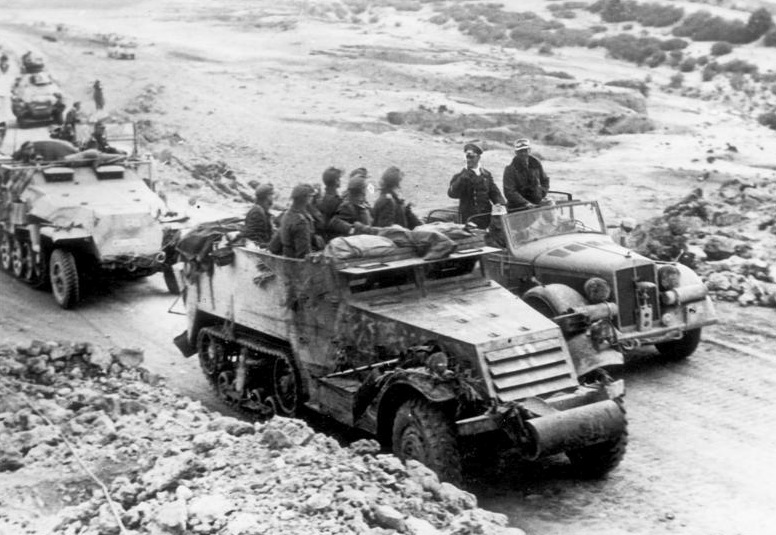
Rommel in Tunisia speaking with troops riding a captured American-built M3 half-track

Rommel had hoped to take advantage of the inexperience of the new Allied commanders but was opposed by von Arnim who, wanting to conserve strength in his sector, ignored Kesselring's orders and withheld the attached heavy tank unit of 10th Panzer. Rommel felt that most U.S. units and commanders had shown their inexperience, losing sight of the broader picture. Rommel was later impressed with how quickly U.S. commanders came to understand and implement mobile warfare and also praised U.S. equipment: "British experience has been put to good use in American equipment". Of particular interest to the Germans was the sturdy M3 armored half-track, and for some time after the battle, German units deployed large numbers of captured U.S. vehicles.

The Allies studied the results equally seriously. Positioned by senior commanders who had not personally reconnoitered the ground, U.S. forces were often located too far from each other for mutual support. It was also noted that U.S. soldiers tended to become careless about digging in, exposing their positions, bunching in groups when in open view of enemy artillery observers, and positioning units on topographic crests, where their silhouettes made them perfect targets. Too many soldiers, exasperated by the rocky soil of Tunisia, were still digging shallow slit trenches instead of deep foxholes.

The 1st Armored Division was on the receiving end of German anti-tank and screening tactics and had not learned about those tactics from experienced British armored units. Others in the U.S. Army were well aware of the German deception tactics. The Allies were also unable to prevent the Germans from attaining air superiority over the battlefield, limiting effective Allied air reconnaissance and allowing relentless German bombing and strafing attacks that disrupted Allied attempts at deployment and organization. Attacks by the Luftwaffe in close support of German ground offensives often neutralized U.S. attempts to organize effective defensive artillery fire.

=== Eisenhower ===
General Dwight D. Eisenhower began restructuring the Allied command, creating the 18th Army Group, commanded by General Sir Harold R. L. G. Alexander, to tighten the operational control of the three Allied nations involved and improve their coordination. Major General Lloyd Fredendall was relieved by Eisenhower and sent to the U.S. to lead the Central Defense Command, responsible for forces in the midwestern states. Training programs at home had contributed to U.S. Army units in North Africa being saddled with disgraced commanders who had failed in battle and were reluctant to advocate radical changes. Eisenhower found through Major General Omar Bradley and others, that Fredendall's subordinates had lost confidence in him and Alexander told U.S. commanders, "I'm sure you must have better men than that". Major General Ernest N. Harmon called Fredendall both a moral and physical coward and later said he was "a son of a bitch".

Fredendall took the blame but Anderson, the First Army commander, was judged to be at fault for the failure to concentrate Allied armored units and keep forces concentrated, that later disintegrated into individual units. When Fredendall disclaimed all responsibility for the poorly equipped French XIX Corps and denied French requests for support, notably when under pressure at Faïd, Anderson allowed the request to go unfulfilled. Anderson was also blamed for dispersing the three combat commands of the U.S. 1st Armored Division, despite the objections of Major General Orlando Ward, the divisional commander. (Note: Harmon reported that Ward was "hopping mad" at Anderson for dispersing his division and at Fredendall for allowing it.) U.S. Brigadier General Irwin later became commander of the 5th Infantry Division in Europe and went on to higher command, as did British Brigadier Nicholson, who later commanded the 2nd Infantry Division in India. Allied commanders were given greater scope for initiative and to keep forces concentrated. They were also urged to lead their units from the front and to keep command posts well forward, unlike Fredendall who had rarely visited the front line. (Ward was sent home, where he trained troops and then commanded the 20th Armored Division in Europe.)

On 6 March, Major General George Patton was temporarily removed from planning for the Allied invasion of Sicily to command the II Corps. Bradley was appointed assistant corps commander and moved up to command of II Corps when Patton returned to planning for Sicily. Fredendall was reassigned to the United States and several other commanders were removed or promoted out of the way. Patton was not known for hesitancy and did not bother to request permission when taking action to support his command or other units requesting assistance. During the advance from Gafsa, Alexander, the 18th Army Group commander, had given detailed orders to Patton, afterwards changing II Corps' mission several times. Once beyond Maknassy, Alexander again gave orders Patton considered excessively detailed. From then on, Patton simply ignored those parts of mission orders he considered ill-advised on grounds of military expediency and/or a rapidly evolving tactical situation.

Efforts were made to improve the integration of immediate artillery and air support, which had been poorly coordinated; in one division, 95 percent of air attacks were concentrated on its artillery. While U.S. artillery response times improved dramatically, coordinating close air support was not achieved until Operation Overlord over a year later. American anti-aircraft artillery began reforms, having learned that, while Stuka dive bombers were vulnerable to .50 BMG rounds fired from vehicles, field units needed dedicated autocannons to protect them from aerial attack.

== See also ==
- List of equipment of the United States Army during World War II
- List of British military equipment of World War II
- List of French military equipment of World War II
- List of German military equipment of World War II
- List of Italian Army equipment in World War II
- List of World War II battles
- North African campaign timeline
- Panzer Army Africa
