= Alaska Defense Command =

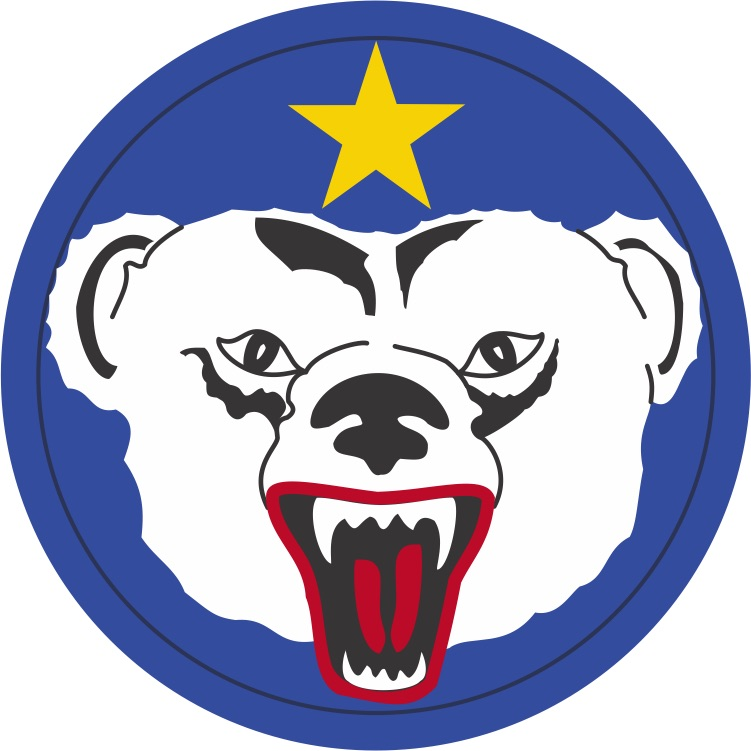
- Alaska Defense Command Second SSI 24 March 1943 - 31 December 1943
- Active: 1941–1943
- Country: United States of America
- Branch: Army
- Role: Home defense & training
- Headquarters: Fort Richardson, Anchorage
- Engagements: Aleutian Islands Campaign

Commanders
- Commanding General: Simon Bolivar Buckner, Jr.

The Alaska Defense Command (ADC) was a military formation of the United States Army. It was established on 4 February 1941, responsible for coordinating the defense of the Alaska Territory of the United States. The first commanding general of ADC was Brigadier General Simon Bolivar Buckner, Jr. The Air Force, Alaska Defense Command, was replaced by the Alaskan Air Force which was activated on 15 January 1942.

Until 1 November 1943, Alaska Defense Command was under the jurisdiction of the Western Defense Command, headquartered at the Presidio of San Francisco. ADC was dissolved on 31 October 1943 and replaced by the Alaskan Department, still commanded by now Lieutenant General Buckner but now reporting directly back to the War Department in Washington, D.C.

The Alaskan Department became United States Army Alaska on 15 December 1947.

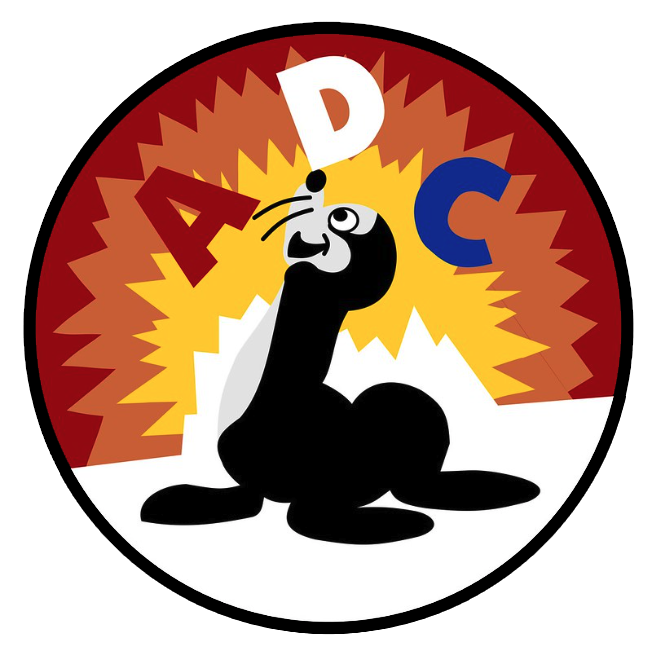
Alaska Defense Command Red Variant SSI prior to March 1943

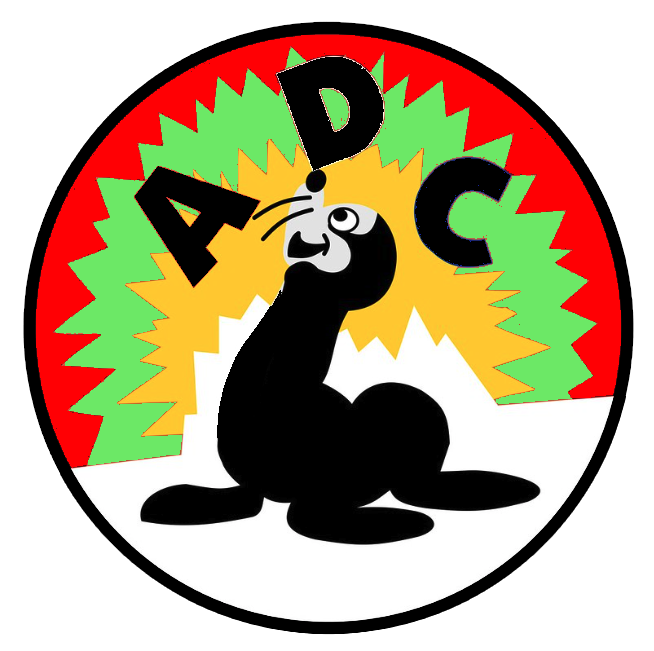
Alaska Defense Command Green Variant SSI prior to March 1943

== Organization ==
Organization of the command in 1941 (just before Pearl Harbor) was as follows:

- Alaska Defense Command, Fort Richardson
  - United States Army Finance Office, Anchorage
  - Alaskan Defense Command Signals Detachment, Chilkoot Barracks
  - B Company, 194th Tank Battalion
  - 4th Infantry Regiment (1 company at Ladd Field)
  - 37th Infantry Regiment, Fort Greely (1 Battalion at Fort Mears and 1 Company at Fort Raymond
  - 153rd Infantry Regiment, Fort Raymond (1 Company at Annette Island Airport, 1 Company in Nome, 1 Company at Yakutat Air Base
  - 201st Infantry Regiment, Fort Greely (1 Battalion at Fort Ray)
  - 1st Battalion, 297th Infantry Regiment, (A and B Companies at Chilkoot Barracks)
  - 81st Medium Field Artillery Regiment
  - 98th Field Artillery Regiment, Fort Greely
  - 250th Coast Artillery (Mobile), Fort Mears (two companies at Fort Raymond and one battalion at Fort Richardson)
  - United States Army Junior Mine Planter, Chilkoot Barracks
  - 75th Coast Artillery Regiment (Antiaircraft)
  - 215th Coast Artillery Regiment (Antiaircraft), Fort Greely
  - 1st Battalion, 205th Coast Artillery Regiment (Antiaircraft)
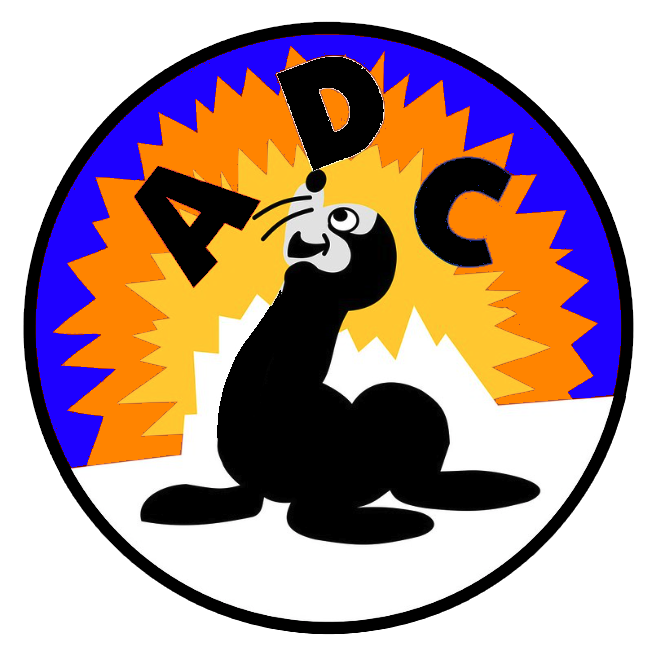
  - Alaska Defense Command Blue Variant SSI prior to March 1943
    1st Battalion, 206th Coast Artillery Regiment (Antiaircraft)
  - 1st Battalion, 151st Engineer Regiment (Combat), Fort Greely (1 Batteries at Fort Mears, 2 Companies at Fort Raymond, 1 Platoon at Ladd Field)
  - 32nd Engineer Company
  - Company from the 23rd Quartermasters Regiment (Truck)
  - Alaskan Defense Command Quartermaster Depot, Chilkoot Barracks
  - 4th Ordnance Company (Medium Maintenance)
  - A Company, 69th Quartermaster Battalion (Light Maintenance), Fort Greely (Detachment at Fort Richardson)
  - x7 Station Complements at each fort
- Air Force, Alaska Defense Command, Elmendorf Field under lieutenant colonel E S Davis
  - Alaskan Air Warning Signals Company, Fort Richardson
  - 408th Aviation Signal Company
  - 430th Aviation Maintenance Signal Company
  - 14th Aviation Service Signal Company (Split between each base)
  - 802nd Aviation Engineer Battalion, Annette Island Landing Field
  - 807th Aviation Engineer Company, Yakutat Air Base
  - 10th Aviation Service Maintenance Company (Split between each base)
  - 28th Composite Group
    - Headquarters and Headquarters Squadron, Elmendorf Field under Major N D Sillin
    - 18th Fighter Squadron
    - 73rd Medium Bomber Squadron
    - 36th Heavy Bomber Squadron
    - Tow Target Flight
    - 699th Aviation Composite Ordnance Maintenance Company (Elements at Ladd Field)
    - Air Corps Cold Weather Detachment, Ladd Field
      - Air Corps Cold Weather Headquarters Flight
      - Air Corps Heavy Bombardment Flight
      - Air Corps Medium Bombardment Flight
      - Air Corps Pursuit Flight

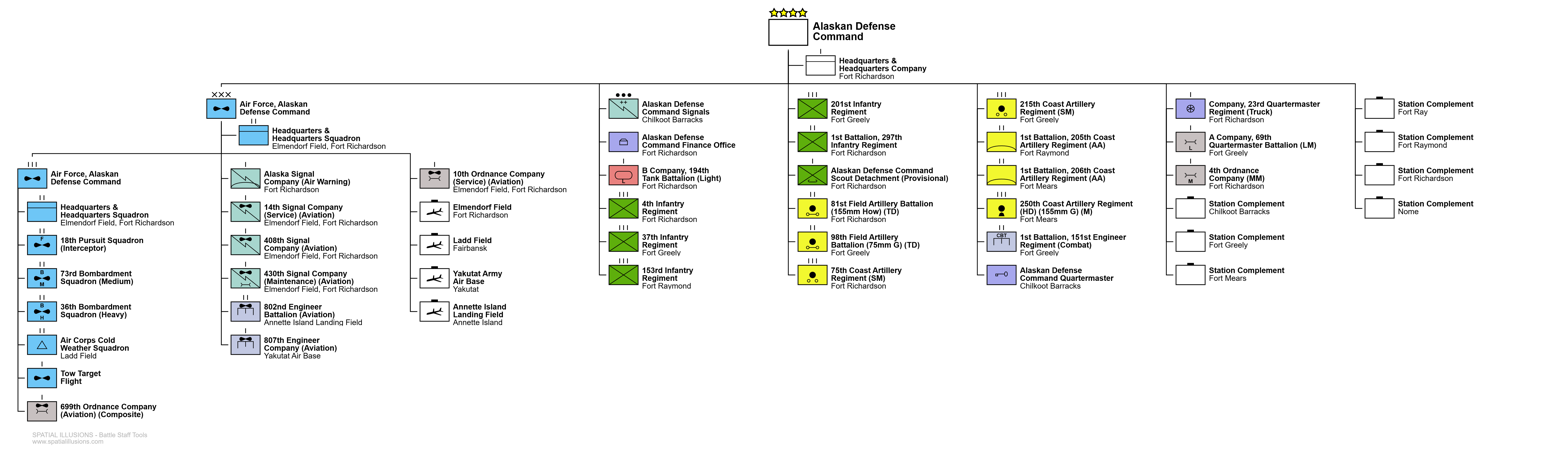
Graphic of Alaskan Defence Command in 1941.

== See also ==
- Western Defense Command
- Eastern Defense Command
- Central Defense Command
- Southern Defense Command
- Caribbean Defense Command
- Newfoundland Base Command
- Greenland Base Command
- Bermuda Base Command
- Caribbean Defense Command
- Northwest Service Command
- Icelandic Base Command
