= Joseph A. Green (general) =

United States Army officer

Joseph Andrew Green
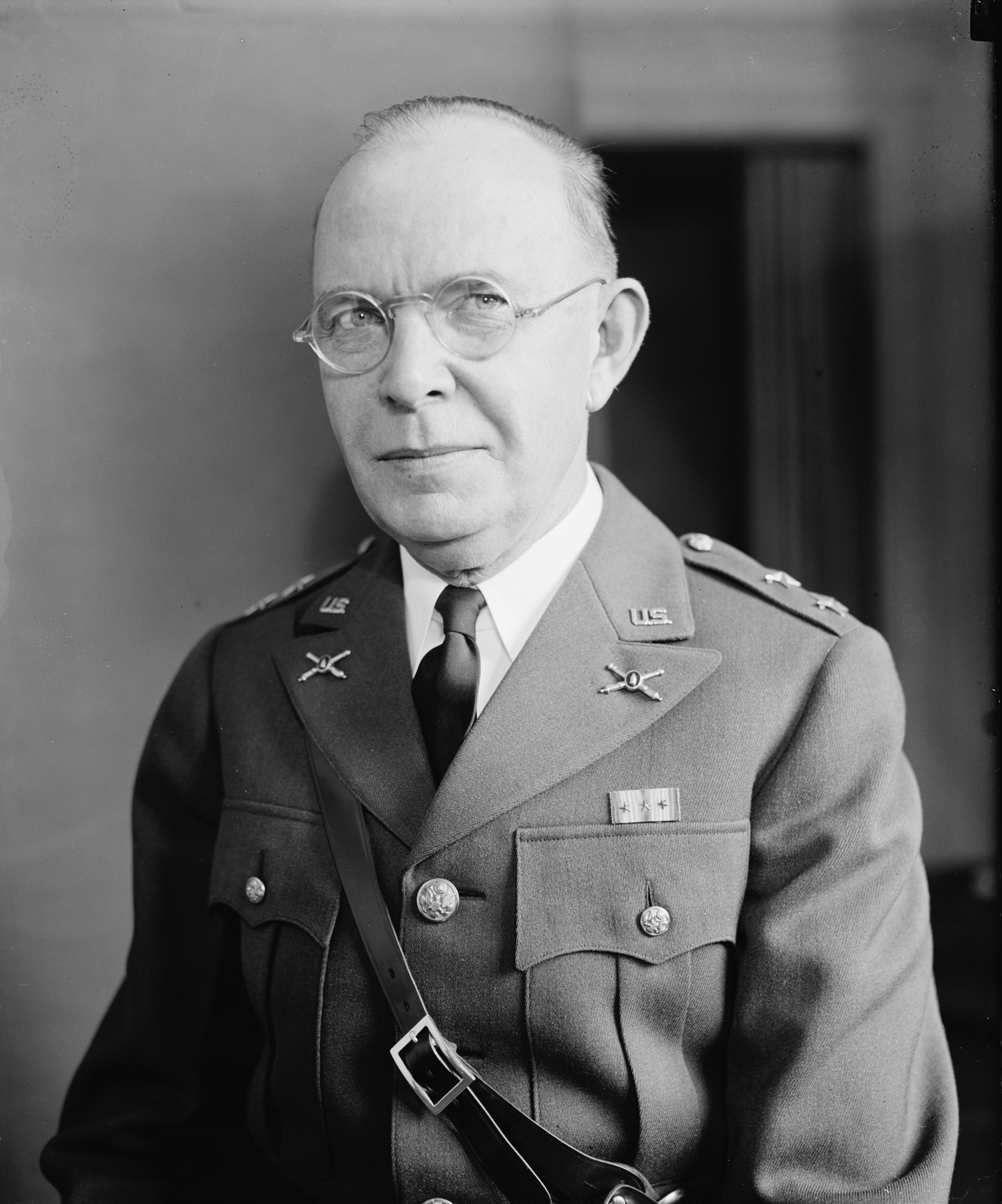
- Born: January 14, 1881; Cherokee, Iowa, U.S.
- Died: October 27, 1963 (aged 82); San Antonio, Texas, U.S.
- Military career
- Allegiance: United States
- Branch: United States Army
- Service years: 1906–1946
- Rank: Major general
- Service number: 0-2129
- Commands: 61st Coast Artillery Regiment; United States Army Coast Artillery Corps; United States Army Antiaircraft Command
- Conflicts: World War I; World War II

Joseph Andrew Green (January 14, 1881 – October 27, 1963) was a United States Army officer with the rank of major general, who is most noted as a Chief of the Coast Artillery Corps during the years 1940–1942.

== Biography ==
Green was born on January 14, 1881, in Cherokee, Iowa. He graduated from the United States Military Academy at West Point in 1906. During World War I, Green served with the American Expeditionary Forces in France.

Green served at the War Department General Staff from 1927 until 1931. He was promoted to Lt. Colonel in 1929. In 1931 was appointed Commanding Officer of the 61st Coast Artillery Regiment and promoted to Colonel in 1935. In 1937, Green was appointed as Executive Officer to the Chief of Coast Artillery and served in this capacity until 1940, when he succeeded Archibald H. Sunderland as the Chief of Coast Artillery.

In 1942, position of Chief of Coast Artillery was abolished and Green was appointed Commanding General of the newly created Antiaircraft Command. He held this command until 1945. He retired from the Army in 1946.

Major General Joseph Andrew Green died on October 27, 1963, and is buried at Fort Sam Houston National Cemetery.

== Decorations ==
Major General Joseph A. Green received these awards during the span of his military career:

1st Row	Distinguished Service Medal		
2nd Row	Legion of Merit	World War I Victory Medal with three battle clasps	American Defense Service Medal
3rd Row	American Campaign Medal	European-African-Middle Eastern Campaign Medal w/ one service star	World War II Victory Medal

== See also ==
- U.S. Army Coast Artillery Corps
- Seacoast defense in the United States
- Harbor Defenses of Manila and Subic Bays
