= Herbert J. Brees =

United States Army general (1877–1958)

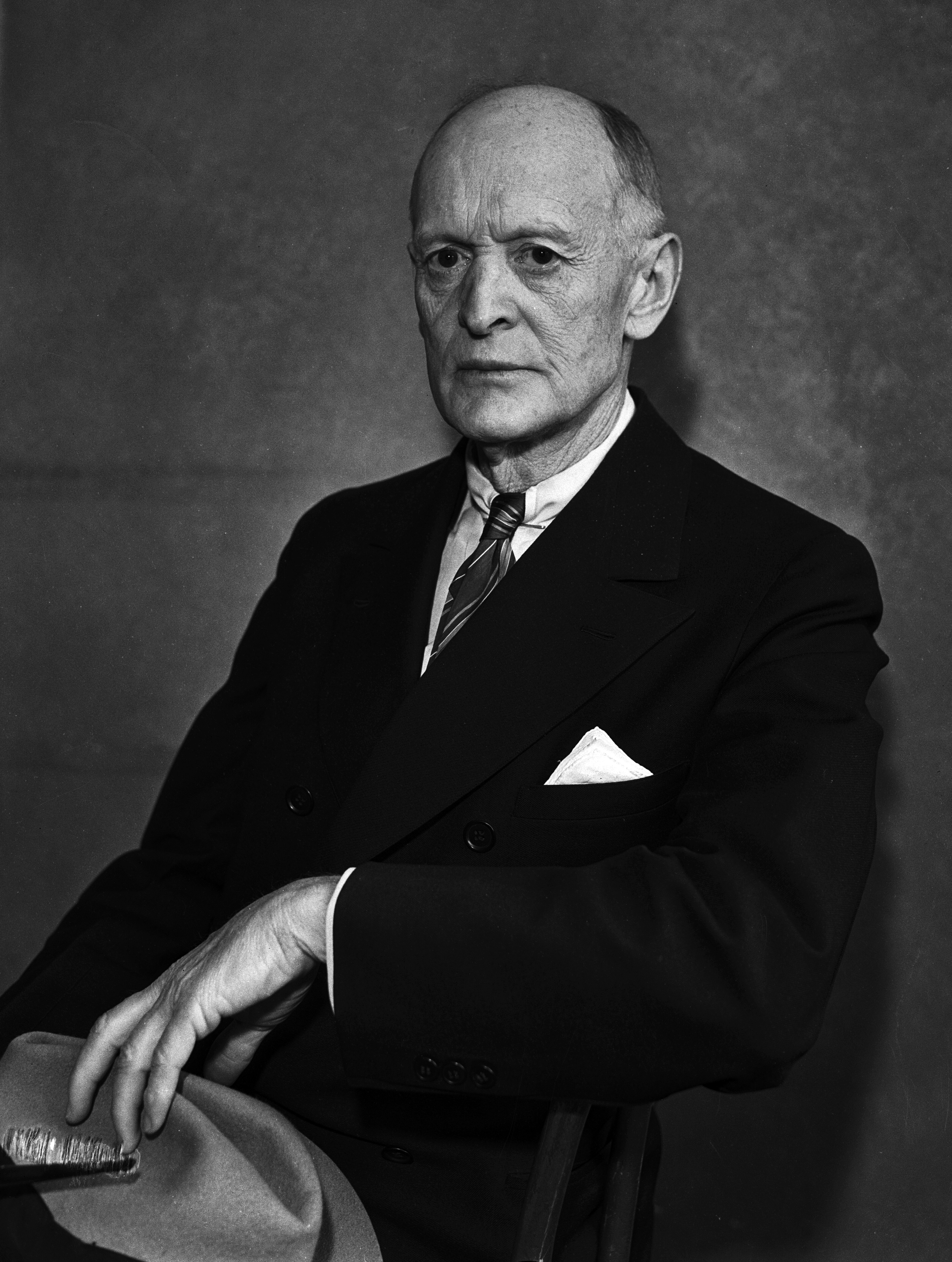
- Born: June 12, 1877; Laramie, Wyoming
- Died: December 22, 1958 (aged 81); San Antonio, Texas, U.S.
- Burial place: Fort Sam Houston National Cemetery
- Military career
- Allegiance: United States
- Branch: United States Army
- Service years: 1898–1941
- Rank: Lieutenant General
- Commands: VII Corps; 11th Cavalry; United States Army Command and General Staff College; 2nd Division; VIII Corps; Third United States Army
- Conflicts: Spanish–American War; Philippine–American War; World War I World War II
- Awards: Army Distinguished Service Medal; Silver Star (2); Legion of Honor (France)

Herbert Jay Brees (June 12, 1877 – December 22, 1958) was a lieutenant general in the United States Army.

== Early military career ==
Brees was born in Laramie, Wyoming on June 12, 1877. He graduated from the University of Wyoming with a Bachelor of Science in 1897 and returned to receive an honorary LL.D. in June 1939. Brees was the captain of the Wyoming Cowboys football team for three seasons, from 1894 to 1896.

Brees was appointed a first lieutenant, 2nd United States Volunteer Cavalry, on May 27, 1898, served at Fort D.A. Russell (later Fort Francis E. Warren, later Francis E. Warren Air Force Base), Wyoming. On June 22, 1898, he was transferred with his regiment to Panama Park, Florida. He was discharged from the United States Volunteers on July 28, 1898, in order to accept an appointment as a second lieutenant in the Regular Army.

== Spanish–American War ==
Brees served with the 2nd Artillery at Tampa, Florida until August 4, 1898, when he accompanied Battery K of that regiment to Fort Constitution, New Hampshire, commanding it until 24 November 1898. He was transferred to the 4th Artillery at that same station and commanded Battery M.

On April 14, 1899, Brees joined Troop G, 9th Cavalry Regiment at Fort Apache, Arizona until he and the 9th Cavalry was ordered to the Philippine Islands during the Philippine–American War.

== Inter-war years (pre–World War I) ==
Brees returned to the United States on October 1, 1901, where he joined the 12th Cavalry at Fort Sam Houston, Texas. On June 5, 1902, he departed for the General Service and Staff College at Fort Leavenworth, Kansas. He graduated as an honor graduate on 24 June 1903.

After the war Brees attended the Infantry and Cavalry School, completing the course in 1903 as its Honor Graduate. He went on to complete the Staff Officer College in 1905 and the United States Army War College in 1907. He then served with the Signal Corps at Fort Myer, Virginia, until December 18, 1903. His next assignment was in the Office of the Chief Signal Officer in Washington, D.C.

On February 24, 1904, Brees was assigned to Company G, Signal Corps, at Fort Hood, New York. He was promoted to captain on 30 November 1904, and attended the United States Army Command and General Staff College at Fort Leavenworth until July 1, 1905. Brees next commanded Troop M, 1st Cavalry, at Fort Sam Houston and Fort Clark, Texas, until July 2, 1906. He was Chief Signal Officer, Maneuver Camp of Instruction, Austin, Texas, until 6 September 1906. Then he returned to duty with Troop M, 1st Cavalry, at Fort Clark.

Brees attended the Army War College, Washington, D.C., from October 1906 until November 1907. After graduation, he rejoined Troop M, 1st Cavalry, in San Francisco and sailed with it to the Philippine Islands on December 5, 1907. Arriving in the Philippines on January 7, 1908, Brees served at Camp Stotsenburg. He returned to the United States by way of Europe on June 5, 1910, and served at Fort Ethan Allen, Vermont, in connection with the selection of a cavalry rifle team, until July 19, 1910. Brees then rejoined Troop M, 1st Cavalry, at the Presidio of San Francisco, and served with it at that station until 27 September 1910, and at Fort Duchesne, Utah, until December 3, 1911. Part of the time, from November 5, 1910, until December 3, 1911, he was Acting Indian Agent, Uintah and Omay Agencies.

From December 1911 until September 1914, Brees served as Aide to Major General Arthur Murray, Headquarters Western Division, San Francisco, California. He was again ordered to the Philippine Islands in October, 1914, and served with the 7th and 9th Cavalry at Camp Stotsenburg. Returning to the United States in October 1916, he served on border duty at Glenn Springs, Texas, until 16 April 1917.

== World War I ==
On August 26, 1917, Brees became Chief of Staff of the 91st Division at Camp Lewis, Washington. While serving in this assignment he was promoted to the temporary rank of colonel on 16 February 1918. It was during this time that he went to France on a tour of observation and later accompanied the division to Camp Merritt, New Jersey.

Brees and the 91st Division sailed for France on June 28, 1918. From October 22, 1918, until June 14, 1919, he served as Chief of Staff, VII Army Corps, American Expeditionary Force, and American Forces in Germany. During part of that time, from October 27, 1918, to November 20, 1918, he was acting commander of the VII Army Corps.

Brees' decorations during World War I Included the Army Distinguished Service Medal, the Silver Star, and the French Legion of Honor. The citation for his Army DSM reads:

The President of the United States of America, authorized by Act of Congress, July 9, 1918, takes pleasure in presenting the Army Distinguished Service Medal to Colonel (General Staff) Herbert J. Brees, United States Army, for exceptionally meritorious and distinguished services to the Government of the United States, in a duty of great responsibility during World War I. General Brees served with distinction as Chief of Staff of the 91st Division throughout its training period and during the greater part of its active operations. His marked administrative ability was reflected in the successes of this division during the first phases of the Meuse-Argonne operations. Later, as Chief of Staff of the VII Army Corps, he rendered invaluable services in perfecting the necessary organization for the march into the German territory, overcoming grave difficulties in securing supplies and equipment.

The citation for one of his two Silver Stars reads:

By direction of the President, under the provisions of the act of Congress approved July 9, 1918 (Bul. No. 43, W.D., 1918), Colonel (Cavalry) Herbert Jay Brees, United States Army, is cited for gallantry in action and a silver star may be placed upon the ribbon of the Victory Medals awarded him. Colonel Brees distinguished himself by gallantry in action while serving with the General Staff, 91st Division, in action near Very, France, 27–28 September 1918. While serving as Chief of Staff, 91st Division, he personally visited the extreme front lines under intense artillery, rifle, and machine gun fire to confer with unit commanders. By this action and the disregard of personal danger, he was a great source of inspiration to the entire command.

== Interbellum ==
After a brief stint as Range Officer, Inter-Allied Rifle and Pistol Competition, Belgian Camp, Le Mans, France, Brees returned to the United States on July 6, 1919. He next served as an instructor in the Army Service Schools at Fort Leavenworth. While there, he reverted to his permanent grade of lieutenant colonel on August 3, 1919.

On 31 December 1919 Brees became Director of the School of the Line and was promoted to colonel in the Regular Army on July 1, 1920. On June 30, 1922, he became Director of the Command and General Staff School, and served in that capacity until July 24, 1923. Brees took command of the 11th Cavalry and post, Presidio of Monterey, California, on 12 September 1923, on which duty he served until June 10, 1925. He was then assigned to duty as Assistant Commandant, General Service Schools, Fort Leavenworth, until June 29, 1929. He was Corps Area Inspector, Ninth Corps Area, with headquarters at San Francisco, to February 24, 1930, when he was assigned to duty as Assistant Commandant, Army War College, serving in that capacity until October 29, 1930.

On November 1, 1930, Brees was promoted to brigadier general. After taking short courses at the Field Artillery School, Fort Sill, Oklahoma, and at the Air Corps Tactical School, Langley Field, Virginia, he took command of the 13th Field Artillery Brigade Post and 87th Division Organization Reserves at Fort Bragg, North Carolina.

Brees was ordered to the Philippines in May 1931, where he commanded Fort Stotsenburg until June 15, 1934. Upon his return to the United States he took command of the 2nd Field Artillery Brigade at Fort Sam Houston, Texas. On February 4, 1934, he became Commandant of the Command and General Staff School at Fort Leavenworth and also was in charge of the Missouri District of the CCC. He was promoted to Major General on June 1, 1936.

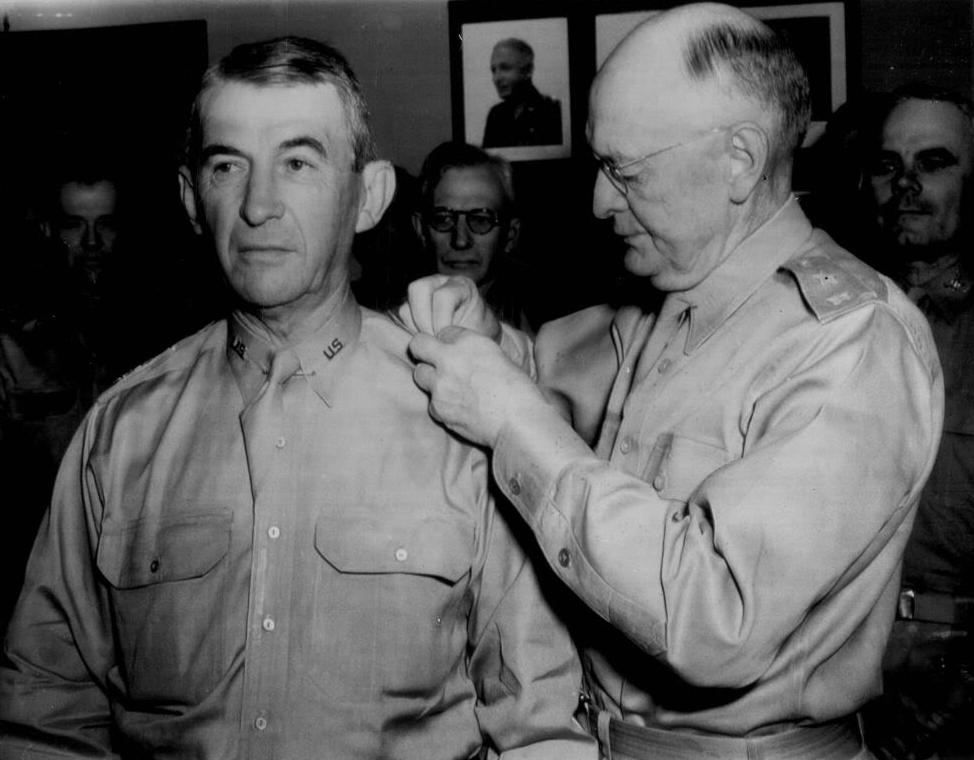
Lieutenant General Herbert J. Brees (right) pins the third star on his successor in command of the Third Army, Lieutenant General Walter Krueger (left), on May 17, 1941, in San Antonio, Texas.

Brees assumed command of the 2nd Division at Fort Sam Houston on July 2, 1936, and on October 1, he became Commanding General, Eighth Corps Area. From June to October, 1936 he commanded the 2nd Infantry Division. He was succeeded by James K. Parsons, and served until 1938 as commander of VIII Corps. During Brees' tenure at VIII Corps, the family of General John J. Pershing asked him to be present during Pershing's final illness in Tucson, Arizona, so that he could plan for the transportation of Pershing's remains to Washington, D.C. for his funeral. Pershing recovered, however, and did not die until July 15, 1948, in Washington, D.C.

Brees commanded the Third United States Army as a lieutenant general from October 1940 until he reached mandatory retirement age in May 1941. From March 17, 1941, until retirement, he was also the commander of Southern Defense Command. In 1940, Brees served as Chief Controller for the U.S. military's large-scale training maneuvers in Louisiana, and played an important role in the changing the tactics and strategy used in Europe during World War II by showing that the tendency of mechanized units to use road networks during maneuver made them vulnerable to blitzkrieg style attacks by an enemy that left the roads and used the terrain to its advantage.

== Post-military ==
After the war Brees served as President of the National Bank of Fort Sam Houston.

Brees died in San Antonio, Texas, on December 22, 1958. He was buried in Section B, Site 241-A at Fort Sam Houston National Cemetery.

== Awards ==
- Army Distinguished Service Medal
- Silver Star with Oak Leaf Cluster
- Spanish War Service Medal
- Philippine Campaign Medal
- Victory Medal
- Army of Occupation of Germany Medal
- American Defense Service Medal
- Legion of Honor (France)

== Other ==
Laramie, Wyoming's Regional Airport was built in 1934 and originally named Brees Field in his honor. During World War II Brees Field was the destination for B-24 bombers that brought crews to the University of Wyoming recreation camp in the Snowy Range for rest and recuperation.

== Sources ==
- The University Melange, magazine of the University of Wyoming, volume V, no. 5, April, 1908, page 218
- "Lieutenants Are Placed: Some of the Officers Who Were Appointed from Civil Life Are Detailed for Duty," New York Times, August 25, 1898
- Annual Reports of War Department for the Fiscal Year Ending June 30, 1901, Volume 1, Part 5, page 324
- "Army Orders and Assignments," New York Times, October 6, 1910
- "Sword, Bayonet, Sabre and Belt: Army and Navy News of the Week," Los Angeles Times, June 15, 1913
- "Army Orders and Assignments," New York Times, June 5, 1917
- The Ninety-First: The First at Camp Lewis, Alice Palmer Henderson, 1918, pages 93 to 94
- The Story of the 91st Division, published by 91st Division Publication Committee, 1919, page 113
- 11th Armored Cavalry Regiment web page, Commanders of the 11th Cavalry Regiment, http://www.blackhorsetroopers.org/history.htm
- Annual Report of the General Service Schools, 1925–1926 and 1926–1927
- United States Army Center of Military History, 2nd Infantry Division Commanders, http://www.blackhorsetroopers.org/history.htm
- U.S. Army Combined Arms Center web site, Command and General Staff College Commandants page,
- "Army Promotion List is Sent to Senate: Generals Nominated," Chicago Daily Tribune, January 31, 1936
- "Camp Commander Arrives," New York Times, February 26, 1938
- "Record Promotions Made to Fill High Posts of Army: President Increases Generalships to 187 With 85 New Positions Created," Los Angeles Times, September 28, 1940
- An Uncertain Trumpet: the Evolution of U.S. Army Infantry Doctrine, 1919–1941, Kenneth Finlayson, 2001, page 136 to 139
- "Relieve Gen. Brees, Soon to Retire, of 3D Army Command," Chicago Daily Tribune, May 9, 1941
- Hanging Sam: a Military Biography of General Samuel T. Williams, Harold J. Meyer, 1990, page 137
- Texas Death Index, 1903–2000, Name: Herbert Jay Brees; Death Date: 22 Dec 1958; Death County: Bexar; Certificate: 66110
- National Cemetery Administration. U.S. Veterans Gravesites, ca. 1775–2006
- Laramie Regional Airport web site, https://web.archive.org/web/20070927192224/http://www.laramieairport.com/About.html
- Military Times, Hall of Valor, Distinguished Service Medal citation, http://valor.militarytimes.com/recipient.php?recipientid=17298
- ARCENT (US 3rd Army) Command Biographies LTG Brees Command BIO

Military offices
Preceded by Stanley D. Embick	Commanding General of the Third United States Army; 1 October 1940 – 15 May 1941	Succeeded by Walter Krueger
