= Lloyd Fredendall =

American general during World War II (1883–1963)

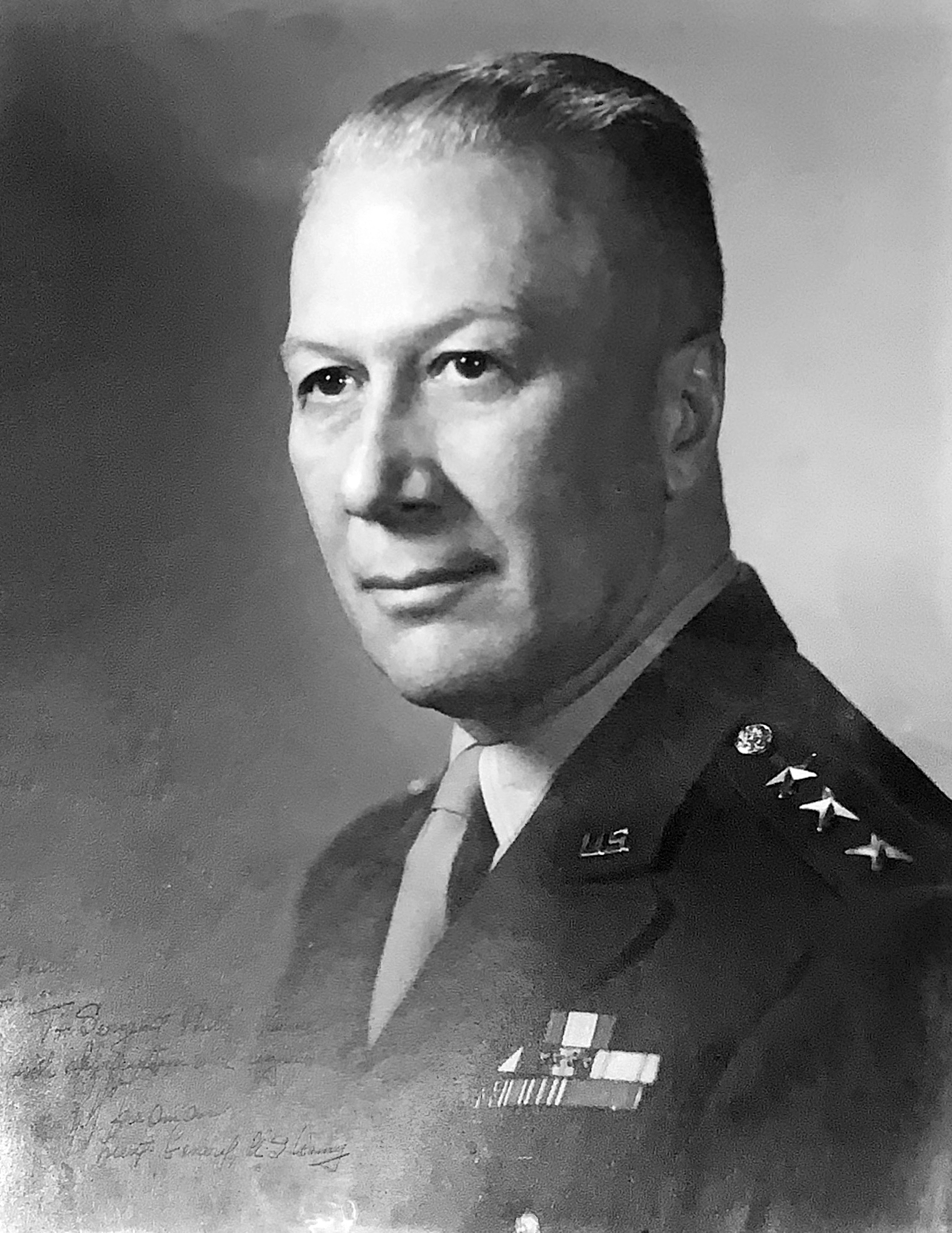
- Fredendall as Lieutenant General
- Born: December 28, 1883; Cheyenne, Wyoming Territory, U.S.
- Died: October 4, 1963 (aged 79); San Diego, California, U.S.
- Burial place: Fort Rosecrans National Cemetery
- Spouse: Crystal Daphne Chant (m. 1909)
- Children: 2
- Military career
- Allegiance: United States
- Branch: United States Army
- Service years: 1907–1946
- Rank: Lieutenant general
- Service number: 0-2197
- Unit: Infantry Branch
- Commands: 57th Infantry Regiment; 4th Infantry Division; XI Corps; II Corps; Second Army; Central Defense Command
- Conflicts: Philippine–American War; World War I; World War II; North African Campaign
- Awards: Army Distinguished Service Medal; Philippine Campaign Medal; Mexican Border Service Medal; World War I Victory Medal; American Defense Service Medal; American Campaign Medal; European–African–Middle Eastern Campaign Medal; World War II Victory Medal

Lieutenant General Lloyd Ralston Fredendall (December 28, 1883 – October 4, 1963) was a general officer of the United States Army who served during World War II. He is best known for his leadership failure during the Battle of Kasserine Pass, leading to one of America's worst defeats of World War II, for which he was relieved of his command.

He was in command of the Central Task Force landings during Operation Torch in North Africa, and led II Corps during the early stages of the Tunisian Campaign.

In February 1943, as a major general in command of the II Corps, his forces were defeated by German forces commanded by Field Marshal Erwin Rommel and General Hans-Jürgen von Arnim in the Battle of Kasserine Pass. After this debacle, Fredendall was relieved of command of II Corps by General Dwight D. Eisenhower, the Supreme Allied Commander in North Africa, and replaced by Major General George S. Patton.

In spite of being relieved of command, Fredendall was promoted to lieutenant general in June 1943, assumed command of Second Army and was greeted in the United States as a hero.

== Early life and military career ==
Lloyd Ralston Fredendall was born on December 28, 1883, at Fort D. A. Russell near Cheyenne, Wyoming. His father, Ira Livingston Fredendall (December 7, 1846 – February 6, 1935), was on active duty in the United States Army when Fredendall was born. Ira became sheriff of Laramie County before receiving a commission in the Quartermaster Corps during the Spanish–American War. The elder Fredendall retired as a major in 1914, returned to active duty during World War I to supervise construction at several bases in the western United States, and retired again as a lieutenant colonel.

As a result of his father's connections in the service and with local and state politicians, Fredendall secured an appointment from Wyoming Senator Francis E. Warren to enter the class of 1905 at the United States Military Academy (USMA). Described by a classmate as "a very soldierly little fellow, but extremely goaty in mathematics," Fredendall performed poorly in math as well as in general deportment, and was dismissed after just one semester. (Note: For West Point underclassmen, the "goats" are those ranked in the bottom half of the class. For seniors, the "goat" is the cadet ranked last in the graduating class.)

His mother persuaded Senator Warren to re-appoint Fredendall the next year, but he dropped out again. Although the senator was willing to nominate him for a third attempt, the academy declined to readmit him. Instead, Fredendall attended the Massachusetts Institute of Technology from 1903 to 1904 as a member of the class of 1907. He took the officer's qualifying exam in 1906, and scored first out of 70 applicants. On February 13, 1907, he received his commission in the United States Army as a second lieutenant in the Infantry Branch.

After service in the Philippines and other overseas and stateside assignments, Fredendall shipped out to the Western Front with the 28th Infantry Regiment in August 1917, four months after the American entry into World War I. He held a succession of instructor assignments in the army's schools in France, and commanded one of its training centers. He built a record as an excellent teacher, trainer, and administrator, and ended the war as a temporary lieutenant colonel.

== Between the wars ==
The Armistice of November 11, 1918, saw Fredendall assigned, like many other officers, to a variety of staff and training duties. He was both student and instructor at the U.S. Army Infantry School; was a 1923 distinguished graduate (placing 31 out of 151) of the U.S. Army Command and General Staff School; and in 1925, he graduated from the U.S. Army War College. He also completed tours of duty in Washington at the Statistics Branch, the Inspector General's Department (September 1934 to March 1936) and as executive officer (XO), Office of the Chief of Infantry. These postings led to important contacts that later furthered his military career.

In December 1939, during World War II (although the United States was still neutral at this stage), Fredendall was promoted to the one-star rank of brigadier general, serving with the 5th Infantry Division. In October 1940, he was promoted to the two-star rank of major general, and given command of the 4th Infantry Division until July 1941.

== World War II ==
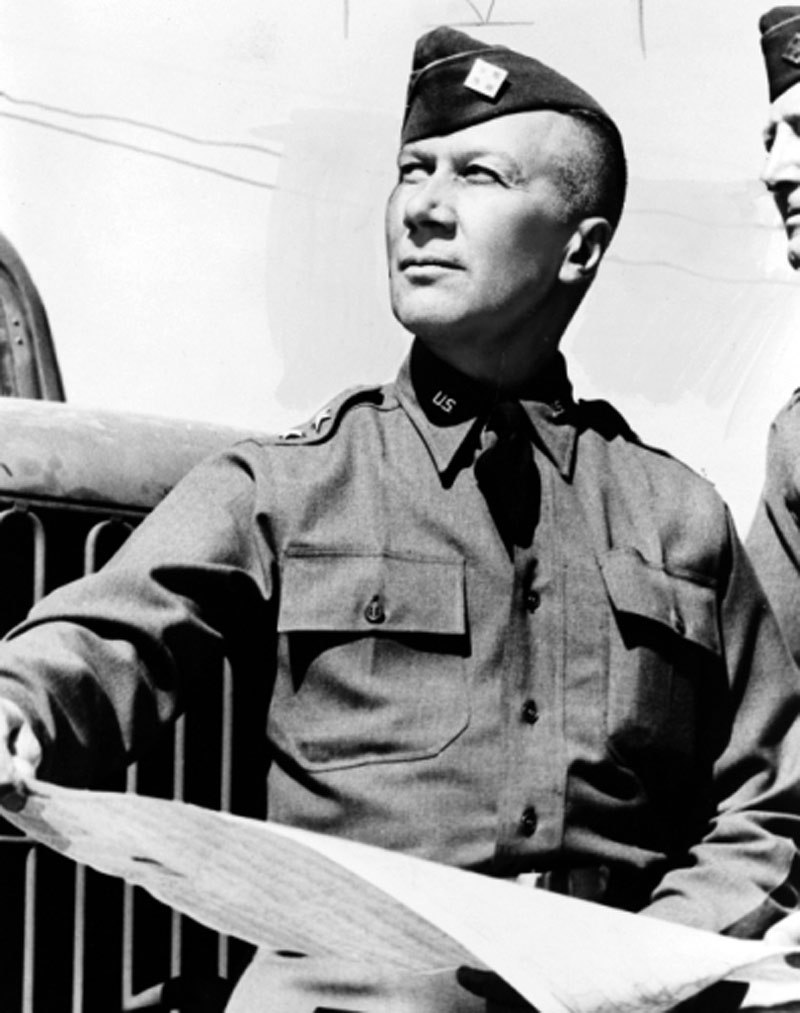
Fredendall in 1941, as commander of the 4th Infantry Division

Fredendall's rise to military command in World War II was facilitated by General George Marshall, the U.S. Army Chief of Staff; and Lieutenant General Lesley J. McNair, the commander of Army Ground Forces, a friend and colleague. McNair had included Fredendall on a list of the top three generals he believed capable of commanding all U.S. Army forces being sent to Britain. Marshall, in turn, had recommended the swaggering Fredendall to Lieutenant General Dwight D. Eisenhower for a major command in the Allied invasion of North Africa, codenamed Operation Torch.

General Marshall was especially fond of the youthful-looking, cocky Fredendall, describing him as "one of the best" and remarking in a staff meeting when his name was mentioned, "I like that man; you can see determination all over his face." Fredendall himself was convinced that neither Eisenhower nor his deputy, Major General Mark W. Clark, wanted him in Africa since he was above both in pre-war rank. However, with such glowing testimonials from senior commanders, Eisenhower chose Fredendall to command the 39,000-man Central Task Force (the largest of three) in Operation Torch. Eisenhower cabled Marshall on November 12, 1942, four days after the invasion, "I bless the day you urged Fredendall upon me and cheerfully acknowledge that my earlier doubts of him were completely unfounded." Eisenhower, in notes dictated to Harry C. Butcher on December 12, 1942, said, "…Patton I think comes closest to meeting every requirement made on a commander. Just after him I would, at present, rate Fredendall, although I do not believe the latter has the imagination in foreseeing and preparing for possible jobs of the future that Patton possesses." Eisenhower later came to regret both this assessment and his selection of Fredendall for the command.

Fredendall was described by General Lucian Truscott as:

Small in stature, loud and rough in speech, he was outspoken in his opinions and critical of superiors and subordinates alike. He was inclined to jump to conclusions which were not always well founded. Fredendall rarely left his command post for personal visits and reconnaissance, yet he was impatient with the recommendations of subordinates more familiar with the terrain and other conditions than he.

=== Tunisia, Oran, and Kasserine Pass ===
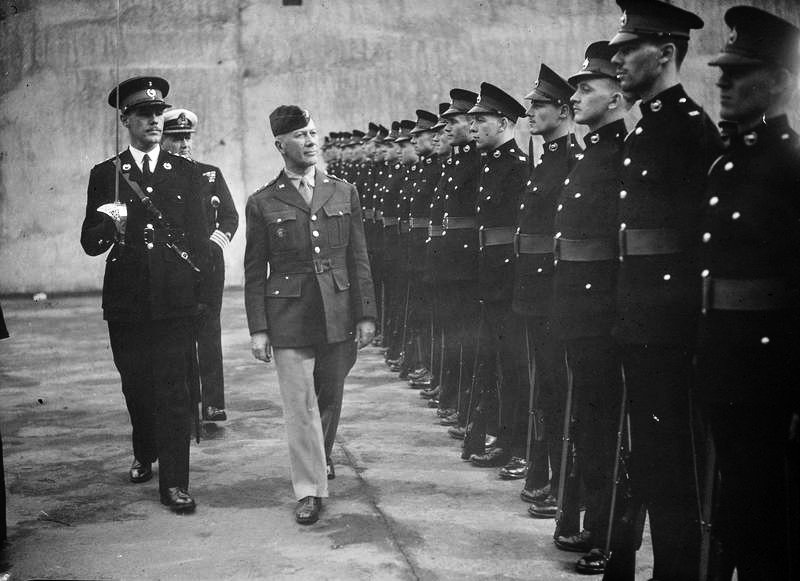
Fredendall visits the British aircraft carrier HMS Formidable at Oran, 1943.

After the Torch landings, Fredendall became the de facto military governor in Oran. Orders from his headquarters in the Grand Hotel of Oran were headed with "II Corps – In the Field," which prompted derision from his troops, who were living in spartan conditions.

Fredendall was assigned to command the U.S. II Corps in its advance into Tunisia against German forces. (He thus became the second-oldest of the 34 generals to serve as a U.S. Army corps commander in World War II, after Innis P. Swift, commander of the I Corps in the Pacific.) II Corps served under the British First Army, whose commander, Lieutenant General Kenneth Anderson, considered Fredendall incompetent well before the loss at Kasserine. Fredendall was given to speaking and issuing orders using his own slang, such as calling infantry units "walking boys" and artillery "popguns." Instead of using the standard military map grid-based location designators, he made up confusing codes such as "the place that begins with C." This practice was unheard-of for a general and distinguished graduate of the Command and General Staff School, who had been taught to always use standardized language and procedures to ensure clarity when transmitting orders under the stress of combat. Fredendall's informality often led to confusion among his subordinates, and precious time was lost attempting to discern his meaning.

During the advance into Tunisia, Fredendall used an engineer company of the 19th Engineer Regiment to build a large, dug-in corps headquarters bunker 70 miles (110 km) behind the front in a place called Speedy Valley (nine miles southeast of Tébessa). Blasted and drilled out of solid rock, the bunker (actually two U-shaped complexes running 160 feet (49 m) into the hillside) took three weeks to construct. An anti-aircraft battalion was emplaced to protect the headquarters. Fredendall also ordered a bulletproof Cadillac similar to Eisenhower's, and regularly phoned Oran to find out why it was not being delivered faster. Then-Brigadier General Omar Bradley called the headquarters "an embarrassment to every American soldier," and General Eisenhower, the Supreme Allied Commander in North Africa, after viewing the elaborate structure, reminded his senior commanders that even generals must assume personal risk in combat. Fredendall rarely visited the front lines, and had a habit of disregarding advice from commanders who had been farther forward and had actually reconnoitered the terrain. He split up units and scattered them widely, and at critical defense points had positioned U.S. forces (against advice) too far apart for mutual support or effective employment of artillery, the strongest American arm.

During the Battle of Kasserine Pass, Eisenhower sent Major General Ernest N. Harmon to report on the fighting, to assist Fredendall and the other Allied commanders, and to determine whether Fredendall or his 1st Armored Division commander, Major General Orlando Ward, should be replaced. Harmon noted that Fredendall and his superior, Anderson, rarely saw each other, and failed to properly coordinate and integrate forces under their command. Fredendall was barely on speaking terms with Ward, whom he had deliberately left out of operational meetings after Ward had repeatedly protested the separation of his command into weaker 'penny packet' forces distributed across various sectors of the front.

Allied forces were bereft of air support during critical attacks, and were frequently positioned by the senior command in positions where they could not support each other. Subordinates later recalled their utter confusion at being handed conflicting orders, not knowing which general to obey—Anderson or Fredendall. While interviewing field commanders, Harmon heard much criticism over what many Allied officers viewed as a cowardly, confused, and out-of-touch command. Noting that Fredendall seemed out of touch (and at one point, intoxicated), Harmon requested and received permission to go to the front and intervene where necessary to shore up Allied defenses.

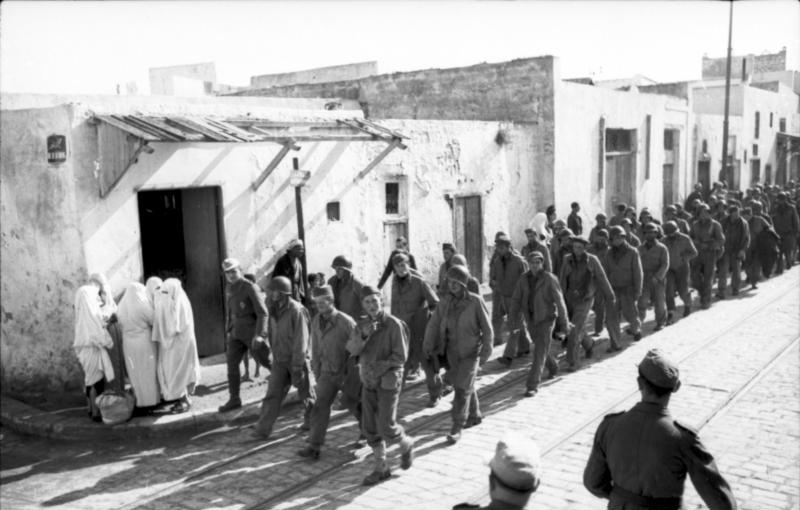
American troops taken prisoner at Kasserine Pass marching through a Tunisian village, January 1943.

On March 5, 1943, after the American rout at Kasserine Pass, Eisenhower visited II Corps headquarters and conferred with Brigadier General Bradley. Eisenhower asked "What do you think of the command here?" Bradley's response was "It's pretty bad. I've talked to all the division commanders. To a man they've lost confidence in Fredendall as the corps commander." British General Sir Harold Alexander, the 18th Army Group commander, informed Eisenhower that he would welcome a replacement for Fredendall. Eisenhower offered the II Corps command to Harmon, who declined on the grounds that it would be unethical to appear to personally benefit from his negative assessment of Fredendall.

Eisenhower then decided on Major General George S. Patton as Fredendall's replacement. On March 5, 1943, Eisenhower personally flew to Tebessa to inform Fredendall of his decision to replace him, which he couched in terms of a routine reassignment. Eisenhower arranged the replacement so that Fredendall's reputation was not formally brought into disrepute, an action some believe he soon came to regret. On March 6, 1943, Patton replaced Fredendall. When Patton arrived at II Corps headquarters, Fredendall was at breakfast. Patton had disliked Fredendall since 1941 when they were both division commanders at Fort Benning, Georgia. After a brief conference, Patton formally relieved him, saying II Corps "was primarily a tank show and I know more about tanks." Patton noted in his diary that Fredendall was "Very nice, conducted himself well – very well." In a letter to his wife Beatrice that day, Patton even wrote that "Fredendall is a great sport, and I feel sure, is a victim largely due to circumstances beyond his control." However, only a week later, after an initial inspection of his new command, Patton had completely changed his mind: "I cannot see what Fredendall did to justify his existence." Fredendall was the first of seven American corps commanders in World War II to be "relieved of command", most for medical reasons.

In his after-action report for the Kasserine battles, the 2nd Armored Division commander, Major General Ernest N. Harmon, called Fredendall both a moral and a physical coward and later said he was "a son of a bitch."

=== Reassignment and stateside duty ===
At Eisenhower's recommendation, Fredendall returned to the United States. Eisenhower's aide made a report on Fredendall to President Franklin D. Roosevelt, in which he communicated, without elaboration, Eisenhower's view that Fredendall should be reassigned to a training command. As a result, Fredendall spent the rest of the war in command of the Second Army which was responsible for training in the eastern United States. Because he had not been formally reprimanded by Eisenhower, he was eligible for appointment to lieutenant general and three-star assignment, which he duly received, along with a hero's welcome on his return to the United States. His promotion became effective in June 1943.

While commanding the Central Defense Command and the U.S. Second Army at Memphis, Tennessee, Fredendall supervised training and field maneuvers, gave away brides, and at first even granted interviews to members of the press. However, after a sarcastic comment on his generalship by a Time magazine reporter, Fredendall changed his mind, and largely blocked further press coverage of his command. The widespread custom of theater commanders to transfer senior commanders who had failed in battlefield assignments to stateside training commands did not in any way improve the reputation or morale of the latter, who were now saddled with the difficult job of convincing a disgraced commander to take the lead in advocating radical improvements in existing army training programs—programs which, like Fredendall himself, had contributed to the embarrassing U.S. Army reverses in North Africa.

Author Charles B. MacDonald described Fredendall as a "man of bombast and bravado in speech and manner [who] failed to live up to the image he tried to create." Historian Carlo D'Este has described Fredendall as "one of the most inept senior officers to hold a high command during World War II."

Fredendall served through the end of the war in 1945, and retired on March 31, 1946.

== Death ==
Fredendall died in San Diego, California, on October 4, 1963. He is interred at Fort Rosecrans National Cemetery Officers Sections, Site 52-A, along with his wife Crystal Daphne Chant (July 23, 1890 – April 30, 1972).

== In popular culture ==
In "The New Normal", an episode of the television series Blue Bloods, New York City Police Commissioner Frank Reagan negatively reviews the performance of a precinct commander by drawing a parallel between the captain's poor leadership of his precinct and Fredendall's conduct at Kasserine Pass.

Fredendall was portrayed by William Boyett in Ike: The War Years.

== Commands ==
- 1936–1938, Commanding Officer 57th Infantry Regiment
- October 9, 1940 – August 18, 1941, 4th Infantry Division
- June 15, 1942 – October 9, 1942, XI Corps
- October 10, 1942 – March 5, 1943, II Corps
- November 1942, Central Task Force, Operation Torch, North Africa
- April 25, 1943 – April 1, 1946, Second United States Army
- April 25, 1943 – January 15, 1944, Central Defense Command

== Awards ==

| 1st row | Distinguished Service Medal with oak leaf cluster | | Philippine Campaign Medal |
| 2nd row | Mexican Border Service Medal | World War I Victory Medal | American Defense Service Medal |
| 3rd row | American Campaign Medal | European-African-Middle Eastern Campaign Medal with two campaign stars | World War II Victory Medal |

== Promotions ==
| No pin insignia in 1907 | Second Lieutenant, Regular Army: February 13, 1907 |
| | First Lieutenant, Regular Army: September 13, 1911 |
| | Captain, Regular Army: July 7, 1916 |
| | Major, National Army: August 5, 1917 |
| | Lieutenant Colonel, National Army: October 31, 1918 |
| | Major, Regular Army: July 1, 1920 |
| | Lieutenant Colonel, Regular Army: September 1, 1930 |
| | Colonel, Regular Army: August 1, 1935 |
| | Brigadier General, Regular Army: December 1, 1939 |
| | Major General, Army of the United States: October 1, 1940 |
| | Lieutenant General, Army of the United States: June 1, 1943 |
| | Lieutenant General, Retired List: March 31, 1946 |

== See also ==
- Operation Torch
- Battle of Sidi Bou Zid
- Battle of the Kasserine Pass

== Additional sources ==
- Berlin, Robert H. "U.S. Army World War II Corps Commanders: A Composite Biography" The Journal of Military History, Vol. 53, No. 2 (April, 1989), pp. 147–168
- Patton, George S., and Martin Blumenson. The Patton Papers: 1940–1945. Da Capo Press, 1996.
- Tucker, Spencer C. World War II: A Student Encyclopedia. ABC-CLIO, 2005. page 474.

Military offices
| Preceded by Walter E. Prosser | Commanding General 4th Infantry Division; 1940–1941 | Succeeded by Oscar Griswold |
| Preceded by Newly activated organization | Commanding General XI Corps; 1941–1942 | Succeeded by Charles P. Hall |
| Preceded by Mark W. Clark | Commanding General II Corps; 1942–1943 | Succeeded by George S. Patton |
| Preceded by Ben Lear | Commanding General Second Army; 1943–1946 | Succeeded by William Hood Simpson |
