= Eastern Defense Command =

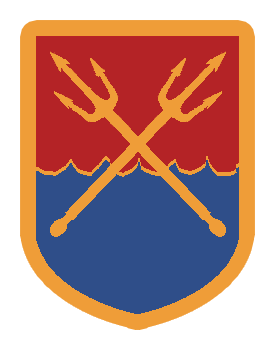
- Eastern Defense Command Emblem
- Active: 1941–1946
- Country: United States
- Branch: United States Army
- Role: Home Defense & Training
- Size: Command
- Part of: United States Department of War
- Headquarters: Fort Jay, Governors Island, New York

The Eastern Defense Command was first established as the Northeast Defense Command on 17 March 1941 as one of four U.S. Army continental defense commands to plan and prepare for and execute defense against enemy attack in the months before America's entry into World War II. Its mission was defined as: "a territorial agency with appropriate staff designed to coordinate or prepare to initiate the execution of all plans for the employment of Army Forces and installations against enemy action in that portion of the United States lying within the command boundaries." This organization was charged with coordinating the defense of the Atlantic Coast, replacing the New England Defense Sector, an organization of the U.S. First Army. However, this did not initially occur, and the command was little more than a planning agency until 24 December 1941.

Following the U.S. entry into World War II on 8 December 1941, the functions of the Northeast Defense Command were placed in a larger operational command, the Eastern Theater of Operations (following the example of the Western Theater of Operations established on the west coast) on 24 December, but the command was renamed the Eastern Defense Command on 20 March 1942. After 24 December, the command exercised control over Army coast defense, antiaircraft, and fighter assets from Maine through Florida. This specifically included the states of Maine, New Hampshire, Vermont, Massachusetts, Rhode Island, Connecticut, New York, New Jersey, Pennsylvania, Delaware, Maryland, Virginia, North Carolina, South Carolina, Georgia and Florida (minus the western half of the Panhandle), as well as the District of Columbia. The command also included US Army forces in Newfoundland and, from April 1942, Bermuda.

The initial subordinate commands included First Army, the First and Third Air Forces, and the First, Second, and Third Corps areas. However, in January 1942 the Third Air Force was moved inland and placed under Air Force Combat Command. In September 1943 First Army and First Air Force were separated from the EDC.

The 26th Infantry Division (26th ID) was initially available to the Eastern Defense Command for mobile defense, stationed in the command's area from December 1941 through mid-1943, though it may have been relieved of this duty earlier. In early 1942 this division was augmented by several regimental combat teams, primarily regiments detached from divisions being "triangularized" (reducing from four infantry regiments to three). The 104th Infantry Regiment of the 26th ID continued on mobile defense duty through January 1943. The other units included at least the 111th, 113th, 181st (detached from the 26th ID), 366th, and 372nd Infantry Regiments. The 144th Infantry Regiment transferred in from the Western Defense Command in January 1943 and was withdrawn in March 1944. The mobile defense force lasted at least through early 1944.

The commanding generals of the defense commands were initially the commanders of the existing Continental Army Commands established under the 1921 amendment to the National Defense Act of 1916 (First through Fourth Armies). The first commander of the Eastern Defense Command was First Army commander Lieutenant General Hugh A. Drum. The command's headquarters was co-located with First Army headquarters and a soon-to-be-established Second Service Command at Fort Jay, Governors Island in New York City.

Lieutenant General George Grunert assumed command of the Eastern Defense Command upon Drum's mandatory retirement at age 64 in October 1943.

As prospects for any enemy attack on the United States all but diminished, Central Defense Command was merged into the Eastern Defense Command on 15 January 1944. In early 1945, Southern Defense Command was also absorbed by the Eastern Defense Command.

With Grunert's retirement in July 1945, his deputy, Brigadier General Kenneth Lord, became interim commander until the appointment of General Jonathan M. Wainwright. This was Wainwright's first command since he was compelled to surrender the Philippines to the Japanese Army in early 1942. In August 1945, he was liberated from a Japanese prisoner of war camp and assumed command after he returned to full duty. Upon Wainwright's 15 January 1946 transfer to Fourth Army at Fort Sam Houston, Lord assumed interim command until the abolition of Eastern Defense Command on 15 March 1946. Its residual staff and functions were transferred to 39th Headquarters and Headquarters Detachment, Special Troops, First Army as it returned from its combat assignment in Europe to its initial stateside posting at Fort Bragg, North Carolina.

== Commanders ==
The following men served as Commanding General, Eastern Defense Command:

- Lieutenant General Hugh A. Drum, 18 March 1941 – 8 October 1943
- Lieutenant General George Grunert, 8 October 1943 – 31 July 1945
- Brigadier General Kenneth P. Lord, (acting) 1 August 1945 – 28 September 1945
- General Jonathan M. Wainwright, 28 September 1945 – 11 January 1946
- Brigadier General Kenneth P. Lord, 11 January 1946 – 15 March 1946

== See also ==
- Western Defense Command
- Central Defense Command
- Southern Defense Command
- Alaska Defense Command
- Antiaircraft Command (United States)
- Caribbean Defense Command
