= Fort Raymond (Alaska) =

U.S. Army Post

Coordinates: 60.1263°N 149.4413°W

Fort Raymond was a U.S. Army Post established in Seward, Alaska in 1942. The fort was named for Charles W. Raymond, who had served in Alaska as a captain in the U.S. Army Corps of Engineers. At one point the garrison included more than 3,000 officers and men. The post was established to protect the dock and railroad facilities in Seward, critical to the buildup of military facilities throughout Alaska, with coastal and anti-aircraft artillery. Supplies and materials arriving by ship to Seward were transported to Anchorage and Interior Alaska via the Alaska Railroad.

The defense of Seward became less important after 1943 when the Japanese forces in the Aleutians were defeated and the threat of attack or invasion was greatly reduced. The construction of the deep water port in Whittier, Alaska, much closer to Anchorage, also reduced Seward's importance.

The Army troops stationed at Fort Raymond were used as stevedores when needed.

Fort Raymond was closed in 1945. The fort's hospital was quickly transferred to the Territory of Alaska by the War Assets Administration, and it was operated as a tuberculosis sanitorium until 1957. The airfield associated with the fort remained and became Walseth Air Force Base after the U.S. Air Force was established as an independent branch of the U.S. armed forces in 1947. Walseth AFB was closed in 1948.
