= Western Defense Command =

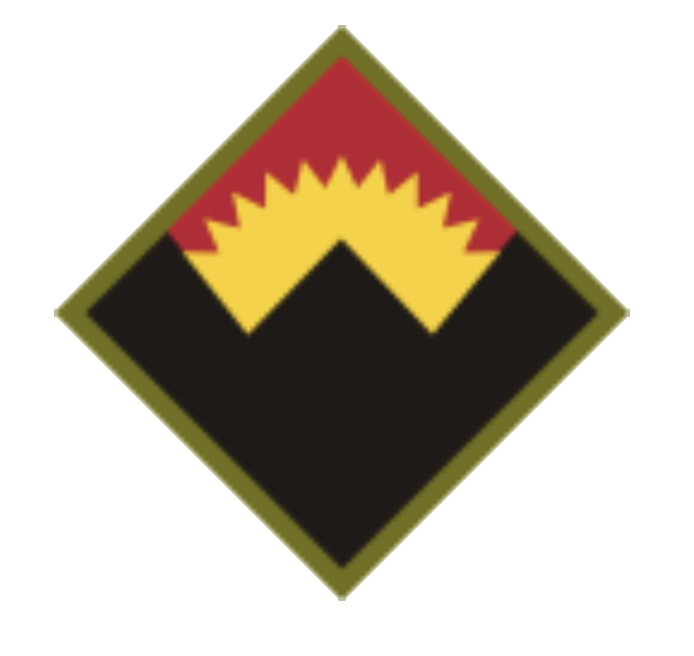
- Western Defense Command WWII Patch
- Active: 1941–1946
- Country: United States
- Branch: United States Army
- Role: Home Defense & Training
- Size: Command
- Part of: United States Department of War
- Garrison/HQ: Presidio of San Francisco
- Engagements: Aleutian Islands Campaign

Commanders
- Commanding General: John L. DeWitt
- Commanding General: Delos C. Emmons

Western Defense Command (WDC) was established on 17 March 1941 as the command formation of the United States Army responsible for coordinating the defense of the Pacific Coast region of the United States during World War II. A second major responsibility was the training of soldiers prior to their deployment overseas. The first Commanding General of WDC was Lieutenant General John L. DeWitt, who continued on in command of the Fourth U.S. Army. WDC headquarters were co-located at the existing Fourth Army headquarters at the Presidio of San Francisco. WDC's operational region covered the states of Washington, Oregon, California, Idaho, Montana, Nevada, Utah, and Arizona, and the Territory of Alaska. Until 11 December 1941, the command was little more than a planning agency. On that date the Army coast defense, antiaircraft, and fighter assets on the West Coast were placed under the command, which until 20 March 1942 was known as the Western Theater of Operations, then reverted to the previous name. From 11 December 1941 until 1 November 1943, Alaska Defense Command was controlled through WDC.

The initial subordinate commands of the WDC in December 1941 were Fourth Army, Second and Fourth Air Forces, and the Ninth Corps Area. However, in January 1942 the Second Air Force was moved inland and placed under Air Force Combat Command. In April 1942, the Ninth Corps Area was removed from WDC command. In September 1943 Fourth Army and Second Air Force were also separated from the WDC.

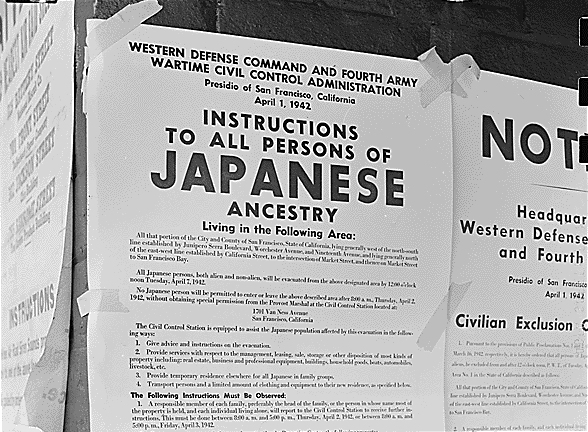
Photograph of the exclusion order issued by WDC and the Fourth U.S. Army on 1 April 1942 concerning all persons, including American citizens, of Japanese ancestry.

On 14 February 1942, Lieutenant General John L. DeWitt, commander of the Western Defense Command, sent a memorandum to Secretary of War Henry L. Stimson recommending that "Japanese and other subversive elements" be removed from the West Coast region. This led President Franklin D. Roosevelt to issue Executive Order 9066 on 19 February, which gave U.S. military commanders the authority to designate "military areas" and to then exclude any or all people from them. On 2 March 1942, General DeWitt issued a proclamation that designated the western halves of Washington, Oregon and California, and the southern third of Arizona to be military areas from which Americans of Japanese ancestry would be excluded from that area. The exclusion zone would later be expanded to include the entire state of California and Executive Order 9066 also encompassed Alaska in the process.

On 19 December 1941, General DeWitt had recommended to the Army's GHQ "that action be initiated at the earliest practicable date to collect all alien subjects fourteen years of age and over, of enemy nations and remove them to the Zone of the Interior". He initially felt very differently about the necessity and practicality of locking up citizens as well, in a telephone conversation with Major General Allen W. Gullion on 26 December. Regardless of this, following the Roberts Commission report of 25 January 1942 accusing persons of Japanese ancestry of widespread espionage in Hawaii prior to Pearl Harbor, along with his perception of public opinion as anti-Japanese, he became a proponent of internment of Japanese and initially German and Italian-descended persons.

The 44th Infantry Division (44th ID) was in the Pacific Northwest from February 1942 through February 1944, and was available for mobile defense through at least February 1943. The 35th Infantry Division (35th ID) was similarly available in California from December 1941 through March 1943. The 3rd Infantry Division was also available from December 1941 through August 1942. Several regimental combat teams, primarily regiments detached from divisions being "triangularized" (reducing from four infantry regiments to three), were also available to the WDC for mobile defense from early 1942. These included at least the 125th, 140th (detached from the 35th ID), 144th, 174th (detached from the 44th ID), 184th, and 364th Infantry Regiments, along with two 155 mm gun battalions of the 54th Coast Artillery Regiment and elements of the 56th Coast Artillery Regiment. This lasted at least through late 1943.

From June 1942 to August 1943, WDC was heavily involved in the planning and execution of the Aleutian Islands Campaign, which succeeded in expelling Japanese forces from their toehold in the American continent on the islands of Attu and Kiska. The operation to re-capture Kiska Island, Operation Cottage, involved both U.S. troops and a brigade of Canadian troops from Pacific Command.

Western Defense Command was disbanded on 6 March 1946.

== Commanders ==
The following men served as Commanding General, Western Defense Command:

- Lieutenant General John L. DeWitt, 17 March 1941 – September 1943
- Lieutenant General Delos C. Emmons, September 1943 – June 1944
- Major General Robert H. Lewis, June 1944
- Major General Charles H. Bonesteel, Jr., June 1944 – November 1944
- Major General Henry Conger Pratt, December 1944 – November 1945
- Major General Harold R. Nichols, December 1945
- General Joseph W. Stilwell, December 1945 – March 1946

== See also ==
- Bibliography of the Japanese American Internment during World War II
- Outline of Japanese American Internment during World War II
- Eastern Defense Command
- Central Defense Command
- Southern Defense Command
- Alaska Defense Command
- Antiaircraft Command (United States)
- Caribbean Defense Command
