= Southern Defense Command =

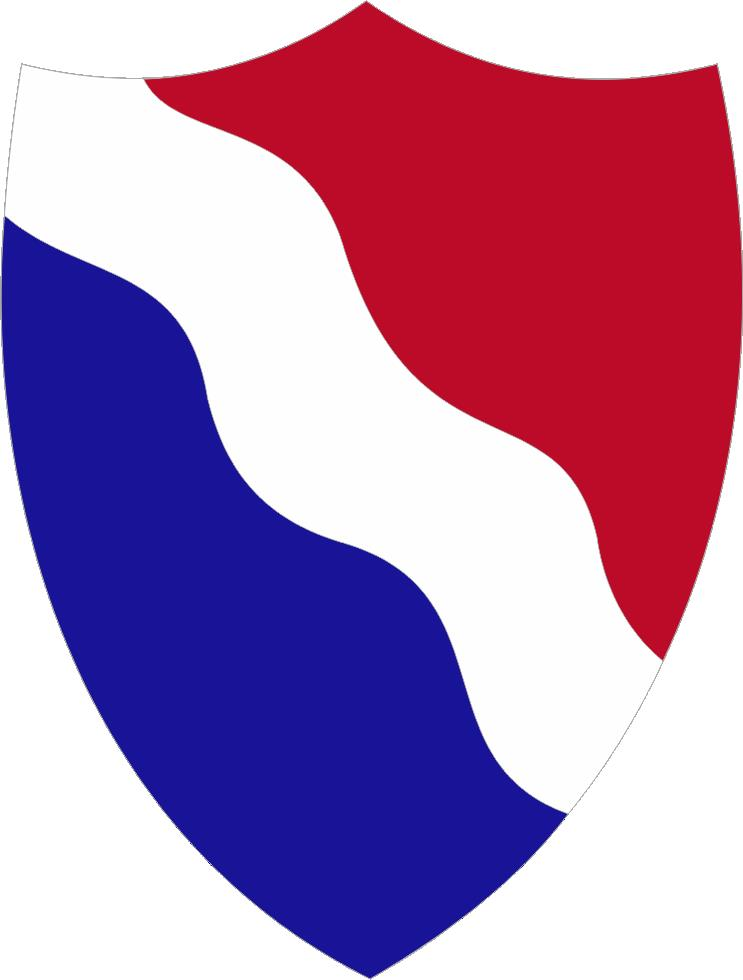
- Southern Defense Command WWII Era Patch
- Active: 1941–1945
- Country: United States
- Branch: United States Army
- Type: Command
- Role: Home Defense & Training
- Part of: United States Department of War
- Garrison/HQ: Fort Sam Houston, Texas

Commanders
- Commanding General: Herbert Brees (March 1941-May 1941)
- Commanding General: Walter Krueger (May 1941-Jan 1943)
- Commanding General: Courtney H. Hodges (Jan 1943-Jan 1944)
- Commanding General: Henry C. Pratt (Jan 1944-Jan 1945)

Southern Defense Command (SDC) was established on 17 March 1941 as the command formation of the U.S. Army responsible for coordinating the defense of the Gulf of Mexico coastal region of the United States. A second major responsibility of SDC was the training of soldiers prior to their deployment overseas. The first Commanding General of SDC was Lieutenant General Herbert Brees, who simultaneously commanded the Third Army. General Brees retired due to age in May 1941, and was replaced by Lieutenant General Walter Krueger, who held both posts until January 1943. SDC headquarters was co-located with the existing Third Army headquarters at Fort Sam Houston. SDC's operational region covered the states of New Mexico, Texas, Oklahoma, Arkansas, Louisiana, Mississippi, Alabama, Tennessee, and the western half of the Florida Panhandle.

At least one regimental combat team, a regiment detached from a division being "triangularized" (reducing from four infantry regiments to three), was available to the SDC for mobile defense from early 1942. This was the 166th Infantry Regiment. This lasted at least through September 1943.

Third U.S. Army was shipped to England in January 1944; once there Lieutenant General George S. Patton, Jr. took over command from General Hodges. Major General Henry C. Pratt assumed command of Southern Defense Command.

In January 1945 Southern Defense Command was merged into Eastern Defense Command.

== Commanders ==
The following men served as Commanding General, Southern Defense Command:

- Lieutenant General Herbert Brees, 17 March 1941 – 15 May 1941
- Lieutenant General Walter Krueger, 16 May 1941 – 2 February 1943
- Lieutenant General Courtney H. Hodges, 2 February 1943 – December 1943
- Major General Henry Conger Pratt, January 1944 – October 1944

== See also ==
- Western Defense Command
- Central Defense Command
- Eastern Defense Command
- Alaska Defense Command
- Antiaircraft Command (United States)
- Caribbean Defense Command
