= Central Defense Command =

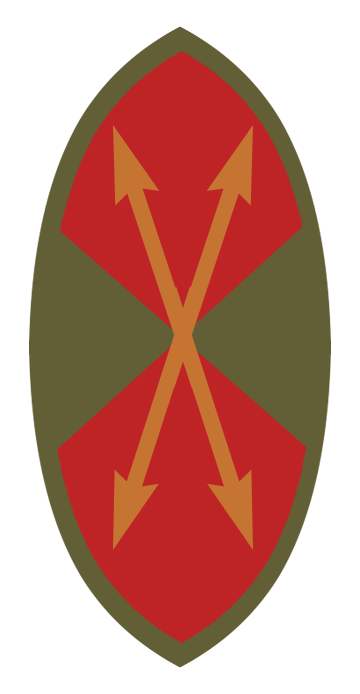
- Central Defense Command Patch WWII
- Active: 1941–1944
- Country: United States
- Branch: United States Army
- Role: Home defense and training
- Garrison/HQ: Memphis, Tennessee, United States

Commanders
- Commanding General: Benjamin Lear
- Commanding General: Lloyd R. Fredendall

Central Defense Command (CDC) was a command formation of the United States Army during World War II. The CDC was established on 17 March 1941, and was responsible for coordinating the defense of the Midwestern United States. A second major responsibility of the CDC was the training of soldiers prior to their deployment overseas. The first commanding general (CG) of the CDC was Lieutenant General Ben Lear, who continued in command of the U.S. Second Army; CDC headquarters was co-located with the existing Second Army headquarters in Memphis, Tennessee. CDC's operational region covered the Fifth, Sixth, and Seventh Corps Areas, comprising the states of Wyoming, Colorado, North Dakota, South Dakota, Nebraska, Kansas, Minnesota, Iowa, Missouri, Wisconsin, Illinois, Indiana, Michigan, Ohio, Kentucky, and West Virginia.

One of the main responsibilities of the CDC was guarding the Sault Ste. Marie locks and the St. Marys River waterway, which connect Lake Superior with Lake Huron. During the waterway's usable season from March through November, 90 percent of the United States' iron ore production for domestic use passed through it in 1939. A battalion of the 2nd Infantry Regiment, stationed at nearby Fort Brady, provided security beginning just after the outbreak of the European war in September 1939; this was reduced to a company in mid-1940 and replaced by a military police battalion in May 1941. After Pearl Harbor in December 1941, fear of possible air or paratroop attacks by German forces led to a major expansion of defense measures. Scenarios envisioned included U-boats in Hudson Bay launching attack aircraft, and one-way bombing or paratroop missions along a great circle route from German-occupied Norway. Units deployed included the 131st Infantry Regiment, the 100th Coast Artillery Regiment (Antiaircraft) (Colored), and a barrage balloon battalion, for a total in mid-1942 of 7,000 troops in the area. Canada provided an antiaircraft battalion of the Canadian Army, elements of the Royal Canadian Mounted Police, and a warning system of 266 aircraft observation posts of the Aircraft Identity Corps extending northward to Hudson Bay. This was augmented by five US-staffed radar stations in northern Ontario. Canada also hosted 2,000 of the US troops defending the area. Given the vast ground defenses, surprisingly no interceptor aircraft were provided. Three emergency landing fields were designated in the area for use by potential air reinforcements, however. By late 1943, with no threat emerging and spare components stockpiled in the event of lock damage, the US forces were cut to 2,500 troops, and the AA and air warning defenses were abandoned. In January 1944 the garrison was further reduced to a single military police battalion.

On 15 January 1944, the Central Defense Command was discontinued and merged into the Eastern Defense Command.

== Commanders ==
The following men served as Commanding General, Central Defense Command:

- Lieutenant General Benjamin Lear, 17 March 1941 – 25 April 1943
- Lieutenant General Lloyd R. Fredendall, 25 April 1943 – 15 January 1944

== See also ==
- Western Defense Command
- Southern Defense Command
- Eastern Defense Command
- Alaska Defense Command
- Antiaircraft Command (United States)
- Caribbean Defense Command
