= 334th Infantry Division =

- German: 334. Infanterie-Division
- Second divisional insignia
- Active: November 1942 – May 1945
- Country: Nazi Germany
- Branch: Army
- Type: Infantry
- Size: Division
- Garrison/HQ: Bamberg
- Engagements: World War II: Tunisian Campaign; Italian Campaign

Commanders
- Notable commanders: Friedrich Weber

Insignia
- First version

- Third version

- Fourth version

The 334th Infantry Division (German: 334. Infanterie-Division) was a German Army infantry division in World War II. Originally formed in November 1942, it surrendered to the Allies at the conclusion of the Tunisian Campaign in May 1943. The division was reconstituted on 3 June 1943 in France within the 1st Army, with the staff of the 80th Infantry Division (which had only just been formed a few days prior) as well as remnants of the old division and replacement units. It spent the remainder of the war serving on the Italian Front.

== Operational history ==
=== Tunisia ===
The 334th Infantry Division was set up on 25 November 1942 as "Kriemhilde" unit of the military districts XIII, XVII and XVIII at the Grafenwoehr training area. It was unusual that their three regiments (754, 755, 756) were drawn up from three different military districts (754/XIII – Nuremberg, 755/XVII – Vienna, 756/XVIII – Salzburg). It had two infantry regiments (754 and 755) and a mountain infantry regiment (756). The division was already destined for a deployment in Africa at this point in time. In January 1943 the division was transferred by ship from Naples to Africa and assigned to the 5th Panzer Army in Tunisia, in a time when the supply ports of the Axis, as well as its forces, where threatened to be encircled in the winter of 1942/43. Its lead elements of the 754. Infanterie-Regiment arrived in Bizerta in late December 1942 under the command of Oberst Friedrich Weber (promoted to Generalmajor on Jan.1,1943), with the rest of the Division arriving by 15 January 1943.

Together with the 10th Panzer Division and the Division “von Manteuffel”, they successfully defended Tunis and northern Tunisia in the "Run for Tunis" in January 1943 as part of the "Company Eilbote" (Unternehmen Eilbote). Between February and March the division ("Kampfgruppe Krause") stayed in the northern Tunisian mountains and remained continually engaged, suffering heavy losses amid heavy fighting, in a series of fierce and costly engagements that cost the division dearly in casualties that it could not replace. The 334th was involved in the storming of Djebel Manson. In late April 1943, "Gruppe Audorff" of the division participated in an attack on the heights of Medjez el Bab. After a week of bloody fighting, the 756.Geb.Inf.Rgt. retired from the heights it had recently regained and moved back towards Tunis. The 334th Division was separated from the rest of the army with the volunteer organization “Phalange africaine” of the Vichy regime, which had been assigned to the Division's 754.Inf.Rgt.(mot.), and surrendered to the Allied troops in the Beja area on 8 May 1943, a few days before the fall of Tunis in the Bizerta bridgehead.

=== Reconstruction ===
After its destruction, the division was reorganized in Bordeaux, southern France, on 3 June 1943. Contrary to the first list, this time all of their soldiers came from the military district of Nuremberg (Wehrkreis XIII). On 20 October 1943, Generalleutnant Walter Scheller took over the Division that was brought to Italy, after some 3 months of intensive training. Used by Army Group C, it was part of the LXXVI Panzer Corps deployed in the sector of the 10th Army on the Ligurian coast in the Genoa area. In early 1944, the Division was part of the LI. Mountain Corps (LI. Gebirgs-Armeekorps) relocated south of Pescara to the Gustav Line between Orsogna and Guardiagrele east of the Majella massif. In January the division was assigned the Ost-Btl. 555 as III./755; temporarily renamed Stab III and 9.-12. Kp. Grenadier-Rgt. 755 in early 1944 (the FpN change was not entered until 17 Apr 44). In January 1945 the Ost companies were removed from Gren.Rgt. 755, re-designated Russ. Btl. 555 and assigned to 14th Army in Italy as an independent unit. It remained in Italy to the end of the war in northern Italy.

=== Italy ===
Parts of the division were used at Pontecorvo in the Battle of Monte Cassino on the course of the rivers Liri and Sacco. After the fall of the Gustav Line, the division withdrew to Umbria. On the Trasimeno Line (or Albert Line), the 334th was in positions southwest of Castiglione del Lago on Lake Trasimeno. After the collapse of the Trasimeno Line in the first days of July 1944, the division was involved in retreating battles in the Val di Chiana and on the Pratomagno south of Arezzo. Then the division was back in Genoa for rest and refitting.

From the end of July to the end of August, the 334th was deployed in the Reggello-Pelago area southeast of Florence to fight partisans. At the end of August, the division was moved to the area north of Prato. Understrength, the division was assigned to the XIV Panzer Corps in October 1944, and took part in the defensive battles in the Bologna area, with an effective strength of only some 2600 troops, where it was subordinate to the I Parachute Corps from time to time (August 1944 and February 1945). Fighting against the advancing Americans, the division was "virtually destroyed" in Operation Craftsman. In April 1945 the remnants of the division surrendered to the Americans of the US 5th Army in the Dolomites.

The divisional stocks relocated to Liegnitz reached Thuringia in their entirety evacuated by train at the beginning of 1945, where they were captured by American troops in April 1945 and brought to the United States via Frankfurt am Main. There they were recorded again and - with the exception of the Ib documents - filmed. From 1962 they were returned to the Federal Republic of Germany. The documents first came to the document center of the Military History Research Office, from where they were handed over to the Federal Archives-Military Archives after they were closed at the beginning of 1968. This file material is supplemented by captured documents from the Western theater of war, by individual files from other groups of documents formed in the US, in some cases with subject matter (e.g. "EAP") and by donations from private hands, including post-war elaborations by the study group of the US Historical Division.

== War crimes ==
Members of various units of the division were involved in several war crimes in Italy between February and September 1944, with up to thirty civilians executed in each incident. Most of the victims were recorded in an anti-partisan operation north of Prato, in Figline on 6 September 1944 by members of the 756th Grenadier Regiment, 30 people were shot or hanged on the orders of Major Karl Laqua.

According to the Atlante delle stragi naziste e fasciste in Italia project, which was financed by the German Federal Government and led by a commission of historians, around 100 people were killed by members of the 334th Infantry Division.

== Organization ==
=== 334. Infanterie-Division in 1942 ===
Grenadier-Regiment 754 (754th Grenadier Regiment):

Set up on 25 November 1942 for use in Africa with the 334th Infantry Division. The regiment was destroyed in Africa in May 1943.

Grenadier-Regiment 755 (755th Grenadier Regiment):

Set up on 25 November 1942 for use in Africa with the 334th Infantry Division. The regiment was destroyed in Africa in May 1943.

Gebirgsjäger-Regiment 756 (756th Mountain Ranger Regiment):

The Gebirgsjäger-Regiment 756 was set up on 9 November 1942 in Wehrkreis XVIII. The regiment was created as a Kriemhilde unit. The staff was set up by the Gebirgsjäger-Ersatz-Regiment 136 (Mountain Ranger Replacement Regiment 136). The I. Bataillon (Major Röhr) was set up by the Gebirgsjäger-Ersatz-Regiment 137 (Mountain Ranger Replacement Regiment 137). The II. Bataillon was formed from the Gebirgsjäger-Ausbildungs-Bataillon I./136 (Mountain Ranger Training Battalion I./136) and the Gebirgsjäger-Ersatz-Bataillon III./136 (Mountain Ranger Replacement Battalion III./136). The battalions consisted of two mountain troops - one machine gun company and one heavy company. The 13th Company (13. Kompanie) was a tank destroyer company (Panzerjäger-Kompanie).

The regiment was subordinate to the establishment of the 334th Infantry Division. Initially, the regiment completed a four-week training phase on the Grafenwoehr military training area, in Wehrkreis XIII. After that, 1,100 Lower Styrians (Untersteiermärkers/Slovenes) made themselves so intolerable for the regimental leadership through crimes, rebellious behavior and refusal to obey orders that they were not used as soldiers at the front; being, therefore, transferred to other units. In addition, 3 death sentences were carried out. This happened shortly before the relocation to Tunisia, in Africa, which began on 28 December 1942. The gaps had to be made up by vacationers in Africa and other soldiers who were somehow available. The regiment was destroyed in Tunis in 1943.

The Gebirgsjäger-Ersatz-Bataillon I./138 (Mountain Ranger Replacement Battalion I./136) was responsible for the replacement of the regiment.

Artillerie-Regiment 334 (334th Artillery Regiment):

The Artillerie-Regiment 334 was set up on 25 November 1942 at the Grafenwoehr military training area, in Wehrkreis XIII, under Colonel Hans-Joachim Ehlert. The regiment was created as a Kriemhilde regiment through levies from the military districts XIII and XVII. The regimental staff as well as the I. (motorisierte) Abteilung (1st (motorized) Battalion) were set up by the Artillerie-Ersatz-Abteilung 103 (Artillery Replacement Battalion 103). The II. (Gebirgs-) Abteilung (2nd (Mountain) Battalion) was set up by the Gebirgs-Artillerie-Ersatz-Regiment 112 (Mountain Artillery Replacement Regiment 112). The III. (schwere) Abteilung (3rd (heavy) Battalion) was formed by the Artillerie-Ersatz-Abteilung 53 (Artillery Replacement Battalion 53). After the formation, the regiment was subordinated to the 334th Infantry Division. In February 1943 the regiment was reinforced to 10 batteries. In May 1943 the regiment was destroyed in the Tunis area.

Pionier-Bataillon 334 (334th Engineer Battalion):

The battalion was set up on 25 November 1942 at the Grafenwöhr military training area, in Wehrkreis XIII, as a Kriemhilde unit, subordinated to the 334th Infantry Division. The 3rd Company was a Gebirgs-Pionier-Kompanie (Mountain Pioneer Company). In May 1943 it was destroyed in Tunisia.

Schnelle Abteilung 334 (334th Fast Battalion):

Set up on 25 November 1942 with two cycling squadrons and two tank destroyer companies. The unit was destroyed in Tunis in May 1943.

Infanterie-Divisions-Nachrichten-Abteilung 334 (Infantry Division 334th News Battalion):

Raised on 25 November 1942 in Grafenwöhr. Destroyed in Tunis in May 1943. Reestablished on 5 July 1943 in France.

Kommandeur der Infanterie-Divisions-Nachschubtruppen 334 (Commander of Infantry Division 334th Resupply Troops):

Raised on 25 November 1942 in Grafenwöhr. Destroyed in Tunis in May 1943. Relocated in June 1943 to France. On 1 September 1944, renamed Divisions-Versorgungs-Regiment 334 (Divisional 334th Supply Regiment).

=== 334. Infanterie-Division in 1943 ===
Divisional Staff:

Divisional staff taken from the skeleton 80th Infantry Division, designated Divisions-Kommando 80 Infanterie-Division (Divisional Command 80th Infantry Division). Set up on 5 May 1943 as a staff for a division to be set up by the end of July, it was renamed on 3 June 1943 to the staff of the 334th Infantry Division.

Grenadier-Regiment 754 (754th Grenadier Regiment):

Repositioned on 5 June 1943 in France. The III. Battalion was transferred to the 7th Panzer Division on 12 September 1943. The II. Battalion was transferred to the Grenadier Regiment 941 (of the 353rd Infantry Division, in Brittany) on 30 November 1943 and replaced.

Grenadier-Regiment 755 (755th Grenadier Regiment):

Repositioned on 5 June 1943 in France. The III. Battalion was transferred to the 353rd Infantry Division on 12 September 1943. The Eastern Battalion 555 was incorporated as a replacement in 1944.

Grenadier-Regiment 756 (756th Grenadier Regiment):

Established in France on 1 July 1943 for the 334th Infantry Division with two grenadier battalions. The regiment replaced the Gebirgs-Jäger-Regiment 756, which was destroyed in Africa. In 1944, an Eastern battalion was incorporated as the 3rd battalion.

Divisions-Füsilier-Bataillon 334 (Divisional 334th Fusilier Battalion):

Raised in France in June 1943 as Aufklärungs-Abteilung 334 (334th Reconnaissance Battalion) with four companies. Renamed Divisions-Fusilier-Bataillon 334 on 26 July 1943.

Panzerjäger-Abteilung 334 (334th Tank Hunter Battalion):

Raised on 5 June 1943 from the personnel of the Schnelle Abteilung 334 with a tank hunter company, an anti-aircraft company and an Sturmgeschütz-Abteilung (Assault Gun Battalion).

Artillerie-Regiment 334 (334th Artillery Regiment):

The Artillerie-Regiment 334 was reorganized on 20 June 1943 in France. The new regiment was set up with four battalions. The new regiment was again subordinated to the 334th Infantry Division. On 24 November 1943, the 3rd Battalion was handed over to the Artillerie-Regiment 353 and then replaced again. Various units were initially responsible for providing the regiment with replacements. In 1943, Artillerie-Ersatz-Abteilung 10 (Artillery Replacement Battalion 10) took over the provision of replacements for the entire regiment. The regiment was commanded by Colonel Hans-Joachim Ehlert from 1 April 1942 to May 1944; succeeded by Colonel Doenning on 15 May 1944 onwards.

Pionier-Bataillon 334 (334th Engineer Battalion):

The battalions re-formation began on 4 July 1943 in France with the 1st Army. In addition, the battalions 176, 194, 305, 371, 376 and 384 of the new 6th Army, which were in the process of being re-established, supplied levies. The new battalion was also subordinated to the 334th Infantry Division as Divisions-Pionier-Bataillon 334 (Divisional Pioneer Battalion 334). In December 1943, the battalion contributed levies to the formation of the Pioneer Battalion 353 (of the 353rd Infantry Division, in Brittany). The replacements came from the Pionier-Ersatz-Bataillon 46 (Pioneer Replacement Battalion 46) in Regensburg, Wehrkreis XIII.

Feldersatz-Bataillon 334 (334th Field Replacement Battalion):

Formed in October 1943 for the 334th Infantry Division with five companies.

Divisions-Nachrichten-Abteilung 334 (Divisional 334th News Department):

Recreated on 5 July 1943 in France.

Divisions-Nachschubführer 334 (Divisional 334th Supply Command):

Recreated in June 1943 in France. On 1 September 1944, renamed Divisions-Versorgungs-Regiment 334 (Divisional 334th Supply Regiment).

== Legacy ==
The German commander-in-chief in Italy, Albert Kesselring, wrote in his postwar memoirs about his subordinate units, and credited the 334th Infantry Division with a quick emergence as an elite division within weeks of the appointment of Hellmuth Böhlke as commander.

== Commanding officers ==
- Generalmajor Friedrich Weber (15 November 1942 – 15 April 1943)
- Generalmajor Fritz Krause (15 April – 12 May 1943)
- General der Artillerie Heinz Ziegler (24 May – 20 October 1943)
- Generalleutnant Walter Scheller (20 October – 27 November 1943)
- Generalleutnant Hellmuth Böhlke (1 February 1944 – April 1945)

== Bibliography ==
- Werner Haupt (2005). Die deutschen Infanterie-Divisionen, 3 Bände, Band 3: Aufstellungsjahr 1939–1945 [The German Infantry Divisions, 3 volumes, Volume 3: years of deployment 1939–1945], Dörfler Verlag, ISBN 978-3-89555-274-8.
- Mitcham, Samuel W. Jr. (2007). German Order of Battle. Volume Two: 291st – 999th Infantry Divisions, Named Infantry Divisions, and Special Divisions in WWII. PA; United States of America: Stackpole Books. pg. 40–42, ISBN 978-0-8117-3437-0.
- Peter Young (1974), Der Grosse Atlas zum II. Weltkrieg [The Great Atlas for World War II], Südwest Verlag, Munich, pg. 122–130.
- J.Fössinger (1985). Die Abruzzen im Kriegsjahr 1943. Die 334. ID wird dorthin verlegt. [The Abruzzo in the war year of 1943. The 334th ID will be moved there], Self-published.
- J. Fössinger (1987). Die Abruzzen im Kriegsjahr 1944. Der Einsatz der 334. Infanterie-Division [The Abruzzo in the war year of 1944. The deployment of the 334th Infantry Division], Self-published, Bolzano.
- J. Fössinger (1991). Der Einsatz der 334. Infanterie-Division am Trasimenersee, beim Arno und in der Apenninstellung (20. Juni bis 30. September 1944) [The deployment of the 334th Infantry Division on Lake Trasimeno, by the Arno and in the Apennine position (20 June – 30 September 1944)], Kameradenkreis, Pyras.
- J. Fössinger (1993). Die 334. Infanterie-Division bei der Cassino/Rom-Schlacht (11.5. - 20.6.1944) [The 334th Infantry Division at the Cassino / Rome battle (11 May – 20 June 1944)], Self-published Kameradenkreis (Circle of Comrades) of the 334th ID, Merano.
- J. Fössinger (1983). Die Bombardierung von Baragazza am 11.9.1944 und der Kampf um die Apenninstellung [The bombing of Baragazza on 11 September 1944 and the battle for the Apennines], Self-published, Bolzano.
- J. Fössinger (1989). Die 334. Infanterie-Division (neu) im etruskischen Apennin (Italien) von September 1944 bis Kriegsende Mai 1945 [The 334th Infantry Division (new) in the Etruscan Apennines (Italy) from September 1944 to the end of the war in May 1945], Self-published Kameradenkreis of the 334th ID, Pyras.
