= Heinz Ziegler =

German general (1894–1972)

- Born: 19 May 1894; Darkehmen, Province of East Prussia, German Empire
- Died: 21 August 1972 (aged 78); Göttingen, West Germany
- Military career
- Allegiance: German Empire; Weimar Republic; Nazi Germany
- Branch: German Army
- Service years: 1912–1945
- Rank: General der Artillerie
- Commands: 5th Panzer Army; 334th Infantry Division; III Army Corps; 14th Army
- Conflicts: World War I; World War II; Invasion of Poland; Battle of France; Operation Barbarossa; Siege of Leningrad; Tunisia Campaign; Battle of Sidi Bou Zid; Lower Dnieper Offensive; Italian Campaign; Gothic Line Offensive
- Awards: Knight's Cross of the Iron Cross

Heinz Ziegler (19 May 1894 – 21 August 1972) was a German general in the Wehrmacht of Nazi Germany during World War II acting commander of the 5th Panzer Army and commander of the 14th Army. He was a recipient of the Knight's Cross of the Iron Cross.

== Awards and decorations ==
- German Cross in Gold on 26 January 1942 as Oberst im Generalstab (in the General Staff) of General-Kommando of the XXXXII. Armeekorps
- Knight's Cross of the Iron Cross on 16 April 1943 as Generalleutnant and commander of Kampfgruppe/Stab Heeresgruppe Afrika, stellv. Führer 5.Panzer-Armee

Military offices
Preceded by None	Commander of 5. Panzerarmee; 3 December 1942 – 20 February 1943	Succeeded by Generaloberst Hans-Jürgen von Arnim
Preceded by Generalmajor Fritz Krause	Commander of 334. Infanterie-Division; 24 May 1943 – 20 October 1943	Succeeded by Generalleutnant Walter Scheller
Preceded by General der Panzertruppe Hermann Breith	Commander of III. Panzerkorps; 20 October 1943 – 25 November 1943	Succeeded by General der Infanterie Friedrich Schulz
Preceded by General der Panzertruppe Fridolin von Senger und Etterlin	Commander of 14. Armee; 24 October 1944 – 22 November 1944	Succeeded by General der Panzertruppe Traugott Herr
