= Lubań, Pomeranian Voivodeship =

Lubań
- Village
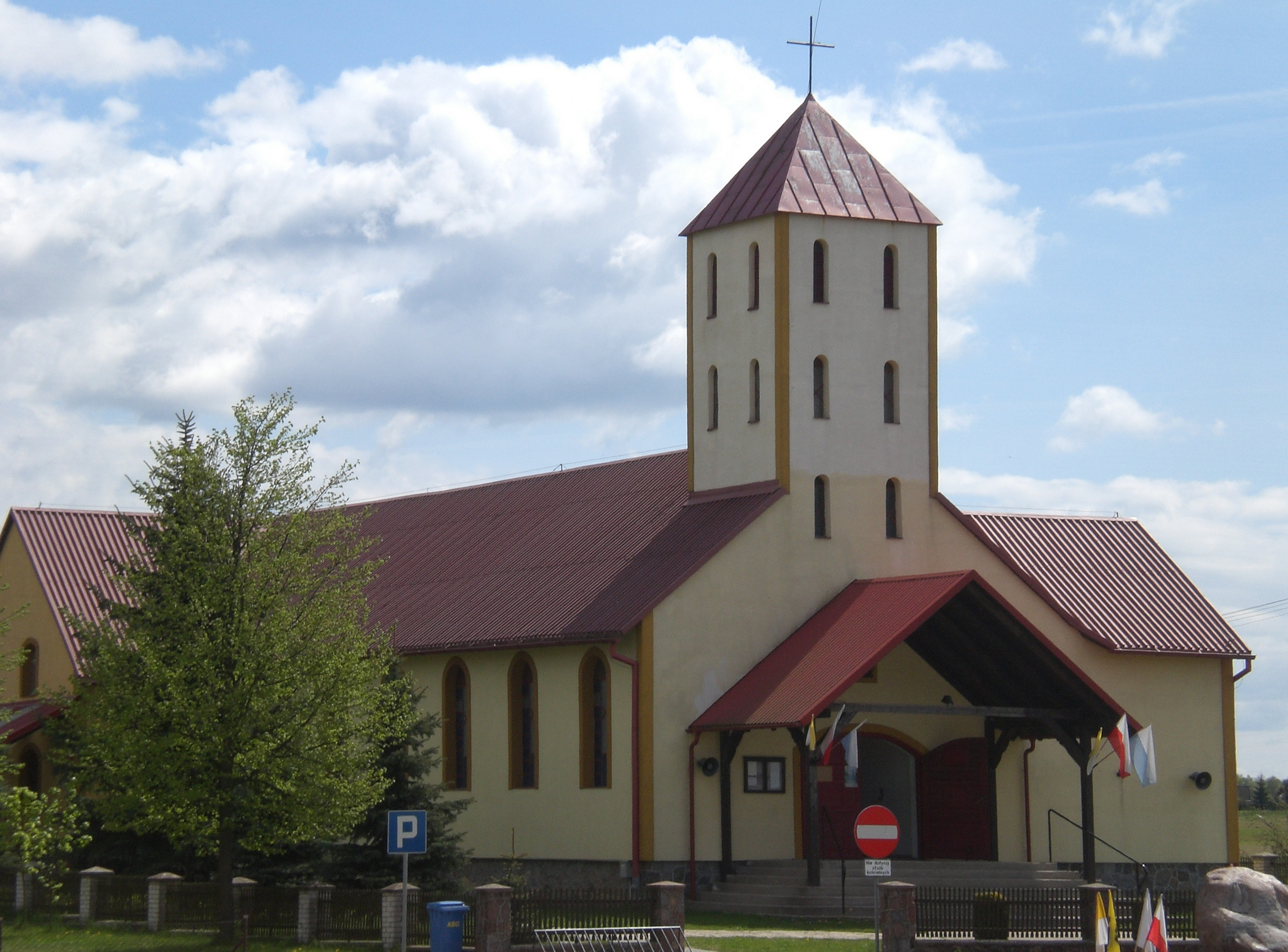
- Saint John Paul II church in Lubań

- Location within Poland
- Coordinates: 54°7′13″N 18°9′44″E
- Country: Poland
- Voivodeship: Pomeranian
- County: Kościerzyna
- Gmina: Nowa Karczma
- Population (2022): 1,007
- Time zone: UTC+1 (CET)
  - Summer (DST): UTC+2 (CEST)
- Postal code: 83-422
- Area code: +48 58
- Vehicle registration: GKS

Lubań [ˈlubaɲ] is a village in the administrative district of Gmina Nowa Karczma, within Kościerzyna County, Pomeranian Voivodeship, in northern Poland. It is located within the historic region of Pomerania.

== History ==
During the German occupation of Poland (World War II), Lubań was one of the sites of executions of Poles, carried out by the Germans in 1939 as part of the Intelligenzaktion. In 1939, the Germans also carried out expulsions of Poles. Local Polish teachers were murdered in the Dachau concentration camp.

== Notable residents ==
- Hellmuth Böhlke (1893–1956), Wehrmacht general
