= Walter Scheller =

WW2 German Army general (1892-1944)

- Born: 27 January 1892; Hannover, German Empire
- Died: 21 July 1944 (aged 52); Brest, Soviet Union
- Military career
- Allegiance: German Empire; Weimar Republic; Nazi Germany
- Branch: Army (Wehrmacht)
- Service years: 1914–1944
- Rank: Generalleutnant
- Commands: 11th Panzer Division; 9th Panzer Division; 334th Infantry Division; 337th Infantry Division
- Conflicts: World War II: Invasion of Poland; Battle of France; Invasion of Yugoslavia; Operation Barbarossa; Siege of Leningrad; Battle of Moscow; Battles of Rzhev; Battle of Kursk; Italian Campaign; Operation Bagration; Lublin–Brest Offensive †
- Awards: Knight's Cross of the Iron Cross

Walter Scheller (27 January 1892 – 21 July 1944) was a general in the Wehrmacht of Nazi Germany during World War II, who commanded several divisions. He was a recipient of the Knight's Cross of the Iron Cross. Scheller was killed at Brest-Litovsk on 21 July 1944, during the Lublin–Brest Offensive.

== World War II ==
Oberst Walter Scheller served in the capacity of Chief of Staff of Wehrkreis X in Hamburg at the start of World War II, a position he took up on 26 August 1939, and would keep until 26 May 1940. He then took command of 8th Rifle Brigade under 8th Panzer Division, which he led into action during the Battle of France. Scheller took the same command into the Invasion of Yugoslavia in Spring 1941, and led the unit into Operation Barbarossa, still under 8th Panzer Division, as part of Army Group North. On 1 October 1941 Walter Scheller was promoted to Generalmajor.

On 20 October 1941 Scheller took command of 11. Panzer-Division until 16 May 1942, when he was called into the reserve (Führerreserve). He led this unit into the Battle of Moscow, and spent the winter in defensive positions on the Yukhnov - Gshatsk (today called Gagarin) axis west and southwest of Moscow. From 22 March to 18 April 1942 the 11. Panzer-Division fought in the Rzhev–Vyazma Strategic Offensive Operation, part of the Battles of Rzhev, and was involved in key operations between Vyazma and Yartsevo until Scheller was recalled.

On 28 July 1942, Scheller took command of the 9. Panzer-Division, and on 4 August 1942, the division was ordered from the Voronezh-Zemlyansk area northwest past Oryol to participate in an attack on Sukhinichi, and was involved in heavy fighting around Zhizdra, where the unit was pushed back across the Zhizdra River. From 9 September the division was pulled into reserve under 9th Army in the Gshatsk area, and found itself in the Sychyovka area by 29 September 1942, facing Soviet forces during the First Rzhev–Sychyovka Offensive Operation.

In November and December 1942 Scheller and his unit were located on the Vazuza River between Rzhev and Vyazma. On 1 January 1943 Scheller was promoted to Generalleutnant, and on 4 February 1943 he was awarded the German Cross in Gold. At the end of February and in March, the 9. Panzer-Division was involved in heavy defensive fighting back in the Zhizdra area, and was then moved south of Oryol in preparation for the Battle of Kursk. On 3 April 1943 Scheller was awarded the Knight's Cross of the Iron Cross. Scheller, who had been decorated with the Knight's Cross for superb leadership, demonstrated rare courage, this time not in the face of the enemy, but his superiors. The general who had been a soldier since he was nineteen years old, knew when he must not obey. On the 21 July, Model relieved Lieutenant General Walter Scheller, veteran commander of 9th Panzer Division, for refusing to make a suicidal counterattack against Bagramian's eastern flank west near Krasnikov. On 20 October 1943, Scheller took command of 334th Infantry Division, which he led until 27 November 1943. He joined his new command in Genoa, Italy, under Army Group B. On 27 November 1943 he took command of 337th Infantry Division under 4th Army in the Orsha-Gorky area in Belarus. He commanded this division until 1 February 1944.

On 7 March 1944, Generalleutnant Walter Scheller was given command of the city of Brest-Litovsk. On 22 July 1944, he fell in the fighting for the city during the Lublin–Brest Offensive.

== Awards and decorations ==
- Knight's Cross of the Iron Cross on 3 April 1943 as Generalleutnant and commander of 9. Panzer-Division

Military offices
Preceded by General der Panzertruppe Hans-Karl Freiherr von Esebeck	Commander of 11. Panzer Division; 20 October 1941 – 16 May 1942	Succeeded by General der Panzertruppe Hermann Balck
Preceded by Generalmajor Heinrich-Hermann von Hülsen	Commander of 9. Panzer Division; 4 August 1942 – 21 July 1943	Succeeded by Generalleutnant Erwin Jollasse
Preceded by General der Artillerie Heinz Ziegler	Commander of 334. Infanterie-Division; 20 October 1943 – 27 November 1943	Succeeded by Generalleutnant Hellmuth Böhlke
Preceded by Generalleutnant Otto Schünemann	Commander of 337. Infanterie-Division; 27 December 1943 – 24 July 1944	Succeeded by None
