= Hellmuth Böhlke =

German general

Otto Hellmuth Böhlke
- Born: 7 February 1893; Lubahn, German Empire
- Died: 8 April 1956 (aged 63); Bad Mergentheim, West Germany
- Military career
- Allegiance: German Empire; Weimar Republic; Nazi Germany
- Branch: German Army
- Service years: 1914–1920; 1935–1945
- Rank: Generalleutnant
- Commands: 334th Infantry Division; 1st Parachute Corps
- Conflicts: World War II; Anschluss; Invasion of Poland; Operation Barbarossa; Battle of Białystok–Minsk; Battle of Smolensk (1941); Battle of Moscow; Battles of Rzhev; Italian Campaign; Gothic Line Offensive
- Awards: Knight's Cross of the Iron Cross with Oak Leaves

Hellmuth Böhlke (7 February 1893 – 8 April 1956) was a German general in the Wehrmacht of Nazi Germany during World War II who commanded the 334. Infanterie-Division. He was also a recipient of the Knight's Cross of the Iron Cross with Oak Leaves.

== Awards and decorations ==
- Iron Cross (1914) 2nd Class (12 October 1915) & 1st Class (20 July 1916)
- Clasp to the Iron Cross (1939) 2nd Class (19 September 1939) & 1st Class (9 November 1939)
- German Cross in Gold on 27 October 1941 as Oberst in Infanterie-Regiment 430
- Knight's Cross of the Iron Cross with Oak Leaves
  - Knight's Cross on 24 September 1942 as Oberst and commander of Infanterie-Regiment 430
  - 716th Oak Leaves on 25 January 1945 as Generalleutnant and commander of 334. Infanterie-Division

Military offices
Preceded by Generalleutnant Walter Scheller	Commander of 334. Infanterie-Division; 27 November 1943 – 16 April 1945	Succeeded by None
