= 1st Parachute Corps =

I Fallschirmkorps
- Active: 1944–45
- Disbanded: 1945
- Country: Nazi Germany
- Branch: Luftwaffe
- Type: Fallschirmjäger

Commanders
- Notable commanders: Alfred Schlemm; Richard Heidrich

The I Fallschirmkorps (1st Parachute Corps) was one of the main German Luftwaffe Corps during World War II.

== History ==
This Corps was formed on 1 January 1944 in Rome from Alfred Schlemm's headquarters staff, including from the II Luftwaffe Field Corps and the XIII Luftwaffe Air Corps. The Corps fought exclusively in Italy. During it existence, it was composed of the 1st and 4th Parachute Divisions and several Infantry Divisions.

The 1st Parachute Corps were initially dispatched from Rome to bolster the Winter Line along the Garigliano River, but were urgently transferred to oppose the Allied beachhead at Anzio as part of Operation Shingle. By 18 January 1944, under orders from Field Marshal Alfred Kesselring, their role specifically involved protecting the coastal sector near Rome. The 1st Parachute Corps were made headquarters in charge of the operation to defend the coastal area of Anzio for three days until passing command to Colonel General Eberhard von Mackensen, commander of the Fourteenth Army in northern Italy. And at 0830 on the 22nd, Kesselring directed General Heinrich von Vietinghoff to transfer the headquarters and all combat troops that could be spared of the I Parachute Corps to the Anzio area as quickly as possible.

Allied troops landed in Anzio on 22 January 1944. At 1700, the I Parachute Corps established a defensive line at the Anzio beachhead and took command of all arriving troops, by which point it was clear a major landing was taking place. Of the 1st Parachute Corps, only the 29th Panzer Division were reported to put up significant resistance during the landing. The Corps fought at Anzio for the next three months. Schlemm was cited in the official Armed Forces Communiqué and received the Knight's Cross of the Iron Cross for his efforts.

Later on, the Corps fought in the Battle of Monte Cassino and Battle of Bologna. The Corps capitulated on 3 May 1945 in the Trento – Bolzano – Belluno area in Northern Italy.

== Commanding officer ==
- General der Flieger Alfred Schlemm (1 January 1944 - 1 November 1944)
- General der Fallschirmtruppe Richard Heidrich (1 November 1944 - 23 January 1945)
- Generalleutnant Hellmuth Böhlke (acting, 23 January 1945 - 7 February 1945)
- General der Fallschirmtruppe Richard Heidrich (7 February 1945 - 3 May 1945)
