= Tunisian campaign =

Series of battles in Tunisia during the Second World War

- Part of the North African campaign of the Second World War
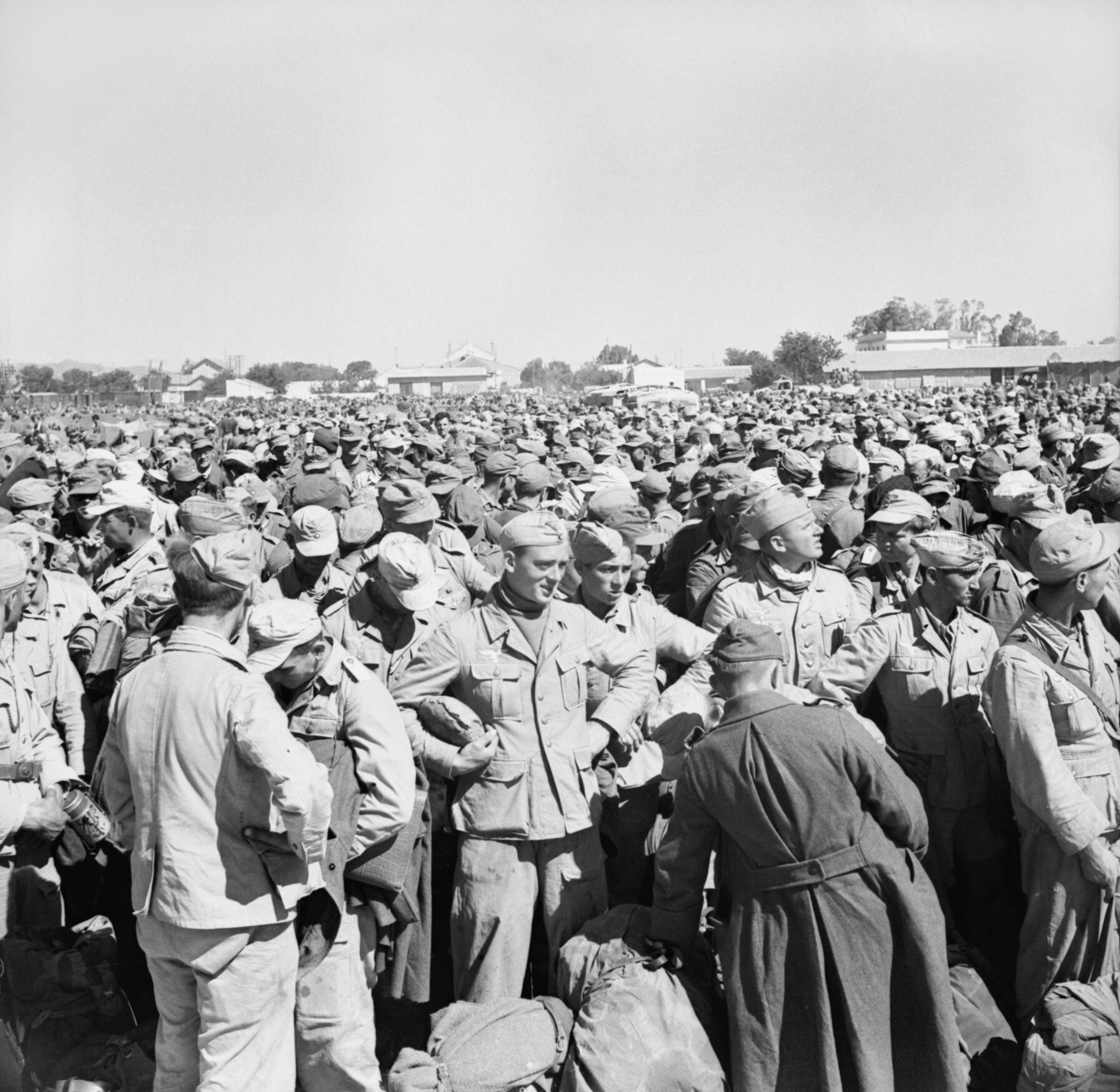
- German and Italian prisoners of war following the fall of Tunis on 12 May 1943
Date	17 November 1942 – 13 May 1943 (5 months, 3 weeks and 5 days)
Location	French Tunisia 34°N 09°E
Result	Allied victory
Territorial changes	Tunisia returns to French administration

Belligerents
United Kingdom: India; New Zealand; Australia; Newfoundland; South Africa; United States; Free France; (Kingdom of Greece) Greece	Germany; Italy

Commanders and leaders
(United States) Dwight D. Eisenhower; (United Kingdom) Harold Alexander; (United Kingdom) Bernard Montgomery; (United Kingdom) Kenneth Anderson; (Free France) Henri Giraud	(Kingdom of Italy) Vittorio Ambrosio; (Nazi Germany) Albert Kesselring; (Nazi Germany) Erwin Rommel; (Nazi Germany) Hans von Arnim (surrendered); (Kingdom of Italy) Giovanni Messe (surrendered)

Strength
March: 500,000 troops 1,800+ tanks 1,200+ field guns Thousands of aircraft	March: 350,000 troops (Note: 2/3 of the combat troops and 1/3 of the support troops were Germans); 200+ tanks (Note: Operational tanks only); 1,000+ field guns Thousands of aircraft

Casualties and losses
76,020; 849 aircraft destroyed 340+ tanks lost (Note: 183 lost in the Battle of Kasserine Pass, 6 lost in the Battle of Medenine, 40 lost in the Battle of El Guettar, 16 lost in Operation Oxhead (Operation Ochsenkopf), at least 51 lost in the Battle of the Mareth Line, 32 lost in the Battle of Wadi Akarit, 12 lost in Operation Vulcan and several more lost in minor battles.)	290,000–362,000 (238,000–300,000 captured); 2,422+ aircraft destroyed 600+ aircraft captured 450+ tanks lost (Note: Mitcham lists the following tank losses with no upper limit and no noted losses to mechanical breakdowns. 34 (20 German, 14 Italian) lost in the Battle of Kasserine Pass, 55 (40 German, 15 Italian) lost in the Battle of Medenine, 45 (mostly German) lost in the Battle of El Guettar, 71 (all German) lost in Operation Oxhead (Operation Ochsenkopf) and 200+ operational tanks (mostly German) lost in actions after March 9. Mitcham also notes that a very large number of tanks were not operational at the time due to previous mechanical issues; for instance, by April 22, only 45% of German tanks were operational, with the rest confined to workshops. Therefore the actual number of tanks lost after March 9 is possibly around 450 rather than 200.); 1,000+ guns captured Thousands of trucks captured

The Tunisian campaign (also known as the Battle of Tunisia) was a series of battles that took place in Tunisia during the North African campaign of the Second World War, between Axis and Allied forces from 17 November 1942 to 13 May 1943. The Allies consisted of British Imperial Forces, including a Greek contingent, with American and French corps. Despite initial successes by the German and Italian forces brought from the mainland and which had withdrawn into and occupied Tunisia, after their defeat in the Western Desert and the success of Operation Torch, massive supply interdiction efforts and Allied assaults from east and west led to the decisive defeat of the Axis. Over 260,000 German and Italian troops were taken as prisoners of war, including most of the Afrika Korps.

== Background ==
=== Western Desert ===
The first two years of the war in North Africa were characterized by chronic supply shortages and transport problems. The North African coast has few natural harbors and the British base at Alexandria on the Nile delta was some 2,100 km (1,300 mi) by road from the main Italian port at Tripoli in Libya. Smaller ports at Benghazi and Tobruk were 1,050 km (650 mi) and 640 km (400 mi) west of Alexandria on the Litoranea Balbo (Via Balbia) highway running along a narrow corridor along the coast. Control of the central Mediterranean was contested by the British and Italian navies, which were equally matched and exerted a reciprocal constraint supply through Alexandria, Tripoli, Benghazi and Tobruk, although the British could supply Egypt via the long, treacherous route through the Atlantic around the Cape of Good Hope and by the Indian Ocean into the Red Sea.

The chronic difficulty in the supply of military forces in the desert led to several indecisive victories by both sides and long fruitless advances along the coast. The Italian invasion of Egypt by the 10th Army in 1940, advanced 97 km (60 mi) into Egypt and more than 1,600 km (1,000 mi) in a straight line from Tripoli, 600 km (370 mi) from Benghazi and 320 km (200 mi) from Tobruk. The Western Desert Force (WDF) fought a delaying action as it fell back to Mersa Matruh (Matruh), then began Operation Compass, a raid and counter-attack into Libya. The 10th Army was destroyed and the WDF occupied El Agheila, some 970 km (600 mi) from Alexandria. With the arrival of the German Afrika Korps, the Axis counter-attacked in Operation Sonnenblume and in April 1941 reached the limit of their supply capacity at the Egyptian border but failed to recapture Tobruk.

In November 1941 the British Eighth Army recovered, helped by the short supply distance from Alexandria to the front line and launched Operation Crusader, relieving the Siege of Tobruk and again reached El Agheila. The Eighth Army was soon pushed back to Gazala west of Tobruk and at the Battle of Gazala in May 1942, the Axis pushed them all the way back to El Alamein, only 160 km (100 mi) from Alexandria. In 1942, the Royal Navy and Italian Navy were still disputing the Mediterranean but the British hold on Malta, and intelligence from Ultra, allowed the Royal Air Force to sink more Italian supply ships. Large quantities of supplies became available to the British from the United States and the supply situation of the Eighth Army eventually resolved. With the Eighth Army no longer constrained, the Axis were driven westwards from Egypt following the Second Battle of El Alamein in November 1942.

=== Operation Torch ===
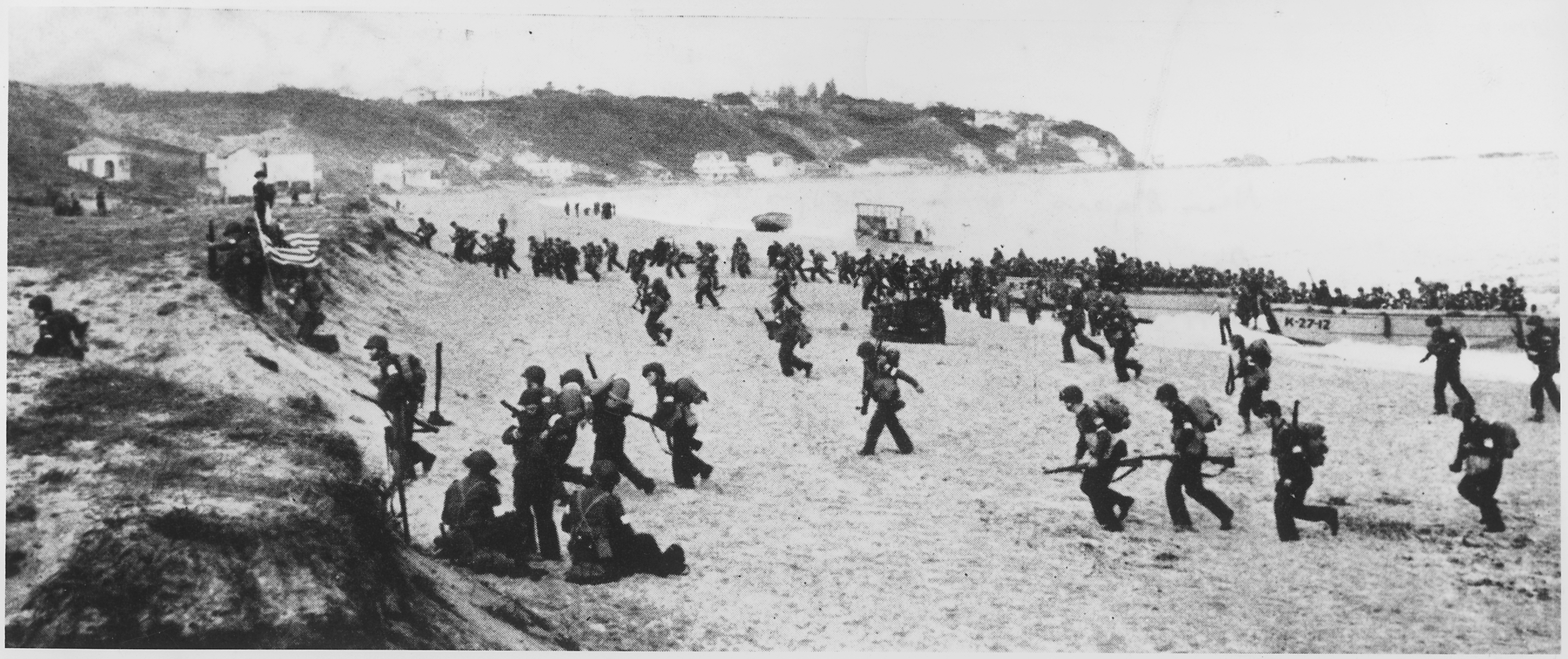
American troops land on an Algerian beach during Operation Torch.

In July 1942, the Allies discussed relatively small-scale amphibious operations to land in northern France during 1942 (Operation Sledgehammer, which was the forerunner of Operation Roundup, the main landings in 1943), but agreed that these operations were impractical and should be deferred. Instead it was agreed that landings would be made to secure the Vichy territories in North Africa (Morocco, Algeria and Tunisia) and then to thrust east to take the Axis forces in the Western Desert in their rear. An Allied occupation of the whole of the North African coast would open the Mediterranean to Allied shipping, releasing the huge capacity required to maintain supplies around the circuitous route via the Cape of Good Hope. On 8 November, Operation Torch landed Allied forces in Algeria (at Oran and Algiers) and Morocco (at Casablanca) with the intention that once Vichy forces in Algeria had capitulated, an advance would be made to Tunis some 800 km (500 mi) to the east.

== Prelude ==
=== Allied plans ===
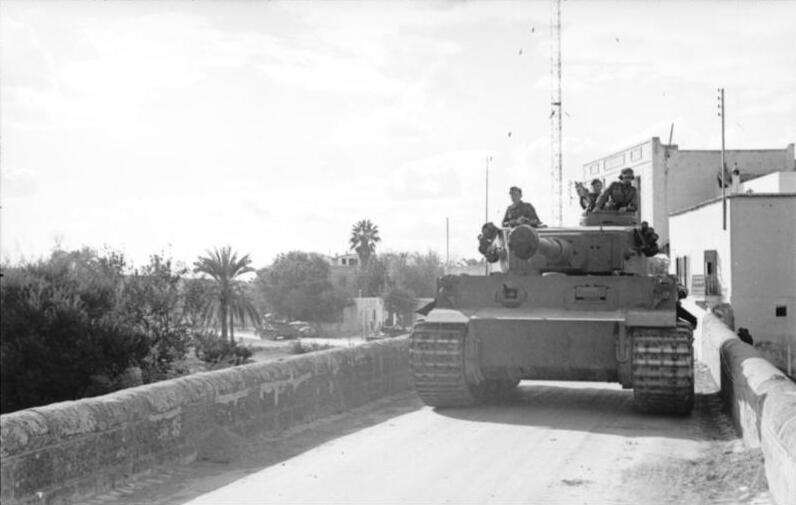
Tiger tank in a Tunisian village, 1943.

Because of the nearness of Sicily to Tunisia, the Allies expected that the Axis would move to occupy the country as soon as they heard of the Torch landings. To forestall this, it would be necessary to occupy Tunisia as quickly as possible after the landings were made. However, there was a limit to how far east the Torch landings could be made because of the increasing proximity of Axis airfields in Sicily and Sardinia which at the end of October held 298 German and 574 Italian aircraft. Algiers was accordingly chosen for the most easterly landings. This would ensure the success of the initial landings in spite of uncertainty as to how the incumbent French forces would react. Once Algiers was secured, a small force, the Eastern Task Force, would be projected as quickly as possible into Tunisia in a race to occupy Tunis, some 800 km (500 mi) distant along poor roads in difficult terrain during the winter rainy season, before the Axis could organise.

However, because planners had to assume the worst case regarding the extent of Vichy opposition at Algiers, the invasion convoys were assault-loaded with a preponderance of infantry to meet heavy ground opposition. This meant that at Algiers the disembarkation of mobile forces for an advance to Tunisia would necessarily be delayed. Plans were thus a compromise, and the Allies realised that an attempt to reach Bizerte and Tunis overland before the Axis could establish themselves represented a gamble that depended on the ability of the navy and air force to delay the Axis build-up. The Allies, although they had provided for the possibility of strong Vichy opposition to their landings both in terms of infantry and air force allocations, seriously underestimated the Axis appetite for and speed of intervention in Tunisia.

Once operations had commenced, despite clear intelligence reports regarding the Axis reaction, the Allies were slow to respond. It was not until nearly two weeks after the landings that air and naval plans were made to interdict Axis sea transport to Tunis. At the end of November, naval Force K was reformed in Malta with three cruisers and four destroyers and Force Q formed in Bône with three cruisers and two destroyers. No Axis ships sailing to Tunis were sunk in November but the Allied naval forces had some success in early December sinking seven Axis transports. However, this came too late to affect the fighting on land because the armoured elements of 10th Panzer Division had already arrived. To counter the surface threat, Axis convoys were switched to daylight when they could be protected by air cover, simultaneously denying the Allies the advantage of using radar in night surface combat. Night convoys resumed on completion of the extension of Axis minefields which severely restricted the activities of Force K and Force Q.

=== Tunisia ===
Sketch map of Tunisia during the 1942–1943 campaign

Tunisia is said to be shaped like a pregnant woman, with its northern and much of its eastern boundary (the head and belly) on the Mediterranean coast. Most of the inland western border with Algeria (the back) is astride the eastern line of the Atlas Mountains which run from the Atlantic coast of Morocco, 1,900 kilometres (1,200 mi) east to Tunis. This portion of the border is easily defensible at the small number of passes through the two north–south lines of the mountains. In the south a lower range of mountains limit the approaches to a narrow gap, facing Libya to the east, between the Matmata Hills and the coast. The French had earlier constructed a 20 kilometres (12 mi) wide and 30 kilometres (19 mi) deep series of defensive works known as the Mareth Line along the plain, to defend against an Italian invasion from Libya.

Only in the north was the terrain favourable to attack; here the Atlas Mountains stopped near the eastern coast, leaving a large area on the north-west coast unprotected. Defensive lines in the north could deal with approaching forces, while the Mareth Line made the south secure. In between, there were only a few easily defended passes through the Atlas Mountains. Tunisia has two big deep water ports at Tunis and Bizerte, only a few hundred miles from Italian supply bases in Sicily. Ships could deliver supplies at night, safe from RAF patrols and return the next night, while Libya was a full-day trip, making supply operations vulnerable to daylight air attacks. In Hitler's view, Tunisia could be held indefinitely, upsetting Allied plans in Europe.

== Run for Tunis ==
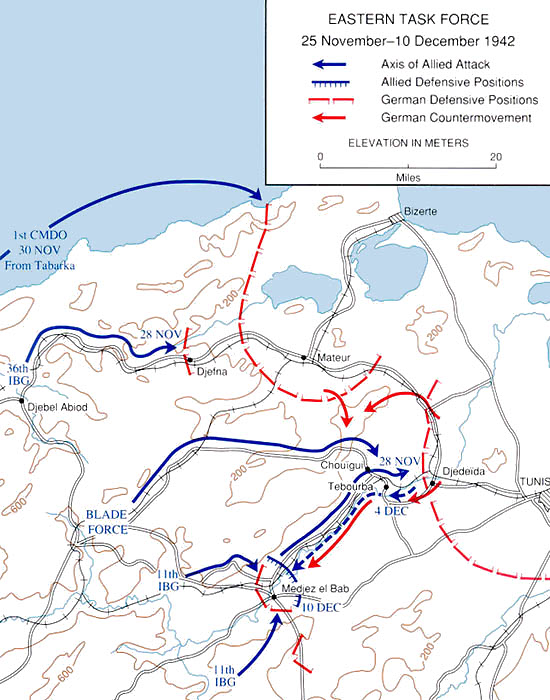
Tunisia campaign operations 25 November to 10 December 1942

By 10 November, French opposition to the Torch landings had ceased, creating a military vacuum in Tunisia. The First Army (Lieutenant-General Kenneth Anderson) was immediately ordered to send the 36th Infantry Brigade Group, which had been the floating reserve for the Algiers landing, eastward by sea to occupy the Algerian ports of Bougie, Philippeville, and Bône, and the airfield at Djedjelli, preliminary to advancing into Tunisia. The Combined Chiefs of Staff had decided that with the forces available, Torch would not include landings close to Tunisia. Anderson needed to get his limited force east quickly, before the Axis could reinforce Tunisia, but the Allies had only two brigade groups and some additional armour and artillery for the attack. (Note: After the event, Anderson and Cunningham, the naval commander, expressed the view that without landings east of Algiers, the race for Tunis was lost before it started. Eisenhower, when accepting the Combined Chiefs' ruling, pointed out that the decision not to land east of Algiers removed the early capture of Tunis "from the realm of the probable to the remotely possible".)

The French governor in Tunisia, Admiral Esteva, was afraid to support the Allies or oppose the Axis, and did not close airfields to either side. The Germans moved first: by 9 November there were reports of 40 German aircraft arriving at Tunis and by 10 November, aerial reconnaissance reported 100 aircraft. Two days later, an airlift began that carried over 15,000 men and 581 long tons (590 t) of supplies, and ships brought 176 tanks, 131 artillery pieces, 1,152 vehicles and 13,000 long tons (13,000 t) of supplies. By the end of the month, three German divisions, including the 10th Panzer Division, and part of the Italian 1st Infantry Division "Superga", had arrived. On January 16, Gen. Arturo Benigni, Infantry Commander of the "Superga", was the first senior Italian officer on the ground. Walther Nehring took command of the new XC Corps on 12 November and arrived on 17 November. The French military commander in Tunisia, General Barré, moved troops into the western mountains of Tunisia and formed a defensive line from Tebersouk through Majaz al Bab (Medjez el Bab).

There were two roads eastwards into Tunisia from Algeria. The Allied plan was to advance along the two roads and take Bizerte and Tunis. On 11 November, the British 36th Infantry Brigade had landed unopposed at Bougie but supply shortages delayed their arrival at Djedjelli until 13 November. Bône airfield was occupied following a parachute drop by British 3rd Parachute Battalion and this was followed by No. 6 Commando seizing the port on 12 November. Advanced guards of the 36th Infantry Brigade reached Tebarka on 15 November and Djebel Abiod on 18 November, where they met Axis forces. Further south, on 15 November, a US parachute battalion made an unopposed drop at Youks-les-Bains, captured the airfield, and advanced to take the airfield at Gafsa on 17 November.

On 19 November Nehring demanded passage for his forces across the bridge at Medjez and was refused by Barré. The Germans attacked twice and were repulsed, but the French defensive success was costly, and, lacking armour and artillery, the French had to withdraw. Some Vichy French forces, such as Barré's, joined the Allies but the overall attitude of Vichy forces remained uncertain until on 22 November, when the "Darlan Deal" placed French North Africa on the Allied side. This allowed US and British forces that had been securing Algeria to go to the front. By this time, the Axis had deployed a corps in Tunisia and outnumbered the Allies there in almost all ways.

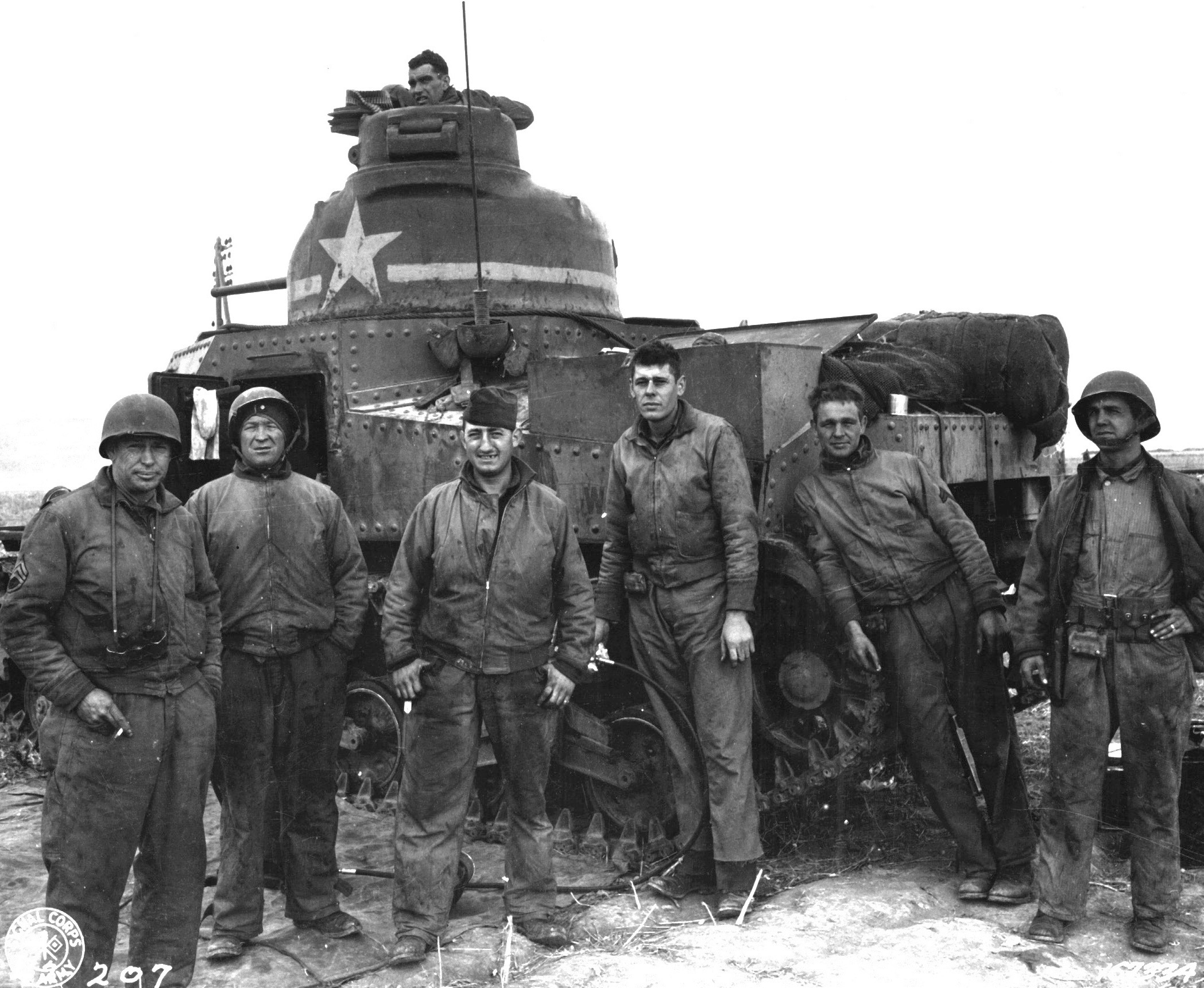
US crew of an M3 Lee tank at Souk el Arba, 23 November 1942

Two Allied brigade groups advanced toward Djebel Abiod and Béja respectively. The Luftwaffe, happy to have local air superiority while Allied planes had to fly from relatively distant bases in Algeria, harassed the two groups all the way. On 17 November, the same day Nehring arrived, the leading elements of the British 36th Brigade on the northern road met a mixed force of 17 tanks and 400 paratroops with self-propelled guns at Djebel Abiod. The German paratroopers, with Luftwaffe and Italian fire support from the 1st Infantry Division "Superga", knocked out 11 tanks but their advance was halted and the fight at Djebel Abiod continued for nine days. On 22 November, tanks from the Italian L Special Brigade forced US paratroopers to abandon Gafsa. The two Allied columns concentrated at Djebel Abiod and Béja, preparing for an assault on 24 November. The 36th Brigade was to advance from Djebel Abiod toward Mateur and 11th Brigade was to move down the valley of the River Merjerda to take Majaz al Bab (shown on Allied maps as Medjez el Bab or just 'Medjez') and then to Tebourba, Djedeida and Tunis. Blade Force, an armoured regimental group made up of 37 mm gun M3 Stuart light tanks and 75 mm M3 GMC self-propelled anti-tank guns, was to strike across country towards Sidi Nsir on minor roads in the gap between the two infantry brigades and make flanking attacks on Tebourba and Djedeida.

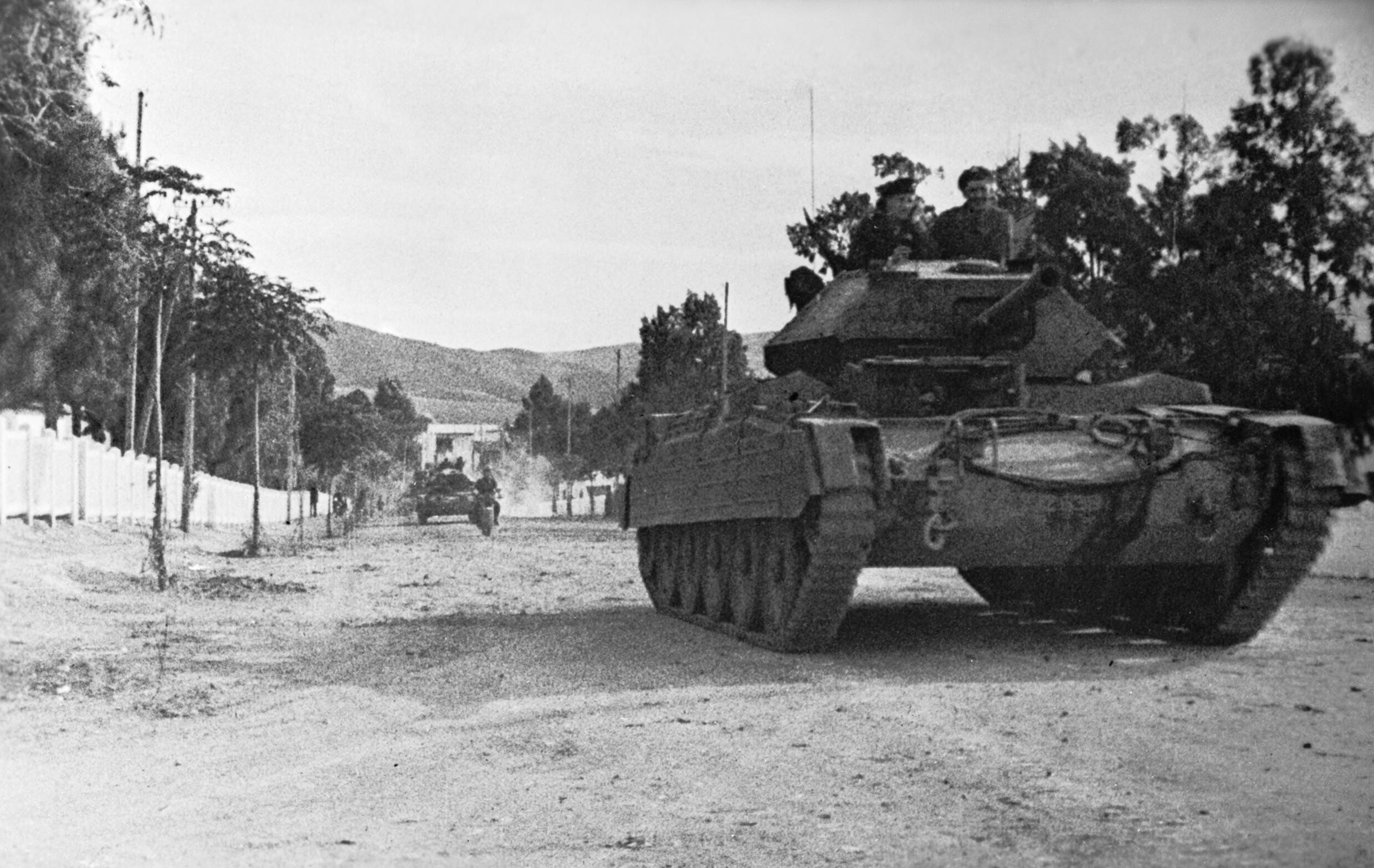
Crusader Mk III tanks in Tunisia, 31 December 1942

The northern attack did not take place because torrential rain had slowed the build-up. In the south, 11th Brigade were halted by stiff resistance at Medjez. Blade Force passed through Sidi Nsir to reach the Chouigui Pass, north of Tebourba. Some Stuarts from Blade Force's B Squadron infiltrated behind Axis lines to the newly activated airbase at Djedeida in the afternoon and destroyed more than 20 Axis planes but, lacking infantry support, withdrew to Chouigui. The understrength tank squadrons and three M3 GMCs were ordered to hold the pass against a mixed Axis unit of Panzer III and Panzer IVs and a small Italian scouting Force, around 15 tanks all told. Frontal attacks by the GMCs and Stuarts were ineffective, losing 12 tanks, but allowed a rear attack by B Squadron firing into the weaker rear armour of the German tanks. The German commander, believing he had encountered a much stronger force, retreated. Blade Force's attack caught Nehring by surprise and he decided to withdraw from Medjez and strengthen Djedeida, only, 30 km (19 mi) from Tunis. The 36th Brigade's delayed attack began on 26 November but they were ambushed, with the leading battalion taking 149 casualties. Further attacks were driven back from cleverly planned interlocking defences. 1 Commando landed 23 km (14 mi) west of Bizerte on 30 November to outflank the Jefna position, but failed and rejoined 36th Brigade by 3 December. The position remained in German hands until the last days of fighting in Tunisia the following spring.

Early on 26 November, as the Germans withdrew, 11 Brigade were able to enter Medjez unopposed and by late in the day had taken positions in and around Tebourba, which had been evacuated by the Germans preparatory to advancing on Djedeida. However, on 27 November the Germans attacked in strength. 11th Brigade tried to regain the initiative in the early hours of 28 November, attacking toward Djedeida airfield with the help of US armour, but failed. On 29 November, Combat Command B of US 1st Armored Division concentrated forward for an attack in conjunction with Blade Force planned for 2 December. They were forestalled by an Axis counter-attack, led by Major-General Wolfgang Fischer, whose 10th Panzer Division had just arrived in Tunisia. By the evening of 2 December, Blade Force had been withdrawn, leaving 11th Brigade and Combat Command B to deal with the Axis attack. The attack threatened to cut off 11th Brigade and break through into the Allied rear, but desperate fighting over four days delayed the Axis advance and permitted a controlled withdrawal to the high ground on each side of the river west of Tebourba.

The Allied force initially withdrew 9.7 km (6 mi) to the high positions of Longstop Hill (roughly, Djebel el Ahmera) and Bou Aoukaz) on each side of the river. Concern over the vulnerability to flanking attacks prompted a further withdrawal west. By the end of 10 December, Allied units held a defensive line just east of Medjez el Bab. Here, they started a build up for another attack and were ready by late December 1942. The slow build up had brought Allied force levels up to a total of 54,000 British, 73,800 American and 7,000 French troops. A hasty intelligence review of Axis forces showed about 125,000 combat and 70,000 service troops, mostly Italian, in front of them. The main attack began the afternoon of 22 December. Despite rain and insufficient air cover, progress was made up the lower ridges of the 900-foot (270 m) Longstop Hill that controlled the river corridor from Medjez to Tebourba and thence to Tunis. After three days of to-and-fro fighting, with ammunition running low and Axis forces now holding adjacent high ground, the Longstop position became untenable and the Allies were forced to withdraw to Medjez. By 26 December 1942 the Allies had withdrawn to the line they had set out from two weeks earlier, having suffered 20,743 casualties.

=== Aftermath ===
==== French politics ====
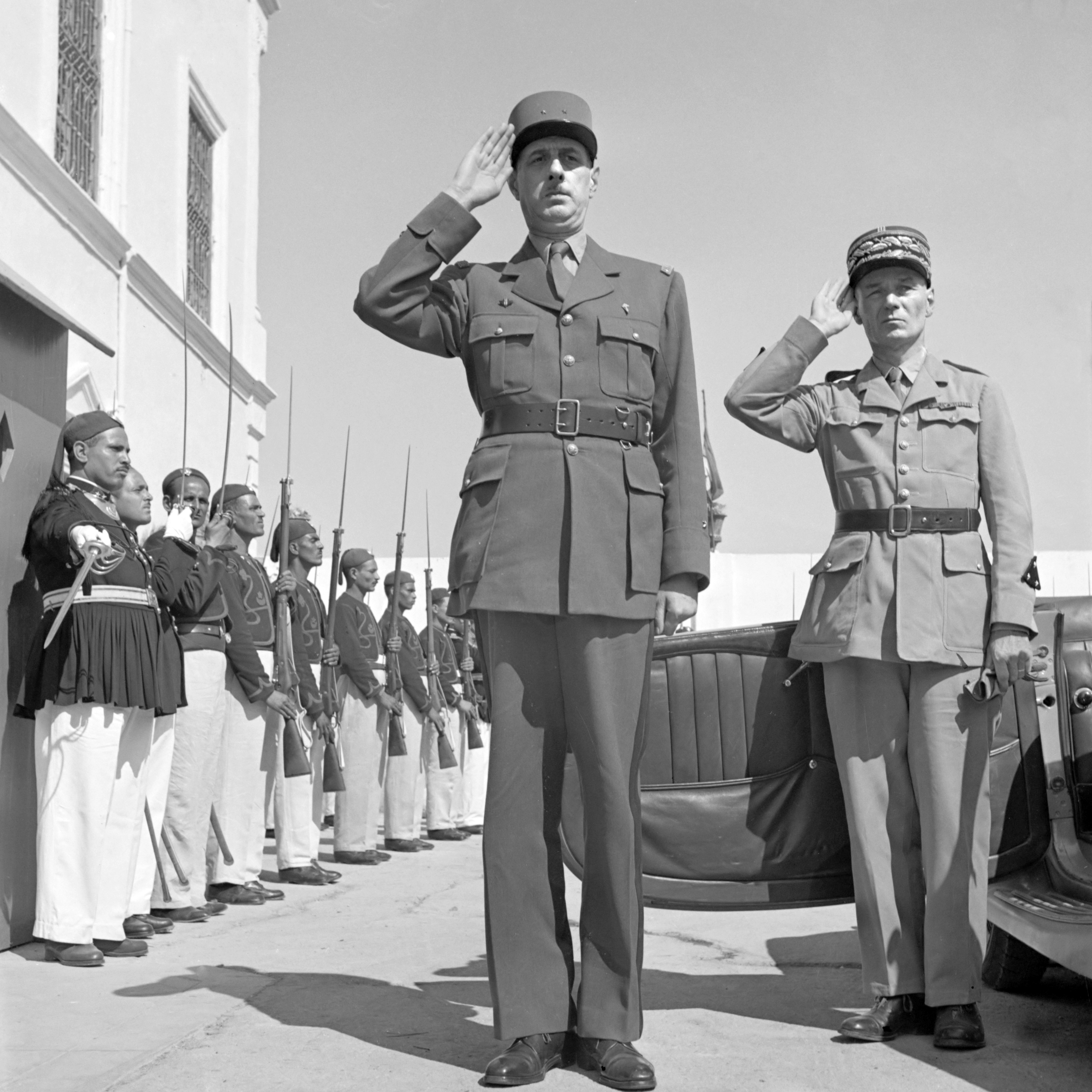
General Charles de Gaulle and General Charles Mast saluting at Tunis, Tunisia, 1943

While the battles wound down, factionalism among the French again erupted. On 24 December, François Darlan was assassinated by an anti-Vichy French monarchist and Henri Giraud succeeded him as High Commissioner. To the frustration of the Free French, the US government had displayed considerable willingness to make a deal with Darlan and the Vichyists. Consequently, Darlan's death appeared to present an opportunity to bring together the French in North Africa and Charles de Gaulle's Free French. De Gaulle and Giraud met in late January but little progress was made in reconciling their differences or the constituencies they represented. It was not until June 1943 that the French Committee of National Liberation (CFLN) was formed under the joint chairmanship of Giraud and de Gaulle. De Gaulle quickly eclipsed Giraud, who openly disliked political responsibility and more or less willingly from then on deferred to the Leader of the Free French.

==== Command changes ====
Nehring, considered by most to be an excellent commander, had continually infuriated his superiors with outspoken critiques. He was "replaced" when the command was renamed the 5th Panzer Army and Colonel-General Hans-Jürgen von Arnim arrived, unannounced, on 8 December to assume command. The Army consisted of the composite von Broich battlegroup in the Bizerte area, the 10th Panzer Division in the centre before Tunis and the 1st Infantry Division "Superga" on the southern flank, but Hitler had told Arnim that the army would grow to three mechanised and three motorised divisions. The Allies had tried to prevent the Axis build up with substantial air and sea forces but Tunis and Bizerte were only 190 km (120 mi) from the ports and airfields of western Sicily, 290 km (180 mi) from Palermo, and 480 km (300 mi) from Naples, making it very difficult to intercept Axis transports, which had the benefit of substantial air cover. From mid-November 1942 to January 1943, 243,000 men and 856,000 long tons (870,000 t) of supplies and equipment arrived in Tunisia by sea and air.

General Eisenhower transferred further units from Morocco and Algeria eastward into Tunisia. In the north, the British First Army, over the next three months, received three more British divisions, the 1st, 4th, and 46th Infantry Divisions, joining the 6th Armoured and 78th Infantry Divisions. By late March the British IX Corps HQ (Lieutenant-General John Crocker) had arrived to join the British V Corps (Lieutenant-General Charles Allfrey) in commanding the expanded army. On their right flank, the basis of a two-division French XIX Corps (General Alphonse Juin) was assembling.

In the south was the US II Corps (Major General Lloyd Fredendall), consisting of the 1st and 34th Infantry Divisions and the 1st Armored Division (although the 34th Division was attached to the British IX Corps to the north). Giraud refused to have the French XIX Corps under the command of the British First Army and so they, along with the US II Corps, remained under command of Allied Force Headquarters (AFHQ). New forward airfields were built to improve air support. The Americans also began bases in Algeria and Tunisia, to form a large forward base at Maknassy, on the eastern edge of the Atlas Mountains, well placed to cut off the Panzerarmee in the south from Tunis and the Fifth Panzer Army in the north.

== Kasserine ==
=== Prelude ===
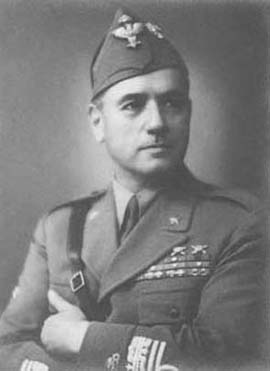
Italian General Giovanni Messe

During the first half of January, Anderson had with mixed results kept constant pressure through limited attacks and reconnaissance in strength. Arnim did the same and on 18 January, launched Operation Eilbote I ("Courier I"). Elements of the 10th Panzer and 334th Infantry divisions attacked from Pont du Fahs to create more space in front of the Superga and Benigni Sectors and forestall an Allied thrust east to the coast at Enfidaville, to cut Rommel's line of communication. The westward thrust against the right wing of the British V Corps at Bou Arada had little success but further south his attack against French positions around the "hinge" of the Western and Eastern Dorsals succeeded, advancing 56 km (35 mi) south to Ousseltia and 40 km (25 mi) south-west to Robaa. The poorly equipped defenders resisted well but were overwhelmed and the equivalent of seven infantry battalions were cut off in the mountains. Anderson sent the 36th Brigade to Robaa and requested Lloyd Fredendall to send Combat Command B from 1st Armored Division to Ousseltia, to come under Juin's orders on arrival. Fierce fighting lasted until 23 January but the front was stabilised.

The obvious lack of Allied co-ordination led Eisenhower to change the command structure. On 21 January Anderson was made responsible for the co-ordination of the whole front, and on 24 January his responsibilities were extended to include "the employment of American troops". That night, Juin accepted the command of Anderson, confirmed by Giraud the next day but with forces spread over a 320 km (200 mi) front and poor communication (Anderson motored over 1,600 km (1,000 mi) in four days to speak to the corps commanders) the practical difficulties remained. Eisenhower appointed an air support commander, Brigadier General Laurence S. Kuter, for the whole front on 21 January.

Erwin Rommel had made plans for forces retreating through Libya to dig-in in front of the defunct French fortifications of the Mareth Line. The Axis forces would control the two natural entrances into Tunisia in the north and south, with only the easily defensible mountain passes between them. In January, those parts of the German-Italian Panzer Army on the Mareth defences were renamed First Italian Army (General Giovanni Messe), separate from the units (including the remains of the Afrika Korps) he had facing the Western Dorsale. On 23 January 1943, the Eighth Army took Tripoli, by which point the army retreating through Libya was already well on its way to the Mareth position. Part of the II US Corps crossed into Tunisia through passes in the Atlas Mountains from Algeria, controlling the interior of the triangle formed by the mountains. Their position raised the possibility of a thrust eastwards towards Sfax on the coast, to cut off the First Italian Army at Mareth from Arnim's forces to the north around Tunis. Rommel could not allow this and formed a plan for a spoiling attack.

=== Battle of Sidi Bou Zid ===
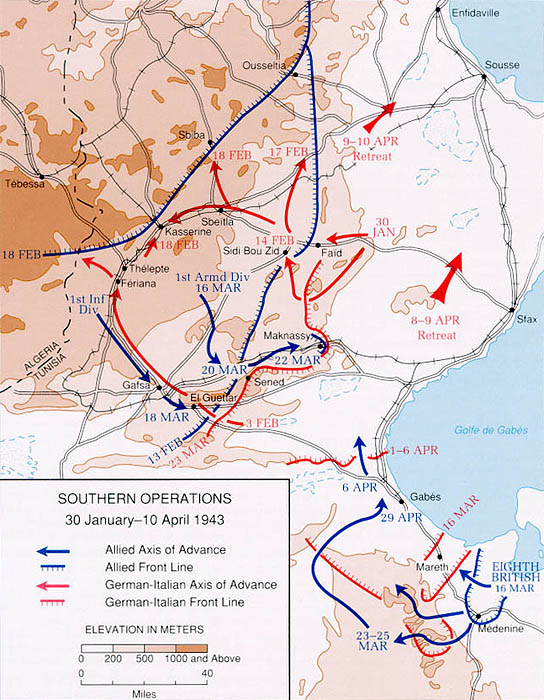
8th Army operations, 30 January to 10 April 1943

On 30 January 1943, the German 21st Panzer and three Italian divisions from the 5th Panzer Army met elements of the French forces near Faïd, the main pass from the eastern arm of the mountains into the coastal plains. Fredendall did not respond to the French request to send reinforcements in the form of tanks from 1st Armored Division and after desperate resistance, the under-equipped French defenders were overrun. Several counterattacks were organised, including a belated attack by Combat Command B of the US 1st Armored Division but all of these were beaten off with ease by Arnim's forces which by this time had created strong defensive positions. After three days, the Allied forces had been forced to pull back and were withdrawn into the interior plains to make a new forward defensive line at the small town of Sbeitla.

In Operation Frühlingswind ("spring wind"), Arnim ordered four armoured battle groups forward on 14 February in the area of Sidi Bou Zid held by 34th Infantry Division's 168th Regimental Combat Team and 1st Armored Division's Combat Command A. The defenders' dispositions were poor, with concentrations dispersed so that they were unable to be mutually supportive. By 15 February, CCA had been severely damaged leaving the infantry units isolated on hilltops. Combat Command C was ordered across country to relieve Sidi Bou Zid but were repelled with heavy losses. By the evening of 15 February, three of the Axis battlegroups were able to head toward Sbeitla, 32 km (20 mi) to the northwest. Pushing aside the remains of CCA and CCC, the battlegroups were confronted by Combat Command B in front of Sbeitla. With the help of air support, CCB held on through the day. However, the air support could not be sustained and the defenders of Sbeitla were obliged to withdraw and the town lay empty by midday on 17 February.

To the south, in Operation Morgenluft ("morning air"), an Italian First Army battlegroup made up of the remains of the Afrika Korps under Karl Bülowius had advanced toward Gafsa at dusk on 15 February to find the town deserted, part of a withdrawal to shorten the Allied front to facilitate a reorganisation involving the withdrawal of French XIX Corps in order to re-equip. II US Corps withdrew to the line of Dernaia-Kasserine-Gap-Sbiba with XIX Corps on their left flank vacating the Eastern Dorsal to conform with them. By the afternoon of 17 February, Rommel's troops had occupied Feriana and Thelepte (roughly 24 km (15 mi) southwest of Kasserine) forcing the evacuation on the morning of 18 February of Thelepte airfield, the main air base in British First Army's southern sector.

=== Battle of Kasserine Pass ===
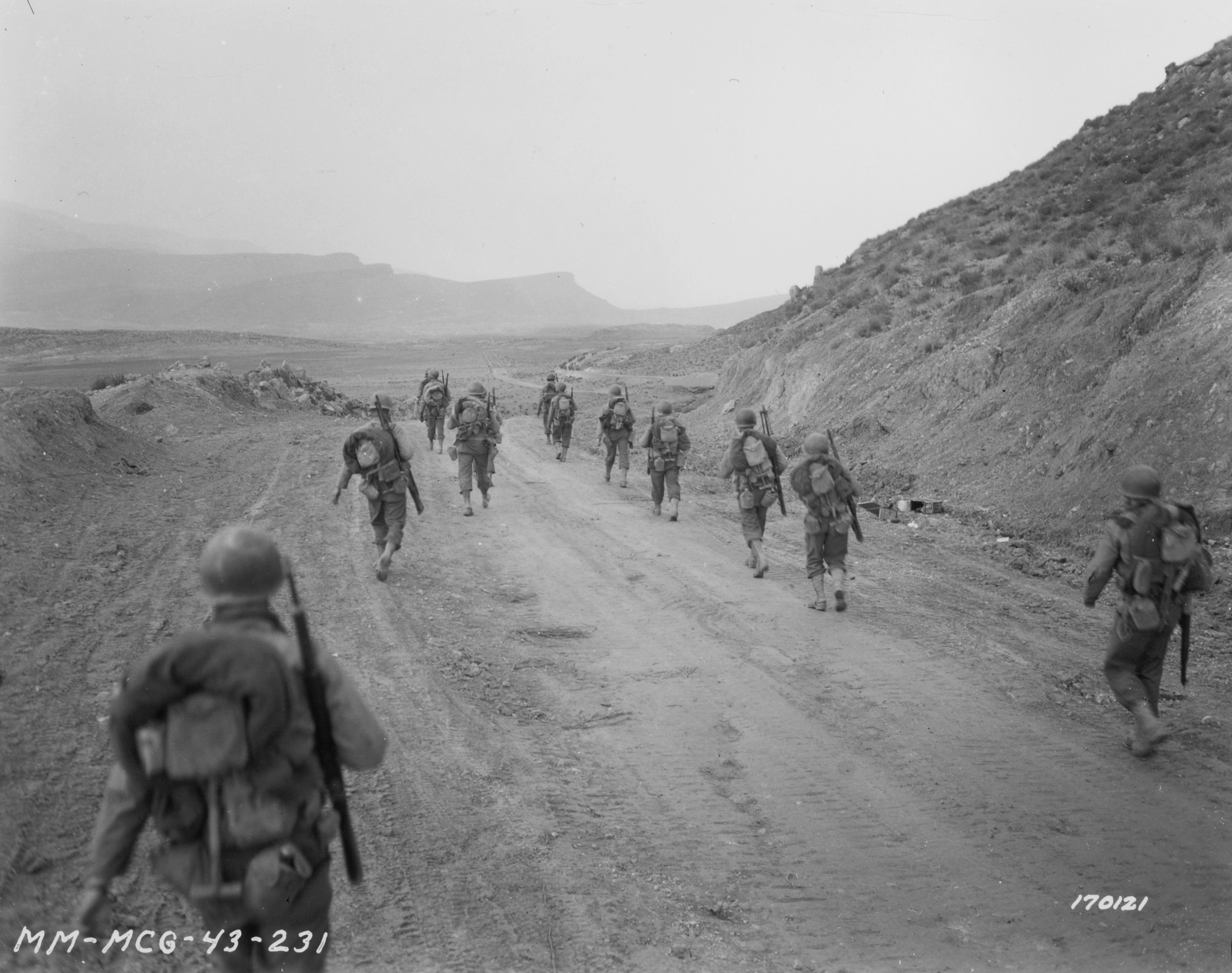
American troops moving through the Kasserine Pass

General Vittorio Ambrosio, the new Chief of the Comando Supremo planned to send 10,000 German troops to Tunis, but the decision was never made due to the lack of Italian naval resources. Aside from Kesselring's unfulfilled promises, Ambrosio knew that even with the German support, the Italian defence would be unable to sustain. After further discussion, the Comando Supremo issued orders on 19 February for Rommel to attack through the Kasserine and Sbiba passes toward Thala and Le Kef to threaten First Army's flank. Rommel's original proposal was for a limited but concentrated attack through Kasserine to confront II Corps' strength at Tébessa and gain vital supplies from the US dumps there. Although he was to have 10th and 21st Panzer Divisions transferred to his command, Rommel was concerned that the new plan would dilute his force concentration and expose his flanks to threat.

On 19 February 1943, Rommel, having now been given formal control of the 10th and 21st Panzer Divisions, the Afrika Korps battlegroup as well as General Messe's forces on the Mareth defences (renamed Italian First Army), launched what would become the Battle of Kasserine Pass. Hoping to take the inexperienced defenders by surprise, he sent the light armour of the 3rd Reconnaissance Battalion racing into the pass. Colonel Alexander Stark's Stark Force, a brigade group made up of US and French units, was responsible for the defence of the pass. It had not had time to organise properly but was able to direct heavy artillery fire from the surrounding heights which brought the leading mechanised units of the Afrika Korps battlegroup to a halt. Before they could continue, infantry had to be sent up into the high ground seeking to eliminate the artillery threat. A battlegroup under Hans-Georg Hildebrand including tanks from 21st Panzer were advancing north from Sbeitla toward the Sbiba Gap. In front of the hills east of Sbiba they were brought to a halt by 1st Guards Brigade and 18th Regimental Combat Team which had strong field and anti-tank artillery support and were joined by two infantry regiments from 34th Infantry Division.

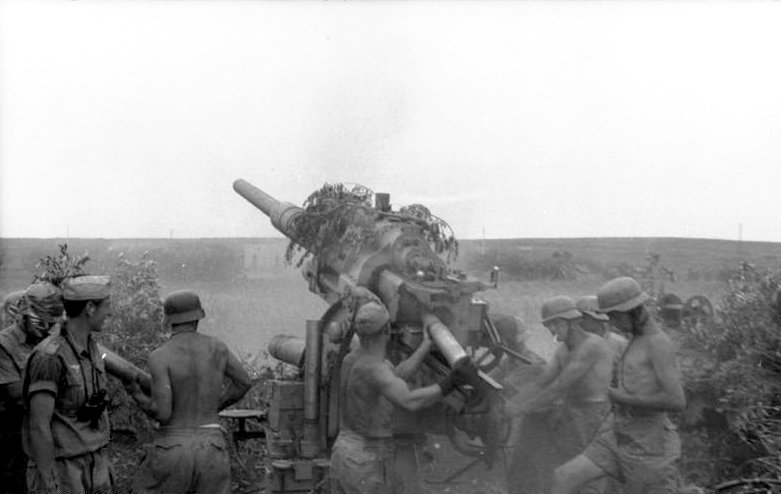
Germans fire an 88mm gun in Tunisia

By the morning of 20 February, the bitter hand-to-hand fighting in the hills above Kasserine was continuing while the Afrika Korps Kampfgruppe and a battalion from the 131st Armoured Division "Centauro" and more artillery, prepared for another attack through the pass, once it had been joined by a 10th Panzer Division battle group from Sbeitla. The morning attack made slow progress but the intense pressure applied during the renewed attack that afternoon triggered a collapse in the Allied defences.

Having rolled through the Kasserine Pass on the afternoon of 20 February, units of the Centauro Division headed west toward Tébessa, meeting little or no resistance. Following them came the von Broich battlegroup from 10th Panzer, which forked right onto the road to Thala where they were slowed by a regimental armoured group from 26th Armoured Brigade (Gore Force). Their tanks outgunned, Gore Force sustained heavy losses but bought time for Nick Force, a composite force from British 6th Armoured Division with tanks from the 2nd Lothians and Border Horse of the 26th Armoured Brigade with extra infantry and artillery (which Anderson had ordered the previous day to leave the Kesra area to bolster the Thala defences) to prepare defensive positions further up the road. Meanwhile, Fredendall had sent 1st Armored Division's CCB to meet the threat to Tébessa.

By 1 pm on 21 February, Battlegroup von Broich was in contact with the dug-in tanks of B Squadron 2nd Lothians and Border Horse of the 26th Armoured Brigade on the Thala road and making slow progress. Rommel took direct control of the attack and forced the defences by 4pm. However, 26th Armoured Brigade were able to withdraw in reasonable order to the next, final, defensive line in front of Thala. Fighting at this position started at 7pm and continued at close quarters for three hours with neither side able to gain a decisive advantage. Nick Force had taken a heavy beating and did not expect to be able to hold out the next day. However, during the night a further 48 artillery pieces from US 9th Infantry Division arrived after a 1,300 km (800 mi) trip from Morocco on poor roads and in bad weather. On the morning of 22 February, as Broich prepared to launch his attack, his front was hit by a devastating artillery barrage. Rommel told Broich to regroup and assume a defensive posture, so surrendering the initiative.

The 21st Panzer battlegroup at Sbiba was making no progress. Further south, the Afrika Korps battlegroup on the road to Tébessa had been halted on 21 February by CCB's armour and artillery dug in on the slopes of Djebel Hamra. An attempt to outflank them during the night of 21 February was a costly failure. A further attack early on 23 February was again beaten back. In a dispirited meeting on 22 February with Kesselring, Rommel argued that faced with stiffening defences and the news that the Eighth Army's lead elements had finally reached Medenine, only a few kilometres from the Mareth Line, he should call off the attack and withdraw to support the Mareth defences, hoping that the Kasserine attack had caused enough damage to deter any offensive action from the west. Kesselring was keen for the offensive to continue but finally agreed that evening, and Comando Supremo formally terminated the operation. The Axis forces from Kasserine reached the Mareth line on 25 February.

=== Aftermath ===
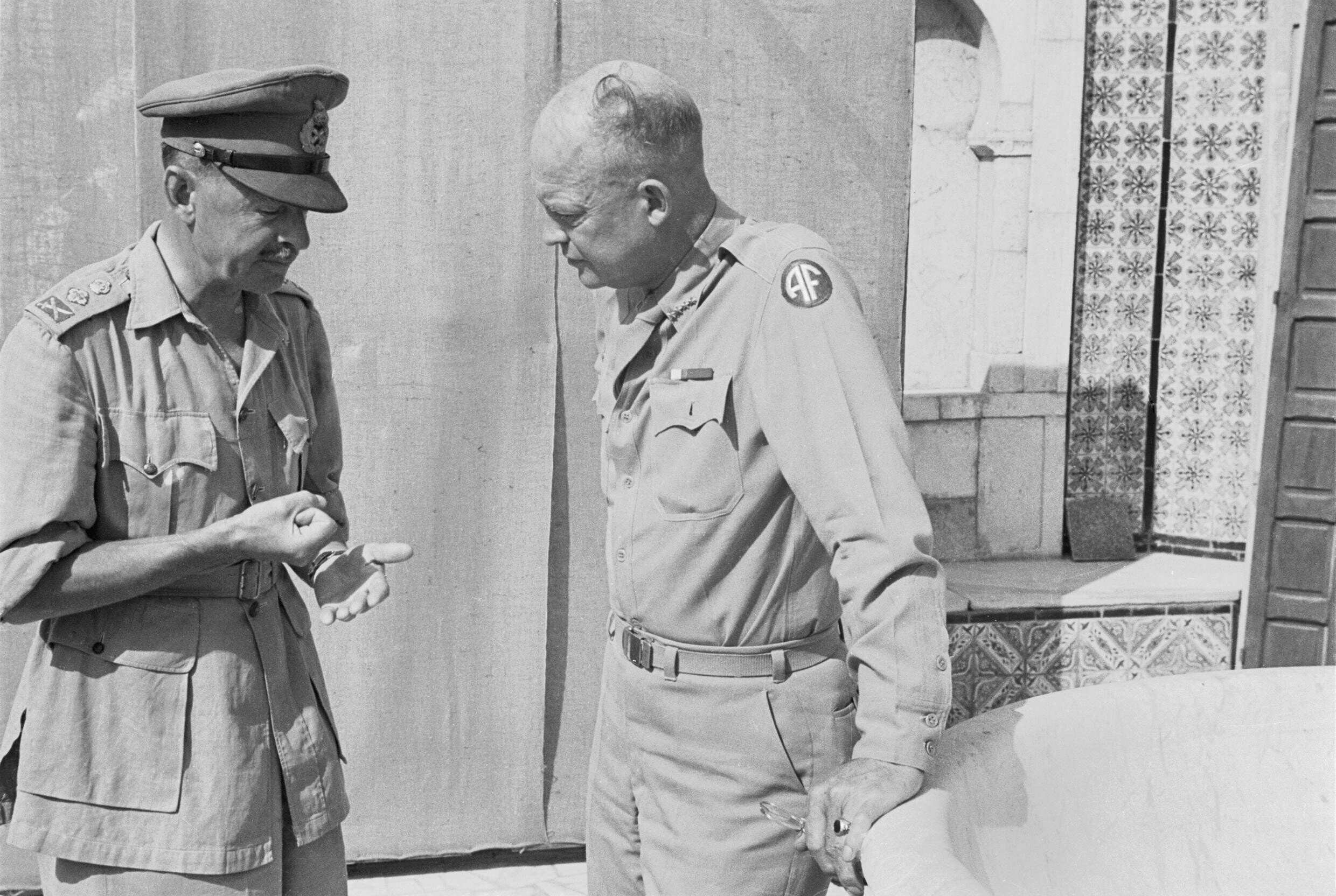
General Alexander, Deputy Commander in Chief Allied Forces in North Africa, discussing operations for Tunisia with the Supreme Commander, General Eisenhower

Action then abated for a time and both sides studied the results of recent battles. Rommel remained convinced that US forces posed little threat, while the British and Commonwealth troops were his equal. He held this opinion for far too long, and it would prove very costly. The Americans likewise studied the battle and relieved several senior commanders while issuing several "lessons learned" publications to improve future performance. Most important, on 6 March 1943 command of the II US Corps passed from Fredendall to George S. Patton, with Omar Bradley as assistant Corps Commander. Commanders were reminded that large units should be kept concentrated to ensure mass on the battlefield, rather than widely dispersed as Fredendall had deployed them. This had the intended side effect of improving the fire control of the already-strong US artillery. Close air support had also been weak (although this had been hampered by the generally poor weather conditions).

At the Casablanca Conference, it had been decided to appoint General Sir Harold Alexander as Deputy Commander-in-Chief of the Allied forces in French North Africa. This came into effect on 20 February and at the same time, in order better to co-ordinate the activities of his two armies in Tunisia, Eisenhower at AFHQ brought First and Eighth Armies under a new headquarters, 18th Army Group, which Alexander was to command. Shortly after taking up his new appointment, Alexander reported to London,

...I am frankly shocked at the whole situation as I have found it...Real fault has been the lack of direction from above from [the] very beginning resulting in no policy and no plan.

and was critical of Anderson although this was later felt to be a little unfair. Once he had been given control of the whole front at the end of January, Anderson's aim had been to reorganise the front into consolidated national sectors and create reserves with which to regain the initiative, the same priorities articulated in Alexander's orders dated 20 February. On 21 February, Alexander declared his objective to destroy all enemy forces in Tunisia by first advancing Eighth Army north of Gabès, while the First Army mounted attacks to draw off reserves which would otherwise be used against the Eighth Army. The armies would gain airfields for the Allied air forces. The co-ordinated land, sea and air power of the Allies would draw a net round the Axis forces in Tunisia by 30 April, to meet the timetable set at the Casablanca Conference to allow Sicily to be invaded during the favourable weather of August.

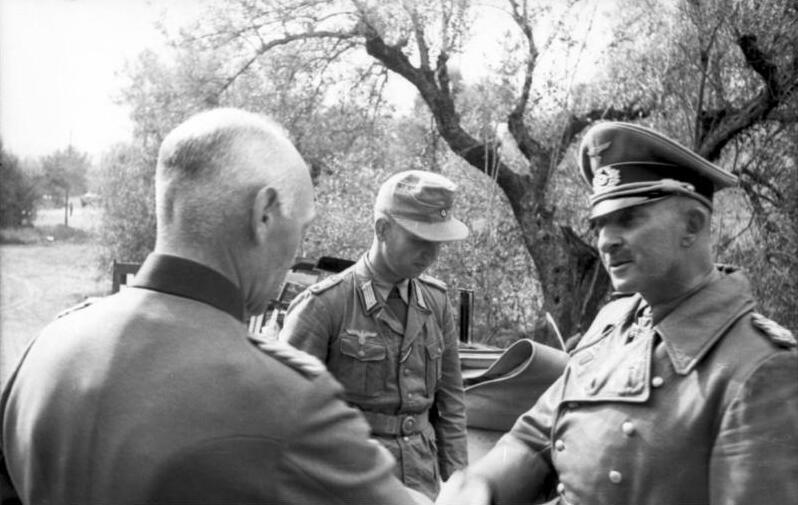
Hans-Jürgen von Arnim (right) Commander-in-Chief of Army Group Africa

The Casablanca Conference had agreed to reorganise the air forces in the Mediterranean to integrate them more closely; Air Chief Marshal Sir Arthur Tedder was made commander of Mediterranean Air Command, responsible for all Allied air activity in the Mediterranean and Major General Carl Spaatz became commander of the Northwest African Air Forces under Tedder, with responsibility for all air operations in Tunisia. By 23 February, Air Marshal Sir Arthur Coningham had succeeded Kuter at the Allied Air Support Command, which became Northwest African Tactical Air Force under Spaatz, with the Desert Air Force supporting Eighth Army, under its operational control.

Coningham found that the air organisation in Tunisia was that of the Western Desert in 1941 when he had first assumed command of the Desert Air Force. The lessons of the Desert Campaign had not been used in planning for Torch, which constrained the ability of the air arm, already short of aircraft and supplies, to provide tactical support to the army during the Run for Tunis. Coningham unified the British and American operational commands and trained them in new operational practices.

The Axis also created a combined command for their two armies. Hitler and the German General Staff (OKH) believed that Arnim should assume command but Kesselring argued for Rommel. Rommel was appointed to command the new Army Group Africa on 23 February.

== Southern front ==
=== Battle of Medenine ===
The Eighth Army had been consolidating in front of the Mareth defences since 17 February, and launched probes westward on 26 February. On 6 March 1943, three German armoured divisions, two light divisions and nine Italian divisions launched Operation Capri, an attack southward in the direction of Medenine, the northernmost British strong point. The Axis attack was repulsed with massed artillery fire; 55 Axis tanks were knocked out. With the failure of Capri, Rommel decided that the only way to save the Axis armies would be to abandon the campaign, and on 9 March he travelled to Italy for discussions with Comando Supremo in Rome. Finding no support for his ideas, he travelled on 10 March to see Hitler at his headquarters in Ukraine, to try to convince him to abandon Tunisia and return the Axis armies to Europe. Hitler refused and Rommel was placed, in strict secrecy, on sick leave. Arnim became commander of Army Group Africa.

=== Battle of the Mareth Line ===
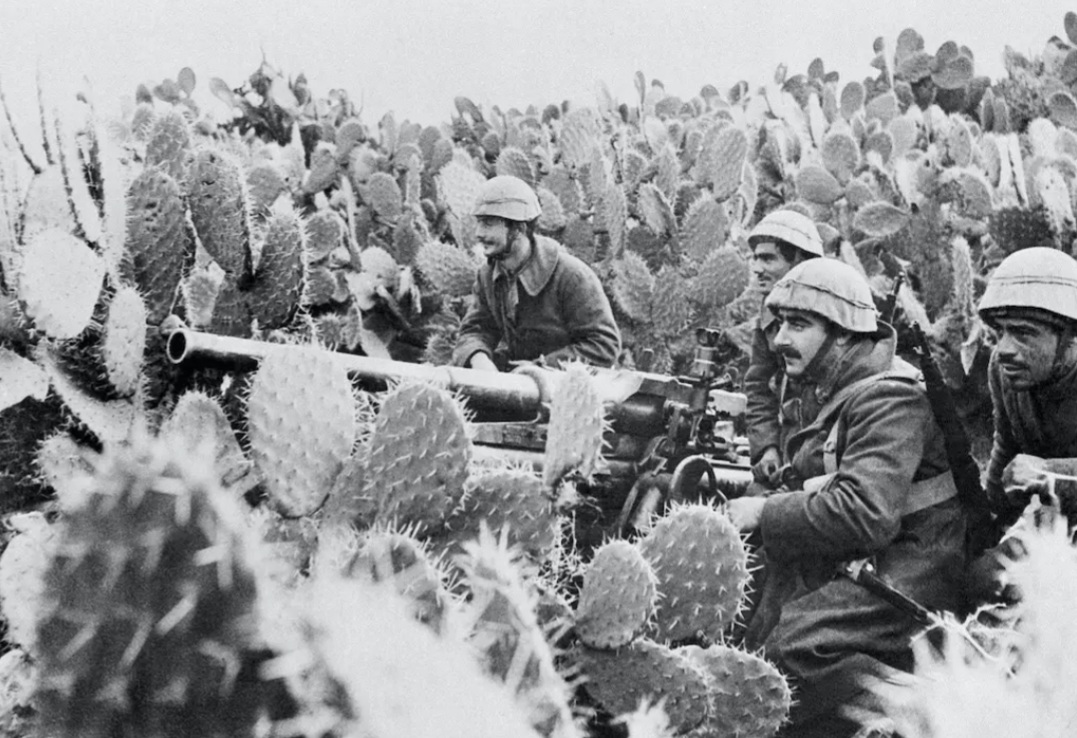
Italian troops in a cactus field in the Mareth Line, 31 March 1943

Montgomery launched Operation Pugilist against the Mareth Line on the night of 19/20 March 1943. XXX Corps of the Eighth Army commenced Operation Pugilist along with the 50th (Northumbrian) Infantry Division. They penetrated the 136th Armoured Division "Giovani Fascisti"-held line and established a small bridgehead west of Zarat on 20/21 March. The terrain and rain however prevented the deployment of tanks, aircraft and anti-tank guns, which left the infantry isolated. A determined counter-attack by 15th Panzer Division and the Giovani Fascisti Division on 22 March, recaptured much of the bridgehead. XXX Corps prepared a new attack towards Tallouf, in which the 4th Indian Infantry Division (Major-General Francis Tuker) was to make a night attack on 23/24 March, around the inland end of the line. This would coincide with the wide left hook manoeuvre Montgomery was planning with a new operation called "Supercharge II".

On 26 March, X Corps (Lieutenant-General Brian Horrocks) drove around the Matmata Hills, capturing the Tebaga Gap and the town of El Hamma at the northern extreme of the line in "Operation Supercharge II", making the Mareth Line untenable. The following day anti-tank guns from German and Italian units checked the advance of X Corps, to gain time for a withdrawal. In the next 48 hours the Axis defenders pulled out of the Mareth Line, establishing a new defensive position 60 kilometres (37 mi) to the north-west at Wadi Akarit near Gabès.

=== Gabès ===
The reorganised US II Corps advanced from the passes again and got behind the Axis lines; the 10th Panzer Division counter-attacked at the Battle of El Guettar on 23 March. The German tanks rolling up lead units of the US forces ran into a minefield, and US artillery and anti-tank units opened fire. The 10th Panzer Division rapidly lost 30 tanks and retreated out of the minefield. A second attack supported by infantry in the late afternoon was also repulsed, and the 10th Panzer Division retired to Gabès. The US II Corps was unable to exploit the German failure and each attack was stopped by the 10th Panzer Division or 21st Panzer Division counter-attacks up the road from Gabès; co-ordination of Allied air and ground forces remained unsatisfactory. The Eighth Army and the US II Corps attacked for the next week and on 28 March, the Eighth Army captured El Hamma, forcing the Axis to abandon Gabès and retreat north towards the Fifth Panzer Army. The hills in front of the US forces were abandoned, allowing them to join the British forces in Gabès later that day. The 2nd New Zealand Division and 1st Armoured Division pursued the Germans 225 km (140 mi) northwards into defensive positions in the hills west of Enfidaville, which were held until the end of the campaign.

== Northern sector ==
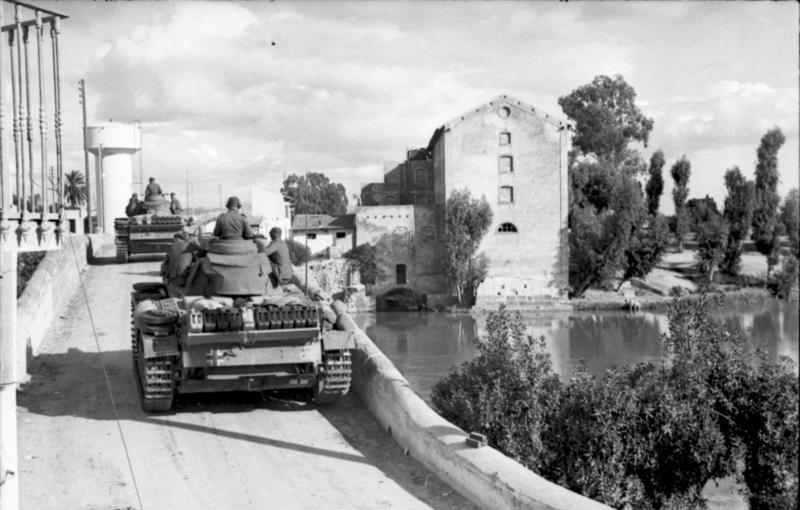
German Panzer III tanks advance through a Tunisian town

On 26 February, Arnim, in the mistaken belief that the Kasserine battles had forced the Allies to weaken the north to reinforce the south, launched Operation Ochsenkopf ("Ox Head") against V Corps, across a wide front and commanded by General Weber. The main attacks were by Corps Weber which had the 334th Infantry Division, newly arrived elements of the Hermann Göring Division and the part of the 10th Panzer Division not involved in Operation Frühlingswind ("Spring Wind"). Weber's force was to advance in three groups: a central group moving west toward Medjez el Bab; a second to the north advancing south-west, on the route from Mateur to Béja (which was some 40 km (25 mi) west of Medjez) and the third group pushing west 25 miles (40 km) south of Medjez. The northern flank of Weber's corps was to be protected by the Manteuffel Division (Note: Previously von Broich battlegroup, renamed after a change of command) advancing west (Operation Ausladung) and forcing the Allies out of their advanced positions opposite Green Hill and the Axis-held Jefna Station.

The aim of Operation Ausladung ("Outward thrust") was to gain control of the vital town of Djebel Abiod. This attack by the Manteuffel Division made good progress across the French-held, lightly defended hills between Cap Serrat and the railway town of Sedjenane. Costly counter-attacks on February 27 and 2 March by part of the 139th Infantry Brigade, 46th Infantry Division, No. 1 Commando and supporting artillery delayed the Axis advance. Withdrawals of French battalions in the Medjez area to join XIX Corps, left little opposition to the German occupation of the high ground dominating the town, which was left in a dangerous salient. As a result, Sedjenane was abandoned by the British on 4 March and the 139th Infantry Brigade was pushed slowly back over the next three weeks some 24 km (15 mi) toward Djebel Abiod.

=== Operation Ochsenkopf ===
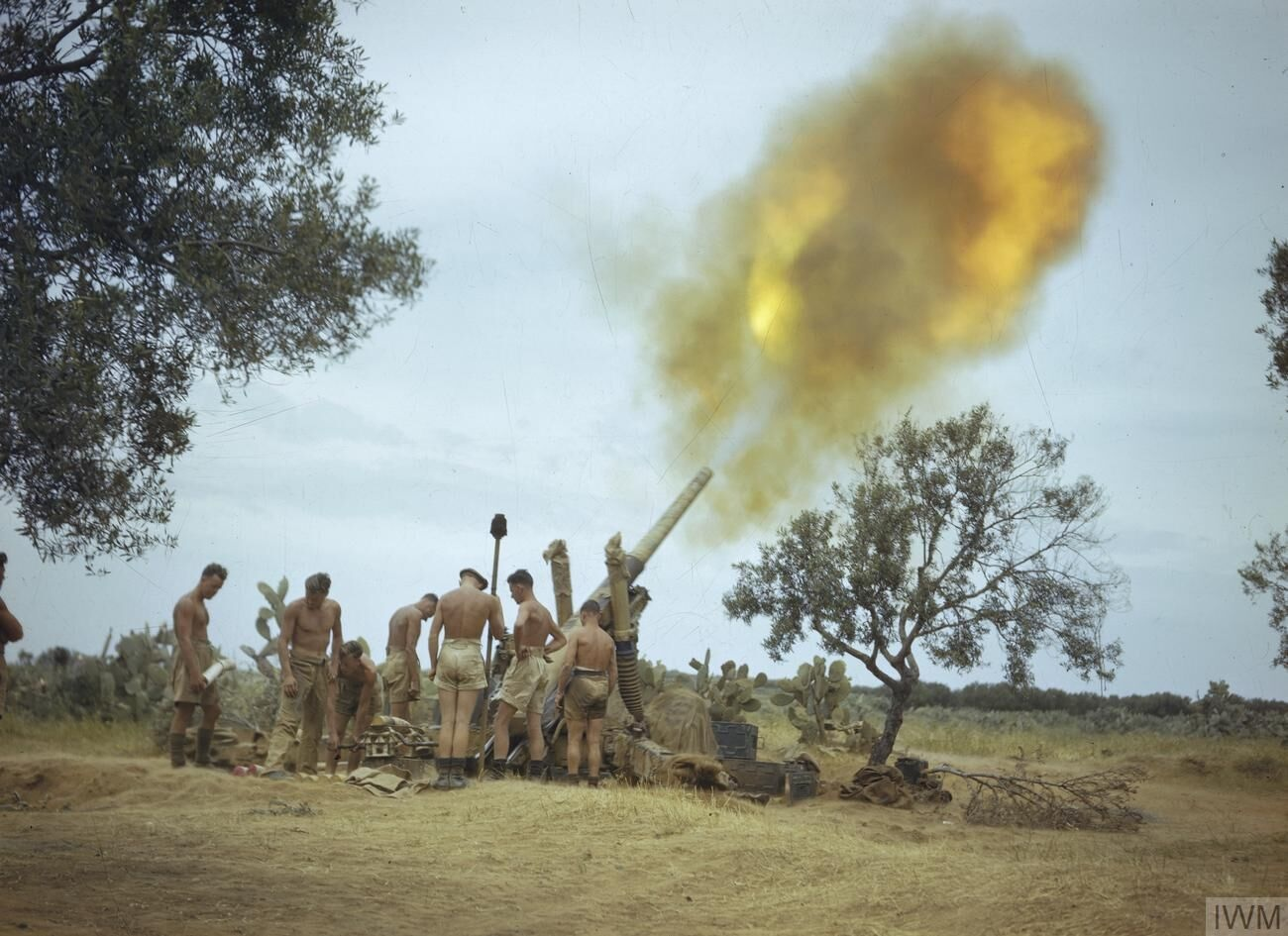
A British 4.5 inch medium gun firing on targets spotted by the RAF

The main offensive, Ochsenkopf led to fierce fighting - Kampfgruppe Lang attacking in the northern sector were held up by a small force of artillery and a battalion of the Hampshire Regiment for a whole day at Sidi Nsir and Hampshire Farm before they could be overcome. This delay was critical and as a result the British force was able to prepare a significant killing field at Hunts Gap (an area between Medjez and about 24 km (15 mi) north-east of Béja). In the Southern attack Kampfgruppe Audorff made some progress west toward Medjez el Bab but a British ad hoc force, Y Division, was able to repel the Southern attack; particularly after two Churchill tanks shot up an entire German transport column at a place called 'Steamroller' Farm. The final attack by Lang's battered force was stopped at Hunt's Gap by the 128th Infantry Brigade of the 46th Infantry Division with substantial artillery, RAF air cover and two squadrons of Churchill tanks from the North Irish Horse under command.

Fighting lasted until 5 March and in terrible weather conditions the operation was called off by Arnim. The failure had cost the Axis grievous losses in infantry as well as tanks, particularly the loss of many of the heavy Tiger Tanks. Ochsenkopf was to be the last major Axis offensive by the 5th Panzer Army. On 25 March, Alexander ordered a counter-attack on the V Corps front and on 28 March, Anderson attacked with the 46th Infantry Division, with the 138th Infantry Brigade, 128th Infantry Brigade in reserve and reinforced by the 36th Infantry Brigade, 1st Parachute Brigade and French units including a tabor of specialist mountain Goumiers, the artillery of two divisions plus more from army resources. In four days, it succeeded in recapturing all lost ground and took 850 German and Italian prisoners. On 7 April, Anderson tasked the 78th Infantry Division with clearing the Béja-Medjez road. Supported by artillery and close air support, they methodically advanced 16 km (10 mi) through difficult mountain terrain over the next ten days, clearing a front 16 km (10 mi) wide. The 4th Infantry Division joined the fighting, taking position on the left of the 78th Division and pushing toward Sidi Nsir.

== Allied victory ==
=== Allied plans ===
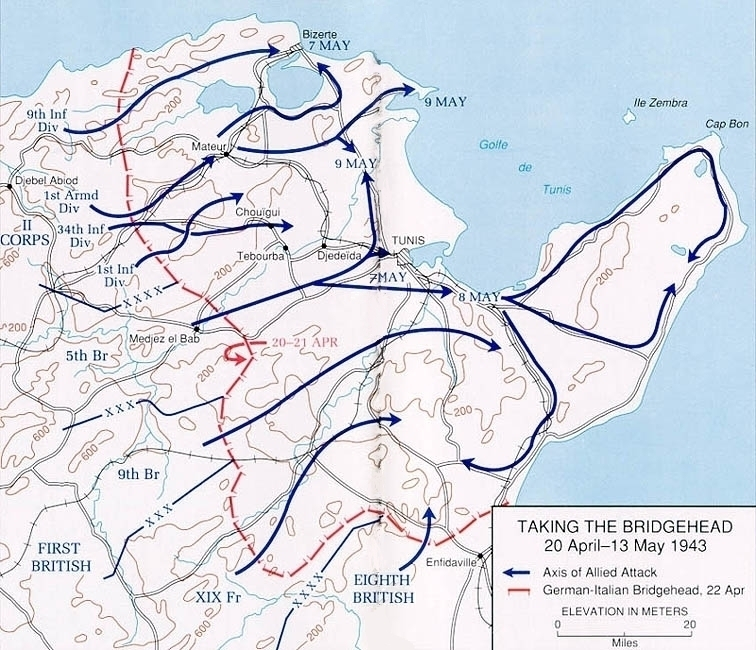
Tunisia Campaign operations, 20 April to 13 May 1943

The salient at Medjez had been relieved and lateral roads in the V Corps area cleared so that Anderson was able to turn his full attention to the orders he had received on 12 April from Alexander to prepare the large-scale attack, scheduled for 22 April, to gain Tunis. By this stage, Allied aircraft had been moved forward to airfields in Tunisia to prevent the aerial supply of Axis troops in North Africa (Operation Flax) and large numbers of German transport aircraft were shot down between Sicily and Tunis. British destroyers operating from Malta prevented marine supply, reinforcement or evacuation of Tunisia by sea (Operation Retribution). Admiral Cunningham, Eisenhower's Naval Task Force commander, issued Nelsonian orders to his ships: "Sink, burn, capture, destroy. Let nothing pass" but very few Axis ships even attempted passage. By 18 April, after attacks by Eighth Army from the south and flanking attacks by IX Corps and French XIX Corps, the Axis forces had been pushed into a defensive line on the north-east coast of Tunis, attempting to protect their supply lines but with little hope of continuing the battle for long.

Alexander planned that while II US Corps would attack on the north towards Bizerte, First Army would attack towards Tunis while Eighth Army attacked north from Enfidaville. Anderson would co-ordinate the actions of First Army and II US Corps, issuing the appropriate orders to achieve this. Anderson's plan was for the main attack to be in the centre of the V Corps front at Medjez, confronting main Axis defences. However, IX Corps on the right would first attack north-east with, by speed of movement, the intention of getting in behind the Medjez position and disrupting their armoured reserves. II US Corps would make a double thrust: one to capture the high ground on V Corps' left flank and a second toward Bizerte. French XIX Corps would be held back until IX Corps and Eighth Army had drawn in the opposition and then advance toward Pont du Fahs.

=== Operation Vulcan ===
The Allied forces had reorganised and during the night of 19/20 April, the Eighth Army captured Enfidaville against the Italian 16th Motorized Division "Pistoia", which counter-attacked several times over the next three days and was repulsed and the action at Takrouna also took place. The northward advance of Eighth Army had "pinched out" US II Corps' eastward facing front line, allowing the corps to be withdrawn and switched to the northern end of the Allied front. Arnim knew that an Allied offensive was imminent and launched a spoiling attack on the night of 20/21 April, between Medjez and Goubellat on the IX Corps front. The Hermann Göring Division supported by tanks from 10th Panzer Division penetrated up to 5 miles (8.0 km) at some points but could not force a general withdrawal and eventually returned to their lines. No serious disruption was caused to Allied plans, except that the first attack of the offensive, by IX Corps, was delayed by four hours from 4:00 a.m. on 22 April.

On the morning of 22 April, the 46th Division attacked on the IX Corps front, creating a gap for the 6th Armoured Division to pass through by nightfall, followed by 1st Armoured Division, striking east for the next two days but not quick enough to forestall the creation of a strong anti-tank screen which halted their progress. The battle had drawn the Axis reserves of armour south, away from the central front. Seeing that no further progress was likely, Anderson withdrew the 6th Armoured Division and most of the 46th Infantry Division into army reserve. The V Corps attack began on the evening of 22 April and the US II Corps launched their offensive in the early hours of 23 April in the Battle of Hill 609, in which the hill was captured, which opened the way to Bizerte. In grim hand-to hand fighting against the Hermann Göring Division, 334th Infantry and 15th Panzer Divisions, it took V Corps with the 1st, 4th and 78th Infantry Divisions, supported by army tanks and heavy artillery concentrations, eight days to penetrate 9.7 km (6 mi) and capture most of the Axis defensive positions.

The fighting was mutually costly but in the Battle of Longstop Hill, Longstop was captured, which opened the way to Tunis and Anderson felt a breakthrough was imminent. On 30 April, after a failed attempt by the 169th Infantry Brigade of the recently arrived 56th (London) Infantry Division, which had just arrived over 3,300 miles from Syria, it had become clear to both Montgomery and Alexander that an Eighth Army attack north from Enfidaville, into strongly-held and difficult terrain, would not succeed. General Alexander gave Montgomery a holding task and transferred the British 7th Armoured Division, the 4th Indian Infantry Division and the 201st Guards Motor Brigade from the Eighth Army to the First Army, joining the British 1st Armoured Division which had been transferred before the main offensive Operation Strike.

=== Operation Strike ===
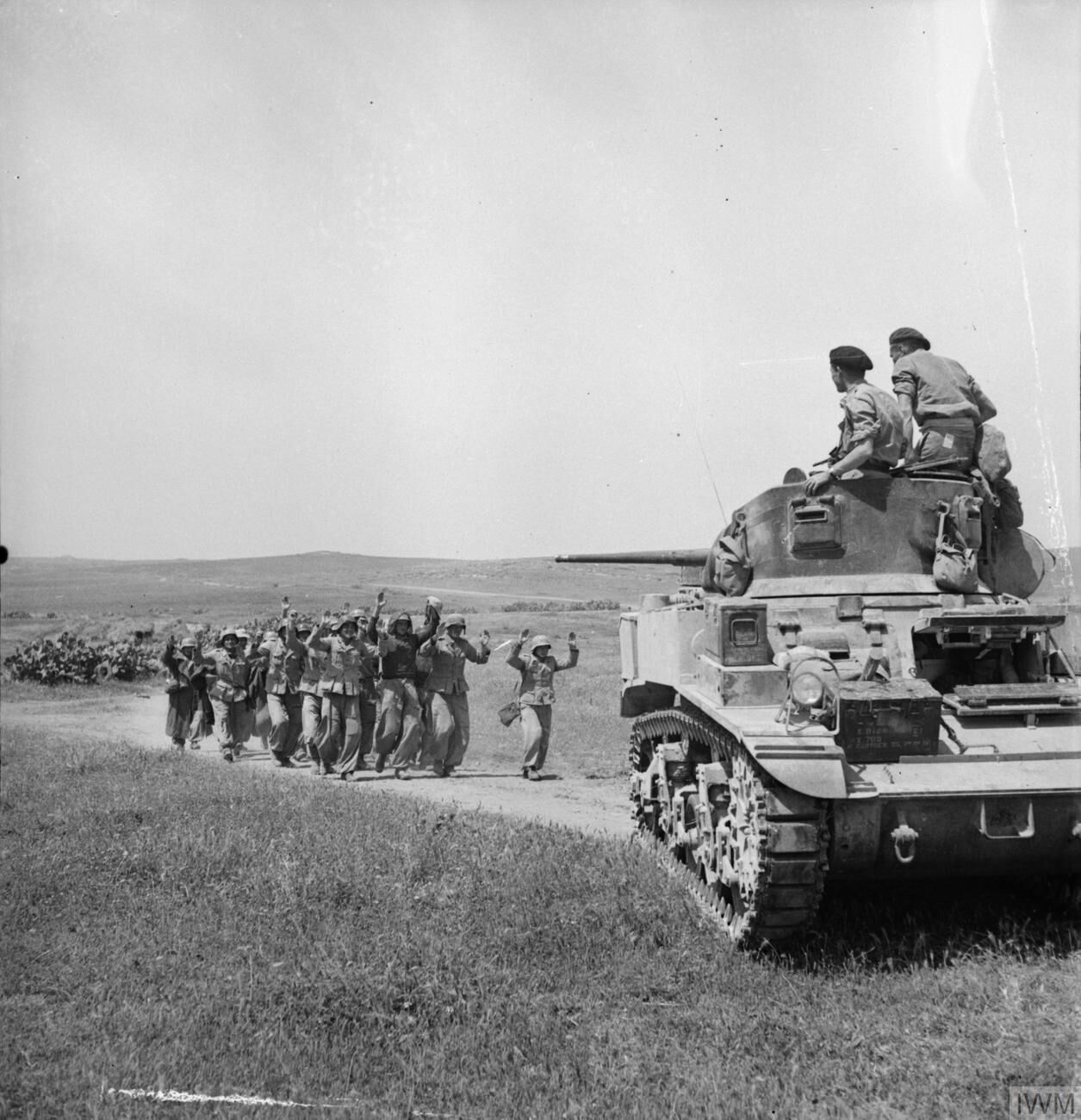
German troops surrender to British crew of a Stuart tank near Frendj, 6 May 1943.

Allied redeployments were complete by the night of 5 May; Anderson had arranged for a dummy concentration of tanks near Bou Arada on the IX Corps front, to deflect attention from the arrival of the 7th Armoured Division in the Medjez sector and achieved a considerable measure of surprise as to the size of the armoured force when the attack began. The final assault was launched at 3:30 a.m. on 6 May by IX Corps, commanded by Lieutenant-General Brian Horrocks who had taken over from Lieutenant-General John Crocker, who had been wounded. V Corps, under Lieutenant-General Charles Walter Allfrey, had made a preliminary attack on 5 May, to capture high ground and secure the left flank of IX Corps. The 4th British and 4th Indian Divisions, concentrated on a narrow front and supported by heavy artillery concentrations, broke a hole in the defences for the 6th and 7th Armoured divisions to pass through. On 7 May, British armour entered Tunis and American infantry from II Corps, which had continued its advance in the north, entered Bizerte.

=== Axis surrender ===
Six days after the fall of Tunis and Bizerte, the last Axis resistance in Africa ended with the surrender of over 170,000 Germans and Italians who became prisoners of war (POWs). Major General Lucian Truscott, commander of the US 3rd Infantry Division and Major General Ernest N. Harmon, commander of the US 1st Armored Division, reported that German resistance in the American sector ceased on 6 May and German troops started surrendering en masse. On 8 May, the 334th Division surrendered to the British forces between Mateur and Tebourba. At 10:00 a.m. on 9 May, the US II Corps, under Major General Omar Bradley, cornered Major-General Gustav von Vaerst and what remained of the 5th Panzer Army, which surrendered before noon. At least 12,000 Germans surrendered in Major-General Fritz Krause's sector (of the initial batch of 25,000 prisoners, fewer than 400 were Italian). Around 22,000 Germans in the mountainous Zaghouan sector also ceased fighting on 11 May and surrendered with their equipment to the Free French.

British and Commonwealth forces reported 150,000 Axis POWs taken in the German-held sector from 5 May – 12 June. Major-General Count Theodor von Sponeck, commander of the 90th Light Division, had surrendered unconditionally to the 2nd New Zealand Division, after threatening to fight till the last round. Arnim surrendered to the Royal Sussex Regiment. Messe, commander of the 1st Army, held the line north of Takrouna and on 12 May, cabled Comando Supremo vowing to fight on; at 7:55 p.m. that evening, after the German collapse, Mussolini ordered Messe to surrender. Next day, the 1st Army was still holding opposite Enfidaville but the remaining 80,000 men were surrounded; the RAF and artillery continued their bombardment and around noon, the 1st Army surrendered to the Eighth Army. Messe along with Kurt Freiherr von Liebenstein formally surrendered to British and New Zealand forces under General Bernard Freyberg.

== Aftermath ==
=== Analysis ===
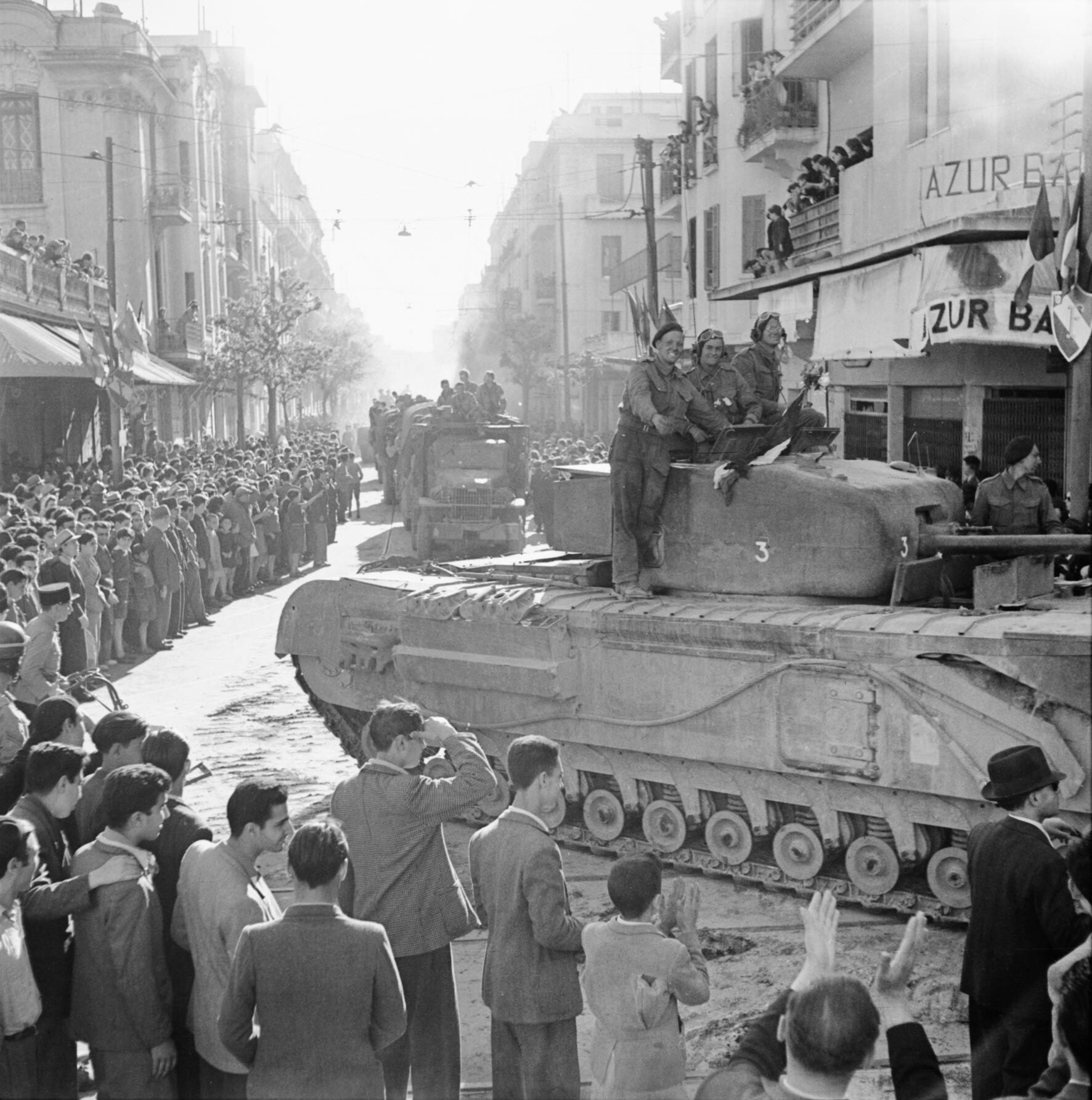
Churchill tank moves through Tunis during the liberation, 8 May 1943

In 1966, the British Official Historian I. S. O. Playfair wrote that

Had the Allies been able to get a tighter stranglehold on the Axis communications immediately after the 'Torch' landings, they might have won the gamble of the Tunisian Campaign by the end of 1942 and victory in Africa as a whole might have been close. Conversely, the Axis might have staved off for a long time their defeat in May 1943 had their forces received the supplies they needed.

— Playfair

In 1995 American historian Williamson Murray was more critical of the Axis' strategical decisions:

The decision to reinforce North Africa was one of the worst of Hitler's blunders: admittedly, it kept the Mediterranean closed for six more months, with a negative impact on the Allied shipping situation but it placed some of Germany's best troops in an indefensible position from which, like Stalingrad, there would be no escape. Moreover, Hitler committed the Luftwaffe to fight a battle of attrition under unfavourable conditions and it suffered losses that it could not afford.

— Williamson Murray

The Axis gamble failed, and at the cost of heavy losses in men and materiel had only slowed the inevitable. The Allied gains were considerable; control of the North African littoral, and the Mediterranean open to traffic. Even the US defeat at Kasserine may have been paradoxically advantageous; Rommel and the Axis were lulled into a false impression of US capabilities, while the Americans learned valuable lessons, and made positive changes in their command structure and tactics. With North Africa in Allied hands, plans quickly turned to the invasion of Sicily and Italy. Joseph Goebbels wrote that it was on the same scale as the defeat in the Battle of Stalingrad; Tunisgrad was coined for the defeat. The historian Gerhard Schreiber writes that "it seems no exaggeration to say that—in purely quantitative terms—Tunisia was a second Stalingrad for the invaders".

A Victory March was held in Tunis on May 20, 1943, in which units of the First and Eighth Armies and representative detachments of the American and French forces marched past, with bands playing and generals Eisenhower, Alexander and Giraud taking the salute.

=== Casualties ===
==== Allied ====
Allied casualties of 76,020 include the losses incurred by the First Army from 8 November 1942 and the Eighth Army from 9 February 1943. British and Commonwealth casualties amounted to 38,360 men; 6,233 were killed, 21,528 were wounded and 10,599 reported missing. The Free French suffered 19,439 casualties; 2,156 killed, 10,276 wounded and 7,007 missing. American casualties amounted to 18,221 men; 2,715 killed, 8,978 wounded and 6,528 missing.

From 22 to 30 November 1942, the RAF flew 1,710 sorties and lost at least 45 aircraft. The USAAF flew 180 sorties and lost at least 7 aeroplanes. From 1 to 12 December, the RAF flew 2,225 sorties and lost a minimum of 37 aircraft. The USAAF flew 523 sorties and lost another 17 aircraft. From 13 to 26 December, the RAF flew 1,940 sorties for a loss of at least 20 aeroplanes while the USAAF conducted 720 sorties for a loss of 16 aircraft. From 27 December 1942 to 17 January 1943 the RAF flew 3,160 sorties and lost 38 aircraft while the USAAF flew an estimated 3,200 sorties and lost 36 aeroplanes. From 18 January to 13 February the RAF flew 5,000 sorties, excluding those against shipping, for the loss of 34 aircraft while the USAAF flew an estimated 6,250 sorties for the loss of 85. During the remainder of February to 28 March, 156 allied planes were lost. Between 29 March and 21 April, 203 Allied aircraft were destroyed. From 22 April to the end of the campaign, 45 bombers and 110 fighters were lost; 12 bombers and 47 fighters of the RAF, the USAAF losing 32 bombers and 63 fighters, while the French lost 1 bomber.

==== Axis ====
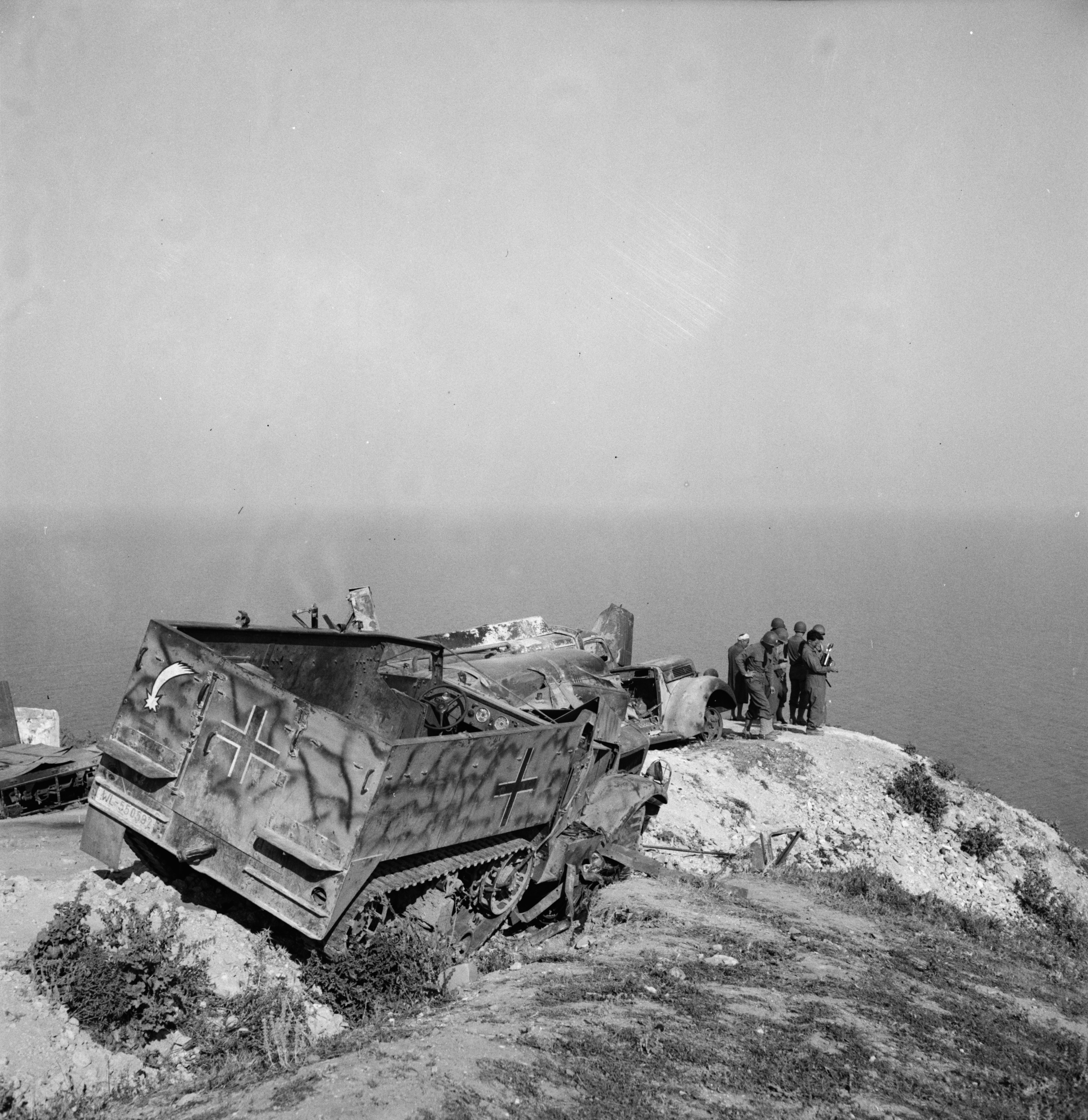
US troops with abandoned German equipment including a captured American M3 half-track May 1943

The Axis armies suffered casualties of 170,000 to 180,000 men; the losses are uncertain but it is estimated that the German army suffered 8,500 men killed during the campaign and the Italians 3,700 men killed; another 40,000 to 50,000 Axis soldiers were wounded. In the British official history, Playfair wrote that the Allies took 238,243 unwounded prisoners; 101,784 German, 89,442 Italian and 47,017 others. In 2004, Rick Atkinson wrote that a quarter of a million prisoners is a reasonable estimate. Playfair wrote that G. F. Howe, the American official historian, recorded the capture of 275,000 Axis soldiers, an 18th Army Group calculation of 244,500 prisoners (including 157,000 Germans), that Rommel estimated 130,000 Germans were taken prisoner and Arnim estimated 100,000 German and 200,000 Italian prisoners of war. There seems to be a distinction between the entire campaign and the last few weeks when the majority of the Axis forces were captured.

The Luftwaffe lost 2,422+ aircraft in the Mediterranean theatre from November 1942 – May 1943 (41 per cent of the Luftwaffe). At least 1,045 aircraft were destroyed; from 22 to 30 November 1942, the Luftwaffe flew 1,084 sorties losing 63 aircraft, including 21 destroyed on the ground. The Regia Aeronautica recorded the loss of four. From 1 to 12 December, the Luftwaffe flew 1,000 sorties and lost 37 aircraft, including nine on the ground, while the Italians recorded the loss of ten more. From 13 to 26 December, the Luftwaffe flew 1,030 sorties and lost 17 aircraft, while the Italians lost three. From 27 December 1942 to 17 January 1943, the Luftwaffe lost 47 aeroplanes; Regia Aeronautica losses are unknown. From 18 January to 13 February, the Luftwaffe lost another 100 aircraft but Italian losses are unknown. From 14 February to 28 March, 136 German aeroplanes were lost and the Regia Aeronautica lost 22 more. From 29 March to 21 April, 270 Luftwaffe aeroplanes were destroyed and 46 "operational aircraft and almost their entire remaining air transport fleet" was lost. From 22 April until the end, the Luftwaffe lost 273 aircraft; 42 bombers, 166 fighters, 52 transport aircraft, 13 Storch observation aircraft and the Italians recorded the loss of 17 aeroplanes; 600+ aircraft were captured by the Allies.

== See also ==
- List of British military equipment of World War II
- List of equipment of the United States Army during World War II
- List of French military equipment of World War II
- List of German military equipment of World War II
- List of Italian Army equipment in World War II
- Tunisian Victory
- List of World War II Battles
- Military history of Italy during World War II
- Panzer Army Africa
- Italian Service Units
- US Naval Bases North Africa
