= List of Knight's Cross of the Iron Cross recipients (T) =

The Knight's Cross of the Iron Cross (German: Ritterkreuz des Eisernen Kreuzes) and its variants were the highest awards in the military and paramilitary forces of Nazi Germany during World War II. The Knight's Cross of the Iron Cross was awarded for a wide range of reasons and across all ranks, from a senior commander for skilled leadership of his troops in battle to a low-ranking soldier for a single act of extreme gallantry. A total of 7,321 awards were made between its first presentation on 30 September 1939 and its last bestowal on 17 June 1945. (Note: Großadmiral and President of Germany Karl Dönitz, Hitler's successor as Head of State (Staatsoberhaupt) and Supreme Commander of the Armed Forces, had ordered the cessation of all promotions and awards as of 11 May 1945 (Dönitz-decree). Consequently the last Knight's Cross awarded to Oberleutnant zur See of the Reserves Georg-Wolfgang Feller on 17 June 1945 must therefore be considered a de facto but not de jure hand-out.) This number is based on the analysis and acceptance of the order commission of the Association of Knight's Cross Recipients (AKCR). Presentations were made to members of the three military branches of the Wehrmacht—the Heer (Army), Kriegsmarine (Navy) and Luftwaffe (Air Force)—as well as the Waffen-SS, the Reichsarbeitsdienst (RAD—Reich Labour Service) and the Volkssturm (German national militia). There were also 43 recipients in the military forces of allies of the Third Reich.

These recipients are listed in the 1986 edition of Walther-Peer Fellgiebel's book, Die Träger des Ritterkreuzes des Eisernen Kreuzes 1939–1945 [The Bearers of the Knight's Cross of the Iron Cross 1939–1945]. Fellgiebel was the former chairman and head of the order commission of the AKCR. In 1996, the second edition of this book was published with an addendum delisting 11 of these original recipients. Author Veit Scherzer has cast doubt on a further 193 of these listings. The majority of the disputed recipients had been nominated for the award in 1945, when the deteriorating situation of Germany during the final days of World War II left a number of nominations incomplete and pending in various stages of the approval process.

Listed here are the 182 Knight's Cross recipients whose last name starts with "T". While Veit Scherzer has challenged the validity of 5 of these listings, he has also pointed out that the AKCR failed to identify Hans Turnwal as a potential recipient. The recipients are ordered alphabetically by last name. The rank listed is the recipient's rank at the time the Knight's Cross was awarded.

== Background ==
The Knight's Cross of the Iron Cross and its higher grades were based on four separate enactments. The first enactment, Reichsgesetzblatt I S. 1573 of 1 September 1939 instituted the Iron Cross (Eisernes Kreuz), the Knight's Cross of the Iron Cross and the Grand Cross of the Iron Cross (Großkreuz des Eisernen Kreuzes). Article 2 of the enactment mandated that the award of a higher class be preceded by the award of all preceding classes. As the war progressed, some of the recipients of the Knight's Cross distinguished themselves further and a higher grade, the Knight's Cross of the Iron Cross with Oak Leaves (Ritterkreuz des Eisernen Kreuzes mit Eichenlaub), was instituted. The Oak Leaves, as they were commonly referred to, were based on the enactment Reichsgesetzblatt I S. 849 of 3 June 1940. In 1941, two higher grades of the Knight's Cross were instituted. The enactment Reichsgesetzblatt I S. 613 of 28 September 1941 introduced the Knight's Cross of the Iron Cross with Oak Leaves and Swords (Ritterkreuz des Eisernen Kreuzes mit Eichenlaub und Schwertern) and the Knight's Cross of the Iron Cross with Oak Leaves, Swords and Diamonds (Ritterkreuz des Eisernen Kreuzes mit Eichenlaub, Schwertern und Brillanten). At the end of 1944 the final grade, the Knight's Cross of the Iron Cross with Golden Oak Leaves, Swords, and Diamonds (Ritterkreuz des Eisernen Kreuzes mit goldenem Eichenlaub, Schwertern und Brillanten), based on the enactment Reichsgesetzblatt 1945 I S. 11 of 29 December 1944, became the final variant of the Knight's Cross authorized.

== Recipients ==
Knight's Cross of the Iron Cross (T)
Service	Number of presentations	Posthumous presentations
Heer (incl. Volkssturm)	112	12
Kriegsmarine	14	3
Luftwaffe	47	5
Waffen-SS	9	0

The Oberkommando der Wehrmacht (Supreme Command of the Armed Forces) kept separate Knight's Cross lists for the Heer (Army), Kriegsmarine (Navy), Luftwaffe (Air Force), and Waffen-SS. Within each of these lists a unique sequential number was assigned to each recipient. The same numbering paradigm was applied to the higher grades of the Knight's Cross, one list per grade. Of the 182 awards made to servicemen whose last name starts with "T", 19 were later awarded the Knight's Cross of the Iron Cross with Oak Leaves, two the Knight's Cross of the Iron Cross with Oak Leaves and Swords and one the Knight's Cross of the Iron Cross with Oak Leaves, Swords and Diamonds; 20 presentations were made posthumously. Heer members received 112 of the medals, including the award given to Volkssturmmann Ernst Tiburzy. A further 14 presentations were given to the Kriegsmarine, 47 to the Luftwaffe, and 9 to the Waffen-SS. The sequential numbers greater than 843 for the Knight's Cross of the Iron Cross with Oak Leaves and 143 for the Knight's Cross of the Iron Cross with Oak Leaves and Swords are unofficial and were assigned by the Association of Knight's Cross Recipients (AKCR) and are therefore denoted in parentheses.

This along with the + (plus) indicates that a higher grade of Knight's Cross was awarded as well.
This along with the * (asterisk) indicates that the Knight's Cross was awarded posthumously.
This along with the ? (question mark) indicates that author Veit Scherzer has expressed doubt regarding the veracity and formal correctness of the listing.

Name	Service	Rank	Role and unit (Note: For an explanation of the various naming schemes used by the Luftwaffe, Heer, Kriegsmarine and Waffen-SS refer to nomenclature used by the Wehrmacht and Waffen-SS.)	Date of award	Notes	Image
Franz Tabel	Heer	Feldwebel	Zugführer (platoon leader) in the 3./Pionier-Bataillon 246	25 January 1945	—	—
Fritz Tadje	Heer	Leutnant	Leader of the 2./Sturmgeschütz-Brigade 190	21 October 1942	—	—
Erich Taeger	Luftwaffe	Oberleutnant	Staffelkapitän of the 7./Kampfgeschwader 1 "Hindenburg"	2 October 1942	—	—
Hermann Tanczos	Heer	Unteroffizier	In the 4./Artillerie-Regiment 157	21 February 1944	—	—
Otto Tange	Luftwaffe	Oberfeldwebel	Pilot in the 4./Jagdgeschwader 51 "Mölders"	19 March 1942	—	—
Walter Tank	Heer	Oberleutnant of the Reserves	Chief of the 6./Panzergrenadier-Regiment 3	24 September 1942	—	—
Willi Tanneberger	Heer	Oberfeldwebel	Company troop leader in the 3./Grenadier-Regiment 156 (motorized)	10 February 1944	—	—
Karl Tannert	Luftwaffe	Hauptmann	Commander of the III./Fallschirmjäger-Regiment 2	5 April 1944	—	—
Kurt Tanzer	Luftwaffe	Oberfeldwebel	Pilot in the 12./Jagdgeschwader 51 "Mölders"	5 December 1943	—	—
Martin Tappe	Waffen-SS	SS-Obersturmbannführer	Commander of the II./SS-Polizei-Panzergrenadier-Regiment 8	28 March 1945	—	—
Walter Tarin	Heer	Major	Leader of Artillerie-Regiment 121	20 October 1944	—	—
Richard Taubert	Luftwaffe	Hauptmann	Staffelkapitän of the 5.(F)/Aufklärungs-Gruppe 122 (Note: According to Scherzer as Staffelkapitän of the Aufklärungsstaffel 5.(F)/122.)	16 November 1942	—	—
Arno Taulien	Heer	Oberleutnant	Chief of the 7./Panzer-Regiment 6	18 October 1943	—	—
Harry Tech	Heer	Hauptmann of the Reserves	Commander of Heeres-Artillerie-Abteilung 934 (motorized) (Note: According to Scherzer as commander of leichte (light) Artillerie-Abteilung 934 (motorized).)	3 March 1943	—	—
Fritz Tegtmeier	Luftwaffe	Oberfeldwebel	Pilot in the 2./Jagdgeschwader 54 (Note: According to Scherzer on 26 March 1944 as pilot in the 1./Jagdgeschwader 54.)	28 March 1944	—	—
Max-Martin Teichert	Kriegsmarine	Kapitänleutnant	Commander of U-456	19 December 1943*	Killed in action 12 May 1943	—
Friedrich Teichmann	Heer	Leutnant (Note: According to Scherzer as Leutnant of the Reserves.)	Zugführer (platoon leader) in Regiments-Nachrichten-Zug/Grenadier-Regiment 712	24 February 1945*	Killed in action 20 January 1945	—
Waldemar Teige	Luftwaffe	Oberfeldwebel	Pilot in the 6./Kampfgeschwader 53	7 June 1942	—	
Eberhard Telkamp	Waffen-SS	SS-Sturmbannführer	Commander of the II./SS-Panzer-Regiment 9 "Hohenstaufen" (Note: According to Scherzer as commander of the II./SS-Panzer-Regiment 9.)	23 August 1944	—	—
Heinrich Telkemeyer	Heer	Hauptmann of the Reserves	Commander of the IV./Artillerie-Regiment 172	28 October 1944	—	—
Eugen Tellgmann	Kriegsmarine	Oberleutnant zur See of the Reserves	Commander of Vorpostenboot VP-1313 in the 13. Vorpostenflottille	5 October 1944	—	—
Ernst Telschig	Heer	Major of the Reserves	Commander of Pionier-Bataillon 187	8 August 1944	—	—
Hans Temming	Kriegsmarine	Kapitänleutnant	Commander of Torpedoboot T-28	10 May 1945 (Note: According to Scherzer on 6 May 1945.)	—	—
Carl de Temple	Heer	Oberstleutnant	Commander of Füsilier-Regiment 230	26 June 1944	—	—
Hans Tenner	Heer	Hauptmann	Chief of the 1./Grenadier-Regiment 487	24 April 1943*	Killed in action 29 March 1943	—
Werner Tennhardt	Heer	Oberleutnant	Adjutant of Infanterie-Regiment 446	13 October 1941*	Killed in action 11 October 1941	—
Günther Tenschert? (Note: No evidence of the award can be found in the German Federal Archives. Günther Tenschert is not listed in either releases of Von Seemen's of "Die Ritterkreuzträger 1939–1945—The Knight's Cross Bearers 1939–1945". The order commission of the Association of Knight's Cross Recipients (AKCR) processed Tenschert's case in 1981. It is not known what evidence was presented to support his case. Scherzer was denied access to files, which could help clarify the case, of the AKCR on the grounds of the Bundesarchivgesetz (German Archive Law). The order commission of the AKCR decided: "Knight's Cross yes, 28 April 1945". Tenschert was a member of the AKCR.)	Heer	Major	Commander of the II./Festungs-Regiment Mohr (fortress Breslau)	28 April 1945	—	—
Heinrich Terharen	Heer	Leutnant of the Reserves	Leader of the 5./Grenadier-Regiment 956	9 December 1944	—	—
Heinrich Teriete	Heer	Leutnant	Zugführer (platoon leader) in the schwere Panzer-Jäger-Abteilung 653	22 July 1943	—	—
Hermann Tesch	Heer	Leutnant of the Reserves	Leader of the 11./Grenadier-Regiment 67	9 June 1944	—	—
Karl-Heinz Tesch	Heer	Stabsgefreiter	Deputy group leader in the 7./Panzergrenadier-Regiment 26	27 July 1944	—	—
Georg Teske	Luftwaffe	Major	Gruppenkommandeur of the I./Kampfgeschwader 26	31 October 1944	—	—
Rudi Tessenow? (Note: Rudolf Tessenow' first nomination by the corps was either not forwarded for further approvals or lost due to the military situation. A second nomination had been made after the evacuation of East Prussia, after the capitulation. This nomination was not processed. The presentation date was assigned by Walther-Peer Fellgiebel.)	Heer	Wachtmeister	In the 11./Panzer-Regiment 24	11 May 1945	—	—
Ernst Tetsch	Waffen-SS	SS-Sturmbannführer	Commander of the I./SS-Panzer-Regiment 10 "Frundsberg" (Note: According to Scherzer as commander of the I./SS-Panzer-Regiment 10.)	28 March 1945	—	
Hans von Tettau+	Heer	Generalleutnant	Commander of the 24. Infanterie-Division	3 September 1942	Awarded 821st Oak Leaves 5 April 1945	—
Heinz Teubel	Heer	Leutnant of the Reserves	Leader of the 2./Grenadier-Regiment 546	30 September 1944	—	—
Alfred Teumer	Luftwaffe	Oberleutnant	Staffelkapitän of the 7./Jagdgeschwader 54 (Note: According to Scherzer as Staffelkapitän in the III./Jagdgeschwader 54.)	19 August 1944	—	—
Hans Teusen	Luftwaffe	Leutnant	Zugführer (platoon leader) in the 6./Fallschirmjäger-Regiment 2	14 June 1941	—	—
Adolf Teuwsen	Heer	Obergefreiter	Machine gunner in the 3./Jäger-Regiment 25 (L)	14 May 1944	—	—
Andreas Thaler	Heer	Hauptmann	Leader of the II./Panzer-Regiment 25 (Note: According to Scherzer as company chief in the II./Panzer-Regiment 25.)	13 January 1944	—	—
Johann Thaler	Waffen-SS	SS-Unterscharführer	Panzer driver in the 6./SS-Panzer-Regiment 2 "Das Reich" (Note: According to Scherzer as Panzer driver in the 6./SS-Panzer-Regiment 2.)	14 August 1943	—	—
Rudolf Thaler	Heer	Oberjäger	Group leader in the 13./Gebirgsjäger-Regiment 13	9 December 1944	—	—
Hans Theilen	Heer	Leutnant	In the 2./Heeres-Küsten-Artillerie-Abteilung 289	22 April 1943	—	—
Heinrich Theilen	Heer	Obergefreiter	Group leader in the 6./Panzergrenadier-Regiment 2	4 August 1943	—	—
Franz Theissig	Heer	Unteroffizier	Group leader in the 13./Grenadier-Regiment 32	14 April 1945	—	—
Johann Thelen	Heer	Oberwachtmeister	Battery officer in the 5./Artillerie-Regiment 253	3 November 1944	—	—
Armin Thiede	Luftwaffe	Leutnant	Pilot in the 7./Sturzkampfgeschwader 2 "Immelmann"	14 June 1941	—	—
Edwin Thiel	Luftwaffe	Oberleutnant	Staffelführer of the 2./Jagdgeschwader 51 "Mölders" (Note: According to Scherzer as Staffelkapitän of the 2./Jagdgeschwader 51 "Mölders".)	16 April 1943	—	—
Erich Thiel	Luftwaffe	Oberleutnant	Staffelkapitän of the 7./Kampfgeschwader 27 "Boelcke"	23 July 1941	—	—
Franz Thiel	Heer	Oberfeldwebel	Zugführer (platoon leader) in the 7./Füsilier-Regiment 22	11 March 1945*	Killed in action 14 January 1945	—
Gerhard Thiel	Heer	Rittmeister	Leader of the III./Panzer-Regiment 24	20 January 1943	—	—
Karl Thiel	Heer	Unteroffizier	Gun leader of the 1./Artillerie-Regiment 217	8 August 1944	—	—
Arno Thiele	Heer	Oberleutnant (Note: According to Scherzer as Leutnant.)	Zugführer (platoon leader) of the 4./Panzer-Regiment 29	24 September 1942*	Died of wounds 3 August 1942	—
August Thiele+	Kriegsmarine	Kapitän zur See	Commander of heavy cruiser "Lützow"	18 January 1941	Awarded 824th Oak Leaves 8 April 1945	
Egon Thiem	Luftwaffe	Hauptmann	Staffelkapitän of the 5.(S)/Lehrgeschwader 2	21 July 1940	—	—
Ernst Thiem	Heer	Oberwachtmeister	Zugführer (platoon leader) in the 1./Aufklärungs-Abteilung 298	17 September 1941	—	—
Karl Thieme+	Heer	Hauptmann	Commander of the I./Panzergrenadier-Regiment 110	30 October 1943	Awarded 627th Oak Leaves 23 October 1944 (156th) Swords 9 May 1945? (Note: Karl Thieme's nomination from his unit was received by the Heerespersonalamt (HPA—Army Personnel Office) on 10 April 1945 via teleprinter. Major Joachim Domaschk noted "By no means sufficient! Requesting statement from OB West", which was requested on 13 April. OB West responded on 24 April (entry date at the Heerespersonalamt on 28 April): "Statement from OB West not possible, since nomination was not made via OB West". Major Domaschk then decided on 28 April: "Heeresgruppe B, postpone!" In this instance the nomination was not processed due to AHA 44 Ziff. 572 but also because statements from his commanding officers could not be obtained anymore due to the capitulation. The nomination list for the higher grades of the Knight's Cross of the Iron Cross also contains a note from 10 April 1945: postponed. A bestowal thus did not occur. The Association of Knight's Cross Recipients (AKCR) claims that the award was presented in accordance with the Dönitz-decree. This is illegal according to the Deutsche Dienststelle (WASt) and lacks legal justification. The sequential number "156" was assigned by the AKCR. Fellgiebel assigned the presentation date.)	—
Heinz Thieme	Heer	Obergefreiter	Richtschütze (gunner) in the 14.(Panzerjäger)/Grenadier-Regiment 446 (Note: According to Scherzer as Richtschütze (gunner) in the 14./Grenadier-Regiment 446.)	20 January 1944*	Died of wounds 17 December 1943	—
Helmut Thierfelder	Heer	Oberfeldwebel	Zugführer (platoon leader) in the 6./Panzergrenadier-Regiment 33	2 September 1944	—	—
Werner Thierfelder	Luftwaffe	Oberleutnant (Note: According to Scherzer as Oberleutnant of the Reserves and pilot in the I./Zerstörergeschwader 26 "Horst Wessel".)	Staffelkapitän in the II./Zerstörergeschwader 26 "Horst Wessel"	10 December 1941	—	—
Hans Thiessen? (Note: Hans Thiessen's nomination by the troop was received by the Heerespersonalamt (HPA—Army Staff Office) on 19 April 1945 and listed in the book "Verliehene Ritterkreuze" (Awarded Knight Crosses) under the sequential number 5147. Major Joachim Domaschk approved the nomination on 21 April 1945, noting "Knight's Cross posthumously, yes". A file card can be found in the record for rejected or unfinished nominations. The file card indicates no further information about further processing or whether the Knight's Cross was awarded. According to the Association of Knight's Cross Recipients (AKCR) the award was present in accordance with the Dönitz-decree. This is illegal according to the Deutsche Dienststelle (WASt) and lacks legal justification. The presentation date was assigned by Walther-Peer Fellgiebel.)	Heer	Leutnant	Leader of the 2./Heeres-Flak-Abteilung "Großdeutschland"	9 May 1945*	Killed in action 18 February 1945	—
Johannes Thörner	Heer	Hauptmann	Deputy leader of the III./Jäger-Regiment 738 (Note: According to Scherzer as leader of the III./Jäger-Regiment 738.)	11 July 1944	—	—
Werner Thofern	Heer	Leutnant	Zugführer (platoon leader) in the 1./Infanterie-Regiment 5 (motorized) (Note: According to Scherzer as Zugführer (platoon leader) in the 1./Schützen-Regiment 5.)	25 August 1941	—	—
Walter Thom	Heer	Obergefreiter	Gun leader in the 14.(Panzerjäger)/Grenadier-Regiment 7 (Note: According to Scherzer as gun leader in the 14./Grenadier-Regiment 7.)	23 October 1944*	Died of wounds 22 October 1944	—
Heinrich Thoma	Heer	Generalmajor	Commander of Infanterie-Regiment 519	27 October 1941	—	—
Helmut Thoma	Heer	Oberleutnant	Chief of the 9./Artillerie-Regiment 119	3 May 1942	—	
Kurt Thoma	Kriegsmarine	Korvettenkapitän	Chief of the 2. Minensuchflottille	6 October 1940	—	
Wilhelm Ritter von Thoma	Heer	Generalmajor	Commander of the 20. Panzer-Division	31 December 1941	—	
Dr. rer. pol. Adolf Thomae	Heer	Hauptmann of the Reserves	Commander of the II./Grenadier-Regiment 980	24 February 1945	—	—
Wolfgang Thomale	Heer	Oberstleutnant	Commander of Panzer-Regiment 27	10 February 1942	—	—
Karl-Anton Thomas	Luftwaffe	Oberfeuerwerker	In a Sprengkommando der Luftwaffe in Münster (Note: According to Scherzer in Sprengkommando der Luftwaffe 2./VI.)	21 April 1945	—	—
Wilhelm Thomas	Heer	Oberst	Commander of Infanterie-Regiment 71 (motorized)	13 October 1941	—	—
Siegfried Thomaschki+	Heer	Generalmajor	Commander of the 11. Infanterie-Division	1 November 1942	Awarded 299th Oak Leaves 11 September 1943	—
Dr. Ernst-Heinrich Thomsen	Luftwaffe	Major	Gruppenkommandeur of the III./Kampfgeschwader 26	24 October 1944	—	—
Rolf Thomsen+	Kriegsmarine	Kapitänleutnant	Commander of U-1202	4 January 1945	Awarded (852nd) Oak Leaves 29 April 1945	—
Hans Thor	Luftwaffe	Hauptmann	Commander of the I./Fallschirm-Panzergrenadier-Regiment 2 "Hermann Göring"	30 September 1944*	Killed in action 26 June 1944	—
Andreas Thorey+	Heer	Oberleutnant	Schwadron leader in Aufklärungs-Abteilung 94 (Note: According to Scherzer as Schwadron leader in Aufklärungs-Abteilung 9.)	14 September 1942	Awarded 349th Oak Leaves 7 December 1943	—
Viktor Thormählen	Heer	Oberleutnant (Note: According to Scherzer as Oberleutnant of the Reserves.)	Chief of the 2./Kavallerie-Regiment "Nord"	12 March 1944*	Killed in action 16 January 1944	—
Friedrich-Wilhelm Thorwest	Kriegsmarine	Korvettenkapitän of the Reserves	Chief of the 2. Geleitflottille "Adria"	5 November 1944*	Killed in action 1 November 1944	—
Werner Thoß	Luftwaffe	Oberleutnant	Staffelkapitän of the 4./Kampfgeschwader 55	29 October 1944	—	—
Heinrich Thünemann	Heer	Major	Commander of Panzer-Pionier-Bataillon 79	14 May 1944	—	—
Karl Freiherr von Thüngen? (Note: Karl Freiherr von Thüngen, in connection with the 20 July plot, failed attempt to assassinate Adolf Hitler, was deprived of all honors, ranks and orders and dishonourably discharged from the Heer on 14 August 1944. The civilian von Thüngen was sentenced to death by the Volksgerichtshof on 5 October 1944 and executed on 24 October 1944.)	Heer	Generalleutnant	Commander of the 18. Panzer-Division	6 April 1943	—	
Willi Thulke+	Heer	Oberleutnant of the Reserves	Chief of the 6./Grenadier-Regiment 501	7 January 1943	Awarded 424th Oak Leaves 13 March 1944	—
Jakob Thumann	Heer	Hauptmann	Leader of the II./Grenadier-Regiment 351	29 August 1943	—	—
Georg Thumbeck	Heer	Obergefreiter	Group leader in the 10./Grenadier-Regiment 60 (motorized)	12 November 1943	—	—
Helmut Thumm+	Heer	Oberstleutnant	Commander of Infanterie-Regiment 56	30 June 1941	Awarded 166th Oak Leaves 23 December 1942	—
Eberhard Thunert	Heer	Generalmajor	Commander of the 1. Panzer-Division	1 February 1945	—	
Karl Thurmann	Kriegsmarine	Korvettenkapitän	Commander of U-553	24 August 1942	—	—
Hans Thurner+	Luftwaffe	Leutnant	Pilot in the III./Kampfgeschwader 55	6 August 1941	Awarded 587th Oak Leaves 17 September 1944	—
Josef Thurnhuber	Luftwaffe	Leutnant	Pilot in the I./Kampfgeschwader 200	12 March 1945	—	—
Gerhard Thyben+	Luftwaffe	Oberleutnant (Note: According to Scherzer as Leutnant and pilot in the 7./Jagdgeschwader 54.)	Staffelkapitän of the 7./Jagdgeschwader 54	6 December 1944	Awarded 822nd Oak Leaves 8 April 1945	
Hans Thylmann	Heer	Major	Commander of the I./Panzergrenadier-Regiment 26	18 February 1945	—	—
Ernst Tiburzy	Volkssturm	Volkssturmmann (holding a rank equivalent to Major)	Battalion leader in the Volkssturm-Bataillon 25/82 in the fortress Königsberg (Note: According to Scherzer as battalion leader in the Volkssturm-Bataillon 25/82 in the Kampfgruppe Mikosch (fortress Königsberg).)	10 February 1945	—	—
Ekkehard Tichy	Luftwaffe	Oberleutnant	Staffelkapitän of the 9.(Sturm)/Jagdgeschwader 3 "Udet" (Note: According to Scherzer as pilot in the IV./Jagdgeschwader 3 "Udet".)	14 January 1945*	Killed in action 16 August 1944	—
Werner Tiedtke	Heer	Leutnant (Note: According to Scherzer as Leutnant of the Reserves.)	Leader of the 2./Artillerie-Regiment 349	5 April 1945	—	—
Arthur Tiefensee	Heer	Leutnant	Leader of the 7./Grenadier-Regiment 43	3 August 1944	—	—
Otto Tiemann	Heer	Generalleutnant	Commander of the 93. Infanterie-Division	28 April 1943	—	—
Kurt Tiesler	Heer	Oberstleutnant of the Reserves	Commander of Jäger-Regiment 38	16 April 1944	—	—
Hans-Diedrich von Tiesenhausen	Kriegsmarine	Kapitänleutnant	Commander of U-331	27 January 1942	—	—
[Dr.] Cord Tietjen (Note: The brackets around the doctor title [Dr.] denotes that the academic title was attained after the Knight's Cross of the Iron Cross was awarded.)	Luftwaffe	Leutnant	Zugführer (platoon leader) in the 5./Fallschirmjäger-Regiment 1	24 May 1940 (Note: According to Scherzer on 29 May 1940.)	—	—
Hermann Tietz	Heer	Hauptmann (Note: According to Scherzer as Hauptmann of the Reserves and leader of the II./Artillerie-Regiment 240.)	Commander of the II./Artillerie-Regiment 240	27 July 1944	—	—
Horst Tietzen	Luftwaffe	Hauptmann	Staffelkapitän of the 5./Jagdgeschwader 51	20 August 1940*	Killed in action 18 August 1940	—
Bruno Tilebein	Luftwaffe	Oberleutnant	Observer and Staffel officer in the 8./Kampfgeschwader 4 "General Wever"	9 October 1943	—	—
Herbert Tilgner	Heer	Oberleutnant of the Reserves	Chief of the 2./Panzer-Jäger-Abteilung 61	18 December 1944	—	—
Walter Tigner	Heer	Major of the Reserves	Battalion commander in the Regiment "Mohr" in the fortress Breslau (commander of Jäger-Ersatz und Ausbildungs Bataillon 49)	9 April 1945	—	—
Johannes Tillmann	Heer	Leutnant of the Reserves	Leader of the 10./Grenadier-Regiment 183	2 January 1943	—	—
[Dr.] Wido Tilmann	Heer	Leutnant (Note: According to Scherzer as Leutnant of the Reserves.)	Zugführer (platoon leader) in the 2./Pionier-Bataillon 297	22 December 1941	—	—
Erich Timm	Luftwaffe	Major	Commander of Fallschirmjäger-Regiment 12 (Note: According to Scherzer as commander of Fallschirmjäger-Sturm-Regiment (12).)	3 October 1944	—	—
Heinrich Timm	Kriegsmarine	Korvettenkapitän	Commander of U-862	17 September 1944	—	—
Heinz Timpe? (Note: No evidence of the award can be found in the German Federal Archives. The presentation, according to Walther-Peer Fellgiebel, was made by Feldmarschall Ferdinand Schörner based on the empowerment of 3 May 1945. According to Franz Thomas and Günter Wegmann, authors of the book series "Die Ritterkreuzträger der Deutschen Wehrmacht 1939–1945—The Knight's Cross Bearers of the German Wehrmacht 1939–1945", the presentation was authorized via radio message from the Heeresgruppe Mitte via the combat commander of the 20. Panzer-Division, and communicated by the chief of the Stabsbatterie, Leutnant Cornehl, near the Teplá Abbey near Mariánské Lázně. The presentation was noted in Heinz Timpe's paybook. Presumably Timpe had been nominated three times for Knight’s Cross, first time in September 1944, in January 1945 and April 1945. The Federal Archive holds neither record of nomination, rejection nor a file card of any proceedings. The order commission of the Association of Knight's Cross Recipients (AKCR) never processed his case either.)	Heer	Leutnant	Chief of the 1./Sturmgeschütz-Brigade 300 (F)	7 May 1945	—	—
Adolf-Hilmar von Tippelskirch	Heer	Oberleutnant	Chief of the 1./Artillerie-Regiment 3 (motorized)	29 September 1941	—	—
Kurt von Tippelskirch+	Heer	Generalleutnant	Commander of the 30. Infanterie-Division	23 November 1941	Awarded 539th Oak Leaves 30 July 1944	—
Herbert Tischendorf	Heer	Hauptmann	Company chief in schwere Panzer-Abteilung 509	11 March 1945	—	—
Kurt Tischer	Heer	Gefreiter	Machine gunner in Divisions-Füsilier-Bataillon 320	15 June 1944	—	—
Georg Titel	Heer	Oberfeldwebel	Troop leader in the 2./Grenadier-Regiment 757 (Note: According to Scherzer as company troop leader in the 2./Grenadier-Regiment 757.)	31 January 1945	—	—
Alfred Titschkus	Waffen-SS	SS-Unterscharführer	Group leader in the 3./SS-Panzer-Aufklärungs-Abteilung 3 "Totenkopf" (Note: According to Scherzer as group leader in the 3./SS-Panzer-Aufklärungs-Abteilung 3.)	11 December 1944	—	—
Rolf Tittel	Heer	Feldwebel	Zugführer (platoon leader) in the 3./Grenadier-Regiment 31	23 August 1944	—	—
Heinz-Eduard Tödt	Heer	Oberleutnant of the Reserves	Chief of the 1./Artillerie-Regiment 66	2 September 1944	—	—
Werner Töniges+	Kriegsmarine	Oberleutnant zur See	Commander of Schnellboot S-102 in the 1. Schnellbootflottille (Note: According to Scherzer as commander of Schnellboot S-102.)	25 February 1941	Awarded 143rd Oak Leaves 13 November 1942	—
Hermann Tönnjes (Note: According to Scherzer name is spelled Hermann Tönnies and as Aide-de-camp in the Stab of the I./Grenadier-Regiment 255.)	Heer	Oberfähnrich	Aide-de-camp in the I./Grenadier-Regiment 255	20 April 1944	—	—
Hans Töpfer	Luftwaffe	Oberleutnant	Staffelkapitän of the 1./Schlachtgeschwader 3 (Note: According to Scherzer as Staffelkapitän in the I./Schlachtgeschwader 3.)	20 July 1944	—	—
Otto Toll	Heer	Leutnant of the Reserves	Zugführer (platoon leader) in the Pionier-Bataillon 200	10 June 1941	—	—
Theodor Tolsdorff+	Heer	Oberleutnant	Chief of the 14./Infanterie-Regiment 22	4 December 1941	Awarded 302nd Oak Leaves 15 September 1943; 80th Swords 18 July 1944; 25th Diamonds 18 March 1945	
Günther Tonne+	Luftwaffe	Oberleutnant	Pilot in the I./Schnellkampfgeschwader 210 (Note: According to Scherzer as pilot in the 6./Schnellkampfgeschwader 210.)	5 October 1941	Awarded 632nd Oak Leaves 24 October 1944	—
Wolfgang Tonne+	Luftwaffe	Oberleutnant	Staffelkapitän of the 3./Jagdgeschwader 53	6 September 1942	Awarded 128th Oak Leaves 24 September 1942	
Erich Topp+	Kriegsmarine	Oberleutnant zur See	Commander of U-552	20 June 1941	Awarded 87th Oak Leaves 11 April 1942; 17th Swords 17 August 1942	
Karl Torley+	Heer	Oberleutnant	Chief of the 2./Infanterie-Regiment 60 (motorized)	23 November 1941	Awarded 132nd Oak Leaves 11 October 1942	—
Gottfried Tornau	Heer	Hauptmann	Leader of the Sturmartillerie-Brigade in the Führer-Grenadier-Division "Großdeutschland" (Note: According to Scherzer as leader of the Heeres-Sturmartillerie-Brigade 911.)	5 March 1945	—	—
Rudolf Toschka	Luftwaffe	Oberleutnant	Zugführer (platoon leader) in the 1./Fallschirmjäger-Sturm-Regiment 1 (Note: According to Scherzer as Zugführer (platoon leader) in the 1./Luftlande-Sturm-Regiment 1.)	14 June 1941	—	
Ewald Tost	Heer	Oberfeldwebel	Zugführer (platoon leader) in the 1./Grenadier-Regiment 507	27 August 1944	—	—
Paul Trabandt	Waffen-SS	SS-Hauptscharführer	Zugführer (platoon leader) in the 2./SS-Panzer-Jäger-Abteilung 5 "Wiking" (Note: According to Scherzer as Zugführer (platoon leader) in the 2./SS-Panzer-Jäger-Abteilung "Wiking".)	14 October 1943	—	—
Wilhelm Trabandt	Waffen-SS	SS-Standartenführer	Leader of the 1. SS-Infanterie-Brigade (motorized)	6 January 1944	—	
Willy Traber	Heer	Oberleutnant	Leader of the I./Grenadier-Regiment 309	23 March 1945	—	—
Josef Trägner	Heer	Wachtmeister	Gun leader in the 1./Sturmgeschütz-Abteilung 667	23 August 1943	—	—
Eduard Tratt+	Luftwaffe	Oberleutnant	Pilot in the I./Zerstörergeschwader 1 (Note: According to Scherzer as pilot in the II./Zerstörergeschwader 1.)	12 April 1942	Awarded 437th Oak Leaves 26 March 1944	—
Hans Traupe	Waffen-SS	SS-Sturmbannführer and Major of the Schutzpolizei	Commander of the I./SS-Polizei-Grenadier-Regiment 3	23 February 1944	—	—
Josef Trausnitz	Heer	Oberfeldwebel	In the 3./Ski-Pionier-Bataillon 85	3 November 1944	—	—
Hans Traut+	Heer	Oberstleutnant	Commander of the I./Infanterie-Regiment 90	5 August 1940	Awarded 67th Oak Leaves 23 January 1942	—
Hannes Trautloft	Luftwaffe	Major	Geschwaderkommodore of Jagdgeschwader 54	27 July 1941	—	—
Karl Trautmann	Heer	Oberst	Commander of Füsilier-Regiment 22	17 March 1945	—	—
Heinz Trautwein	Kriegsmarine	Oberleutnant zur See of the Reserves	Commander of U-Jäger 202	5 November 1944*	Killed in action 1 November 1944	—
Horst Trebes	Luftwaffe	Oberleutnant	Leader of the III./Fallschirmjäger-Sturm-Regiment (Note: According to Scherzer as leader of the III./Fallschirmjäger-Sturm-Regiment 1.)	9 July 1941	—	
Wilhelm Treckmann	Heer	Hauptmann	Commander of the II./Grenadier-Regiment 53	4 May 1944	—	—
Dr. Egon Treeck	Heer	Major	Commander of the II./Gebirgsjäger-Regiment 85	8 August 1941	—	—
Franz Treffer	Heer	Oberleutnant of the Reserves	Chief of the 5./Infanterie-Regiment 20 (motorized)	23 August 1941*	Killed in action 10 August 1941	—
Hannes (Johann) Trenke	Luftwaffe	Fahnenjunker-Feldwebel	Pilot in the 6./Kampfgeschwader 1 "Hindenburg" (Note: According to Scherzer as pilot in the 6./Kampfgeschwader 51.)	5 September 1944	—	—
Rudolf Trenkel	Luftwaffe	Oberfeldwebel	Pilot in the 2./Jagdgeschwader 52	19 August 1943	—	—
Friedhelm Trenkmann	Heer	Unteroffizier	Zugführer (platoon leader) in the 7./Grenadier-Regiment 365	21 September 1944*	Died of wounds 17 September 1944	—
Rudolf Trenn	Luftwaffe	Oberleutnant	Staffelkapitän in the 8./Schlachtgeschwader 77 (Note: According to Scherzer as Staffelkapitän in the 8./Sturzkampfgeschwader 77.)	25 May 1943*	Killed in flying accident 16 April 1943	—
Max Treptau	Heer	Gefreiter	Pioneer in the 3./Panzer-Pionier-Bataillon 86 (Note: According to Scherzer in the 3./Panzer-Pionier-Bataillon 86.)	11 March 1945	—	—
Joachim von Tresckow	Heer	Generalleutnant	Commander of the 18. Luftwaffen-Feld-Division (Note: According to Scherzer as commander of the 18. Feld-Division (L).)	19 September 1944	—	—
Heinrich Trettner+	Luftwaffe	Major im Generalstab (in the General Staff)	Ia (operations officer) in the 7. Fliegerdivision	24 May 1940	Awarded 586th Oak Leaves 17 September 1944	
Werner Trey	Heer	Hauptmann	Commander of the I./Grenadier-Regiment 1058	12 December 1944	—	—
Günther Tribukait	Heer	Major	Commander of Jäger-Bataillon 5	8 February 1943	—	—
Theodor Triebe	Luftwaffe	Hauptmann (Note: According to Scherzer as Hauptmann of the Reserves.)	Chief of the 3./Flak-Regiment 7 (motorized)	18 December 1941	—	—
Wolf-Günther Trierenberg	Heer	Generalleutnant	Commander of the 167. Infanterie-Division	10 May 1943	—	
Otto Trinko	Heer	Feldwebel	In the 4.(MG)/Grenadier-Regiment 577 (Note: According to Scherzer in the 4./Grenadier-Regiment 577.)	30 April 1945	—	—
Kurt Trippensee	Heer	Oberfeldwebel	Zugführer (platoon leader) in the 7./Gebirgsjäger-Regiment 144	2 April 1943*	Killed in action 16 February 1943	—
Willy Tritsch	Luftwaffe	Feldwebel	Pilot in the 1./Schlachtgeschwader 1	23 December 1942	—	—
Rudolf Trittel+	Heer	Major	Commander of the III./Grenadier-Regiment 479	14 August 1943	Awarded 799th Oak Leaves 23 March 1945	—
Hans Tröger	Heer	Generalmajor	Leader of the 17. Panzer-Division	4 May 1944	—	—
Rudolf Tröger	Heer	Oberfeldwebel	Aide-de-camp in the II./Grenadier-Regiment 102	17 April 1945	—	—
Hans-Hartwig Trojer	Kriegsmarine	Oberleutnant zur See	Commander of U-221	24 March 1943	—	—
Heinrich Tromm	Heer	Oberstleutnant	Commander of Infanterie-Regiment 411	15 November 1941	—	—
Friedrich Trompeter	Heer	Oberst	Deputy leader of the 305. Infanterie-Division (Note: According to Scherzer as leader of the 305. Infanterie-Division.)	21 January 1945	—	—
Louis Tronnier	Heer	Oberst	Commander of Grenadier-Regiment 70	28 November 1942	—	—
Ewald-Günther Trost	Luftwaffe	Hauptmann	Staffelkapitän of the 12./Kampfgeschwader 26	12 November 1943	—	—
Herbert Trotz	Luftwaffe	Hauptmann	Commander of the Festungs-Bataillon "Trotz" in the fortress Breslau (commander of the II./Fallschirmjäger-Regiment 26) (Note: According to Scherzer as commander of the Festungs-Grenadier-Bataillon "Trotz" in the fortress Breslau.)	30 April 1945	—	—
Adolf Trowitz	Heer	Generalmajor	Commander of the 57. Infanterie-Division	21 February 1944	—	—
Hans Trummer	Luftwaffe	Feldwebel	Aerial radio operator in the 1./Schlachtgeschwader 5	4 May 1944	—	—
Rolf Truxa	Heer	Oberleutnant	Leader of the 2./Sturmgeschütz-Abteilung 190	17 December 1943	—	—
Willy Tscherning	Luftwaffe	Oberfeldwebel	Aerial radio operator in the 9./Kampfgeschwader 1 "Hindenburg"	18 November 1944	—	—
Gerhard Tschierschwitz	Luftwaffe	Oberleutnant	Chief of the 2./Fallschirm-Panzer-Regiment "Hermann Göring" (Note: According to Scherzer as chief in the I./Fallschirm-Panzer-Regiment "Hermann Göring".)	6 December 1944	—	—
Philipp-Karl Tschoerner	Luftwaffe	Oberleutnant (Note: According to Scherzer as Oberleutnant of the and observer and aircraft commander in the Aufklärungsstaffel 5.(H)/41.)	Observer and aircraft commander in the 5.(H)/Aufklärungs-Gruppe 41	20 July 1944*	Killed in action 11 June 1944	—
Gerhard Türke	Heer	Oberleutnant of the Reserves	Chief of the 3./Infanterie-Regiment 29 (motorized)	17 December 1942	—	—
Herbert Tulodetzki	Heer	Oberfeldwebel	Leader of the 2./Grenadier-Regiment 407	5 November 1944	—	—
Heinrich Tummer	Heer	Obergefreiter	Schütze 1 in the 13./Grenadier-Regiment 19 "List" (Note: According to Scherzer in the 13./Grenadier-Regiment 19 "List".)	18 November 1944	—	—
Alois Twillemeier	Heer	Gefreiter	Krad messenger in the Stab of Füsilier-Bataillon (A.A.) 81 (Note: According to Scherzer as Krad messenger in the Stab of Füsilier-Bataillon 81.)	15 March 1944	—	—
Christian Tychsen+	Waffen-SS	SS-Sturmbannführer	Commander of the II./SS-Panzer-Regiment 2 "Das Reich" (Note: According to Scherzer as commander of the II./SS-Panzer-Regiment 2.)	31 March 1943	Awarded 353rd Oak Leaves 10 December 1943	
Rudolf von Tycowicz	Heer	Oberst	Commander of Grenadier-Regiment 407	2 September 1944	—	—
Alfred Tykiel	Heer	Oberfeldwebel	Zugführer (platoon leader) in the 6./Schützen-Regiment 10	6 August 1941	—	—
Georg Tyroller	Luftwaffe	Oberstleutnant	Commander of leichte Flak-Abteilung 84 (motorized) and leader of a Kampfgruppe (Note: According to Scherzer as commander of leichte Flak-Abteilung 84 and leader of Kampfgruppe "Tyroller" (airfield Kantemirovka-South/Soviet Union).)	23 December 1942	—	—

=== Hans Turnwald ===
Hans Turnwald is not listed by the Association of Knight's Cross Recipients (AKCR). According to Veit Scherzer, on 8 May 1945, Turnwald, as Leutnant of the Reserves and leader of Jagdpanzer-Kompanie 1015, had been nominated for the Knight's Cross of the Iron Cross. The nomination of the Heerespersonalamt (HPA—Army Personnel Office) was ready for signature but the process was never completed. In similar instances the AKCR had argued that the presentation was in accordance with the Dönitz-decree. This is illegal according to the Deutsche Dienststelle (WASt) and lacks legal justification. Scherzer claims that the AKCR forgot to list him.
