= Battle of Medenine =

1943 Allied offensive within the Tunisia campaign of WWII

- Part of the Tunisian campaign of the Second World War
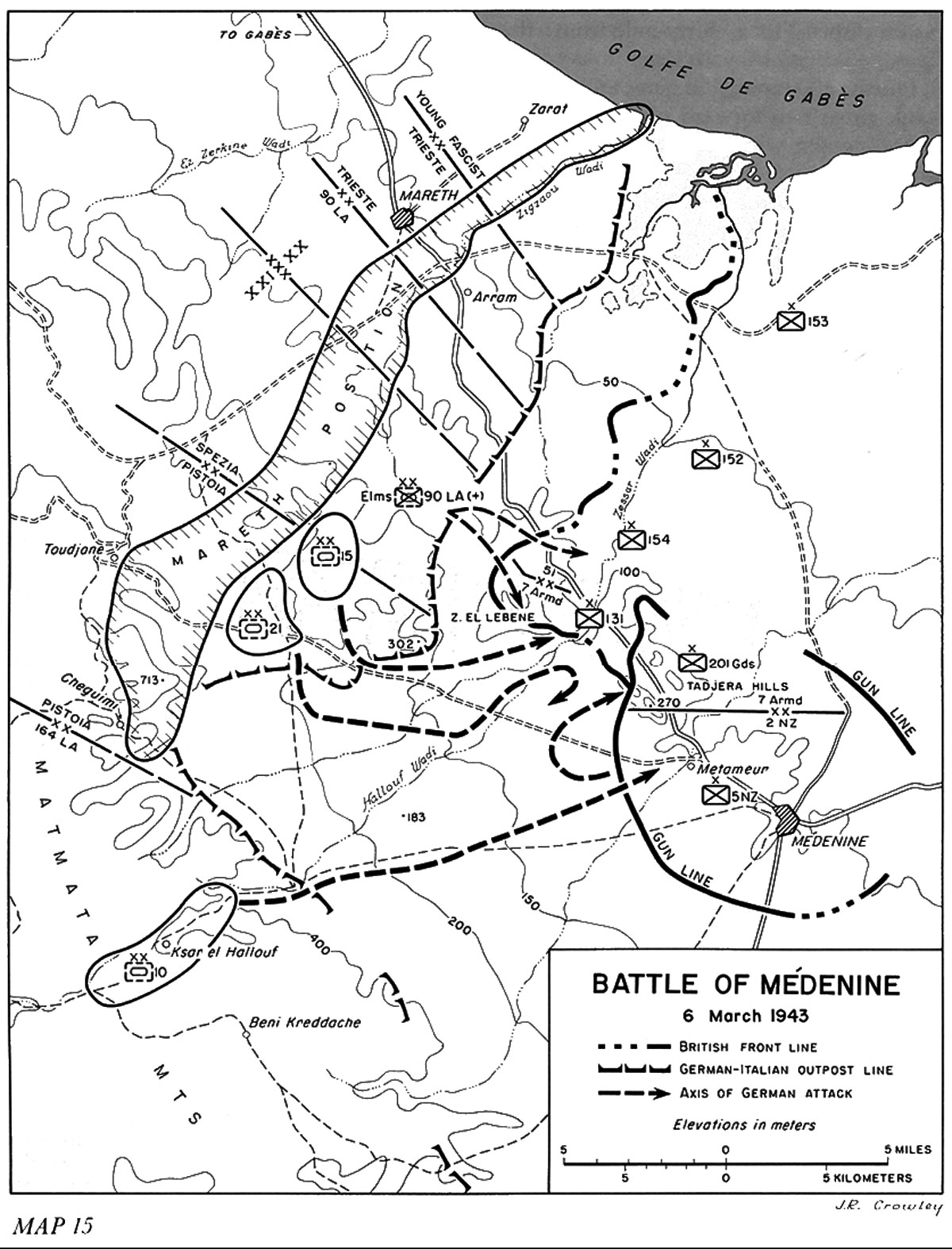
- Battle of Medenine
Date	6 March 1943
Location	Medenine, Tunisia 33°21′17″N 10°30′19″E
Result	Allied victory

Belligerents
United Kingdom; New Zealand; Free France	Germany; Italy

Commanders and leaders
Bernard Montgomery	Erwin Rommel; Giovanni Messe

Strength
2 infantry divisions; 1 armoured division; 1 armoured brigade	2 infantry divisions; 3 panzer divisions (understrength)

Casualties and losses
130; 6 tanks; 49 vehicles; 32 guns, anti-tank guns	635; 41–52 tanks
- Medenine, capital of the Medenine Governorate in Tunisia

The Battle of Medenine (German: Unternehmen Capri [Operation Capri]) was an Axis spoiling attack at Medenine in Tunisia on 6 March 1943. The operation was intended to delay an attack by the British Eighth Army on the Mareth Line. The British had been forewarned by Ultra decrypts of German wireless communications and rushed reinforcements from Tripoli and Benghazi before the Axis attack, which was a costly failure. General Erwin Rommel, the commander of Army Group Africa (Heeresgruppe Afrika), could not afford to lose forces needed for the defence of the Mareth Line and the effort was abandoned at dusk that day.

During the night, the Eighth Army remained alert for the possibility of another Axis attempt and sent forward reconnaissance patrols to keep watch and demolish knocked-out Axis tanks. During the day the Luftwaffe and Regia Aeronautica had made a maximum effort with little effect against the Allied anti-aircraft defence and the Desert Air Force (DAF). On 7 March the Axis forces began a withdrawal northwards towards the Mareth Line, the Eighth Army pursuit being slowed by rain. The Battle of Medenine was the last commanded by Rommel in the North African Campaign, who returned to Europe for good soon afterwards.

== Background ==
=== Axis retreat from El Alamein ===
The retreat of Deutsch-Italienische Panzerarmee took place from 5 November 1942 – 15 February 1943 and on 8 November, Operation Torch began in Morocco, Algeria and Tunisia. The Panzerarmee evaded British outflanking moves but traffic jams, fuel shortage, poor weather and air attacks reduced the retreat to 6–7 mi (9.7–11.3 km) per day. Comando Supremo in Rome and Oberkommando der Wehrmacht in Berlin took an optimistic view of the situation and Comando Supremo chose the Mersa-el-Brega–El Agheila position as the terminus of the retreat, despite the position having a front 110 mi (180 km) long, strong points up to 5 mi (8.0 km) apart, too far for mutual support and being protected by only 30,000 mines. When the Panzerarmee arrived, the Afrika Korps had only 5,000 men, 35 tanks, 16 armoured cars, 12 anti-tank guns, 12 field howitzers and deliveries of only 50 long tons (51 t) of the 400 long tons (410 t) of supplies needed daily.

Rommel had wanted retreat to Wadi Akarit in the Gabès area, 120 mi (190 km) further west, where the non-motorised troops could defend the narrow gap between the Mediterranean and the Chott Djerid. The tanks and motorised infantry could join the 5th Panzer Army (Colonel-General Hans-Jürgen von Arnim) further north, drive back the First Army from Tunisia into Algeria, then swiftly return to force back the Eighth Army, preparatory to embarkation for Europe. At a meeting with Hitler on 28 November, Rommel discussed the proposal but only received a promise of more supplies. On the night of 11/12 December, the British attacked and on the following evening the Panzerarmee resumed its retreat and despite the chronic fuel shortage, evaded another outflanking move.

The Panzerarmee took up a defensive position at Buerat on 29 December but this was poorly fortified, wide open to an outflanking manoeuvre and vulnerable to being cut off by an attack on Gabès by the First Army from southern Tunisia. The supply situation was little better, with 152 long tons (154 t) tons of the 400 long tons (406 t) daily requirement being delivered and 95 per cent of the fuel being used to distribute supplies or for withdrawals. The Long Range Desert Group (LRDG) attacked Axis supply lines and hundreds of lorries were stranded along roads for lack of fuel, while the Eighth Army massed petrol and ammunition for its next attack. On 13 January 1943, the infantry of the 21st Panzer Division were sent north to the 5th Panzer Army, to guard against the loss of Gabès.

On 15 January, the Eighth Army attacked with 450 tanks against 36 German and 57 Italian tanks; in the evening Rommel ordered another withdrawal. Lack of fuel and apprehension about the threat to Gabès, led to the retreat passing beyond the Tarhuna–Homs line and Tripoli was occupied by the British on 23 January, the Axis retreat from El Alamein having covered 1,400 mi (2,300 km). On 13 February, the last Axis soldiers left Libya and on 15 February, the rearguard reached the Mareth Line, 80 mi (130 km) inside Tunisia. Comando Supremo intended the line to be held indefinitely but Rommel considered it too vulnerable to another flanking move, unlike the Wadi Akarit position, another 40 mi (64 km) back.

=== Operation Torch ===
On 7 November 1942, Anglo–American troops landed in Morocco and Algeria, the British First Army (Lieutenant-General Kenneth Anderson) either side of Algiers and the US II Corps (Major-General Lloyd Fredendall) at Casablanca and Oran, against the resistance of Vichy French forces, until an armistice on 10 November. On 14 November, the Allied forces tried to reach Tunis, 500 mi (800 km) to the east through mountainous country by a coup de main assisted by parachute landings but poor weather, a rapid German build-up of Luftwaffe aircraft and the airlift of troops from Sicily to Tunisia under Case Anton ended the advance on 30 November. The Axis troops were able to form a bridgehead around the ports of Tunis and Bizerta and by December, about 15,000 German troops, fifty Panzer IV and forty Tiger tanks had arrived. The 5th Panzer Army had been formed on 8 December and winter weather began in mid-month, which was further to the advantage of the Axis defenders, as Panzerarmee Afrika continued its retreat from El Alamein towards southern Tunisia. Having stabilised the Axis position in Tunisia, the 5th Panzer Army undertook several local offensives in the new year, at the Battle of Sidi Bou Zid (14–17 February), the Battle of Kasserine Pass (19–24 February) and Operation Ochsenkopf (26 February – 4 March 1943).

=== Mareth Line ===
Tunisia during the 1942–1943 campaign

Southern Tunisia is a region of broken terrain, with rocky ridge lines and desert, which obstruct manoeuvre; opposite a bight where the north–south coast opens to the east, a semi-arid, scrub covered coastal plain is met inland by the Matmata Hills which run south to north. North of Gabès, the road to Sfax passes between the sea and the Chotts, the only route north for the Eighth Army. Across the plain in a line roughly southwest to northeast, lay the Mareth Line, a fortification built by the French in the 1930s.

In the north, the hills and line of forts terminated at the Tebaga Gap, a low pass between the Matmata Hills and the Djebel Tebaga, another line of high ground to the west of the gap running east–west. (Note: Known as the Gabès gap, the coastal strip from Gabès to Wadi Akarit from the sea to the Chott el Fedjadj and the northwards ridges extending to the heights of Djebel Tebaga Fatnassa.) North and west of this feature is the Chott el Djerid; west of the Matmata Hills, lies dry Jebel Dahar country and then the impassable sand of the Grand Erg Oriental. Gabès is on the coast where the plain meets the route from the Tebaga Gap.

The Mareth Line followed the line of Wadi Zigzaou, a natural tank obstacle, with steep banks rising up to 70 ft (21 m); the north-west side had been fortified by the French and was reinforced by Axis engineers. The wadi crosses the coastal plain from Zarat to Toujane and into the Matmata Hills beyond. In 1938, the French judged Jebel Dahar to be impassable to motorised transport and had not extended the Mareth Line any further inland but 1943 motor vehicles had much better performance. The Italian 1st Army (General Giovanni Messe) occupied the Mareth Line with the 90th Light Division, 164th Light Afrika Division, and the 10th Panzer Division, 15th Panzer Division and the 21st Panzer Division of the Afrika Korps with about 200 tanks and the 80th Infantry Division "La Spezia".

== Prelude ==
=== Axis preparations ===
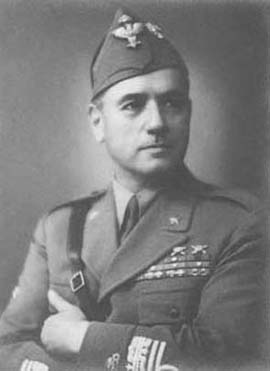
General Giovanni Messe

On 28 February, Rommel, Messe and the senior panzer unit commanders met to discuss an attack on Medenine, the junction of several roads and tracks. An attack from three directions was suggested, from Toujane to Metameur on the left, an attack in the centre and an attack on the right from the Hallouf Pass to Medenine. Rommel suggested an attack nearer the coast to create the possibility of attacking from an unexpected direction but the subordinates disagreed because of information from reconnaissance by the Afrika Korps that the coastal approaches were difficult, mined and covered by many guns. There was no room for manoeuvre and the tanks would be easy targets for British artillery and aircraft. Rommel gave way and the plan was drawn up by Messe and Lieutenant-General Heinz Ziegler, the temporary commander of the Afrika Korps.

The attack was set for 6 March to give time for the units involved in Unternehmen Morgenluft (the Battle of Sidi Bou Zid) to replace casualties and re-organise. Messe planned to encircle the British troops between the Mareth Line and Medenine with the DAK Group (Generalleutnant Hans Cramer) formed from the three Afrika Korps panzer divisions, Reconnaissance units 3 and 33, a battalion of the 164th Light Afrika Division, a parachute battalion, seven field artillery batteries and two anti-aircraft battalions and Column Bari (Generalleutnant Theodor von Sponeck) a battlegroup with two battalions of Panzergrenadier Regiment 200, two battalions of Panzergrenadier Regiment 361, the La Spezia and the Trieste battle groups with two battalions each, a battery of German field guns and several Nebelwerfer, seven Italian field batteries and part of three anti-aircraft batteries; both columns had attached anti-tank and engineer units.

=== Axis plan ===
The DAK was to capture a line from Hir en Nraa to Ksar Rebounten and then circle north or north-east, the 10th Panzer Division advancing from the Hallouf valley to capture Metameur. The 21st Panzer Division was to emerge from the south end of Djebel Tebaga and attack towards Hir Ksar Koutine. The 15th Panzer Division was to move from Djebel er Remtsia towards Hir en Nraa followed by its infantry and the Reconnaissance units were to cut the Foum Tatahouine–Medenine road to prevent the movement of British reinforcements. Column Bari was to make a frontal attack at Zemlet el Lebene with Battle Group Spezia on the right flank, Panzer Grenadier Regiment 200 in the centre and Battle Group Trieste on the left. (Note: The mechanised units had three issues of petrol, there was one issue of ammunition for all of the attacking force and there were varying amounts of ammunition, depending on the type of gun. The Luftwaffe had about 100 operational aircraft and the Regia Aeronautica had about sixty.) On 5 March, the Luftwaffe and Regia Aeronautica were to bomb Allied airfields and cover the assembly of the ground force and on 6 March were to attack British artillery positions east of Zemlet el Lebene, close the forward Allied airfields, provide fighter escorts for the ground attack and reconnoitre from Tatahouine to Ben Gardane.

=== British preparations ===
Long before the Eighth Army reached the port of Tripoli, thought had been given to an attack on the Mareth Line and the LRDG had been sent to survey the land south of the Matmata Hills. Despite maps and reports indicating that the ground was impossible for tanks and lorries, the LRDG found a route inland southwards and around the hills to the Tebaga Gap, between the Chott el Fejaj salt marsh and the hills. The 7th Armoured Division (Major-General George Erskine) had probed forward from Tripoli, while the 51st (Highland) Division (Major-General Douglas Wimberley) and the 2nd New Zealand Division (Major-General Bernard Freyberg) rested at the port. Winter rains turned the ground into a swamp, until a short lull beginning on 15 February, when the 7th Armoured and 51st (Highland) divisions moved forward and captured airfields at Medenine on 17 February. The next day the Free French Flying Column and the 1st Infantry Battalion Marine and Pacific arrived with General Philippe Leclerc, after a march across the Sand Sea from Lake Chad, to join the Eighth Army. XXX Corps (Lieutenant-General Oliver Leese) brought the 2nd New Zealand Division forward from Tripoli, which had the 8th Armoured Brigade and the 201st Guards Brigade under command.

The Allied code breakers of the Government Code and Cipher School at Bletchley Park in England, read Axis Enigma codes and on 25 February, warned Montgomery that Rommel had ordered the termination of the Battle of Kasserine Pass (19–24 February). On 28 February, they decrypted orders from Rommel for a reconnaissance to be conducted by the 1st Italian Army, preparatory to an attack on the Eighth Army by 4 March and a fuel return on 1 March showed that the Axis forces had sufficient for a three-day operation. On 26 February, the Eighth Army had only about one division at Medenine, most of its tanks were with X Corps (Lieutenant-General Brian Horrocks) at Benghazi, 1,000 mi (1,600 km) away and an attack on the Mareth Line could not be ready before 20 March. Montgomery thought that XXX Corps at Medenine would not be able to withstand an attack before 7 March but over three days and nights, reinforcements were rushed forward and by 4 March, 400 tanks, 350 field guns and 470 anti-tank guns had been moved up. The DAF had also increased the number of aircraft in the area to double that of the Axis air forces. At 5:36 a.m. on 6 March, Allied code breakers sent notice to Montgomery of the thrust line of the attack and that it was to begin at 6:00 a.m.

== Battle ==
=== 6 March ===
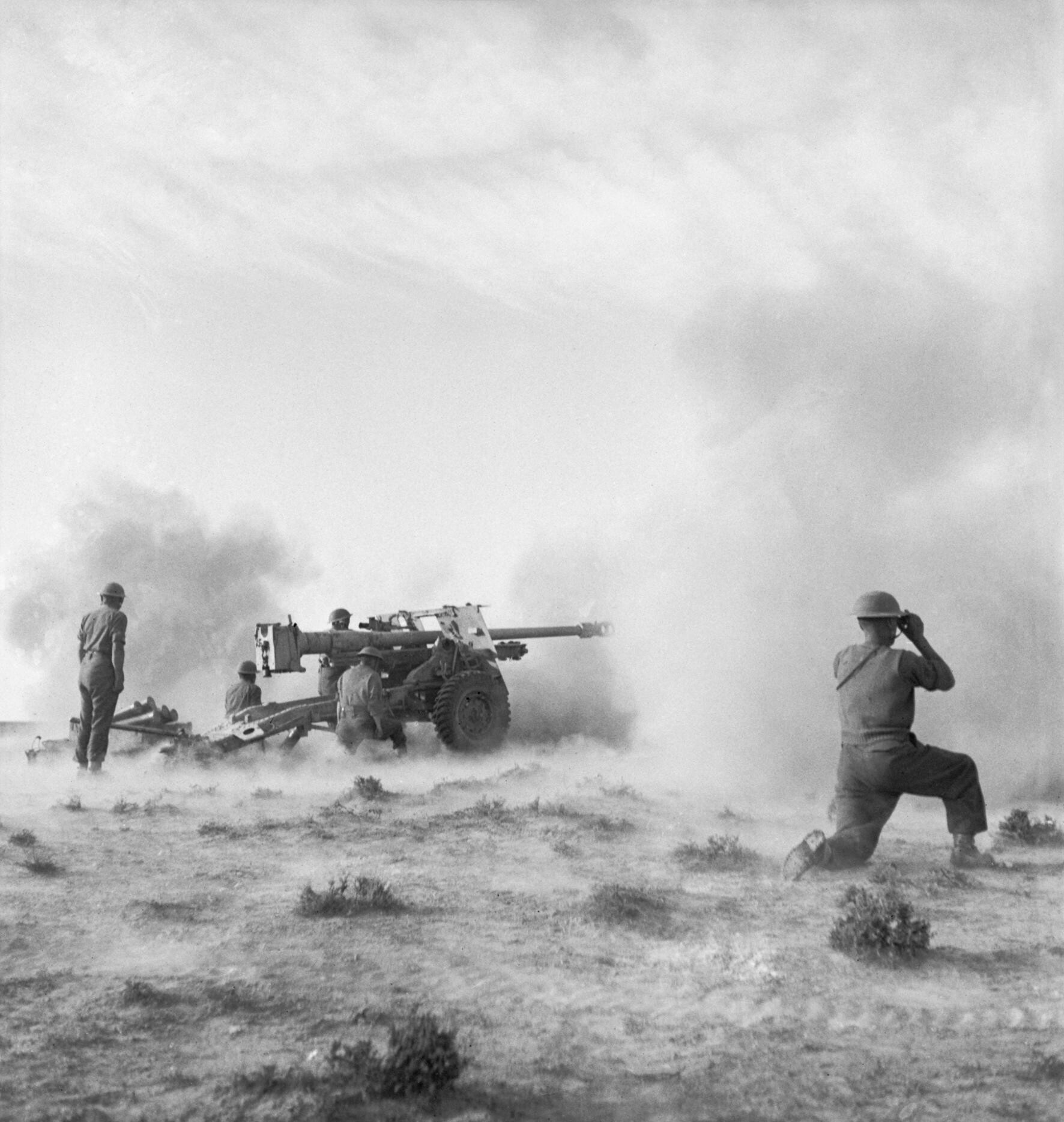
British 17-pounder anti-tank gun in action, 11 March 1943

It was foggy when the Axis bombardment of the British forward positions began at 6:00 a.m. and for ninety minutes tanks, guns and other vehicles emerged from the heights between Toujane and Kreddache. Tanks of the 15th Panzer Division moved along the Toujane–Medenine road and then turned north against the positions of the 7th Armoured Division and were engaged by the anti-tank guns of the 131st Infantry Brigade and the 2nd Battalion Scots Guards. On the 2nd New Zealand Division front, the 164th Light Afrika Division was engaged by Bren carriers of the 21st NZ Battalion, which met seven vehicles carrying infantry and anti-tank guns at close range in the fog.

The New Zealanders inflicted many casualties, for the loss of two casualties and a carrier. Small parties of Axis infantry probed the front and as the fog dispersed, artillery was seen moving up. The British artillery did not reply, being under orders to wait until the attackers were in range of the maximum number of guns; the anti-tank guns were only to commence firing at short range. The 5th Field Regiment Royal Artillery (RA) did not begin to fire until Axis tanks were engaged by the forward six-pounders and then bombarded infantry and lorries following the tanks, isolating them.

At about 8:30 a.m., tanks were reported to be converging on Tadjera Kbir (Point 270) and the 28th NZ Battalion reported ten tanks and thirty trucks moving up the wadi to its right. The tanks reached a dummy minefield and then diverted towards rising ground, as had been intended. Two 6-pounder anti-tank guns from the 73rd Anti-Tank Regiment RA opened fire and knocked out four Panzer III Specials at 400 yd (370 m) and the mortars of the 28th NZ Battalion knocked out a fifth tank. When the crews alighted, mortars, machine-guns and artillery joined in. The attackers were taken by surprise and disorganised but then spotted the anti-tank guns and returned fire. A 6-pounder was damaged and two men wounded but the rest kept firing until the other weapons commenced fire; the surviving tanks retired. Fifteen prisoners from the 10th Panzer Division, including the tank company commander, were taken.

Just after 9:00 a.m., 21st Battalion mortar fire dispersed a group of infantry dismounting from vehicles and by about 10:00 a.m., the remaining infantry withdrew and dug in 3–4 mi (4.8–6.4 km) to the rear. The British artillery fired everywhere, especially on areas registered beforehand, as soon as Axis troops or vehicles moved into them. The leading tanks of the 21st Panzer Division crossed a skyline and were engaged, observers of the 201st Guards Brigade reporting that they "wandered rather vaguely". The 2nd New Zealand Division was not attacked again during the morning but much disorganised movement of tanks and transport was seen. It was realised that the main Axis effort was against Tadjera Kbir and further north. On the left flank, Reconnaissance units 3 and 33 and the Headquarters Kampfstaffel with nine tanks, worked round to the Foum Tatahouine–Medenine road against the Free French Flying Column, which repulsed attacks along the road from a point 12 mi (19 km) south of Medenine, losing 27 casualties during the day.

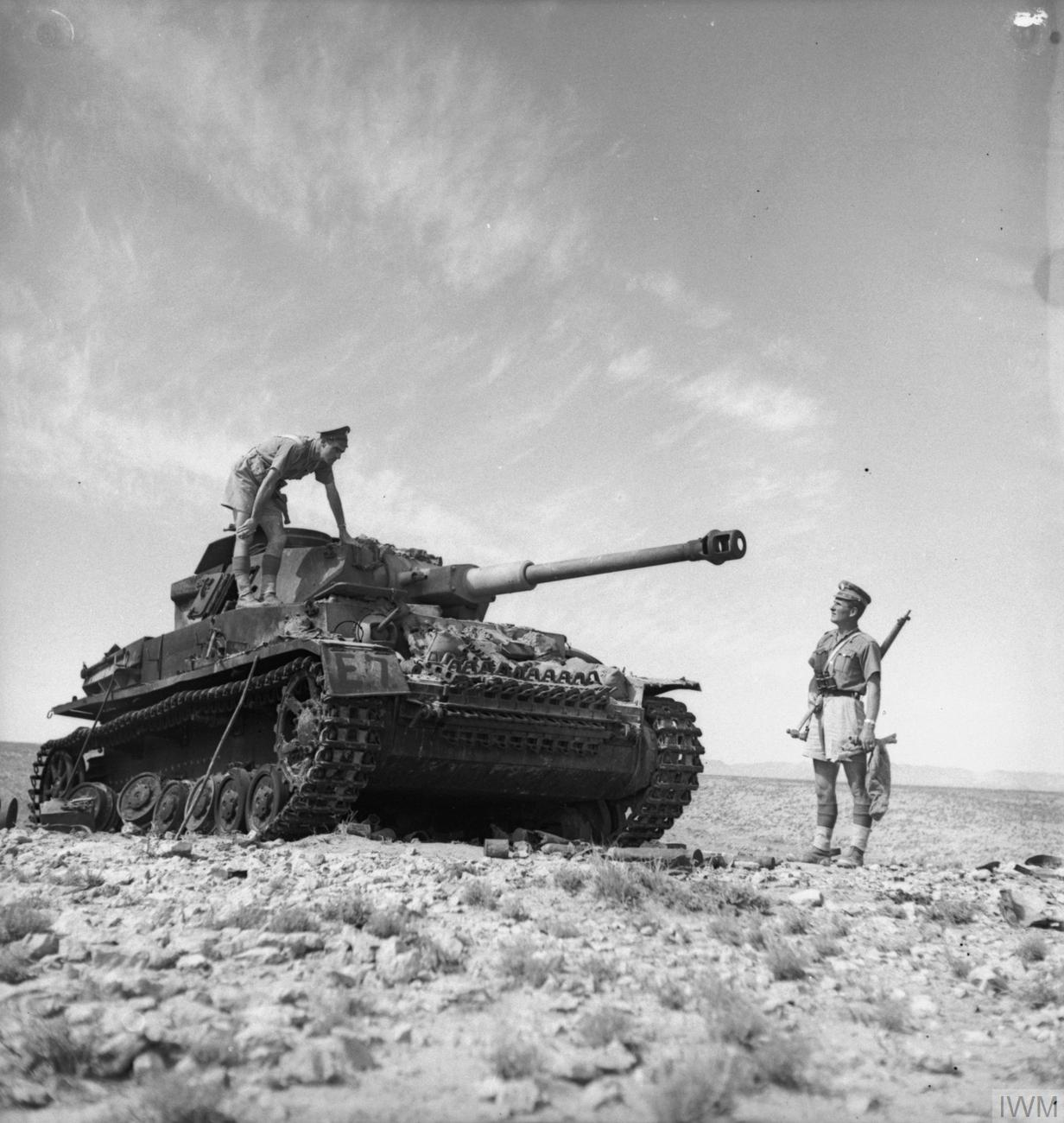
British soldiers inspect a knocked-out German Panzer IV after the battle.

In the afternoon, Axis infantry joined in the attacks and from about 3:30 p.m. were dispersed by the 2nd New Zealand Division artillery. At 5:45 p.m., about 1,000 infantry with tank support advanced west of Point 270 and were devastated by the 2nd New Zealand Division artillery, the 5th Army Group Royal Artillery field and medium regiments and the heavy anti-aircraft guns on a landing ground nearby. A troop of captured 88 mm guns with Royal Artillery crews operated as anti-aircraft guns. On the 51st Highland Division and 7th Armoured Division fronts, the Axis attacks were more determined but had little success and Tadjera Kbir was never threatened. At 6:00 p.m., 27 Axis tanks and infantry were engaged by the New Zealand field artillery, after which there were no more attacks on the New Zealand front. At about 8:30 p.m., Rommel accepted a suggestion from Messe to end the attack, since it could not be continued without risking losses which would compromise the defence of the Mareth Line.

Sorties by Luftwaffe and Regia Aeronautica fighter-bombers and fighters were made during the day but had little effect as the DAF controlled the air above the battlefield. Two New Zealanders were killed and two wounded in a raid over the 4th Field Ambulance and Bf 109 was shot down by the 26th Battalion with a captured Breda machine-gun. As dusk fell, the attackers withdrew, a detachment of the King's Royal Rifle Corps and other units at Haddada having remained undisturbed, despite being isolated when the FFF Column on the right was forced back, during an Axis outflanking move.

During the night of 6/7 March, XXX Corps patrols went out to find out if the attack would resume on 7 March, despite the Axis tank casualties, which as dark fell on 6 March, were already known to be 40–50, making another attack unlikely. On the New Zealand Division front, vigilance was maintained in case of an outflanking move south of the defensive line and after dark the five tanks knocked out on the 28th Battalion front were demolished, along with the others disabled along the XXX Corps front. Some tanks of the Staffordshire Yeomanry were moved forward slightly in the New Zealand area but the night was quiet except for British artillery harassing fire until 3:30 a.m.

== Aftermath ==
=== Analysis ===
In 1966, Ian Playfair, the British official historian, wrote that during the attack, the XXX Corps artillery fired about 30,000 shells and that the Luftwaffe had made a maximum effort, attacking DAF airfields and attempting close support of the 1st Italian Army, which failed against British anti-aircraft fire and the DAF, only tactical reconnaissance sorties having much success. In 1978, Matthew Cooper wrote that had the Axis attacked the previous week, it might have found the Eighth Army unprepared, having attacked at short notice to divert attention from the British First Army during Unternehmen Ochsenkopf. The rapid preparations made to receive the Axis attack, enabled the Eighth Army easily to defeat the offensive and Rommel wrote that the failure to delay the British attack on the Mareth Line, caused "a great gloom" and that for the Axis to remain in Africa was suicide.

=== Casualties ===
In 1943, Montgomery made a diary note that the Eighth Army had suffered 130 casualties and in 1957, G. F. Howe, the US official historian, recorded German losses of 61 killed, 388 wounded and 32 missing, 33 Italians killed, 122 wounded and 9 missing; a minimum of 41 Axis tanks were lost. The Germans claimed 6 British tanks, 16 scout cars, 33 motor vehicles, 32 anti-tank and anti-aircraft guns and 51 prisoners. In 1966, the British official historian, Ian Playfair, called the Eighth Army losses trifling and recorded 635 Axis casualties, mostly Germans and 44–56 Axis tanks.

=== Subsequent operations ===
At dawn on 7 March, some groups of Axis transport were seen moving to the north and quickly drew out of range as they were engaged by artillery. There were rearguard actions from 7 to 8 March, as the Germans withdrew to the Mareth Line and Gabès but British attempts at pursuit were frustrated by the weather and the speed of the Axis withdrawal. On 10 March, some heights were still occupied and there was sporadic long-range artillery fire; Rommel left Africa the same day for the last time, leaving Arnim in command. The defeat had been so comprehensive that it caused the Germans to question their security and Montgomery was rebuked for not taking greater steps to hide the source of his information.

On 6 March, Montgomery wrote to General Sir Alan Brooke, the Chief of the Imperial General Staff (the professional head of the British Army)

He is trying to attack me in daylight with tanks, followed by lorried infantry. I have 500 6pdr atk guns dug in...I have 400 tanks...good infantry...and a great weight of artillery. It is an absolute gift, and the man must be mad.

— Montgomery

Allied plans for the attack on the Mareth Line continued virtually undisturbed. On 17 March, the II US Corps began Operation Wop (sic), an attack towards Gafsa, the Eighth Army began the preliminary Operation Walk and Operation Canter and then began Operation Pugilist, the Battle of the Mareth Line on 19 March.

== See also ==
- List of British military equipment of World War II
- List of French military equipment of World War II
- List of German military equipment of World War II
- List of Italian Army equipment in World War II
- North African campaign timeline
- List of World War II battles
