= Hermann Schulte-Heuthaus =

- Born: 15 January 1898
- Died: 28 December 1979 (aged 81)
- Military career
- Allegiance: German Empire; Weimar Republic; Nazi Germany
- Branch: Army (Wehrmacht)
- Rank: Generalmajor
- Commands: 90th Light Infantry Division; Panzer Grenadier Division Brandenburg
- Conflicts: World War II
- Awards: Knight's Cross of the Iron Cross

Hermann Schulte-Heuthaus (15 January 1898, Klein Weißensee – 28 December 1979) was a German general during World War II. He was a recipient of the Knight's Cross of the Iron Cross of Nazi Germany.

== Awards and decorations ==
- Knight's Cross of the Iron Cross on 23 January 1942 as Oberstleutnant and commander of Kradschützen-Bataillon 25

Military offices
Preceded by Generalmajor Hermann-Bernhard Ramcke	Commander of 90th Light Infantry Division; 17 September 1942 – 22 September 1942	Succeeded by Generalleutnant Theodor Graf von Sponeck
Preceded by Oberst Erich Kahsnitz	Commander of Füsilier Regiment Großdeutschland; 7 July 1943 – 4 September 1943	Succeeded by Major Rudolf Wätjen
Preceded by Generalleutnant Fritz Kühlwein	Commander of Panzer-Grenadier-Division Brandenburg; 16 October 1944 – 8 May 1945	Succeeded by None
