= Sardinian Infantry Division =

Military unit of the Wehrmacht

Division Sardinia
- German: Division Sardinien
- Active: 12 May 1943 – 6 July 1943
- Country: Germany
- Branch: Army
- Role: Infantry
- Size: Division
- Garrison/HQ: Sardinia

Commanders
- Major General: Carl-Hans von Lungershausen

The Division Sardinia (German: Division Sardinien) was a infantry division of the Wehrmacht during World War II.

== History ==
The Division Sardinia was formed on May 12, 1943, in Sardinia from the staff of the Sturmbrigade XI (11th Assault Brigade). It became division strength just as the Army Group Africa was surrendering in Tunisia. The original reason for the creation of the division was due to its exposure to the allies after the "official" end of Operation Torch. Because the invasion of Sardinia never happened the division was "de-mobilized" and helped the re-incarnation of the 90th Panzergrenadier Division in 1943.

== Organization ==
Organization of the Division just before its change of name:

- Headquarters (Former Stab, Sturmbrigade XI)
- Sardinisches Panzerbataillon – (Sardinian Panzer Battalion)
- 1. Sarinian Panzergrenadier Regiment – 1st Sarinian Panzergrenadier Regiment
- 2. Sarinian Panzergrenadier Regiment – 2nd Sardinian Panzergrenadier Regiment
- 190. Artillerie-Regiment – 190th Artillery Regiment - Former Sardinian Artillery Regiment
- 190. Panzerzerstörer-Bataillon – 190th Tank Destroyer Battalion
- 190. Pionere Bataillon – 190th Engineer Battalion - Former Sardinian Engineer Battalion
- 190. Signalbataillon – 190th Signal Battalion - Former Sardinian Signal Company
