= Richard Koll =

German general in the Wehrmacht

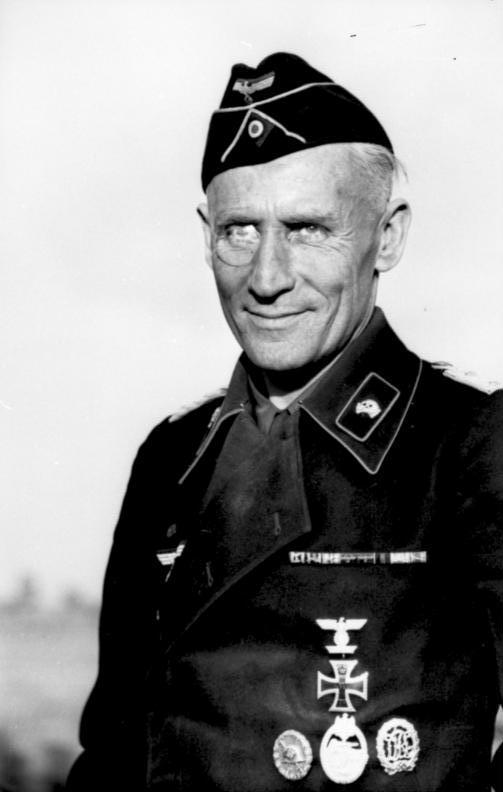
- Koll in 1941
- Born: April 7, 1897; Koblenz, German Empire
- Died: 13 May 1963 (aged 66); West Berlin, Germany
- Military career
- Allegiance: German Empire; Weimar Republic; Nazi Germany
- Branch: German Army
- Service years: 1914–45
- Rank: Generalleutnant
- Commands: 1st Panzer Division
- Conflicts: World War I; World War II; Battle of France; Operation Barbarossa; Siege of Leningrad; Battle of Moscow; Rzhev-Vyazma Strategic Offensive Operation; Battle of Korsun–Cherkassy
- Awards: Knight's Cross of the Iron Cross

Richard Koll (April 7, 1897 – May 13, 1963) was a German general in the Wehrmacht during World War II who commanded the 1st Panzer Division. He was also a recipient of the Knight's Cross of the Iron Cross of Nazi Germany.

== World War I ==
Richard Koll was born on April 7, 1897, in Koblenz and following a graduation from the Prussian Cadet Corps, he was commissioned Fähnrich (officer candidate) in August 1914. He was subsequently assigned to 4th Telegraph Battalion in Karlsruhe for basic training. Upon completion one month later, Koll was transferred to 25th Reserve Telephone Battalion, 25th Reserve Division and participated in combats in Belgium and France in September–November 1914. He was commissioned Leutnant on September 17, 1914.

Koll then served with his unit on Eastern Front until April 1915, when he was transferred to the staff of 49th Reserve Division as Telephone officer under Generalleutnant Friedrich von Bernhardi. By the end of 1915, he was transferred to the staff of Army Group Prince Leopold of Bavaria and remained in the eastern front until June 1916, when he was transferred to Berlin for duty with the Radio Operator School.

In January 1917, Koll was ordered to Breslau in Lower Silesia and commanded Radio Operator Recruitment Depot for two months, before he was ordered to Namur, Belgium for Division-Signals Course. He assumed command of 70th Radio-Small Battalion in June 1917 and held that assignment for a year, when he was transferred to the staff of 7th Division, operating on the Western Front. For his service during the War, Koll was decorated with both classes of the Prussian Iron Cross.

== Interwar period ==
Following the Armistice, Koll served with Freikorps as a member of the Guard-Cavalry-Rifle-Division and took part in the suppressing of Spartacist uprising led by communists. He then served with various Freikorps units until mid-October 1919, when his unit was integrated into newly created Reichswehr. Koll then served as leader of Signals-Platoon of Reichswehr Group Command 2 under General Roderich von Schoeler in Kassel until January 1921, when he was ordered for instruction to the Pioneer school in Munich.

Koll was then assigned to 2nd Motor Transport Battalion in Berlin and served successively as company commander and as adjutant and welfare officer. During his time with that unit, he attended the Technische Hochschule in Charlottenburg (now Technische Universität Berlin) and also completed several instructions including military expertise course with the Inspection for Weapons & Equipment; Troop Signal course; and Pyrotechnical course. He was promoted to Oberleutnant in July 1925.

By the end of January 1931, Koll retired as Hauptmann due to Reichswehr budget cuts, but was able to return to active duty in November that year. He was assigned to 6th Division in Münster and served as company commander in divisional 6th Motor Transport Battalion until October 1935, when he assumed duty as adjutant of 2nd Panzer Brigade. While in this capacity, Koll was promoted to major in January 1936.

Koll assumed command of 2nd Battalion of 11th Panzer-Regiment in October 1937 and led his unit during the occupation of Sudetenland in October 1938. He was promoted to Oberstleutnant in March 1939. The regiment subsequently received the Czech-built Panzer 35(t) captured from the Czechoslovak Army, which was superior to both the Panzer I and Panzer II with which the battalion had been previously equipped.

== World War II ==
Following the outbreak of World War II, Koll assumed command of 11th Panzer-Regiment assigned to 6th Panzer Division under Generalleutnant Werner Kempf in January 1940 and led his unit during the Battle of France in summer that year. His regiment was subsequently reinforced by 45 of Panzer II and 27 Panzer IV tanks, and ordered to East Prussia. He was promoted to Oberst on December 1, 1940.

During the Operation Barbarossa in June 1941, the German invasion of the Soviet Union, Koll led his regiment as the part of Kampfgruppe (Battle Group) under Generalleutnant Erhard Raus in advance on Leningrad and distinguished himself in combat in early days of the invasion. For his service during that period, Koll was decorated with the Knight's Cross of the Iron Cross.

Koll remained on the Eastern Front until July 1942, participating in the Siege of Leningrad, Battle of Moscow and Rzhev-Vyazma Strategic Offensive Operation and returned to Germany. He was transferred to the Führerreserve and remained there until September 1942, when he assumed duty as Chief of Motor Vehicle Repair Matters in the Office of Oberkommando des Heeres.

Upon his promotion to Generalmajor on August 6, 1943, Koll became Chief of Repair Matters in the Office of the Oberkommando der Wehrmacht and served in this capacity until November that year, when he was sent to the Infantry School in Döberitz for Division-Leaders course. Koll completed that instruction one month later and assumed temporary command of 1. Panzer-Division stationed in the southern sector of the Eastern Front. Unfortunately he did not perform well in the division's attempt to relieve the Cherkassy pocket in February 1944 and was relieved of command by General Hermann Breith, commander of III Army Corps.

Koll then returned to the Oberkommando der Wehrmacht and assumed duty as Chief of Wehrmacht Motor Transport Matters with additional duty as Plenipotentiary for Motor Transport Matters in Four Year Plan Office. He was promoted to Generalleutnant on January 30, 1945.

== Postwar life ==
He was captured by the British Army on May 9, 1945, and remained in captivity until the end of February 1946, when he was released. Koll then settled in West-Berlin, where he died on May 13, 1963, aged 66. He was buried at Waldfriedhof Dahlem.

== Awards and decorations ==
- Knight's Cross of the Iron Cross on 15 July 1941 as Oberst and commander of Panzer-Regiment 11
- Clasp to the Iron Cross (1939)
  - 2nd Class
  - 1st Class
- Eastern Front Medal
- Panzer Badge in Silver
- Wound Badge in Silver
- Sudetenland Medal
- Wehrmacht Long Service Award, 1st Class
- Honour Cross of the World War 1914/1918
- Iron Cross (1914)
  - 2nd Class
  - 1st Class

Military offices
Preceded by Generalleutnant Walter Krüger	Commander of 1. Panzer-Division; 1 January 1944 - 19 February 1944	Succeeded by Generalmajor Werner Marcks
