= 361st Infantry Regiment (Wehrmacht) =

WWII German Army unit

361st Light Infantry Regiment
- 361. leichte Infanterie-Regiment
- Active: August 1941 – May 1943
- Country: Nazi Germany
- Branch: Army
- Type: Infantry
- Role: Light infantry
- Size: Regiment
- Part of: 90th Light Division
- Engagements: North African Campaign; Italian Campaign

The 361st Africa Infantry Regiment (Infanterie-Regiment Afrika 361) was a unit of the German Army (Wehrmacht) which served with the 90th Africa Division of the Africa Corps in the Western Desert campaign. It was constituted from Germans who had served in the French Foreign Legion before the Battle of France in May and June 1940.

In the aftermath of the French campaign, the German Armistice Commission exercised pressure on the newly constituted Vichy regime to repatriate German nationals serving as légionnaires in French North Africa. Although the Legion established significant obstacles to prevent repatriation, some Germans did voluntarily return out of fear of incurring worse sanctions from the Nazi regime if they refused to comply. According to the historian Douglas Porch, "most of these men must have been legionnaires of fairly ancient vintage, as those Germans coming into the Legion after 1934 were increasingly Jews and other political refugees who would not have risked repatriation".

Initially formed as the 361st Africa Regiment and used for military labour, it was armed and re-designated as an infantry regiment in April 1942 and was close to the fighting at the Battle of Bir Hakeim in which the 13th Demi-Brigade of the Foreign Legion (13 DBLE) fought for the Free French.
