= Hermann von Oppeln-Bronikowski =

German general (1899–1966)

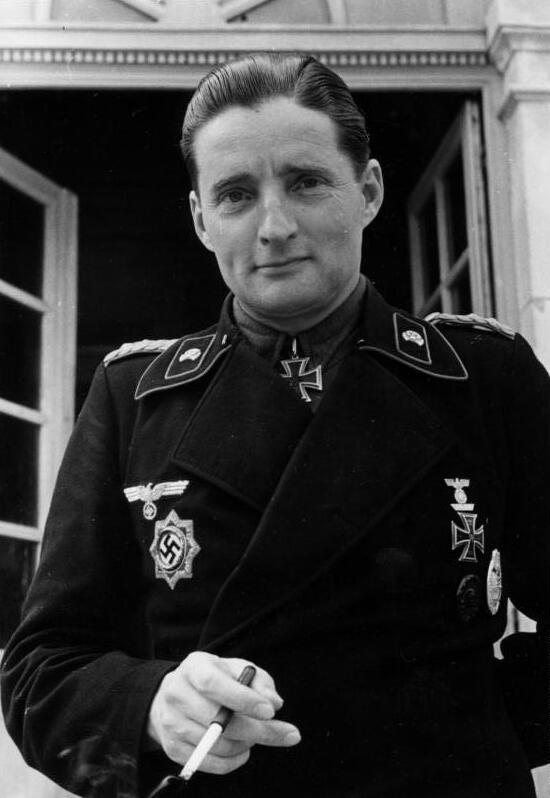
- Oppeln-Bronikowski in 1944
- Born: 2 January 1899; Berlin, Kingdom of Prussia, German Empire
- Died: 19 September 1966 (aged 67); Gaißach, Bavaria, West Germany
- Military career
- Allegiance: German Empire; Weimar Republic; Nazi Germany
- Rank: Generalmajor
- Commands: 20th Panzer Division
- Conflicts: World War I World War II
- Awards: Knight's Cross of the Iron Cross with Oak Leaves and Swords
- Sports career
- Country: Nazi Germany
- Sport: Equestrian
Medal record
Equestrian
Representing Germany
Olympic Games
Gold medal – first place	1936 Berlin	Team dressage

Hermann Leopold August von Oppeln-Bronikowski (2 January 1899 – 19 September 1966) was an Olympic equestrian, winning a gold medal in the team dressage at the 1936 Olympics. He later served as a panzer general during World War II.

As a lieutenant during World War I, he was awarded the Iron Cross in 1918.

During World War II, he served with distinction in Poland in 1939 and then on the Russian Front, commanding several tanks that were knocked out and personally leading several ad hoc attacks.

Oppeln-Bronikowski led the desperate attack of the 22nd Panzer Division on 19 November 1942 in an attempt to forestall the encirclement of German forces in Stalingrad.

He was considered an excellent panzer commander, but had problems with higher authority as he was an excessive drinker. In one particular instance, as an Oberst commanding the 100th Panzer Division at Falaise, France; he was visited at 8:15 in the morning on 11 May 1944 by Rommel, who was satisfied with the forces' defensive preparations, but said to him – You lazy stinkers, what happens if the enemy invasion begins before 8:30! Oppeln-Bronikowski, who had gone to sleep in his now crumpled and tobacco-smelling uniform, and still had alcohol on his breath, could only reply Catastrophe and Rommel laughed. Oppeln-Bronikowski led a panzer counter-attack on the invading forces immediately after the D-Day Invasion, and was told by his commanding officer that if he did not throw the British back into the sea, the war would be lost. Some of his tanks managed to reach the coast, but were soon forced to withdraw, with the counter-attack subsequently failing. D-Day was the major turning point of the war on the Western front.

He commanded the 20th Panzer Division and was awarded the Knight's Cross of the Iron Cross with Oak Leaves and Swords.

He was among Cornelius Ryan's interviewees when Ryan was preparing The Longest Day.

He died of a heart attack in 1966.

== Awards ==
- Iron Cross (1914) 2nd Class (28 May 1918) & 1st Class (14 October 1918)
- Clasp to the Iron Cross (1939) 2nd Class (25 September 1939) & 1st Class (10 November 1939)
- German Cross in Gold on 7 August 1943 as Oberst in Panzer-Regiment 11
- Knight's Cross of the Iron Cross with Oak Leaves and Swords
  - Knight's Cross on 1 January 1943 as Oberst and commander of Panzer-Regiment 204
  - Oak Leaves on 28 July 1944 as Oberst and commander of Panzer-Regiment 22
  - Swords on 17 April 1945 as Generalmajor and commander of the 20. Panzer-Division

Military offices
Preceded by General der Panzertruppe Mortimer von Kessel	Commander of 20th Panzer Division; November 6, 1944-May 8, 1945	Succeeded by none
