= Werner Marcks =

- Born: 17 July 1896
- Died: 28 July 1967 (aged 71)
- Military career
- Allegiance: German Empire; Weimar Republic; Nazi Germany
- Branch: German Army
- Service years: 1914–1945
- Rank: Generalleutnant
- Commands: 1st Panzer Division; 20th Panzer Division; 21st Panzer Division; 90th Light Infantry Division
- Conflicts: World War I; World War II; Invasion of Poland; Battle of France; Operation Barbarossa; Battle of Uman; Battle of Kiev (1941); North African Campaign; Lvov–Sandomierz Offensive; Vistula-Oder Offensive; Battle of Halbe
- Awards: Knight's Cross of the Iron Cross with Oak Leaves

Werner Marcks (17 July 1896 – 28 July 1967) was a German general in the Wehrmacht during World War II who commanded several armoured divisions. He was a recipient of the Knight's Cross of the Iron Cross with Oak Leaves.

== Awards and decorations ==
- Iron Cross (1914) 2nd Class (28 May 1915) & 1st Class (22 February 1918)
- Clasp to the Iron Cross (1939) 2nd Class (14 September 1939) & 1st Class (16 October 1939)
- German Cross in Gold on 11 December 1941 as Oberstleutnant in the I./Schützen-Regiment 64
- Knight's Cross of the Iron Cross with Oak Leaves
  - Knight's Cross on 2 February 1942 as Oberstleutnant and commander of Kampfgruppe Marcks
  - 593rd Oak Leaves on 21 September 1944 as Generalmajor and commander of 1. Panzer Division
- Medaglia d'Argento al Valore Militare

Military offices
Preceded by Generalleutnant Mortimer von Kessel	Commander of 20. Panzer Division; 1 January 1944 – 1 February 1944	Succeeded by Generalleutnant Mortimer von Kessel
Preceded by Generalmajor Richard Koll	Commander of 1. Panzer Division; 19 February 1944 – 25 September 1944	Succeeded by Generalleutnant Eberhard Thunert
Preceded by Oberst Helmut Zollenkopf	Commander of 21. Panzer Division; 12 February 1945 – 8 May 1945	Succeeded by None
