= Mortimer von Kessel =

German Army General (1893 - 1981)

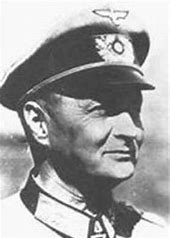
- Born: 25 May 1893; Arnswalde, German Empire
- Died: 8 January 1981 (aged 87); Goslar, West Germany
- Military career
- Allegiance: German Empire; Weimar Republic; Nazi Germany
- Branch: German Army
- Service years: 1914–1945
- Rank: General der Panzertruppe
- Commands: 20th Panzer Division; Head of the Army Personnel Department; VII Panzer Corps
- Conflicts: World War I World War II
- Awards: Knight's Cross of the Iron Cross with Oak Leaves

Mortimer von Kessel (25 May 1893 – 8 January 1981) was a German general in the Wehrmacht during the Second World War. He was also a recipient of the Knight's Cross of the Iron Cross with Oak Leaves of Nazi Germany.

== Biography ==
Kessel joined the Imperial German Army in August 1914 and was then retained in the Reichswehr following World War I. He led a reconnaissance regiment during the Invasion of Poland in 1939. Promoted to Oberst in October that year, he was appointed as the head of the Army Personnel Department and remained in this post until January 1943. In May 1943 he was appointed as the commander of the 20th Panzer Division.

On 28 December 1943, he was awarded the Knight's Cross of the Iron Cross for his actions in the Vitebsk region on the Eastern Front. Then for his actions during the Soviet 1944 summer offensive, Operation Bagration, he was awarded the Oak Leaves to the Knight's Cross. In December 1944, he was appointed commander of the VII Panzer Corps in East Prussia with which he surrendered at the end of the war.

== Awards ==
- Iron Cross (1914) 2nd Class (27 March 1915) & 1st Class (25 September 1917)
- Knight's Cross of the Second Class of the Order of the White Falcon with Swords
- Clasp to the Iron Cross (1939) 2nd Class (5 July 1943) & 1st Class (23 July 1943)
- Knight's Cross of the Iron Cross with Oak Leaves
  - Knight's Cross on 28 December 1943 as Generalmajor and commander of 20. Panzer-Division
  - 611th Oak Leaves on 16 October 1944 as Generalleutnant and commander of 20. Panzer-Division

Military offices
Preceded by Generalmajor Heinrich Freiherr von Lüttwitz	Commander of 20th Panzer Division; 12 May 1943 – 1 January 1944	Succeeded by Oberst Werner Marcks
Preceded by Oberst Werner Marcks	Commander of 20th Panzer Division; 2 February 1944 – 5 November 1944	Succeeded by Oberst Hermann von Oppeln-Bronikowski
Preceded by None	Commander of VII Panzer Corps; 18 December 1944 – 8 May 1945	Succeeded by None
