= VII Panzer Corps =

German military corps in World War II

- Active: 18 December 1944 – 8 May 1945
- Country: Nazi Germany
- Branch: Army
- Type: Panzer corps
- Role: Armoured warfare
- Size: Corps

Commanders
- Notable commanders: General der Panzertruppe Mortimer von Kessel

The VII Panzer Corps (VII Panzerkorps, 7th Armoured Corps) was a panzer corps of Nazi Germany during World War II.

== History ==
The headquarters were formed in East Prussia from the disbanded 49th Infantry Division under Army Group Centre on 18 December 1944.
In February it fought under the 2nd Army, as part of Army Group Vistula and participated in the defence against the Soviet East Pomeranian Offensive.

The Corps was commanded during its existence by General Mortimer von Kessel.

== Order of battle ==
26 January 1945:

- Panzergrenadier Division Großdeutschland
- 24th Panzer Division
- 299th Infantry Division
- 18th Panzergrenadier Division
- 23rd Infantry Division

1 March 1945:

- 4th SS Polizei Panzergrenadier Division
- 7th Panzer Division

== Sources ==
- VII. Panzerkorps on lexikon-der-wehrmacht.de
