= 1st Panzer Division (Wehrmacht) =

German army division during World War II

- 1. Panzer-Division; — 1. Pz.Div. — XX
- Unit insignia (Oak leaf)
- Active: 15 October 1935 – 8 May 1945
- Country: Germany
- Branch: German Army
- Type: Panzer
- Role: Armored warfare
- Size: Division
- Garrison/HQ: Wehrkreis IX: Weimar
- Engagements: World War II; Invasion of Poland; Battle of France; Operation Barbarossa; Battle of Moscow; Battle of Korsun–Cherkassy; Kamenets–Podolsky pocket; Siege of Budapest

Commanders
- Notable commanders: Maximilian von Weichs

Insignia
- 1935–1940 and 1943–1945

The 1st Panzer-Division (short: 1. Pz.Div. German: 1. Panzer-Division, English: 1st Tank Division) was an armoured division in the German Army during World War II.

The division was one of the original three tank divisions established by Germany in 1935. It took part in pre-war occupations of Austria and Czechoslovakia and the invasions of Poland in 1939 and Belgium and France in 1940. From 1941 to 1945, it fought on the Eastern Front, except for a period in 1943 when it was sent for refitting to France and Greece. At the end of the war, the division surrendered to US forces in Bavaria.

== History ==
The 1st Panzer Division was formed on 15 October 1935 from the 3rd Cavalry Division, and was headquartered in Weimar. It was one of three tank divisions created at the time, the other two being the 2nd and 3rd Panzer Division. Earlier in the year, Germany had renounced the Treaty of Versailles, which had forbidden the country, among other things, from having tank forces, a treaty Germany had violated almost from the start by secretly developing tanks and operating a covert tank school in the Soviet Union.

Initially, the division consisted of two panzer regiments organized into a brigade, a motorized infantry brigade, a reconnaissance battalion, a divisional artillery regiment, and supporting ancillary formations. The division was equipped with the light Panzer I and Panzer II tanks, with the very first pre-production versions of the more powerful Panzer III Ausf A. arriving by November 1937 for testing, and the first examples of the Panzer IV Ausf. A being delivered from around the same time, and by June 1938 by the latest. While the Pz I saw service in large numbers in Poland in 1939, the division was still using its Panzer II's in 1941.

In 1938, the division participated in the Anschluss of Austria and the occupation of the Sudetenland in 1938 and the subsequent invasion of Czechoslovakia in 1939. In September 1939, the 1st Panzer Division took part in the invasion of Poland, reaching the outskirts of Warsaw after eight days. After Warsaw the division was moved to support the 18th Infantry Division before returning to Germany in November 1939, after the Polish surrender.

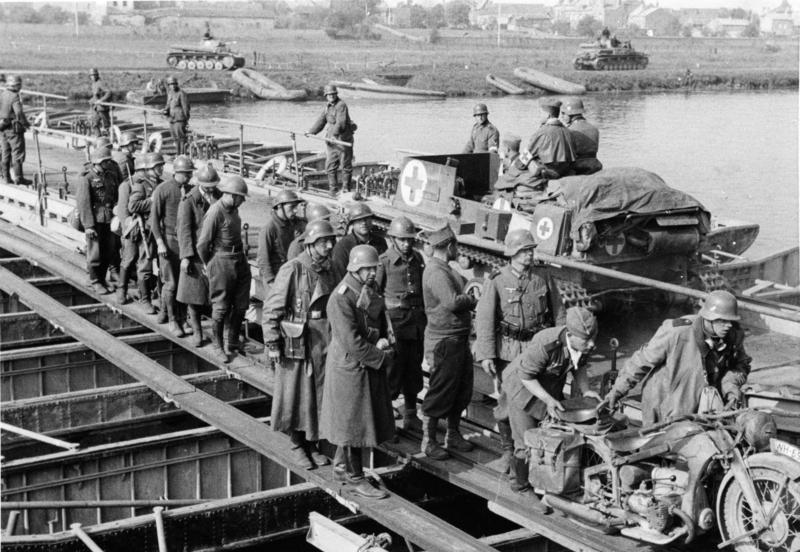
Elements of the division crossing the Meuse near Sedan with POWs, May 1940.

In May 1940, the 1st Panzer Division was part of the invasion of France, Luxembourg and Belgium. It took part in the battles of Sedan and Dunkirk before swinging south to participate in the attack on the Weygand Line. It advanced towards the Swiss border and occupied Belfort before the surrender of France. During the battle of France, the division suffered relatively low casualties, having just under 500 men killed in action.

The 1st Panzer Division remained in France until September 1940, when it was moved to East Prussia. It supplied a substantial number of units to the new 16th and 18th Panzer Divisions. From 22 June 1941, it took part of Operation Barbarossa, crossing the former German-Lithuanian frontier as part of the Army Group North and the 4th Panzer Group. The division was involved in heavy fighting and, by mid-August, had only 44, of the 155 tanks it had started out with less than two month earlier, left in serviceable condition. It continued to advance towards Leningrad until early October when it was transferred to the Army Group Centre to take part in the advance on Moscow. The division advanced within 32 kilometres (20 mi) on Moscow before being forced to retreat during the Soviet counterattack.

The division was part of the defence of the Rzhev Salient during early 1942, initially being very short on tanks and fighting predominantly as infantry until being resupplied during spring. The 1st Panzer Division was engaged in the defence of the supply lines of the 9th Army in the centre of the Eastern Front. It suffered heavy casualties during the defence against repeated Soviet attacks in the Winter of 1942–43 before eventually being transferred back to France in January 1943 for refitting. After months in northern France, the division was sent to occupied Greece in June 1943 because of the perceived threat of an Allied landing there. Instead, the landing took place in Sicily and the division participated in the disarming of Italian forces in Greece when the former defected from the Axis in September 1943. The 1st Panzer Division was brought up to full strength again in October when it received a substantial number of Panther tanks and returned to the Eastern Front again shortly thereafter.

On 20 November 1943, the 1st Panzer Division possessed 140 operational tanks, making it the second-best equipped armored division, behind only 1st SS Panzer Division with 155 tanks.

The 1st Panzer Division was engaged in the southern sector of the Eastern Front to serve alternately within the 1st and 4th Panzer Army as an emergency force. It was constantly thrown from crisis location to crisis location as the German front lines retreated, taking part in battles at Kiev, Zhitomir and Cherkassy. The latter battle saw the division attempting to break through to the cauldron but falling just short. By March 1944, the division had been reduced to just over 25 percent of its nominal strength. Retreating further westwards, the division was part of the Kamenets-Podolsky pocket and, from there, took part in the defence of eastern Poland and Hungary. It was engaged in defensive operations around Lake Balaton and took part in the unsuccessful attempt to break through to the Siege of Budapest and once more suffered heavy losses.

The final month of the Second World War saw the division engaged in the defence of Styria. From there, it retreated westwards to surrender to US forces rather than Soviet ones, successfully crossing the demarcation line between the two. It surrendered on 8 May 1945 in southern Bavaria and most of its soldiers were released from captivity soon after.

== Commanders ==
The commanders of the division:

- 10 January 1935 – 30 September 1937: General der Kavallerie Maximilian von Weichs
- 10 January 1937 – 2 November 1939: Generalleutnant Rudolf Schmidt
- 2 November 1939– 17 July 1941: Generalleutnant Friedrich Kirchner
- 17 July 1941 – 1 January 1944: Generalleutnant Walter Krüger
- 1 January 1944 – 19 February 1944: Generalmajor Richard Koll
- 19 February 1944 – 25 September 1944: Generalmajor Werner Marcks
- 25 September 1944 – 8 May 1945: Generalleutnant Eberhard Thunert

== Organization ==
The organisation of the division:

- 1. Panzer-Brigade
  - Panzer-Regiment 1
    - Panzer-Abteilung I (deleted July 1941; added Jan 1943)
    - Panzer-Abteilung II
  - Panzer-Regiment 2 (deleted Oct 1940)
    - Panzer-Abteilung I
    - Panzer-Abteilung II
- 1. Schützen-Brigade
  - Schützen-Regiment 1 (renamed Panzergrenadier-Regiment 1 Jul 1941)
    - Schützen-Battalion I
    - Schützen-Battalion II
    - Schützen-Battalion III (added Oct 1939, deleted Nov 1940)
  - Schützen-Regiment 113 (renamed Panzergrenadier-Regiment 113 Jul 1941)
    - Schützen-Battalion I (added Nov 1940)
    - Schützen-Battalion II (added Feb 1941)
  - Kradschützen-Battalion 1 – Motorcycle battalion
- Artillerie-Regiment 73
  - Artillerie-Abteilung I
  - Artillerie-Abteilung II
  - Artillerie-Abteilung III (added 1941)
- Aufklärungs-Abteilung 4 – Reconnaissance battalion
- Panzerjäger-Abteilung 37 – Tank hunter battalion
- Heeres-Flak-Abteilung 299 – Air defense battalion (added 1943)
- Pionier-Battalion 37 – Pioneer battalion
- Grenadier-Ersatz-Abteilung 1009 – Replacement infantry battalion (added 1944 or 1945)
- Nachrichten-Abteilung 37 – Signals battalion
