= Ernst Tiburzy =

German Volkssturm-Bataillonsführer

- Born: 26 December 1911; Drosdowen, Johannisburg district, East Prussia
- Died: 14 November 2004 (aged 92); Papenburg
- Military career
- Allegiance: Nazi Germany
- Branch: Volkssturm
- Rank: Battalion Commander/Major
- Commands: Volkssturm-Btl. 25/82 in fortress Königsberg
- Conflicts: World War II
- Awards: Knight's Cross of the Iron Cross and the 1939 Iron Cross first class

Ernst Tiburzy (26 December 1911 – 14 November 2004) was a German Volkssturm ("Peoples Assault") member during World War II. He received the Knight's Cross of the Iron Cross for his performance, fighting alone and destroying five T-34s with Panzerfausts during the defense of Königsberg on February 10, 1945. He is one of only four Volkssturm members to have been awarded the Knight's Cross of the Iron Cross.

During the Battle of Königsberg, Tiburzy served as a Volkssturm battalion commander.

On 10 February 1945 he was credited with destroying five T‑34 tanks with the Panzerfaust and subsequently received the Knight’s Cross of the Iron Cross.

In a speech reproduced by Otto Lasch, local Nazi Party official Ernst Wagner cited Tiburzy as an example to the city’s defenders, stating that Tiburzy had shot a platoon commander who “cowardly went back with his men” and then, together with the remaining men, drove the Soviet troops from their position.

Bastiaan Willems interprets this episode as illustrative of how late‑war Nazi authorities praised “fanatics” for using lethal force against perceived defeatism within their own ranks, holding up Tiburzy as a Volkssturm hero both for tank destruction and for shooting a superior officer who had ordered a retreat.

Tiburzy was an experienced soldier having been invalidated out of the Wehrmacht after suffering severe wounds earlier in the war including the loss of an eye.
