= 3rd Cavalry Division (Reichswehr) =

- 3. Kavallerie-Division
- Active: 1921–1934
- Disbanded: October 1934
- Country: Weimar Republic
- Branch: Reichsheer
- Type: Cavalry
- Size: Division
- Part of: Gruppenkommando 2
- Garrison/HQ: Weimar

Commanders
- Notable commanders: Maximilian von Weichs

The 3rd Cavalry Division (3. Kavallerie-Division) was a unit of the Reichswehr, the armed forces of Germany during the Weimar Republic. It consisted of 6 cavalry regiments, the 13th (Prussian), 14th, 15th, 16th, 17th (Bavarian), and 18th (Saxon) Cavalry Regiments. It was subordinated to Gruppenkommando 2.

== Divisional commanders ==
- Generalleutnant Heinrich von Hofmann (1 June 1920 - 1 October 1920)
- Generalleutnant Johannes Koch (1 October 1920 - 16 June 1921)
- Generalleutnant Eginhard Eschborn (16 June 1921 - 30 September 1923)
- General der Kavallerie Paul Hasse (1 October 1923 - 28 February 1926)
- Generalleutnant Hans von Viereck (1 March 1926 - 1 March 1929)
- Generalleutnant Curt Freiherr von Gienanth (1 March 1929 - 1 November 1931)
- Generalmajor Wilhelm Knochenhauer (1 November 1931 - 1 December 1933)
- Generalleutnant Maximilian von Weichs (1 December 1933 - 15 October 1935)

== Garrison ==
The divisional headquarters was in Weimar.
