= Eberhard Thunert =

German general

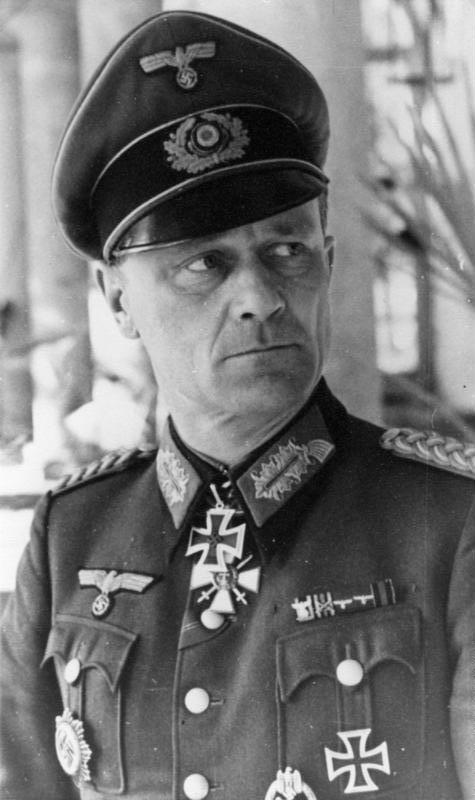
- Thunert in 1945
- Born: 22 November 1899; Kulmsee
- Died: 4 May 1964 (aged 64); Wuppertal
- Military career
- Allegiance: German Empire; Weimar Republic; Nazi Germany
- Branch: German Army
- Service years: 1918–1945
- Rank: Generalleutnant
- Commands: 1st Panzer Division
- Conflicts: World War I; World War II; Invasion of Poland; Battle of France; Battle of Greece; Operation Barbarossa; Battle of Uman; Battle of Kiev (1941); Battle of Rostov (1941); Battle of Stalingrad; Operation Overlord; Battle of Debrecen; Budapest Offensive; Operation Konrad; Operation Frühlingserwachen
- Awards: Knight's Cross of the Iron Cross

Eberhard Thunert (22 November 1899 – 4 May 1964) was a German general during World War II who commanded the 1st Panzer Division. He was a recipient of the Knight's Cross of the Iron Cross.

== Awards and decorations ==
- Iron Cross (1914) 2nd Class
- Wound Badge (1918) in Black
- Iron Cross (1939)
  - 2nd Class (18 September 1939)
  - 1st Class (14 May 1940)
- Wound Badge (1939) in Gold
- German Cross in Gold (24 January 1943)
- Knight's Cross of the Iron Cross on 1 February 1945 as Generalmajor and commander of 1 Panzer-Division
- Order of Merit of the Kingdom of Hungary Commander's Cross on war ribbon and swords (1945)

Military offices
Preceded by Generalmajor Werner Marcks	Commander of 1. Panzer-Division; 25 September 1944 - 8 May 1945	Succeeded by none
