= 90th Light Infantry Division =

Light infantry division of the German Army during World War II

90th Light Afrika Division 90th Panzergrenadier Division
- 90. leichte Afrika-Division; 90. Panzergrenadier-Division
- 1st insignia of 90th Light Div.
- Active: August 1941 – May 1943; July 1943 – April 1945
- Country: Nazi Germany
- Branch: Army
- Type: Infantry
- Role: Light infantry Panzergrenadier; Grenadier
- Size: Division
- Engagements: North African Campaign; Italian Campaign

Insignia

The 90th Light Infantry Division was a light infantry division of the German Army during World War II that served in North Africa as well as Sardinia and Italy. The division played a major role in most of the actions against the British Eighth Army in the Western Desert Campaign and eventually surrendered to the Allies in the final stages of the Tunisia Campaign in May 1943. It was re-constituted later in 1943 and deployed to Sardinia and when the expected Allied invasion of Sardinia failed to materialise, the division was moved to Italy. It was engaged in actions against the Allies in Italy from 1943 to April 1945 when the division was listed as "destroyed" in the Po River valley.

== Formation ==
On 26 June 1941, the OKH ordered the creation of a Division HQ staff for Kommando zbV Afrika in Germany. The planned division was intended for deployment to Africa to re-balance, and add infantry troops to the Afrika Korps deployed in the Western Desert. The formation headquarters was sent to Africa between late August and mid-September 1941 and deployed to command the Sollum area with the first units (347th Infantry Regiment and 300th Special Services "Oasis" Battalion) being attached on 15 October 1941. On 20 October more units were attached (155th Inf Regt, 900th Engineer Battalion and 605th Anti-Tank Battalion) and the division troops were expanded to full strength with the division becoming known as Division z.b.V. Afrika (Note: The abbreviation z.b.V. stands for zur besonderen Verwendung, which translates as "for a special use" in English.)

The subordinated 288th Special Service Unit, originally known as Sonderverband 288 was a regimental sized, special operations unit consisting of sub-units with various combat specialties including mountain and desert warfare, night operations and infiltration. This unit was formed in Potsdam in 1941 from specialist soldiers with previous experience in the deserts of the Middle East and North Africa. Three battalions from Sonderverbande 288 battalion were later amalgamated to form the 155th Rifle (later 155th Infantry and then Panzergrenadier) Regiment within the division. The 361st Regiment contained 300 Germans who had previously served in the French Foreign Legion; who were usually considered unworthy of service but brought about by the Wehrmacht's incessant need for additional troops.

Training was completed in the Bardia area and the division was earmarked by Rommel to lead the attack on Tobruk. On 28 November 1941, the formation was renamed 90. leichte Afrika Division (90th Light Africa Division). Through its five-year existence, it was re-designated several times, although always known colloquially as the Africa Division, being the only German combat division to have been largely raised in Africa itself.

The Germans combed the French Foreign Legion in French North Africa and press-ganged some 2,000 German légionnaires into the Wehrmacht. Germans had been urged by the Nazi regime not to join the Legion and these recalcitrants were given a rough reception as unpatriotic elements, being classified Wehrunwürdig/999. The 999 units were made up of men seen as not "worthy to serve" (Wehrunwürdig), so they were not condemned in a court; these men were assigned mainly for political reasons. The bulk of these légionnaires would be formed into the 361st Infantry Regiment as part of the 90th Afrika Division.

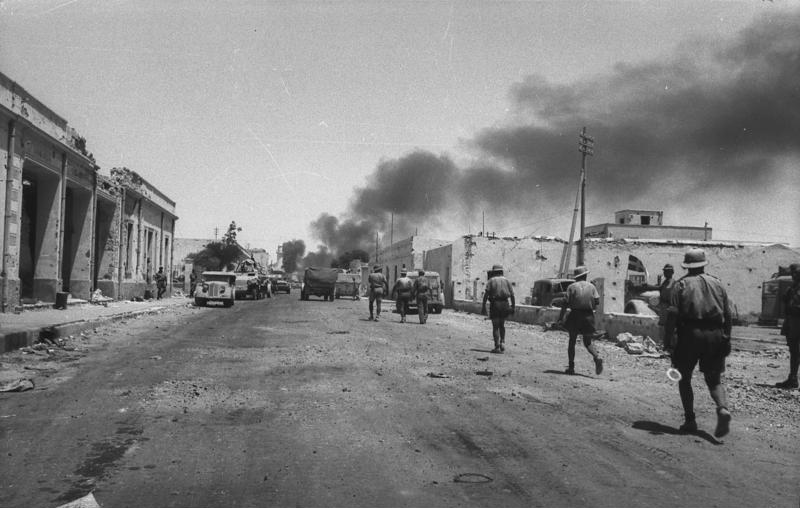
Afrika Korps infantrymen enter Tobruk after the Allied collapse in June 1942

== North African campaign ==
The 90th was involved in the battles related to Operation Crusader in 1942 and later in the battles of Bir Hakeim as well as the First and Second battles of El Alamein.

=== Final battles in Tunisia ===
In Tunisia, the 90th were initially involved in the Battle of El Guettar. The 90th Light was regarded by the 2nd New Zealand Division, commanded by Lieutenant-General Sir Bernard C. Freyberg VC, as their special foe and as the two formations had faced each other on several occasions. In the final confrontation with the 90th Light in May 1943, Freyberg had sent a message to the German Division stating "your position is hopeless. We have fought you for two years and have no wish to annihilate you." The reply was "We appreciate your message and we realise our position is hopeless; but we have our duty to perform." A direct assault by the New Zealand Division was checked and a later attack by the 167th Bde of 56th (London) Infantry Division was also halted by the 90th Light with British casualties being 63 dead, 221 wounded and 104 missing. The 90th Light continued to resist attacks by the 56th Division but finally succumbed to attack by the 6th Armoured Division as well as immense air attacks from the South African and Royal Air Forces. The Division was finally overrun at 18:45 on 12 May 1943 and was granted an honourable surrender at 12:30 on 13 May 1943 together with all remaining Axis forces at Cap Bon, marking the end of the Tunisia Campaign.

== Italian Campaign ==
=== Reconstitution ===
As with the other units of the Panzer Army Africa, replacement units were quickly raised from available troops stationed in Western Europe. As such, the Africa Division was reconstituted as the 90th Panzergrenadier Division in Sardinia during July 1943 drawing an experienced nucleus of troops from the Division Sardinia. The division was then transferred to Corsica where it absorbed the ground organisation of the Luftwaffe command on Corsica and added regulars coming from Volksdeutsche recruits. The reconstituted division was deployed along the Bonifacio—Bastia coastal road on 9 September 1943, where it was involved in battles against Italians, the maquis, and French troops for the liberation of Corsica. The division was transferred to the Italian mainland from the Bastia bridgehead on 3 October 1943 and assigned to LXXXVII Corps of Army Group C.

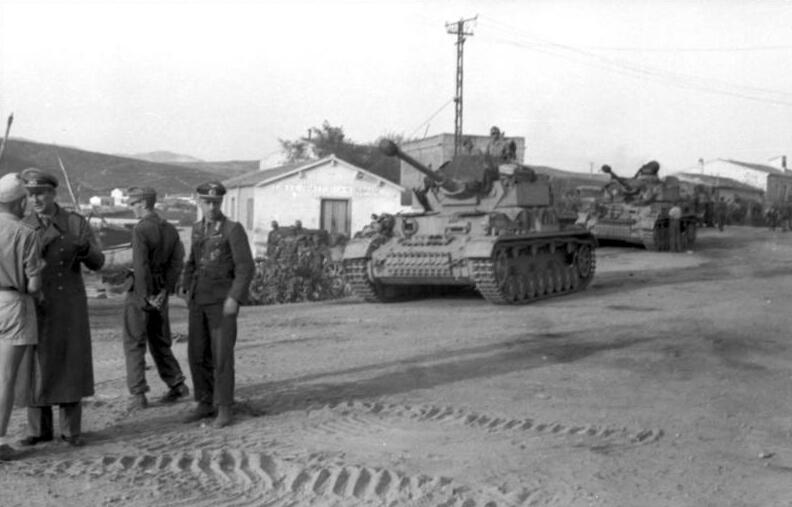
Panzer IV of the 90th Panzergrenadier Division in the marina of Palau on their withdrawal from Sardinia.

=== Southern Italy ===
On arrival in Italy, the 90th was deployed in Tuscany close to Pisa and then moved to Gatteo a Mare on the Adriatic coast and in mid November to the Abruzzo region, as part of the Gustav Line defences. It was here that the division faced its first damaging battle in Italy during the bitter fighting with the 1st Canadian Infantry Division during the Moro River Campaign in late November 1943 and the Battle of Ortona in December. In late December the division was moved to the south of Rome in order to replenish and recover from these battles under LXXVI Panzer Corps.

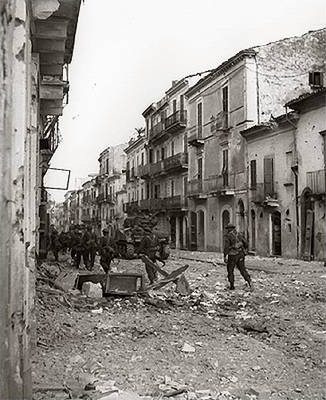
Remnants of the town of Ortona in which the 90th fought in November 1943

=== Monte Cassino ===
The 29th and 90th Divisions had been moved from the Rome defences to Monte Cassino to bolster the southern defensive Gustav Line in January 1944 as a division assigned to I Parachute Corps. This move was encouraged by Adm Wilhelm Canaris assuring Field Marshal Kesselring that there was no possibility of any Allied landings close to Rome (The virtually unopposed Anzio landings took place two weeks later on 22 January 1944). The 90th thus remained in the Casino defence lines and didn't participate in the Anzio battles. On 3 February, Kesselring instructed the whole 1st Parachute Division to be moved from the Adriatic to Cassino to relieve the 90th Division. The 90th would then move to the Adriatic to fill the gap in the 51st Mountain Corps left by the relocation of the parachute division. This proposed move was strongly opposed by the Corps generals who insisted that the 90th was just beginning to make itself felt at Cassino. The Corps staff prevailed and the 90th went into battle to following day. The 90th was involved in the defence of Monte Cassino during the first Battle of Monte Casino and lead the recapture of Monte Calvari from the American 2nd Brigade of 168th Infantry Division on 7 February 1944. (Note: The division strength was 8,017 on 6 February 1944 (Molony 2004, p. 700n)) During the second Battle of Monte Casino on 17 February 1944, the 90th was attacked by New Zealand Corps and defended their positions against the Indian 4th Division. Close hand-to-hand combat ensued and the Indian Division launched three attacks against the 90th defences. Battles raged around the abbey for an additional three days after which Gen Freyberg called off the corps attack. The 90th was relieved in the Cassino line after the second battle for Cassino by the 1st Parachute Division and were moved to join the 51st Mountain Corps after refitting at Frosinone. On 18 May, when the 90th reached the Hitler Line, it was transferred from 51st Mountain Corps to fall under the command of 14th Panzer Corps and deployed in the Pignataro - Pontecorvo area. This was done to allow one Corps commander to command forces on both sides of the Liri River and prevailed until 21 May, when the 90th reverted to the command of 51st Mountain Corps. The 90th was then involved in the fourth battle for Monte Cassino.

=== Defense of Rome ===
By 1 June, Kesselring tried to concentrate the 90th, the 1st Parachute, 305th Infantry and 94th Infantry divisions into a defensive line between Piglio and Paliano. But by then, these units were very weak and were constantly in contact with Allied forces, making relocation extremely difficult. By 4 June, the 90th were again fighting rear-guard actions on the line Ponte Orsino - Trevi and had retreated further north. At the end of July 1944, the division was again relocated into the Po Valley between Modena and Parma and then to Liguria north of Genoa to re-group. After the Allied landings in southern France, the division was relocated to Piedmont to secure the border of the Alpine crossings from France into Italy.

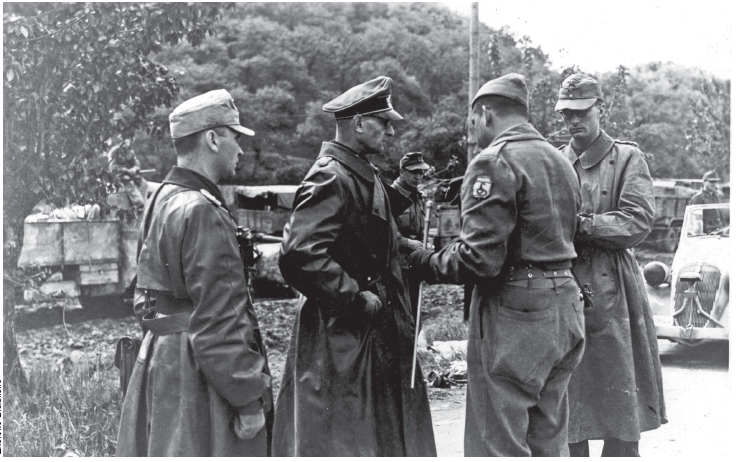
German forces surrendering to the Brazilian Expeditionary Force: April 1945

=== Bologna and the Po Valley ===
By 15 October the division had been withdrawn from Piedmont in orchestrated disengagement manoeuvres and was deployed as part of a defensive line in the Abruzzi Mountains as part of 10. Armee. By November 1944 the division had withdrawn north and formed part of the defensive lines covering the advances to Bologna. By this time, the division’s infantry battalions were considered fortunate if they had more than 200 men. After a series of retreating battles into March 1945, the 90th was assigned as Field Army Group reserve under command of Heeresgruppe C. and put into reserve for rebuilding. The reserve was committed to battle in April 1945 to attempt to halt a breakthrough by the US 10th Mountain Division on the Po defence line but were unable to hold the advancing Allied forces. Reportedly, when elements of the 10th Mountain entered Tole, they found the commanding general had fled his headquarters in that mountain town "in such haste he'd left on the table a fresh piece of bread and jam, with one bite missing."

=== Surrender ===
By 25 April the US 5th Army had five divisions over the Po River and IV (US) Corps crossed Lake Garda using Fantails and Duplex Drive tanks to push west to close the Brenner Pass escape road and to secure Milan. By 28 April all passes providing a possibility of escape into Austria had been closed and the 90th made a last great effort to keep these escape routes open for the divisions in the west. The 90th was forced to surrender on 28 April 1945 after the divisional commander and his staff had been captured earlier in the day, with the remnants of the division surrendering to the Brazilian Expeditionary Force (FEB) on the Via Emilia near Collecchio.

General Sir W Jackson, the government historian responsible for documenting the British official history of the War in Italy, considered the 90th Panzergrenadier Division a "worthy opponent."

== War crimes ==
The division has been implicated in a number of war crimes in Italy between August 1944 and April 1945, with up to five civilians executed in each incident.

== Lineage and organisation ==
The division formed part of the Panzer Army Africa during its deployment to North Africa.

Division z.b.V. Africa (Note: Division z.b.V. Africa translates to African Special Service Division)	Period in existence: July – 28 November 1941	
Commanders:	Major General Max Sümmermann	17 July – 28 November 1941
Order of Battle (Note: Order of battle as at 10 November 1941.)
155th Rifle Regiment	361st Reinforced Africa Regiment	255th Infantry Regiment
347th Infantry Regiment	300th Special Use 'Oasis' Battalion	605th Anti Tank Battalion
900th (Mot) Engineer Battalion (Note: (Mot) indicates motorised infantry.)		2nd Fast Artillery Regiment "Emanuele Filiberto Testa di Ferro"
90th Light Infantry Division	Period in existence: 28 November 1941 – March 1942	
Commanders:	Major General Max Sümmermann †	28 November – 10 December 1941
Commanders:	Colonel Johann Mickl	11–27 December 1941
Commanders:	Major General Richard Veith	28 December 1941 – March 1942
Order of Battle
155th (Mot) Infantry Regiment (Note: Formed from Sonderverbande 288)	200th (Mot) Infantry Regiment	361st (Mot) Africa Infantry Regiment (Note: Contained at least 300 French Foreign Legionnaires.)
361st Artillery Battalion	190th Anti Tank Battalion	2nd Fast Artillery Regiment "Emanuele Filiberto Testa di Ferro"
90th Light Africa Division (Note: Name was changed effective from 26 July 1942)	Period in existence: March 1942 – May 1943	
Commanders:	Major General Richard Veith	March – 28 April 1942
Commanders:	Major General Ulrich Kleemann	29 April – 14 June 1942
Commanders:	Colonel Werner Marcks	14–18 June 1942
Commanders:	Colonel Erwin Menny	18–19 June 1942
Commanders:	Colonel Werner Marcks	19–21 June 1942
Commanders:	Major General Ulrich Kleemann	21 June – 8 September 1942
Commanders:	Major General Hermann-Bernhard Ramcke	8–17 September 1942
Commanders:	Colonel Hermann Schulte-Heuthaus	17–22 September 1942
Commanders:	Lieutenant General Theodor Graf von Sponeck	22 September 1942 – 12 May 1943
Commanders:	Lieutenant General Carl-Hans Lungershausen	May 1943
Order of Battle (Note: Order of battle as at 10 May 1942.)
155th (Mot) Light Infantry Regiment	200th Light Infantry Regiment	361st Light Infantry Regiment
288th Special Service Regiment	190th Panzer Battalion	361st (Mot) Artillery Battalion
190th (Mot) Artillery Regiment	580th Panzer Reconnaissance Battalion (Note: Later assigned to 21st Panzer Division.)	190th (Mot) Anti Tank Battalion
605th Anti Tank Battalion	900th (Mot) Engineer Battalion	1 × Company 190th Panzer Signals Battalion
606th Anti Aircraft Battalion	90/190th Field Replacement Company (Note: Was assigned to division but was being formed in Germany)	190th Supply Regiment
90th Panzergrenadier Division	Period in existence: July 1943 - April 1945	
Commanders:	Lieutenant General Carl-Hans Lungershausen	July–November 1943
Commanders:	Generalmajoor Ernst-Gunther Baade	December 1943-December 1944
Commanders:	Oberst Heinrich Baron von Behr	27 December-1 April 1945
Order of Battle
155th Panzergrenadier Regiment (Note: Formed from reconstituted 155th Light Infantry Regiment.)	200th Panzergrenadier Regiment	361st Panzergrenadier Regiment
190th Panzer Battalion	190th Artillery Regiment	242nd Sturmgeschütz Battalion (Note: Assigned in October 1943.)
90th Antitank Battalion (Note: Initially, only one company, from October 1943 full battalion was assigned.)	190 Armoured Recce Battalion	90 Engineer Battalion

== Notable Members ==
Prince Claus of the Netherlands

== See also ==
- Western Desert Campaign
- List of German divisions in World War II

== Notes and references ==
=== Bibliography ===
- Battistelli, Pier Paulo (2006). Rommel's Africa Korps. Oxford: Osprey. ISBN 9781841769011.
- Brown, James Ambrose (1974). Eagles Strike: South African Forces in World War II: Volume IV. Johannesburg: Purnell.
- Jackson, Gen. Sir William (2004). The Mediterranean and Middle East: Volume VI: Victory in the Mediterranean Part II: June-October 1944. Uckfield: Naval & Military Press Ltd.
- Jackson (III), Gen. Sir William (2004). The Mediterranean and Middle East: Volume VI: Victory in the Mediterranean Part III: November 1944 - May 1945. Uckfield: Naval & Military Press Ltd.
- Jackson, W.G.F (1967). The Battle for Italy. New York: Harper & Row.
- Kurowski, Franz (2003). Battleground Italy 1943-1945: The German Armed Forces in the battle for the "Boot". J.J. Fedorowicz Publishing, Winnipeg. ISBN 0-921991-77-0.
- Littlejohn, David (1979). Foreign Legions of the Third Reich: Volume 1: Norway, Denmark and France. San Jose: R. James Bender. ISBN 0912138173.
- Mehner, Kurt (1993). Die Deutsche Wehrmacht 1939–1945 (in German). Norderstedt, Germany: Militair-Verlag Klaus D. Patzwall.
- Molony, Brig. C.J.C. (2004). The Mediterranean and Middle East: Volume V: The Campaign in Sicily (1943) and the Campaign in Italy (3rd September 1943 to 31st March 1944). Uckfield: Naval & Military Press Ltd.
- Molony (VI), Brig. C.J.C. (2004). The Mediterranean and Middle East: Volume VI: Victory in the Mediterranean Part I: 1st April to 4th June 1944). Uckfield: Naval & Military Press Ltd.
- Morris, Eric (1993). Circles of Hell: The War in Italy 1943-1945. London: Random House.
- Shores, Christopher F. (1972). Pictorial History of the Mediterranean Air War: Volume I: RAF 1940-43. London: Ian Allan. ISBN 0-7110-0382-3.
- Windrow, Martin (1986). Uniforms of the French Foreign Legion 1831–1981. illustrated by Mike Chappell (rev. ed.). Poole: Blandford. ISBN 0-7137-1914-1.
- Windrow, Martin (1999). French Foreign Legion, 1914–1945. Men at Arms 325. illustrated by Mike Chappell. Oxford: Osprey Military. ISBN 1-85532-761-9.
