= 20th Panzer Division =

German army division during World War II

- 20. Panzer-Division
- Unit insignia
- Active: 15 October 1940 – 8 May 1945
- Country: Germany
- Branch: Army
- Type: Panzer
- Role: Armoured warfare
- Size: Division
- Garrison/HQ: Wehrkreis IX: Jena
- Engagements: World War II; Operation Barbarossa; Battle of Kursk; Operation Bagration

Commanders
- Notable commanders: Hermann von Oppeln-Bronikowski

The 20th Panzer Division (English: 20th Tank Division) was an armoured division in the German Army during World War II. It was created from parts of the 19th Infantry Division.

The division fought exclusively on the Eastern Front, taking part in the battles of Moscow and Kursk. It eventually surrendered to US and Soviet forces in Czechoslovakia in May 1945.

== History ==
The 20th Panzer Division was formed on 15 October 1940 after the decision had been made to weaken the existing German tank divisions to create new ones. The new division drew units from various active and reserve units, among them the 19th Infantry Division which had been converted to a tank division itself, having become the 19th Panzer Division.

Operation Barbarossa, 3 July 1941

Attached to Army Group Center, the division participated in the opening stages of Operation Barbarossa and remained in the front echelon of attack during the series of advances on Minsk, Smolensk and took part in Operation Typhoon, the failed attack on Moscow. It remained on the central front during the winter of 1941–42, engaged in defensive operations and retreat. In March 1942 it was withdrawn to Bryansk for refitting and a rest after heavy casualties during the winter that lead to disbanding of a number of its units.

The 20th Panzer Division, consisting of just one of the nominal three tank battalions, remained in the central sector of the Eastern Front, taking part in the capture of Voronezh in mid-1942 but otherwise engaged in defensive operations. It took part in the defence of Orel in the winter of 1942–43 and, in July 1943, was part of the northern spearhead during the battle of Kursk. The rest of 1943 was spent in a long retreat between Orel, Gomel, Orsha, and Vitebsk.

The 20th Panzer Division spent the winter of 1944 fighting in the Polotsk, Vitebsk, Babruysk and Kholm areas. Having suffered heavy losses during the Red Army's Operation Bagration, the division was sent to Romania for refitting in August 1944. In October, the division was sent to East Prussia, and then sent to Hungary on 6 January 1945, to partake in the Garam (S:Hron) battles raging in northern Hungary. It then retreated through Breslau, Schweinitz and Neisse in Silesia (now part of Poland). The division was transferred to Görlitz (east of Dresden on the post-1945 German frontier with Poland). On 19 April 1945, the division was involved in a counteroffensive west of Görlitz in the direction of Niesky, but disengaged three days later and retreated west. It counterattacked again in the Bautzen area, succeeding in relieving the local garrison at heavy cost to Soviet forces. By 26 April 1945, the division was situated northwest of Dresden; by 6 May it retreated south across the Czechoslovak border. Some divisional elements surrendered to the Red Army near Teplice-Šanov (northwest of Prague), whilst the rest, including elements of Panzer-Aufklärungs-Abteilung 20. surrendered to the U.S. Army at Rokycany (between Prague and Plzeň); they were handed over to the Soviet forces.

== Organization ==
The organisation of the division:

=== 1941 ===
- Schützen-Brigade 20
  - Schützen-Regiment 59
    - Schützen-Battalion I
    - Schützen-Battalion II
  - Schützen-Regiment 112
    - Schützen-Battalion I
    - Schützen-Battalion II
  - Kradschützen-Battalion 20
- Panzer-Regiment 21
  - Panzer-Abteilung I
  - Panzer-Abteilung II
  - Panzer-Abteilung III
- Artillerie-Regiment 92
  - Artillerie-Abteilung I
  - Artillerie-Abteilung II
  - Artillerie-Abteilung III
- Aufklärungs-Abteilung 20
- Panzerjäger-Abteilung 92
- Pionier-Battalion 92
- Nachrichten-Abteilung 92

=== 1942 ===
- Panzergrenadier-Regiment 59
  - Panzergrenadier-Battalion I
  - Panzergrenadier-Battalion II
- Panzergrenadier-Regiment 112
  - Panzergrenadier-Battalion I
  - Panzergrenadier-Battalion II
- Panzer-Regiment 21
  - Panzer-Abteilung I
  - Panzer-Abteilung II
- Panzer-Artillerie-Regiment 92
  - Panzer-Artillerie-Abteilung I
  - Panzer-Artillerie-Abteilung II
  - Panzer-Artillerie-Abteilung III
- Panzer-Aufklärungs-Abteilung 20
- Heeres-Flak-Artillerie-Abteilung 295
- Panzerjäger-Abteilung 92
- Panzer-Pionier-Battalion 92
- Panzer-Nachrichten-Abteilung 92

== Commanding officers ==
The commanders of the division:

- Generalleutnant Horst Stumpff, 13 November 1940 – 10 September 1941
- Oberst Georg von Bismarck, 10 September 1941 – 13 October 1941 (acting)
- Generalmajor Wilhelm Ritter von Thoma, 14 October 1941 – 30 June 1942
- Generalmajor Walter Düvert, 1 July 1942 – 10 October 1942
- Oberst Heinrich Freiherr von Lüttwitz, 10 October 1942 – 30 November 1942 (acting)
- Generalmajor Heinrich Freiherr von Lüttwitz, 1 December 1942 – 11 May 1943
- Generalleutnant Mortimer von Kessel, 12 May 1943 – 1 January 1944
- Oberst Werner Marcks, 1 January 1944 – 1 February 1944 (acting)
- Generalleutnant Mortimer von Kessel, 2 February 1944 – 5 November 1944
- Oberst Hermann von Oppeln-Bronikowski, 6 November 1944 – 31 December 1944 (acting)
- Generalmajor Hermann von Oppeln-Bronikowski, 1 January 1945 – 8 May 1945
