= Theodor Graf von Sponeck =

Theodor von Sponeck (Offenburg, 24 January 1896 – Heidenheim an der Brenz, 13 June 1982) was a German general during World War II.

== Biography ==
Von Sponeck was born into a noble family in Baden. He fought as a lieutenant in the Imperial German Army during World War I.
At the start of World War II, he served as First General Staff Officer of the XV Army Corps. As commander of the 11th Motorized Infantry Regiment, he fought in France, the Balkans and the Soviet Union, until he was wounded on 1 November 1941.
After his recovery in September 1942, he received command of the 90th Light Infantry Division in Northern Africa, and was promoted to Generalmajor on 1 November.

During the Second Battle of El Alamein in October/November 1942, Sponeck and his division were several times successfully deployed at weak points, until he had to retreat to the Fuka position, which was executed in an orderly way. After the Tunisian Campaign, Sponeck had to capitulate with the rest of his division on 12 May 1943 and was taken prisoner of war by the British. He had just been promoted to Generalleutnant. He was released in 1947.

== Sources ==
- leo-bw
