= Tunis Field Battalions =

Tunis Field Battalion (Tunis Feld-Bataillon)
- Active: November 1942 - May 1943
- Disbanded: Capitulated 13 May 1943, officially disbanded 30 June 1943.
- Country: Nazi Germany
- Branch: Army
- Type: Provisional Battalion
- Role: Reserve / Infantry
- Size: 5 Battalions: a 5 Companies with 867 men
- Engagements: World War II: North African Campaign; Tunisia Campaign; Establishment of the Tunis Bridgehead; Defensive Battles West and South of Mateur; Battles for the Expansion of the Tunisian Bridgehead; Defense of Tunisia; Defense of Bizerte

Tunis Field Battalions were German provisional infantry battalions active in 1942–43 in North Africa.

Five Tunis Field Battalions were created between 9 November and 15 November 1942 by renaming a like number of Afrika Marsch-Bataillone (Africa Replacement Draft Battalions) that were originally intended to be used to refill the ranks of Field Marshal Erwin Rommel's battered Africa Corps. These five battalions, Tunis Field Battalions T1, T2, T3, T4 and T5, were instead airlifted from Sicily beginning on 10 November 1942 to help defend the Bizerte and Tunis Bridgeheads in Vichy France-controlled Tunisia.

Not originally conceived as combat units, intended only as replacement pools composed of a variety of specialist as well as combat troops, these Tunis Field Battalions lacked heavy weapons, vehicles, field kitchens and communications equipment. Nevertheless, in the days following the Allied Landings in Northwest Africa (Operation Torch) that began on 8 November 1942, these units, joined by Luftwaffe paratroopers, were all the German High Command had available to seize Tunisian bridgeheads before the Allies got there first. Having won the race for Tunis, the Germans then began protracted defensive warfare in the mountains of western Tunisia, where the Tunis Field Battalions found themselves incorporated into other German divisions that were lacking infantry, including the 10th Panzer Division, the 334th Infantry Division, and the Hermann Göring Division. Two Tunis Field Battalions, T3 and T4, were incorporated into Division von Broich/von Manteuffel; a provisional infantry division formed from a variety of units including Fallschirmjäger, Italian infantry and units scraped together from Rommel's Army. For most of their short service life, these battalions all served in Jürgen von Arnim's Fifth Panzer Army until all were forced to capitulate in Tunisia by 13 May 1943.

== List of Tunis Field Battalions formed from Africa Draft Replacement Battalions ==
Tunis Field-Battalion T1, assigned to Division von Broich/von Manteuffel, formed from Africa Draft Replacement Battalion A16

Tunis Field-Battalion T2, assigned to Kampfgruppe Pfeiffer, Panzergrenadier Regiment 104, of the 21st Panzer Division, formed from Africa Draft Replacement Battalion A18

Tunis Field-Battalion T3, assigned to Panzergrenadier Regiment 160 of Division von Broich/von Manteuffel, formed from Africa Draft Replacement Battalion A20

Tunis Field-Battalion T4, assigned to Panzergrenadier Regiment 160 of Division von Broich/von Manteuffel, formed from Africa Draft Replacement Battalion A21

Tunis Field-Battalion T5 (a.k.a. Battalion Mickley), assigned to Grenadier Regiment 756, of the 334th Infantry Division, later Kampfgruppe Schmid of the Hermann Göring Division, formed from Africa Draft Replacement Battalion A23

== Battalion Commanders ==
Tunis Field Battalion T1: Rittmeister von Willich

Tunis Field Battalion T2: Oberleutnant Dieter Krüger-Haye, succeeded by Major Knösel February 1943

Tunis Field Battalion T3: Hauptmann Michael Bürgermeister, relieved of command for negligence on 5 March 1943 by Hauptmann Lerch, on the direct orders of Generalmajor Hasso von Manteuffel

Tunis Field Battalion T4: Hauptmann Karl Koch

Tunis Field Battalion T5: Hauptmann Karl Mickley

== Prominent Members of Tunis Field Battalions ==
There were several members of Tunis Field Battalions that were singled out for high awards for valor and performance of duty in adverse conditions. The list includes:

Hauptmann (Captain) Karl Koch, who was awarded the German Cross in Gold on 10 May 1943 for his service as the commander, Tunis Field-Battalion T4

Leutnant (2nd Lieutenant) Wilhelm Herr, commander of 4th Company, Tunis Field-Battalion T5, who was mentioned in dispatches and awarded the Ehrenblattspange (Honor Roll Clasp) on 8 April 1943

Stabsfeldwebel (Sergeant Major) Ewald Mrusek, who was awarded the Knight’s Cross for heroism while serving as a platoon leader in 2nd Company, Tunis Field-Battalion T1 on 24 March 1943

Hauptmann Eduard-Heinrich Kiefer, a Luftwaffe officer, who was awarded the Knight’s Cross on 18 May 1943 for his service as the commander, 4th Armored Reconnaissance Company, Tunis Field-Battalion T5, although by that time, Kiefer was in a POW camp. Incidentally, after the war Kiefer went into show business in Germany, changed his name to Til Kiwe and starred in a number of German movies and television shows.

== See also ==
- Division von Broich/von Manteuffel
- Fifth Panzer Army
- Hasso von Manteuffel
- Army Group Africa, Wehrmacht
- Panzer Army Africa, Wehrmacht
- Heer, Wehrmacht
