= Broich =

Broich may refer to:

== Places in North Rhine-Westphalia, Germany ==
(The i is not pronounced, and the o in turn is lengthened; the phenomenon is called Rheinisches Dehnungs-i; the word signifies 'swamp'.)

- Broich, a part of Dormagen
- Broich, a part of Engelskirchen in the Oberbergischer Kreis
- Broich, a part of Eschweiler in the Aachen region, location of Broich Manor
- Broich, a part of Jülich
- Broich, a part of Kürten
- Broich, a part of Mülheim an der Ruhr, location of Castle Broich
- Broich, a part of Oberkassel in the Beuel district of Bonn
- Broich, a part of Würselen in the Aachen region
- The historical county of Limburg-Broich

== People ==
- Thomas Broich, German football player
- Friedrich Freiherr von Broich, German World War II panzer commander
- Guido Peter Broich, Physician, National Health Service Expert and Director in Italy

== Other uses ==
- Division von Broich/von Manteuffel, a German World War II provisional infantry division
