= Combat! =

American television drama series (1962–1967)

- 1966–67 season color title card with top-billed Rick Jason
- Starring: Rick Jason; Vic Morrow
- Theme music composer: Leonard Rosenman
- Country of origin: United States
- No. of seasons: 5
- No. of episodes: 152 (list of episodes)

Production
- Executive producer: Selig J. Seligman
- Running time: 50 minutes per episode
- Production companies: Selmur Productions; ABC Productions; CBS Productions

Original release
- Network: ABC
- Release: October 2, 1962 – March 14, 1967

Combat! is an American television drama series that originally aired on ABC from 1962 until 1967. The exclamation point in Combat! was depicted on-screen as a stylized bayonet. The show covered the grim lives of a squad of American soldiers fighting the Germans in France during World War II. The first-season episode "A Day in June" shows D-Day as a flashback, hence the action occurs during and after June 1944. The program starred Rick Jason as platoon leader Second Lieutenant Gil Hanley and Vic Morrow as Sergeant "Chip" Saunders. Jason and Morrow would play the lead in alternating episodes in Combat!.

== Development ==
Creator Robert Pirosh's early career in film was defined mainly by comedy films. After his service in World War II, his focus changed to telling the stories of lower-rank soldiers. He won an Academy Award for his 1949 screenplay Battleground, and directed 1951's Go for Broke! Both were noted for their realistic depictions of war, accuracy and portraying soldiers grappling with human vulnerabilities and ethical dilemmas. Those factors were central to Pirosh when, in 1961, he approached producer Selig Seligman with an idea for a television series. His proposal for an hour-long drama, called Men in Combat, would follow a small squad of enlisted men from their arrival in mainland Europe on D-Day to the liberation of Paris. Seligman's Selmur Productions was intrigued, and parent network ABC ordered a pilot.

Pirosh's pilot, "A Day in June", was shot over six days in December 1961. Contemporary newspaper reports called the show Combat Platoon. One day was spent shooting on location at Trancas Beach in Malibu, which stood in for Omaha Beach.

Series leads Rick Jason and Vic Morrow were unimpressed by Pirosh's pilot, and Morrow pondered quitting the show, fearing it would damage his career. Between completion of the pilot and greenlighting a full season, Seligman and ABC made several changes, including dropping some characters and altering others. Seligman also dismissed Pirosh and brought in Robert Blees to be the series producer. Robert Altman was hired to direct, assigned to every other episode of the inaugural season.

By April 1962, ABC announced it had picked up the series, now called Combat!, for its fall primetime schedule. The network committed to a thirty-episode season, and said Combat! would be complemented by another World War II drama scheduled for Friday nights, called The Gallant Men, where Altman had directed the pilot episode.

== Production ==
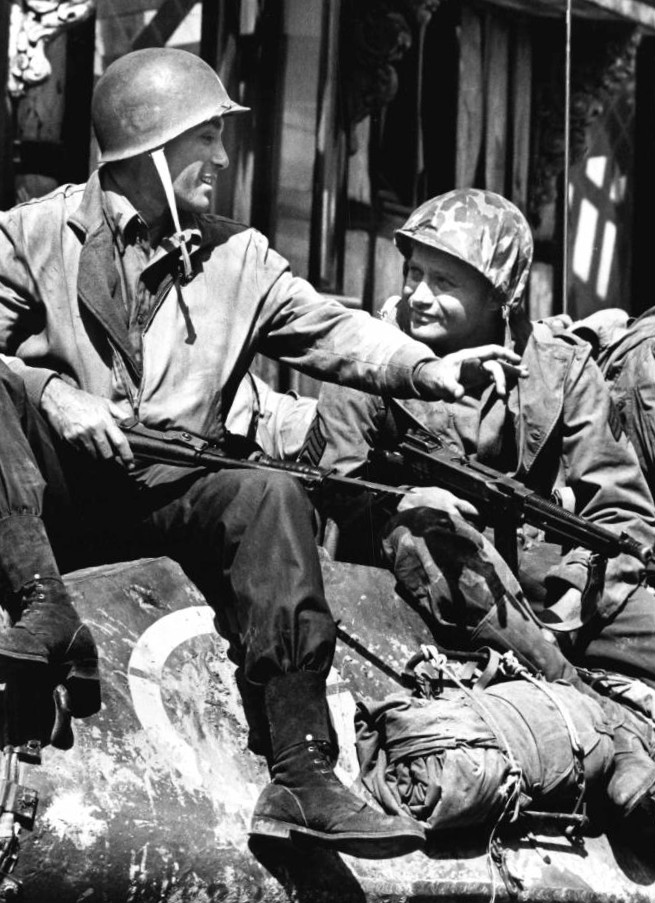
Rick Jason (left) and Vic Morrow in a first-season episode

The series went into production on June 2, 1962 and filming got underway on June 11. Episodes typically took six days to film, with a mix of soundstage shooting and heavy use of the MGM backlot for outdoor scenes. However, many scenes shot in the Hollywood Hills with parched grasses, eucalyptus trees and sandy soils were clearly unlike northern Europe, especially obvious in the color episodes. The first series opened with "Forgotten Front," telecast at 7:30 p.m. ET on Tuesday, October 2, 1962. Though it was the first to be broadcast, "Forgotten Front" was sixth in production order. The pilot, "A Day in June," would air as the eleventh episode, in December.

According to Rick Jason, "Our budgets for the first year, including pre-production, production, and post-production, (that is, the entire cost of each negative) was $127,500. In the fifth year (in color) we delivered them for $183,000. Our time schedules were six shooting days. Therefore, on a five-day week, we took a week and one day to shoot a show. Here and there, a segment went to seven shooting days and everybody in the front offices got a little nervous."

Jason said of the working conditions, "In the first year of the show, Vic and I were given dressing room suites in a building that hadn't been renovated in twenty-five years. We also had no dressing rooms on the outdoor sets (we were thankful just to have chairs). Vic went on strike the beginning of the second year and things got much better."

Wesley Britton wrote, "The producers and directors of the series (including Robert Altman, whose work on the show included 10 defining episodes) went the extra mile for establishing credibility and realism. Then and now, viewers see motion picture quality photography as in the long shots very unlike most network television of the period. They had military advisors on hand to look over scripts and maps. The cast couldn't shave during the five day shoots to help the 'beard continuity.' Except for occasional dialogue, for the most part when the 'Krauts' or 'Jerries' spoke, they did so in German. Actor Robert Winston Mercy, who wrote one script and played a number of German officers, told me the uniforms were so precisely recreated with correct pipings and insignias that he would cause a stir among Jewish cafeteria workers when he strode in wearing his costume during lunch breaks."

== Broadcast history ==
Combat! premiered on ABC on October 2, 1962, and was broadcast for five seasons to become TV's longest-running World War II drama. In total Combat! aired 152 hour-long episodes. The first 127 episodes, spanning four seasons, were produced in black and white. The fifth and final season produced 25 color episodes. The show was developed by Robert Pirosh, who wrote the pilot episode.

== Cast ==
Character	Season 1	Season 2	Season 3	Season 4	Season 5
2nd Lt. Gil Hanley	Rick Jason	Rick Jason	Rick Jason	Rick Jason	Rick Jason
Sgt. "Chip" Saunders	Vic Morrow	Vic Morrow	Vic Morrow	Vic Morrow	Vic Morrow
PFC Paul "Caje" LeMay	Pierre Jalbert	Pierre Jalbert	Pierre Jalbert	Pierre Jalbert	Pierre Jalbert
Pvt./PFC William G. Kirby	Jack Hogan	Jack Hogan	Jack Hogan	Jack Hogan	Jack Hogan
PFC "Littlejohn"	Dick Peabody	Dick Peabody	Dick Peabody	Dick Peabody	Dick Peabody
PFC "Doc" Walton	Steven Rogers				
PFC "Doc"		Conlan Carter	Conlan Carter	Conlan Carter	Conlan Carter
Pvt. Billy Nelson	Tom Lowell	Tom Lowell			
Pvt. Braddock	Shecky Greene				
Pvt. McCall					William Bryant

Recurring Characters: Season 1 only (except Davis who appeared twice in Season 2 and Captain Jampel who appeared throughout most of the show)

- Fletcher Fist as Cpl./Pvt. Brockmeyer 7 episodes
- Joby Baker as Pvt. Kelly 3 episodes (killed in third)
- John Considine as Pvt. Wayne Temple Jr. 2 episodes (killed in second)
- Arnold Meritt as Pvt. Jerome Crown 3 episodes
- Dennis Robertson as Pvt. Albert Baker 7 episodes
- William Harlow as Pvt. Davis 5 episodes
- Robert Fortier as Capt. Jampel 3 episodes

Note: Fletcher Fist, John Considine, Aronold Meritt, Dennis Robertson and William Harlow also played at least one other character from seasons 2 to 5.

Prior to portraying Pvt. McCall, William Bryant made three guest appearances throughout the first four seasons. Throughout the whole series, however, Paul Busch portrayed multiple characters, the majority of them being German. Conlan Carter (a newcomer) was nominated for a Primetime Emmy Award in 1964 for his portrayal of PFC "Doc". Carter also played an MP Cpl. in a season 1 episode prior to playing Doc.

== Guest cast ==
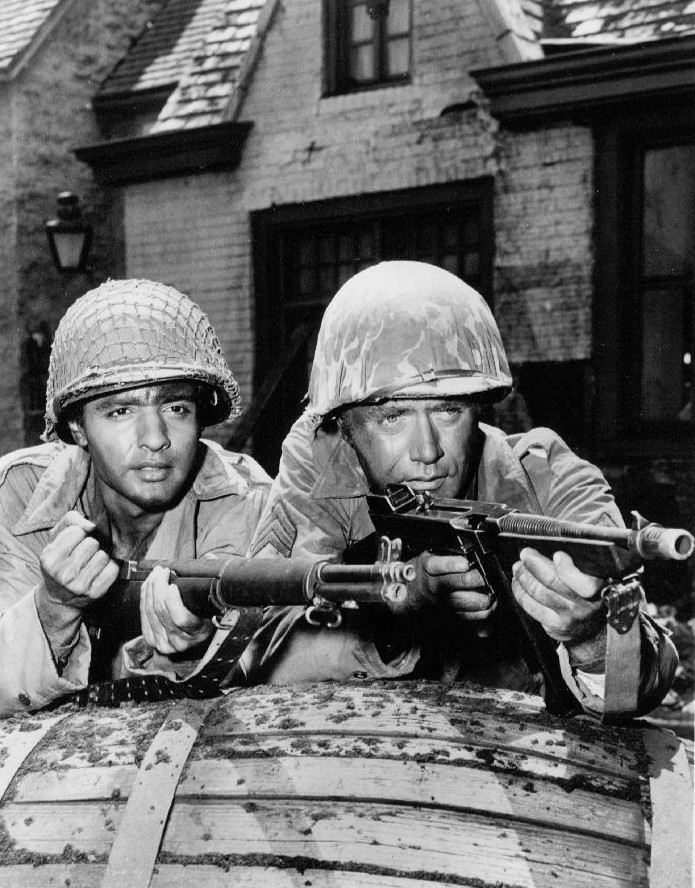
Sal Mineo and Vic Morrow in a 1965 episode

The majority of the guest stars appeared as additional squad members, French citizens or German soldiers. In the first season, the then little-known Ted Knight and Frank Gorshin made appearances. Other notable guest stars included:

- Nick Adams
- Claude Akins
- Eddie Albert
- Richard Anderson
- Frankie Avalon
- Richard Basehart
- Noah Beery Jr.
- James Best
- Bill Bixby
- Randy Boone
- Eric Braeden
- Neville Brand
- Beau Bridges
- Charles Bronson
- Paul Burke
- James Caan
- Joseph Campanella
- Jack Carter
- Terry Carter
- John Cassavetes
- James Coburn
- Anjanette Comer
- Ben Cooper
- Robert Culp
- Andrea Darvi
- John Dehner
- Brandon deWilde
- Dan Duryea
- Robert Duvall
- Chad Everett
- James Franciscus
- Peggy Ann Garner
- Emile Genest
- Joan Hackett
- Dwayne Hickman
- Dennis Hopper
- Jeffrey Hunter
- Tab Hunter
- Richard Jaeckel
- Mike Kellin
- Ted Knight
- Fernando Lamas
- Carol Lawrence
- Claudine Longet
- Jack Lord
- James MacArthur
- Lee Marvin
- Walter Maslow
- Roddy McDowall
- Sal Mineo
- Ricardo Montalbán
- Ed Nelson
- Ramón Novarro
- Leonard Nimoy
- Simon Oakland
- Warren Oates
- Margaret O'Brien
- Michael Pataki
- Andrew Prine
- Luise Rainer
- Wayne Rogers
- Gilbert Roland
- Mickey Rooney
- Bobby Rydell
- Telly Savalas
- Tom Skerritt
- William Smithers
- Warren Spahn
- Harry Dean Stanton
- Warren Stevens
- Dean Stockwell
- Frank Sutton
- Rip Torn
- Alida Valli
- Dennis Weaver
- James Whitmore
- Keenan Wynn

== Directors ==
Directors for the series were:

- Jus Addiss (1 episode)
- Robert Altman (10 episodes)
- Laslo Benedek (2 episodes)
- Richard Benedict (2 episodes)
- Michael Caffey (11 episodes)
- Alan Crosland, Jr. (6 episodes)
- Richard Donner (1 episode)
- Tom Gries (3 episodes)
- Georg J. Fenady (6 episodes)
- Herman Hoffman (1 episode)
- Burt Kennedy (6 episodes)
- Bernard McEveety (31 episodes)
- Byron Paul (1 episode)
- John Peyser (27 episodes)
- Vic Morrow (7 episodes)
- Ted Post (6 episodes)
- Sutton Roley (15 episodes)
- Boris Sagal (pilot episode)

== Military accuracy and authenticity ==
From Pirosh's original ideation of Combat!, authenticity was considered important to the show. Most of the cast members were veterans of the armed services, with several having served during World War II. Dick Peabody and Shecky Greene served in the U.S. Navy, while Rick Jason served in the Army Air Corps. Vic Morrow served in the Navy in 1947. Pierre Jalbert served in the Royal Canadian Air Cadets during World War II, Jack Hogan served as a staff sergeant in the U.S. Air Force during the Korean War, and Conlan Carter served in the U.S. Air Force during the post–Korean War era. Steven Rogers served six months in the U.S. Army. William Bryant served in the Army during World War II. Director Robert Altman served in the Army Air Corps during World War II, flying more than 50 bombing missions as a crewman on a B-24 Liberator in the South Pacific. Morrow's character often displays what appears to be a USMC cover on his helmet; it is actually a scrap from a camouflage parachute used in the D-Day invasion.

In May 1962, before filming for the series began, Seligman had the principal cast (Jason, Morrow, Rogers, Jalbert and Greene) go through a week of basic training at the Army's Infantry Training Center at Fort Ord in northern California. "We did everything from crawling under barbed wire with live .50 calibre machine bullets whizzing over our heads, to swinging across a muddy pond on a rope, to pulling the pin on a live grenade and throwing it properly, to running an obstacle course," Jason later wrote. "It was much more than I’d had to do in [World War II] for my real basic training in the Air Corps."

Morrow noted that the instructors who worked with the cast at Fort Ord had one common request: not to act like John Wayne. "Poor John," Morrow told a reporter. "I wonder if he knows he's almost a dirty word in the Army."

Seligman also asked the Army to assign a technical advisor to review and offer critique of scripts—specifically, someone who had been present at D-Day and subsequent campaigns. The Army complied, assigning Maj. Homer Jones. He served with the 82nd Airborne's 508th Parachute Infantry, parachuted into northern France on D-Day and participated in four campaigns. Jones had access to, and conferred with, Seligman, producer Robert Blees and the show's various directors and technicians to ensure the show was staged accurately. He would also arrange for the show to borrow Army equipment that could not be furnished by the studio's props department.

== Syndication ==
Combat! has been aired on and off since the 1970s in Greece, Iran, Japan, Mexico, Philippines, Brazil, Guatemala, Nicaragua, Chile, Peru, Indonesia, Colombia, Argentina, South Korea, Canada, Venezuela, Australia, Malaysia, Pakistan, and Taiwan.

As of February 2023, the Heroes & Icons channel broadcasts the series as part of its Saturday night lineup.

== Critical reception ==
The show is noted for its realism and character development.

Syndication created a new audience and interested commentators.

Pop culture scholar Gene Santoro has written,

TV's longest-running World War II drama (1962–67) was really a collection of complex 50-minute movies. Salted with battle sequences, they follow a squad's travails from D-Day on—a gritty ground-eye view of men trying to salvage their humanity and survive. Melodrama, comedy, and satire come into play as Lieutenant Hanley (Rick Jason) and Sergeant Saunders (Vic Morrow) lead their men toward Paris. Under orders, Hanley keeps sending or leading Saunders and his squad on incessant patrols though they're dead on their feet and always shorthanded; replacements are grease monkeys or cook's helpers who are fodder, and everybody knows it. The relentlessness hollows antihero Saunders out: at times, you can see the tombstones in his eyes.

Most of the first 32 episodes are very good indeed, thanks to taut scripts and canny direction... Series developer Robert Pirosh copped an Oscar for writing Battleground: his hard-edged realism is often reflected in the plots.

Later episodes inevitably get uneven, though there are gems throughout... But this TV series, shot on MGM back lots when color TVs were rare, remains exceptional.

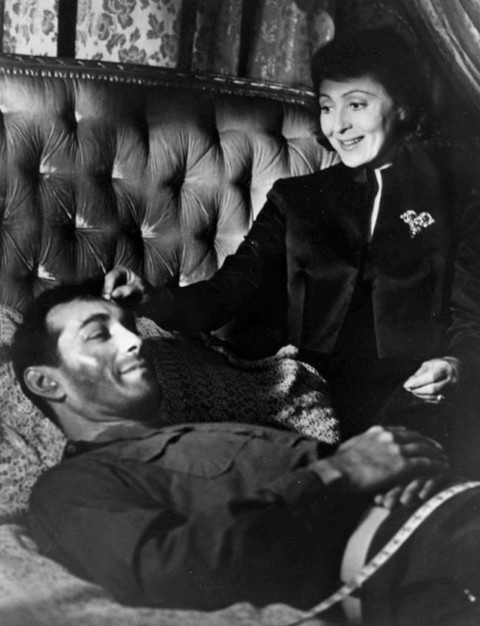
Rick Jason and Luise Rainer in 1965

Wesley Britton, son of a World War II veteran, wrote:

Unless you watched Combat! during its original 1962–1967 run, you might not know just how popular and influential the program was... In a league of its own, Combat! was aptly titled as considerable time was spent with the American soldiers engaged in machine gun fire fights and explosions while the soundtrack was filled with the martial horns and drums of the rousing Leonard Rosenman score. Combat! was also distinguished by its grim and realistic stories that frequently had only the most minimal of dialogue, and that often being only quick orders from Sgt. Saunders to his unit while they were on the move.

[...]

The 25 episodes of the fifth and final season of Combat!, the only one broadcast in color, maintained the high-quality of the show so well established in the first four years. One major change was a move from MGM studios to CBS which meant, among other matters, a new sound crew and different props. Further, in this season the color was especially memorable as most viewers were accustomed to seeing World War II in black-and-white like the newsreels of the war years. However, using color resulted in a variety of production problems such as the lack of usable stock footage. But the show wasn't simply spectacular explosion fests, although most episodes opened and closed with violent skirmishes believably orchestrated by the special effects crew."

In 1997, TV Guide ranked the episode "Survival" #74 on its list of the 100 Greatest Episodes.

== Original tie-in novels ==
Over the course of the series run, Lancer Books released three original paperback novels based on it by Harold Calin, a genre novelist who was concurrently building a catalog as one of the publisher's mainstay authors of World War II novels. The titles are Combat! (1963), Combat!: Men Not Heroes (1963) and Combat!: No Rest for Heroes (1965). The books represent their author's adaptive "take" on the TV series—a kind of "alternate storytelling universe" that was similar, if not exact—rather than strictly adhering to canonistic details and continuity. It's likely that Calin got the tie-in commission from Lancer before the series aired, and had to produce the first book to hit the stands shortly after the show debuted; thus he may have had little more to go on than some publicity material and/or a pilot script (and the series would change significantly from the pilot) and/or a show bible, and had to make best guesses without the opportunity to see an actual episode. In that pre-VCR era, even actual episodes would only have been available to him as they aired, with no way to preserve them for reference. And in that circumstance, a number of tie-in writers would likewise create similarly "approximate" novels, whose follow-ups might remain consistent to their own internal continuity.

Interestingly, an original novel that more accurately presents the series' tone and characters—whose author had clearly had time to absorb a number of aired episodes before writing—is one that was crafted for younger readers: Combat!: The Counterattack by Franklin M. Davis Jr. (1964, Whitman Publishing, pulp pages, laminated cardboard hardcover), who himself had a long and distinguished military career and thereafter became an author of war novels and thrillers.

== Other media ==
Coloring books, board and video games, and home media inspired by the show include:

- In 1963, Saalfield Publishing published a 144-page coloring book based on the television show. A second coloring book was published the following year, featuring a different cover.
- In 1963, the Ideal Toy Company released a board game whose cover featured images of Lt. Hanley and Sgt. Saunders along with the show's logo. However, the game itself had nothing to do with the series; it was a World War II strategy game for two players, each controlling six soldiers. The game had two basic benchmarks for victory: capture the opposing headquarters, or capture all of the other player’s soldiers.
- The Super Famicom game, Sgt. Saunders' Combat!, was based on the television show and released only in Japan. It allowed players to re-enact crucial World War II battles in Western Europe and North Africa. The names of fictional officers in addition to real-world officers (i.e., Karl Bülowius, Joachim Peiper, and Anthony McAuliffe) are used in order to maintain a sense of historical accuracy.
- In the 1990s, A film version of the show was attempted by Savoy Pictures, and later went into development by Todman/Simon Productions for Paramount Pictures, a script was penned by Bill Wisher, and Bruce Willis was in talks to star in the film, with Walter Hill slated to direct, but nothing came to fruition.
- Image Entertainment has released the entire series on DVD (Region 1). They released each season in two-volume sets in 2004 and 2005. However, all episodes are the time-compressed versions that were distributed by Worldvision Enterprises for syndication; each comes in at 46 to 47 minutes, instead of the original runtime, which was 50 to 51 minutes.
- On October 9, 2012, Image Entertainment released a five-DVD collection of 20 episodes called Combat! – 50th Anniversary Fan Favorites.
- On November 12, 2013, Image released Combat! – The Complete Series, a 40-disc set that features all 152 episodes of the series.

== See also ==
- Tour of Duty, a similar series set in the Vietnam War that ran from 1987 to 1990
- Episodes list
