= Steven Rogers (actor) =

American film and television actor

- Rogers in 1963
- Born: Richard Allan Rogers; April 18, 1937 (age 89); Chicago, Illinois, U.S.
- Education: University of Nevada, Las Vegas
- Occupations: Film and television actor
- Spouse: Keith Rogers (m. 1960)
- Children: 2

Richard Allan Rogers (born April 18, 1937) is an American film and television actor. He is best known for playing Doc Walton, the medic, in the American drama television series Combat!.

== Early life and career ==
Richard Allan Rogers was born in Chicago, Illinois on April 18, 1937. His parents were in the laundry business, and he was an only child. He attended and graduated from the University of Nevada, Las Vegas. After graduating, he attended Estelle Harman's drama school, and he served as a corporal in the United States Army Reserve for two weeks at Fort Ord in Northern California. He began his screen career in 1962, playing Jeff Allen in an episode of the ABC western television series Lawman.

Later in his career, from 1962 to 1963, Rogers played Doc Walton, the medic, in the ABC drama television series Combat!. In 1965, he starred as Brian in the film The Girls on the Beach, starring along with Noreen Corcoran, Martin West, Linda Marshall, Ahna Capri and Aron Kincaid. He also appeared in films such as Movie Star, American Style or; LSD, I Hate You, playing Barry James; Ski Party, playing Gene; and Wild Wild Winter, playing Benton.

Rogers retired from acting in 1968, last appearing in the film Angels from Hell, playing Dude.

== Personal life ==
According to The San Bernardino County Sun, Rogers married Keith in 1960, and they had two children.
