= Baron von Manteuffel =

Baron von Manteuffel may refer to:

- Edwin Freiherr von Manteuffel (1809–1885), Prussian general in the Franco-Prussian War
- Hasso von Manteuffel (1897–1978), German general in World War II
