= Rudolf Toussaint =

German army general (1891-1968)

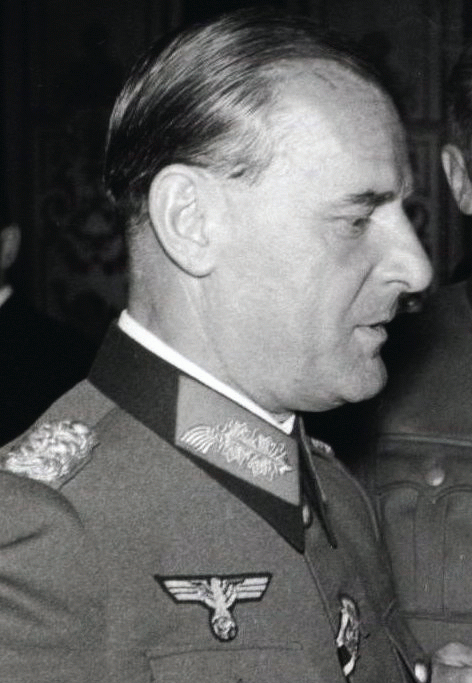
- Born: 2 May 1891; Egglkofen, Kingdom of Bavaria, German Empire
- Died: 1 July 1968 (aged 77); Munich, Bavaria, West Germany
- Relatives: ∞ 1920 Elisabeth "Lilly" Emma Morian; 1 son
- Military career
- Allegiance: Kingdom of Bavaria; German Empire; Weimar Republic; Nazi Germany
- Branch: Bavarian Army; Imperial German Army; Reichsheer; German Army
- Service years: 1911–1945
- Rank: General der Infanterie
- Conflicts: World War I World War II
- Awards: Iron Cross; War Merit Cross; German Cross

Rudolf Toussaint (2 May 1891 – 1 July 1968) was a German Army officer. Toussaint saw action in both World Wars.

== Life ==
He was born on 2 May 1891 in Egglkofen. He joined the Royal Bavarian Army on 21 September 1911 in the rank of Fahnenjunker (cadet). He was commissioned as a Leutnant (second lieutenant) on 25 October 1913 and assigned to the 18th Royal Bavarian Infantry Regiment. He fought in World War I, where he was wounded, and was awarded the Iron Cross (First Class) and the Iron Cross (2nd class) in 1914. After the war, he remained in the army and, on 1 December 1935 was promoted to Oberstleutnant; on 1 April 1938 he was promoted further to the rank of Oberst (colonel).

On 1 November 1936 appointed military and air attaché at the German Legations in Prague and Bucharest, based in Prague. From July 1939 to 31 May 1941, he served as a military attaché in the German embassy in Belgrade. On 1 July 1941, he was appointed military attaché in the German embassy in Budapest. On 1 October 1941, he was appointed Wehrmacht commander in the office of the Reich Protector of Bohemia and Moravia.

On 18 October 1943, as General der Infanterie (promoted on 1 September 1943), he was appointed Plenipotentiary General of the German Army in Italy (Bevollmächtigter General der deutschen Wehrmacht in Italien). On 26 July 1944, he was replaced in this position by SS-Obergruppenführer Karl Wolff and Toussaint became Wehrmacht commander with the office of the Reich Protector of Bohemia and Moravia, replacing Ferdinand Schaal and, simultaneously, held the position of Commander of the Military District of Bohemia and Moravia. From 20 February to 9 March 1945, he was simultaneously commandant of the Prague Defense Area. As such, he was the last German commander of Prague.

After World War II, he was captured by US troops in Plzeň and, on 19 April 1947, he was transferred into Czechoslovakia, where on 26 October 1948 he was condemned to life imprisonment for the murder of civilians in the Prague uprising.

In 1955, he agreed to collaborate with Czechoslovak State Security, but the Central Committee of the Communist Party of Czechoslovakia refused to consent to his release from prison. While still in prison, he provided them information relating to the West German military leaders and political figures. He was also a gifted painter, who has produced more than 500 oil paintings for Czech ministries and government agencies. Some are currently in Czech museums. In late 1961, as part of an exchange for two communist agents, he was released and repatriated to West Germany.

== Promotions ==
- 21 September 1911 Fahnenjunker (Officer Candidate)
- 21 January 1912 Fahnenjunker-Unteroffizier (Officer Candidate with Corporal/NCO/Junior Sergeant rank)
- 21 May 1912 Fähnrich (Officer Cadet)
- 25 October 1913 Leutnant (2nd Lieutenant)
  - 14 December 1916 received new and improved Patent from 29 October 1912
  - 26 September 1919 received new and improved Patent from 29 October 1911
- 17 January 1917 Oberleutnant (1st Lieutenant)
  - 1 July 1922 received Reichswehr Rank Seniority (RDA) from 18 April 1916 (24)
- 5 February 1923 Hauptmann (Captain) with effect from 1 February 1923 (5)
  - 1 October 1926 renamed Rittmeister
  - 1 March 1927 renamed Hauptmann
- 1 April 1933 Major (39)
- 1 December 1935 Oberstleutnant (Lieutenant Colonel) (11)
- 31 March 1938 Oberst (Colonel) with effect and RDA from 1 April 1938 (19)
- 9 October 1941 Generalmajor (Major General) with effect and RDA from 1 October 1941 (13)
- 2 October 1942 Generalleutnant (Lieutenant General) with effect and RDA from 1 October 1942 (12a)
- 8 September 1943 General der Infanterie (General of the Infantry) with effect and RDA from 1 September 1943 (2a)

== Awards and decorations ==
- Iron Cross (1914), 2nd and 1st Class
  - 2nd Class on 30 October 1915
  - 1st Class on 7 October 1918
- Bavarian Military Merit Order, 4th Class with Swords (BMV4bX/BM4X) on 16 August 1915
- Wound Badge (1918) in Black on
- DRA/German Gymnastics and Sports Badge (Deutsches Turn- und Sportabzeichen) in Bronze and Silver
  - Bronze on 1 June 1922
  - Silver in 1924
- DLRG examination certificate (Prüfungsschein) for swimmers/lifeguards of the German Life Saving Association on 30 March 1931
- Honour Cross of the World War 1914/1918 with Swords on 21 December 1934
- Order of Saint Alexander (Bulgaria), Officer's Cross
- Hungarian Cross of Merit, Officer's Cross (granted permission to accept and wear on 24 August 1935)
- Hungarian World War Commemorative Medal with Swords
- Wehrmacht Long Service Award, 4th to 1st Class on 2 October 1936
- Order of the Star of Romania, Commander's Cross on 12 August 1938
  - 4 November 1938 granted permission to accept and wear
- Sudetenland Medal with the “Prague Castle” clasp on 16 October 1939
- Hungarian Order of Merit, Commander's Cross with Star
  - Commander's Cross (intended conferral announced on 3 July 1939 by the Hungarian Legation in Berlin; granted permission to accept and wear on 29 February 1940)
  - Star (granted permission to accept and wear on 28 February 1942)
- Order of the White Eagle (Yugoslavia), Commander's Cross on 1 December 1939
  - 14 June 1940 granted permission to accept and wear
- Repetition Clasp 1939 to the Iron Cross 1914, 2nd and 1st Class in April 1941
- War Merit Cross (1939), 2nd and 1st Class with Swords on 1 September 1943
- German Cross in Silver

== Sources ==
- German Federal Archives: BArch PERS 6/371 and PERS 6/301107

Military offices
| Preceded by General der Infanterie Erich Friderici | Military commander Protectorate of Bohemia and Moravia; 1 November 1941 – 31 August 1943 | Succeeded by General der Panzertruppen Ferdinand Schaal |
| Preceded by General der Panzertruppen Ferdinand Schaal | Military commander Protectorate of Bohemia and Moravia; 26 July 1944 – 8 May 1945 | Succeeded by None |
