= Sgt. Saunders' Combat! =

- Developer: Play Avenue
- Publisher: ASCII Entertainment
- Designer: Hitokage Masuda
- Composers: Hiroo Tengenji; Yoshiaki Kubotera; Masanori Hikichi; Tomohiro Endoh
- Platform: Super Famicom
- Release: September 29, 1995
- Genre: Turn-based strategy
- Mode: Single-player (with optional CPU vs CPU mode)

Sgt. Saunders' Combat! (サージェント・サンダース・コンバット！; "Sergeant Saunders Combat!") is a turn-based strategy video game based on the 1960s television series originally broadcast on the ABC Television Network. It was released for the Super Famicom exclusively in Japan.

== Summary ==
The player can play either as Sgt. Saunders or as one of the Axis forces that fought in Europe and North Africa during World War II (Vichy France, Fascist Italy, and Nazi Germany). MIDI-quality sound faithfully captures the theme music of the original television program. In addition, the montage of the series cast added a sense of austerity and seriousness into the game itself. The graphics and animations are neither cute, super deformed, or in the anime style - depicting a "live action war" with "live action characters".

Although most of the characters in Sgt. Saunder's Combat! are fictitious, there are four commanding officers in the game that actually existed and served in World War II:

- Lesley J. McNair (U.S. Army)
- Anthony McAuliffe (U.S. Army)
- Karl Bülowius (German officer for Panzer Army Africa) - listed in game as Karl
- Joachim Peiper (German SS Officer)

== Gameplay ==
The object in the game is to defeat Adolf Hitler and Benito Mussolini so that the U.S. forces can concentrate on the Pacific Front against the Empire of Japan. The orders are in English, and are subtitled in Japanese, even though the game was never released in either North America or Europe. Using the Super Famicom mouse or the Super Famicom controller, the players gives commands to each individual unit that is under his or her control. Orders range from moving a friendly unit, attacking an enemy unit, treating a wounded person (including himself), summoning an artillery attack, exchanging weapons/items, and even fixing weapons that get jammed after repeated use.

The game has two difficulty levels; normal and expert. In the normal mode, Sgt. Saunders or his German counterpart (depending on the scenario) is strong and can fend off any blows, but in the expert mode, Sgt. Saunders can get wounded or even killed - causing the mission to immediately end with a complete failure for the player and an immediate victory for the computer opponent. After each player has completed all eight phases that consists of a single turn, both players engage all opponents that are on the same square as their unit(s) in a crisis mode. Before the next turn can begin, the player must either release the hostage, kill the hostage in hand-to-hand combat, or merely capture him as a prisoner of war. Just like in real life combat, not all actions will be successful and most will end in failure if the enemy is strong enough to resist. A percentage gauge in addition to an advisor gives players the chance of failure for each action. The closer to 100% the gauge is, the chances of success with a certain action will increase.

During the campaign mode, a player is given a squad of units to command. While other infantry units, tanks, and motorized units (including half-ton trucks produced by GMC during the 1940s) can be seen in the game, they cannot be controlled by the player. Since this game is played by Japanese school children in primary school, blood is considered to be completely absent in the game. Shooting the enemy requires the victim to go through a bureaucracy of stages - dizzy, unconscious, wounded, then finally death. Gunshots cause death slowly, while tanks and artillery can cause instant deaths; this can depend on the strength of the weapon in addition to the range between the victim and the unit that is using the weapon.

After beating the campaign mode of the game, the ending screen consists of the surviving officers along with their ranks and their accomplishments during the war.

== See also ==
- The Lone Ranger - another video game based on a vintage television program
- The Adventures of Gilligan's Island - another video game based on a classic television show
