= The Girls on the Beach =

1965 film by William Witney

- Directed by: William N. Witney
- Screenplay by: Sam Locke
- Produced by: Harvey Jacobson; Gene Corman
- Starring: Noreen Corcoran; Martin West; Linda Marshall; Steven Rogers; Ahna Capri; Aron Kincaid
- Cinematography: Arch Dalzell
- Edited by: Morton Tubor
- Music by: Gary Usher
- Production company: Levin Brothers
- Distributed by: Paramount Pictures
- Release date: May 12, 1965
- Running time: 80 minutes
- Country: United States
- Language: English
- Budget: $150,000

The Girls on the Beach is a 1965 American beach party comedy film directed by William N. Witney and written by Sam Locke. The film stars Noreen Corcoran, Martin West, Linda Marshall, Steven Rogers, Ahna Capri and Aron Kincaid. The film was released on May 12, 1965, by Paramount Pictures.

== Plot ==
Members of a sorority house engage in a variety of fund-raising schemes, including a supposed concert by The Beatles. It features musical appearances by The Beach Boys (who perform "Girls on the Beach", "Lonely Sea" and "Little Honda"), Lesley Gore (who performs "Leave Me Alone", "It's Gotta Be You" and "I Don't Want to Be a Loser"), and The Crickets.

== Cast ==
- Noreen Corcoran as Selma
- Martin West as Duke
- Linda Marshall as Cynthia
- Steven Rogers as Brian
- Ahna Capri as Arlene
- Aron Kincaid as Wayne
- Nancy Spry as Betty
- Sheila Bromley as Mrs. Winters
- Lana Wood as Bonnie
- Mary Mitchel as Emily
- Gail Gilmore as Georgia
- Peter Brooks as Stu Rankin
- Lori Saunders as Patricia Johnson
- The Crickets as themselves
- The Beach Boys as themselves
- Lesley Gore as herself

== Production ==
The film was financed by brothers Al, Sam, and Lou Levin, cinema owners from Dayton. The film's working title was Beach Girls.

Filming took place in April 1964 and lasted nine days.

== Release ==
In October 1964, Paramount Pictures acquired distribution rights to the film. On May 12, 1965, the film opened in St. Louis and Salt Lake City. On June 16, the film opened in New York City and Los Angeles.

In 1976, producer Sam Levin re-released the film as Summer of '64, which was screened at two drive-in theaters he owned. Levin wanted to "draw off the public acceptance of" the Beach Boys, then experiencing a resurgence in popularity. The retitled film was advertised with a "strong music ad campaign".

== Critical reception ==
The film reportedly grossed $2 million during its original theatrical run.

The Los Angeles Times said it had "the same old formula." Filmink commented on the plot concerning the Beatles, writing "The weird thing is, the film features appearances from The Beach Boys and Lesley Gore and you spend the whole second half going, ‘why didn’t they make this plot about trying to get The Beach Boys and/or Lesley Gore?’ The songs are great, it's hard to tell the characters apart, it's bright and colourful."

== See also ==
- List of American films of 1965
