= Wolfgang Fischer =

German general (1888–1943)

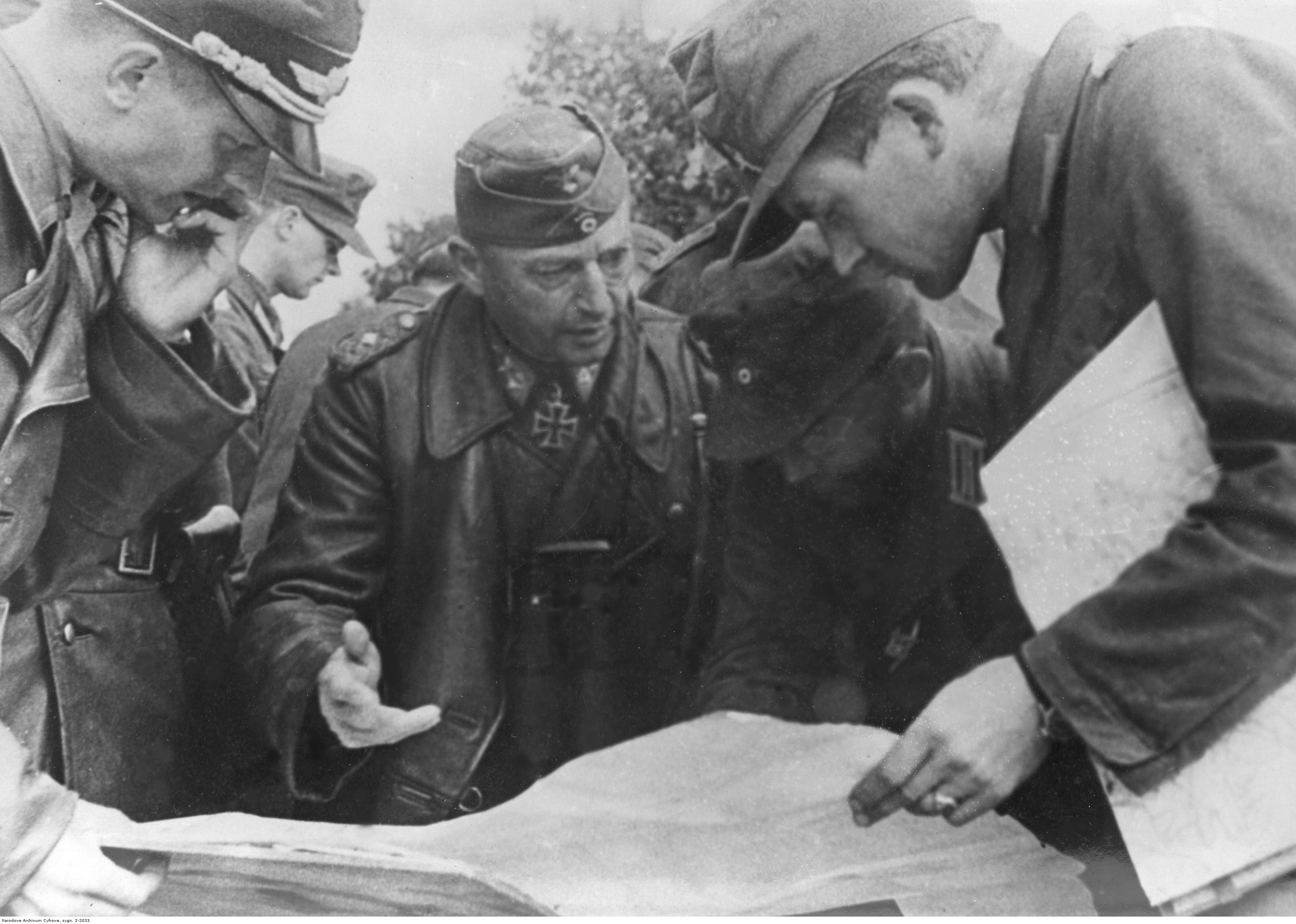
- Fischer (center) during the Tunisian campaign (January 1943)
- Born: 11 December 1888; Carolath, Silesia, German Empire
- Died: 1 February 1943 (aged 54); West of Kairouan, Tunisia
- Military career
- Allegiance: German Empire; Weimar Republic; Nazi Germany
- Branch: Imperial German Army; Reichswehr; German Army
- Service years: 1910–1943
- Rank: General der Panzertruppe (posthumous)
- Commands: 69th Infantry Regiment; 10th Rifle Brigade; 10th Panzer Division
- Conflicts: World War I; World War II; Invasion of Poland; Siege of Calais; Operation Barbarossa; Tunisia Campaign
- Awards: Knight's Cross of the Iron Cross with Oak Leaves

Wolfgang Fischer (11 December 1888 – 1 February 1943) was a German career military officer who served in the German army from 1910 until his death. As a Generalleutnant in the Wehrmacht of Nazi Germany during World War II, he was killed on 1 February 1943 west of Kairouan in Tunisia when his staff car drove into a small Italian minefield marked by barbed wire and hit a land mine. He lost his left arm and both of his legs in the blast. He bled to death while writing a farewell letter to his wife.

== Early life and World War I ==
Fischer was born in 1888 at Carolath in Silesia (today, Siedlisko in Poland). He began his military career in the Royal Prussian Army by joining the 154th (5th Lower Silesian) Infantry Regiment with the rank of Fahnenjunker on 18 March 1910. When World War I broke out, he was transferred to the 7th Landwehr Infantry Regiment as a platoon leader. He was later named adjutant of the 3rd Landwehr Division in late 1915. He held the same position with the 22nd Landwehr Infantry Brigade in the fall of 1917, serving on the western front. He remained in this post until the end of the war, attaining the rank of Hauptmann.

== Interwar years ==
Fischer joined a battalion of Freikorps volunteers during the German Revolution of 1918–1919. He was accepted into the post-war Reichswehr in 1919, and was assigned to the 3rd (Prussian) Infantry Regiment at Deutsch Eylau (now Iława, Poland) from 1920 to 1929. Between 1929 and 1934, he was a company commander in the 6th Infantry Regiment at Lübeck. He advanced to a battalion commander in the 46th Infantry Regiment from October 1934 to September 1937, when he was attached to the staff of the 69th Infantry Regiment. As an Oberst, Fischer was made commander of the regiment on 4 February 1938 during the Blomberg–Fritsch affair.

== World War II ==
Fischer commanded the 69th Infantry Regiment until October 1939, and the 10th Rifle Brigade of the 10th Panzer Division from October 1939 to August 1941. He was promoted to Generalmajor on 1 August 1941, a day before he took command of the 10th Panzer Division, and to Generalleutnant on 1 November 1942.

Fischer was killed in action during the Tunisian campaign and was posthumously promoted to the rank of General der Panzertruppe.

== Awards and decorations ==
- Iron Cross (1914) 2nd class and 1st class
- Hanseatic Cross of Hamburg
- Friedrich-August-Kreuz 2nd and 1st class
- Military Merit Cross of Austria-Hungary, 3rd class with war decoration
- Honour Cross of the World War 1914/1918
- Wehrmacht Long Service Award 4th to 1st class
- Panzer Badge
- Eastern Front Medal
- Wound Badge (1939) in gold
- Clasp to the Iron Cross 2nd class (4 September 1939) and 1st class (17 September 1939)
- German Cross in Gold (22 April 1942) as Generalmajor and commander of the 10th Panzer Division
- Knight's Cross of the Iron Cross with Oak Leaves
  - Knight's Cross (3 June 1940) as Oberst and commander of the 10th Rifle Brigade
  - Oak Leaves (9 December 1942) as Generalleutnant and commander of the 10th Panzer Division

== Popular culture ==
In the 2008 movie Valkyrie, Fischer is portrayed by Bernard Hill. The film depicts him being killed in a bombing raid by the Royal Air Force rather than by a landmine.

== Sources ==
- Patzwall, Klaus D.; Scherzer, Veit (2001). Das Deutsche Kreuz 1941 – 1945 Geschichte und Inhaber Band II [The German Cross 1941 – 1945 History and Recipients Volume 2] (in German). Norderstedt, Germany: Verlag Klaus D. Patzwall. ISBN 978-3-931533-45-8.
- Scherzer, Veit (2007). Die Ritterkreuzträger 1939–1945 Die Inhaber des Ritterkreuzes des Eisernen Kreuzes 1939 von Heer, Luftwaffe, Kriegsmarine, Waffen-SS, Volkssturm sowie mit Deutschland verbündeter Streitkräfte nach den Unterlagen des Bundesarchives [The Knight's Cross Bearers 1939–1945 The Holders of the Knight's Cross of the Iron Cross 1939 by Army, Air Force, Navy, Waffen-SS, Volkssturm and Allied Forces with Germany According to the Documents of the Federal Archives] (in German). Jena, Germany: Scherzers Militaer-Verlag. ISBN 978-3-938845-17-2.
- Thomas, Franz (1997). Die Eichenlaubträger 1939–1945 Band 1: A–K [The Oak Leaves Bearers 1939–1945 Volume 1: A–K] (in German). Osnabrück, Germany: Biblio-Verlag. ISBN 978-3-7648-2299-6.
- Webb, James Jack (2024). Generals and Admirals of the Third Reich: For Country or Fuehrer. Vol. 2: H–O. Havertown, PA: Casemate Publishers. ISBN 978-1-952-71517-4.

Military offices
Preceded by Generalleutnant Ferdinand Schaal	Commander of the 10th Panzer Division; 2 August 1941 – 1 February 1943	Succeeded by Generalmajor Friedrich Freiherr von Broich
