= Division von Broich/von Manteuffel =

Division von Broich Division von Manteuffel
- Active: 15 November 1942 – 9 May 1943
- Disbanded: 9 May 1943 (surrendered); 30 June 1943 (officially disbanded)
- Country: Nazi Germany
- Branch: Army
- Type: Light/Mixed Division
- Role: Infantry
- Size: Division - 10,000 - 12,000 men total
- Engagements: World War II: North African Campaign; Tunisia Campaign; Establishment of the Tunis Bridgehead; Defensive Battles West and South of Mateur; Battles for the Expansion of the Tunisian Bridgehead; Defense of Tunisia; Defense of Bizerte

Commanders
- Notable commanders: Friedrich Freiherr von Broich Hasso von Manteuffel Karl Bülowius

Division von Broich was a German provisional infantry division active in 1942–43 in North Africa. It was created in November 1942 and named after its notable commander Friedrich von Broich. In February 1943, the division was renamed Division von Manteuffel after its new commander, Generalmajor Hasso von Manteuffel. Despite its makeshift nature, the unit proved itself as a capable force, taking part in numerous actions until forced to capitulate with the rest of Army Group Africa in May 1943.

== Service history ==
The German action in Tunisia came in response to the Allied Landings in North Africa that took place 8 November 1942 and was intended to protect the Axis lines of communication. The unit was created on 15 November 1942 by renaming the Schützen-Brigade (Rifle Brigade) von Broich, a provisional unit formed from Ortskommandeur II/960 on 10 November. The unit was specifically designed to command and control a variety of units flown in by the Germans to defend the Bizerte and Tunis Bridgeheads in Tunisia.

Although it was never given a formal organizational structure, it was organized along the lines of a standard infantry division, but composed of a variety of German Fallschirmjäger (paratrooper) units, Tunis Field Battalions and Africa March (replacement) Battalions, as well as an Italian Bersaglieri Regiment. All of its artillery and logistics had to be improvised using a variety of German, Italian and captured Allied equipment. Though it was a makeshift force, it proved itself as a capable force, especially in the hands of its commanders, scoring German defensive victories at Mateur, Djedejda, Medjez el Bab and Sedjnane in November and December 1942.

On 7 February 1943, the division was renamed Division von Manteuffel after its new commander, Generalmajor Hasso von Manteuffel, succeeding Generalmajor von Broich, who had departed to take command of the 10th Panzer Division. As the German defensive campaign in Tunisia wore on into 1943, the division underwent several actions designed to bring its structure within the lines of a conventional infantry division, having two regiments being given formal numerical designations.

In the last battle of the campaign the Manteuffel Group was bypassed when the Allies broke through the northern front at Hill 609, and was forced to capitulate it ran out of fuel and ammunition near Bizerte on 9 May 1943.

== Assessment ==
Throughout most of its short service, it defended the northern sector of the Tunisian Front, spanning the northern coast of Tunisia as far south as the town of Pont du Fahs. One of its regiments, Fallschirmjäger Regiment Barenthin, was called "perhaps the best German troops in Africa" by none other than General Harold Alexander, Commander of the Allied 18th Army Group.

== Commanding officers ==
- Generalmajor Friedrich Freiherr von Broich 15 November 1942 – 5 February 1943
- Generalmajor Hasso von Manteuffel 7 February 1943 – 31 March 1943
- Generalleutnant Karl Bülowius 31 March - 9 May 1943

== General Staff Officers ==
- Ia - Hauptmann Prahst, Major Ulrich Boes
- Ib - Hauptmann Rudolf Beck
- Ic - Leutnant Habedank, Oberleutnant Ernst Sont
- IIa - Hauptmann Selig, Hauptmann Gustav Felix
- IIb - Leutnant Felix Monka
- 01 - Oberleutnant Ernst Sont, Leutnant Walter Schwaegermann
- O2 - Oberleutnant Karl Schleiermacher
- IVa - Stabsintendant Gerhardt Pischottka
- IVb - Oberfeldartzt Hermann Dr. Gottesbueren
- Vk - Major (Ing) Hermann Schmidt
- WuG - Oberleutnant Guenther Schreiber
- Nachr.Offz - Oberleutnant Herbert Funk

== Order of Battle (30 January 1943) ==
- Division Headquarters
- Fallschirmjäger Regiment (motorized) "Barenthin" (Luftwaffe)
- Tunis Field Battalion T3
- 4th and 12th Batteries, Artillery Regiment (motorized) 2
- 4th Battery, Artillery Regiment 190
- Panzerjäger (Antitank) Battalion 605
- Reconnaissance Company
- Fallschirmjäger Pionier Battalion (motorized) 11 (Luftwaffe)
- Panzer Communications Platoon (motorized) 190
- Bersaglieri Regiment 10 (Italian)
- Maintenance Platoon (motorized) 215
- Division Rations Office

== Order of Battle (18 March 1943) ==
- Division Headquarters
- Fallschirmjäger Regiment (motorized) "Barenthin" (Luftwaffe)
- Tunis Field Battalion T3
- Africa March Battalion A30
- 4th Battalion, Artillery Regiment (motorized) 2
- Flak Battlegroup (Luftwaffe)
- Fallschirmjäger Pionier Battalion (motorized) 11 (Luftwaffe)
- Panzer Communications Platoon (motorized) 190
- Bersaglieri Regiment 10 (Italian)
- Transportation Battalion "Weber"
- Maintenance Company (motorized) 215
- Medical Company (motorized) "Burgass"
- Division Rations Office
- Division Field Post Office

== Order of Battle (23 March 1943) ==
- Division Headquarters
- Fallschirmjäger Regiment (motorized) "Barenthin" (Luftwaffe) with:
  - I - III Battalions
- Panzergrenadier Regiment 160 (a.k.a. Kampfgruppe Ballerstedt) with:
  - Tunis Field Battalion T3
  - Tunis Field Battalion T4
  - Africa March Battalion A30
- Bersaglieri Regiment 10 (Italian) with:
  - XVI Bersaglieri Battalion
  - XXXIV Bersaglieri Battalion
  - LXIII Bersaglieri Battalion
- IV Battalion, Artillery Regiment (motorized) 2 with:
  - 10th Battery, Artillery Regiment 2
  - 11th Battery, Artillery Regiment 2
  - 12th Battery, Artillery Regiment 2
- 4th Battery, Artillery Regiment 190
- Fallschirmjäger Pionier Battalion (motorized) 11 (Luftwaffe)
- Flak Battlegroup (Luftwaffe)
- Panzer Communications Platoon (motorized) 190
- Medical Company "Burgass"
- Heavy Truck Column "Weber"
- Maintenance Platoon (motorized) 215
- Division Rations Office

== See also ==
- Division (military), Military unit, List of German divisions in World War II
- Heer, Wehrmacht
- Fifth Panzer Army
- Panzer Army Africa, Wehrmacht
- Army Group Africa, Wehrmacht
- Hasso von Manteuffel
