= Angels from Hell =

1968 film by Bruce Kessler

- Theatrical release poster
- Directed by: Bruce Kessler
- Written by: Jerome Wish
- Produced by: Kurt Neumann; Joe Solomon (executive producer)
- Starring: Tom Stern; Arlene Martel
- Cinematography: Herman Knox
- Edited by: William Martin
- Music by: Stu Phillips
- Distributed by: American International Pictures
- Release date: June 5, 1968
- Running time: 86 minutes
- Country: United States
- Language: English

Angels from Hell is a 1968 biker film directed by Bruce Kessler and starring Tom Stern and Arlene Martel. It was the first film produced by Joe Solomon's Fanfare Films, a firm Solomon had created with the profits from three previous biker films. The film was shot in Bakersfield, California. The screenplay was written by Jerome Wish, and the film used music by The Peanut Butter Conspiracy and The Lollipop Shoppe. Sonny Barger, president of the Oakland, California chapter of the Hells Angels, is credited as story consultant.

== Plot ==
A former motorcycle club leader, Mike (Tom Stern), returns home a war hero from Vietnam to resume his life, and reunite with his former motorcycle club. Finding they have left their former Riverside, California home base, Mike meets them in Bakersfield, California, now riding under the leadership of a new president, Big George. Working with his former gang, Mike takes over the club from George, and moves into their biker farmhouse, owned by Ginger (Arlene Martel). Running up against opposition from Sheriff Bingham (Jack Starrett), who had an arrangement with George to "keep the peace," Mike sets out to use all his experience as a hero from the war to unite all the existing motorcycle clubs in California to create a brand new, "super outlaw" club. Skirmishes with the sheriff's department deputies break out, and the conflicts culminate when Speed (Stephen Oliver), one of Mike's gang members, is stopped on fake possession charges, and murdered when he tries to escape. The trouble intensifies when an all-out cop-against-biker war breaks out.

== Cast ==
- Tom Stern as Mike
- Ted Markland as Smiley
- Jack Starrett as Bingham
- Arlene Martel as Ginger
- Paul Bertoya as Nutty Norman
- Jimmy Murphy as Tiny Tim
- Sandra Bettin (credited as Saundra Gayle)
- Bob Harris as Baney
- Luana Talltree as Angry Annie
- Susanne Walters as Saundra Gayle
- Rod Wilmoth as Police Officer
- Stephen Oliver as Speed
- Pepper Martin as Dennis
- Jay York as George
- Ginger Snapp as Buff
- Lori Hay as Go Go Dancer
- Lee Stanley as Reynolds
- Doug Hume as Crowley
- Jim Reynolds as Durkens
- Steven Rogers as Dude
- Susan Holloway as Jennifer
- Judith Garwood as Louise
- Tony Rush as Hippie Child
- Maureen Heard as Hippie Girl
- Barry Feinstein as The Prophet
- Dodie Warren as Hippie Girl's Mother
- Wally Berns as Hippie Girl's Father
- Cynthia McAdams as Pearl
- Bud Ekins as The Scrambler
- The Madcaps Of Bakersfield

== See also ==
- List of American films of 1968
