= Ferdinand Schaal =

German general (1889–1962)

Ferdinand Friedrich Schaal
- Born: 7 February 1889; Freiburg im Breisgau, Grand Duchy of Baden, German Empire
- Died: 9 October 1962 (aged 73); Baden-Baden, Baden-Württemberg, West Germany
- Military career
- Allegiance: German Empire; Weimar Republic; Nazi Germany
- Branch: Imperial German Army; Reichswehr; German Army
- Service years: 1908–1944
- Rank: General der Panzertruppe
- Commands: 10th Panzer Division; LVI Panzer Corps; Military commander, Protectorate of Bohemia and Moravia
- Conflicts: World War I; World War II; Invasion of Poland; Battle of Wizna; Battle of France; Siege of Calais; Operation Barbarossa
- Awards: Knight's Cross of the Iron Cross; German Cross in gold

Ferdinand Friedrich Schaal (7 February 1889 – 9 October 1962) was a German general during World War II. He commanded the 10th Panzer Division in the 1939 Invasion of Poland and directed the successful Siege of Calais in 1940. Schaal was involved in the unsuccessful 20 July plot against Adolf Hitler; for his participation in the conspiracy, he was imprisoned until the end of the war.

== Career ==
Schaal was born on 7 February 1889 in Freiburg im Breisgau, Baden. He entered the Imperial German Army in 1908. He fought in World War I and, at the end of the war, he was a Rittmeister and battalion commander in Infantry Regiment 463. He remained in the peacetime Reichswehr as a career officer. In April 1939, as part of the lead-up to the invasion of Poland, Schaal was tapped to lead the new 10th Panzer Division. He continued to command that unit through the invasions of Poland, France, and the USSR. On 16 March 1942, as the 10th Panzer Division returned to France from its bloody tour of the eastern front, Schaal was given the command of LVI Panzer Corps, which was also stationed in the Soviet Union. He served in that capacity until 1 August 1943, when he became Wehrmacht commander in the military district of Bohemia and Moravia. He remained in that post until July 1944.

== Operation Valkyrie ==
Schaal's role in Operation Valkyrie was to involve subduing the Nazi Party and establishing military control over Bohemia and Moravia. On the evening of 20 July 1944, Schaal waited for clarification on how to proceed from General Friedrich Fromm, a co-conspirator in Berlin. None came, as the assassination attempt had failed and Fromm had decided to betray the other plotters. Schaal was arrested the next day on the orders of Heinrich Himmler and imprisoned. Unlike many other conspirators, Schaal was spared execution, instead being imprisoned until the end of war.

== Awards and decorations ==
- Iron Cross (1914) 2nd and 1st class
- Knight's Cross 2nd class of the Order of the Zähringen Lion
- Hanseatic Cross of Hamburg
- Wound Badge in black
- Honour Cross of the World War 1914/1918
- Clasp to the Iron Cross, 2nd and 1st class
- German Cross in gold (8 March 1942)
- Knight's Cross of the Iron Cross on 13 July 1940 as Generalleutnant and commander of 10. Panzer-Division

Military offices
Preceded by none	Commander of 10. Panzer-Division; 1 September 1939 - 2 August 1941	Succeeded by General der Panzertruppe Wolfgang Fischer
Preceded by none	Commander of LVI Panzer Corps; 16 March 1942 - 1 August 1943	Succeeded by General der Infanterie Friedrich Hoßbach
Preceded by General der Infanterie Rudolf Toussaint	Military commander Protectorate of Bohemia and Moravia; 1 September 1943 – 26 July 1944	Succeeded by General der Infanterie Rudolf Toussaint
