= List of Combat! episodes =

This is a list of episodes of the 1962–67 ABC war drama Combat!. The series was created by American screenwriter and film director Robert Pirosh.

Note that the episodes are not in order on the DVDs. Season 1 DVDs do contain Season 1 episodes, but in random order. Use the chart below. Note: The Series is intended to be watched following the Production Number (Prod. No.) of episodes, which show the progression of events as traced in WWII history.

== Series overview ==
Season	Episodes	Originally released	
Season	Episodes	First released	Last released
1	32	October 2, 1962	May 14, 1963
2	32	September 17, 1963	April 21, 1964
3	32	September 15, 1964	April 27, 1965
4	31	September 14, 1965	April 12, 1966
5	25	September 13, 1966	March 14, 1967

== Episodes ==
=== Season 1 (1962–63) ===
The first-season DVDs come in two sets, "Campaign 1" and "Campaign 2," which are sold separately. Each "Campaign" contains four discs. Each disc contains four episodes plus bonus material. There are eight discs total in both "Campaigns," with 16 episodes in each, for a combined 32 episodes, which are listed in order below.

No. overall	No. in season	Title	Directed by	Written by	Original release date
1	1	"Forgotten Front"	Robert Altman	S : Jerome Coopersmith; T : Logan Swanson	October 2, 1962
2	2	"Rear Echelon Commandos"	Robert Altman	S : Richard Tregaskis; T : Gene Levitt	October 9, 1962
3	3	"Lost Sheep, Lost Shepherd"	Burt Kennedy	Robert Hardy Andrews	October 16, 1962
4	4	"Any Second Now"	Robert Altman	Gene Levitt	October 23, 1962
5	5	"Far From the Brave"	Burt Kennedy	Burt Kennedy	October 30, 1962
6	6	"Missing in Action"	Byron Paul	S : Bernie Lay, Jr. T : James S. Henerson & Sidney Marshall	November 13, 1962
7	7	"Escape to Nowhere"	Robert Altman	Malvin Wald	November 20, 1962
8	8	"The Celebrity"	Burt Kennedy	T : Tom Sellers; S/T : Art Wallace	November 27, 1962
9	9	"Cat and Mouse"	Robert Altman	Robert Altman	December 4, 1962
10	10	"I Swear by Apollo"	Robert Altman	Gene Levitt	December 11, 1962
11	11	"A Day in June"	Boris Sagal	Robert Pirosh	December 18, 1962
12	12	"The Prisoner"	Robert Altman	T : James S. Henerson; S/T : Robert Kaufman	December 25, 1962
13	13	"Reunion"	Paul Stanley	Art Wallace	January 1, 1963
14	14	"The Medal"	Paul Stanley	Richard Maibaum	January 8, 1963
15	15	"Just for the Record"	Laslo Benedek	William Bast	January 15, 1963
16	16	"The Volunteer"	Robert Altman	Gene Levitt	January 22, 1963
17	17	"The Squad"	Herman Hoffman	Harry Brown	January 29, 1963
18	18	"Next in Command"	Burt Kennedy	Burt Kennedy	February 5, 1963
19	19	"The Chateau"	Laslo Benedek	T : Jonathan Hughes; S/T : Judy George & George W. George	February 12, 1963
20	20	"Off Limits"	Robert Altman	George F. Slavin	February 19, 1963
21	21	"No Time for Pity"	Bernard McEveety	Steven Ritch	February 26, 1963
22	22	"Night Patrol"	Burt Kennedy	S : Quentin Sparr; T : Frank Jesse	March 5, 1963
23	23	"Survival"	Robert Altman	John D.F. Black	March 12, 1963
24	24	"No Hallelujahs for Glory"	Paul Stanley	T : Mort R. Lewis; S/T : Luther Davis	March 19, 1963
25	25	"The Quiet Warrior"	Justus Addiss	S : Luther Davis; S/T : Gene Levitt	March 26, 1963
26	26	"The Battle of the Roses"	Sutton Roley	Rik Vollaerts	April 2, 1963
27	27	"Hill 256"	James Komack	David Moessinger	April 9, 1963
28	28	"The Sniper"	Ted Post	Edward J. Lakso	April 16, 1963
29	29	"One More for the Road"	Bernard McEveety	Kay Lenard & Jess Carneol	April 23, 1963
30	30	"The Walking Wounded"	Burt Kennedy	Burt Kennedy	April 30, 1963
31	31	"High Named Today"	Paul Stanley	David Zelag Goodman	May 7, 1963
32	32	"No Trumpets, No Drums"	Richard Donner	Edward J. Lakso	May 14, 1963

=== Season 2 (1963–64) ===
The second-season DVDs come in two sets, "Mission 1" and "Mission 2," which, like the "Campaigns" of the first-season DVDs, are sold separately. Each "Mission" contains four discs. Each disc contains four episodes plus bonus material. There are eight discs total in both "Missions," with 16 episodes in each, for a combined 32 episodes, which are listed in order below.

No. overall	No. in season	Title	Directed by	Written by	Original release date
33	1	"The Bridge at Chalons"	Ted Post	Bob Mitchell & Esther Mitchell	September 17, 1963
34	2	"Bridgehead"	Bernard McEveety	Edward J. Lakso	September 24, 1963
35	3	"Masquerade"	John Peyser	Anthony Wilson	October 1, 1963
36	4	"The Long Way Home: Part 1"	Ted Post	Edward J. Lakso	October 8, 1963
37	5	"The Long Way Home: Part 2"	Ted Post	Edward J. Lakso	October 15, 1963
38	6	"The Wounded Don't Cry"	James Komack	James Landis	October 22, 1963
39	7	"Doughboy"	Tom Gries	S : Gene Levitt; T : Bernard C. Schoenfeld	October 29, 1963
40	8	"Glow Against the Sky"	Sutton Roley	Kay Lenard & Jess Carneol	November 5, 1963
41	9	"The Little Jewel"	John Peyser	Shirl Hendryx	November 12, 1963
42	10	"A Distant Drum"	John Peyser	Kay Lenard & Jess Carneol	November 19, 1963
43	11	"Anatomy of a Patrol"	Bernard McEveety	Bob Mitchell & Esther Mitchell	November 26, 1963
44	12	"Ambush"	Sutton Roley	Edward J. Lakso	December 3, 1963
45	13	"Barrage"	Sutton Roley	Edward J. Lakso	December 10, 1963
46	14	"Thunder from the Hill"	John Peyser	Edward J. Lakso	December 17, 1963
47	15	"The Party"	John Peyser	Edward J. Lakso	December 24, 1963
48	16	"Gideon's Army"	John Peyser	Charles B. Smith	December 31, 1963
49	17	"The Pillbox"	Vic Morrow	S : Ken Pettus; T : Don Tait	January 7, 1964
50	18	"The General and the Sargeant"	Bernard McEveety	Gustave Field	January 14, 1964
51	19	"The Eyes of the Hunter"	Bernard McEveety	Bob Mitchell & Esther Mitchell	January 21, 1964
52	20	"The Hostages"	Ted Post	Richard Adams	January 28, 1964
53	21	"Mail Call"	Bernard McEveety	Arnold Belgard	February 4, 1964
54	22	"Counter-Punch"	John Peyser	Kay Lenard & Jess Carneol	February 11, 1964
55	23	"A Silent Cry"	Bernard McEveety	Edward J. Lakso	February 18, 1964
56	24	"The Hunter"	Sutton Roley	Edward J. Lakso	February 25, 1964
57	25	"What Are the Bugles Blowin' For?: Part 1"	John Peyser	Edward J. Lakso	March 3, 1964
58	26	"What Are the Bugles Blowin' For?: Part 2"	John Peyser	Edward J. Lakso	March 10, 1964
59	27	"Weep No More"	Ted Post	Edward J. Lakso	March 17, 1964
60	28	"The Short Day of Private Putnam"	Bernard McEveety	Bob Mitchell & Esther Mitchell	March 24, 1964
61	29	"Rescue"	Ted Post	Edward J. Lakso	March 31, 1964
62	30	"Command"	Bernard McEveety	Kay Lenard & Jess Carneol	April 7, 1964
63	31	"The Infant of Prague"	John Peyser	Rik Vollaerts	April 14, 1964
64	32	"The Glory Among Men"	Vic Morrow	Tom Seller	April 21, 1964

=== Season 3 (1964–65) ===
The third-season DVDs come in two sets, "Operation 1" and "Operation 2," which, like the first-season "Campaigns" and the second-season "Missions," are sold separately. Each "Operation" contains four discs. Each disc contains four episodes plus bonus material. There are eight discs total in both "Operations," with 16 episodes in each, for a combined 32 episodes, which are listed in order below.

No. overall	No. in season	Title	Directed by	Written by	Original release date
65	1	"Mountain Man"	Sutton Roley	Edward J. Lakso	September 15, 1964
66	2	"Vendetta"	John Peyser	Ron Bishop & Wells Root	September 22, 1964
67	3	"Point of View"	Bernard McEveety	David Moessinger	September 29, 1964
68	4	"The Duel"	John Peyser	Edward J. Lakso	October 6, 1964
69	5	"Silver Service"	Sutton Roley	S : Edward J. Bonner; T : Kay Lenard & Jess Carneol	October 13, 1964
70	6	"The Hard Way Back"	Bernard McEveety	Edward J. Lasko	October 20, 1964
71	7	"Operation Fly Trap"	John Peyser	Don Tait	October 27, 1964
72	8	"The Little Carousel"	Bernard McEveety	Gene Levitt	November 10, 1964
73	9	"Fly Away Home"	Bernard McEveety	Kay Lenard & Jess Carneol	November 17, 1964
74	10	"The Impostor"	Sutton Roley	Kay Lenard & Jess Carneol	November 24, 1964
75	11	"A Gift of Hope"	Bernard McEveety	Anthony Wilson	December 1, 1964
76	12	"A Rare Vintage"	Sutton Roley	Bob Mitchell & Esther Mitchell	December 8, 1964
77	13	"The Long Walk"	Alan Crosland, Jr.	Peter Barry	December 15, 1964
78	14	"The Town That Went Away"	Sutton Roley	George F. Slavin	December 22, 1964
79	15	"Birthday Cake"	John Peyser	Ed Adamson	December 29, 1964
80	16	"The Enemy"	John Peyser	Steve Fisher & Edward J. Lakso	January 5, 1965
81	17	"The Cassock"	Bernard McEveety	T : Bob Mitchell & Esther Mitchell; S/T : James L. Wixted	January 12, 1965
82	18	"Losers Cry Deal"	Vic Morrow	Shirl Hendryx	January 19, 1965
83	19	"More Than a Soldier"	Bernard McEveety	Shirl Hendryx	January 26, 1965
84	20	"Brother, Brother"	Sutton Roley	Edward J. Lakso	February 2, 1965
85	21	"The Steeple"	John Peyser	Don Tait	February 9, 1965
86	22	"The Convict"	Bernard McEveety	Kay Lenard & Jess Carneol	February 16, 1965
87	23	"Dateline"	Sutton Roley	Richard L. Newhafer	February 23, 1965
88	24	"A Walk with an Eagle"	John Peyser	Rod Peterson	March 2, 1965
89	25	"The Long Wait"	John Peyser	Edward J. Lasko	March 9, 1965
90	26	"The Tree of Moray"	Bernard McEveety	T : Don Tait; S/T : Anthony Spinner	March 16, 1965
91	27	"Cry in the Ruins"	Vic Morrow	T : Edward J. Lakso; S/T : A. Martin Zweiback	March 23, 1965
92	28	"The Hell Machine"	John Peyser	Edward J. Lakso	March 30, 1965
93	29	"Billy the Kid"	Bernard McEveety	S : Bivings F. Wallace; T : Bob Mitchell & Esther Mitchell	April 6, 1965
94	30	"Heritage"	John Peyser	Barry Trivers	April 13, 1965
95	31	"Odyssey"	Alan Crosland, Jr.	Anthony Wilson	April 20, 1965
96	32	"Beneath the Ashes"	John Peyser	T : George F. Slavin; S/T : Richard P. McDonagh	April 27, 1965

=== Season 4 (1965–66) ===
The fourth-season DVDs come in two sets, "Conflict 1" and "Conflict 2," which, like the first-season "Campaigns," the second-season "Missions," and the third-season "Operations," are sold separately. Each "Conflict" contains four discs. Each disc contains four episodes, except from the last CD which contains three episodes, plus bonus material. There are eight discs total in both "Conflicts," with 16 episodes in "Conflict 1" and 15 episodes in "Conflict 2," for a combined 31 episodes, which are listed in order below.

No. overall	No. in season	Title	Directed by	Written by	Original release date
97	1	"Main Event"	Tom Gries	William Fay	September 14, 1965
98	2	"The First Day"	Georg Fenady	Bob Mitchell & Esther Mitchell	September 21, 1965
99	3	"S.I.W."	John Peyser	Shirl Hendryx	September 28, 1965
100	4	"The Linesman"	Tom Gries	S : Gene Levitt; T : Bernard C. Schoenfeld	October 5, 1965
101	5	"The Farmer"	John Peyser	Andy White	October 12, 1965
102	6	"Evasion"	John Peyser	Bob Mitchell & Esther Mitchell	October 19, 1965
103	7	"Hear No Evil"	Sutton Roley	Tim Considine & John Considine	October 26, 1965
104	8	"Crossfire"	Alan Crosland, Jr.	Edward J. Lakso	November 2, 1965
105	9	"9 Place Vendee"	Alan Crosland, Jr.	Kay Lenard & Jess Carneol	November 11, 1965
106	10	"The Old Men"	Georg Fenady	Bob Mitchell & Esther Mitchell	November 16, 1965
107	11	"Soldier of Fortune"	Sutton Roley	George F. Slavin	November 23, 1965
108	12	"The Casket"	Bernard McEveety	David Moessinger & Ed Waters	November 30, 1965
109	13	"Luck with Rainbows"	Alan Crosland, Jr.	Wells Root & Ron Bishop	December 7, 1965
110	14	"Breakout"	John Peyser	Edward J. Lakso	December 14, 1965
111	15	"Finest Hour"	Sutton Roley	Don Tait	December 21, 1965
112	16	"The Raider"	John Peyser	Kay Lenard & Jess Carneol	December 28, 1965
113	17	"The Mockingbird"	John Peyser	S : Thomas A. Conway; T : Bob Mitchell & Esther Mitchell	January 4, 1966
114	18	"The Good Samaritan"	Bernard McEveety	Shirl Hendryx	January 11, 1966
115	19	"Retribution"	Bernard McEveety	Edward J. Lakso	January 18, 1966
116	20	"Counterplay"	Alan Crosland, Jr.	Edward J. Lasko	January 25, 1966
117	21	"Nothing to Lose"	Georg Fenady	Richard Wendley	February 1, 1966
118	22	"Ask Me No Questions"	Alan Crosland, Jr.	Edward J. Lasko	February 8, 1966
119	23	"The Ringer"	Michael Caffey	S : Del Carnes; S/T : Gene L. Coon	February 15, 1966
120	24	"The Flying Machine"	Alan Crosland, Jr.	Edward J. Lasko	February 22, 1966
121	25	"Hills Are for Heroes: Part 1"	Vic Morrow	Gene L. Coon	March 1, 1966
122	26	"Hills Are for Heroes: Part 2"	Vic Morrow	Gene L. Coon	March 8, 1966
123	27	"Gitty"	Georg Fenady	Judith Barrows	March 15, 1966
124	28	"One at a Time"	Bernard McEveety	Bob Mitchell & Esther Mitchell	March 22, 1966
125	29	"A Sudden Terror"	Michael Caffey	Edward J. Lasko	March 29, 1966
126	30	"Run, Sheep, Run"	Bernard McEveety	Bob Mitchell & Esther Mitchell	April 5, 1966
127	31	"The Leader"	Georg Fenady	Bob Mitchell & Esther Mitchell	April 12, 1966

=== Season 5 (1966–67) ===
As pointed out in the main article on Combat!, this is the only season of the program produced in color.

The fifth-season DVDs come in two sets, "Invasion 1" and "Invasion 2," which, like the first-season "Campaigns," the second-season "Missions," the third-season "Operations," and the fourth-season "Conflicts," are sold separately. Each "Invasion" contains four discs. Each disc contains three episodes plus bonus material except the first disc of "Invasion 1," which contains four episodes plus bonus material. There are eight discs total in both "Invasions," with 13 episodes in "Invasion 1" and 12 episodes in "Invasion 2," for a combined 25 episodes, which are listed in order below. In September, 1967 the "spin-off" series "Garrison's Gorillas", was introduced on the "Combat!" tv series.

No. overall	No. in season	Title	Directed by	Written by	Original release date
128	1	"The Gun"	Michael Caffey	Bob Mitchell & Esther Mitchell	September 13, 1966
129	2	"The Losers"	Michael Caffey	Edward J. Lakso	September 20, 1966
130	3	"Ollie Joe"	Bernard McEveety	Frank Moss	September 27, 1966
131	4	"The Brothers"	Bernard McEveety	Irve Tunick	October 4, 1966
132	5	"The Chapel at Able-Five"	Michael Caffey	Phillip W. Hoffman	October 11, 1966
133	6	"A Child's Game"	Bernard McEveety	S : Sidney Ellis; T : Gilbert Ralston	October 18, 1966
134	7	"The Letter"	Georg Fenady	Shirl Hendryx	October 25, 1966
135	8	"Headcount"	Michael Caffey	James Menzies	November 1, 1966
136	9	"Decision"	Georg Fenady	S : Peter Barry; T : Esther Mitchell & Bob Mitchell & Paul Playdon	November 15, 1966
137	10	"The Outsider"	Richard Benedict	Shirl Hendryx	November 22, 1966
138	11	"Conflict"	Georg Fenady	Bob Mitchell & Esther Mitchell	November 29, 1966
139	12	"Gulliver"	Vic Morrow	S : Shimon Wincelberg & Richard Shapiro; T : Paul Playdon & Bob Frederick	December 6, 1966
140	13	"The Bankroll"	Georg Fenady	Shirl Hendryx	December 13, 1966
141	14	"Cry for Help"	Richard Benedict	Sheldon Stark	December 20, 1966
142	15	"The Furlough"	Bernard McEveety	Paul Playdon & Bob Frederick	December 27, 1966
143	16	"Entombed"	Bernard McEveety	S : William Bast; T : Paul Playdon & Bob Frederick	January 3, 1967
144	17	"Gadjo"	Michael Caffey	Phillip W. Hoffman	January 17, 1967
145	18	"Anniversary"	Michael Caffey	S : Edward J. Lakso; T : William R. Yates	January 24, 1967
146	19	"Encounter"	Bernard McEveety	Frank Moss	January 31, 1967
147	20	"The Gauntlet"	Michael Caffey	Paul Playdon & Bob Frederick	February 7, 1967
148	21	"The Masquers"	Georg Fenady	William R. Yates	February 14, 1967
149	22	"A Little Jazz"	Michael Caffey	James Menzies	February 21, 1967
150	23	"Nightmare on the Red Ball Run"	Michael Caffey	Dan E. Weisburd	February 28, 1967
151	24	"Jonah"	Georg Fenady	T : Richard Wendley; S/T : William Fay	March 7, 1967
152	25	"The Partisan"	Michael Caffey	Ed Waters	March 14, 1967
