= Linda Marshall =

American actress

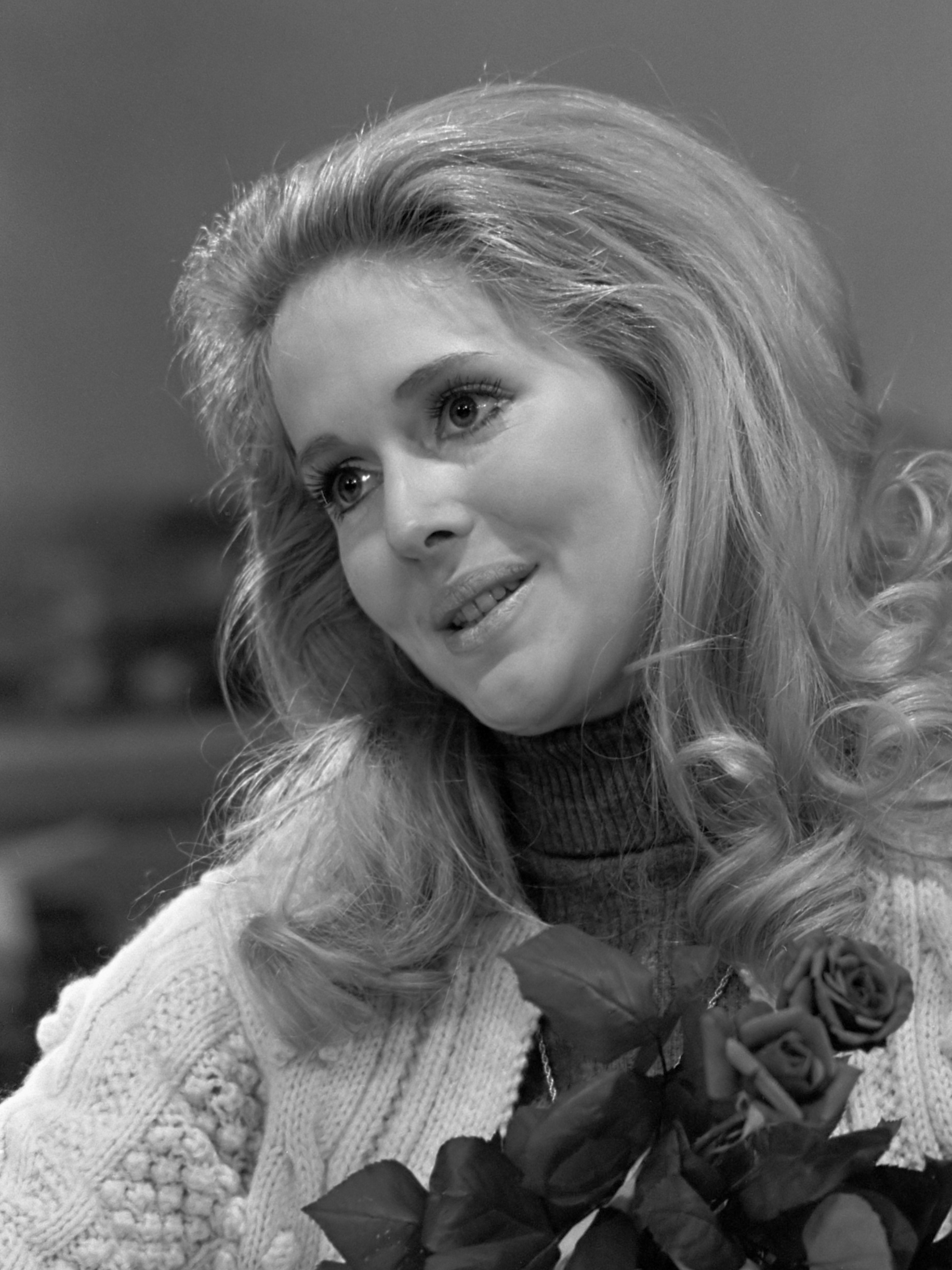
- Linda Marshall in 1970
- Born: Kansas, U.S.
- Occupation: Actress
- Years active: 1963–1977

Linda Marshall is an American actress. She started her television career in the 1963 situation comedy My Three Sons, and in 1965 appeared in her first movie, The Girls on the Beach.

Marshall was born in Kansas and attended Colorado State College in Greeley, Colorado. Her interest in acting developed at Little Theatre of the Rockies and the Oregon Shakespeare Festival.

In 1968 she attended the Palermo Conference in the Mediterranean of the Baháʼí Faith and then volunteered some time as a guide at the Baháʼí World Center. Then she traveled later in 1968 into 1969 to many locations in the US speaking about her religion. She toured in Europe for the religion in 1970 and continued to do so back in the United States in 1971, when she was also on the program of a conference on the religion in the Caribbean. In 1972 she appeared in a movie about the religion.

== TV series and film ==
- Perry Mason (1963), Young Nun / Norma Weaver
- 77 Sunset Strip (1963), Jacqueline Duncan
- My Three Sons (1963)
- Hazel (1963–1964), Linda Sterling / Secretary
- Mr. Novak (1963–1965), high-school student
- Grindl (1964), Sue Wilson
- Wendy and Me (1964)
- F Troop (1965), Lucy Landfield
- The Dick Van Dyke Show (1965), Doris
- Tammy (1965–1966), Gloria Tate (recurring role)
- Tammy and the Millionaire (Universal Pictures feature film, 1967), Gloria Tate
- The Waltons (1977), Fern Lockwood

== Movies ==
- The Girls on the Beach (1965) Cynthia
