= 5th Panzer Army =

- 5. Panzerarmee
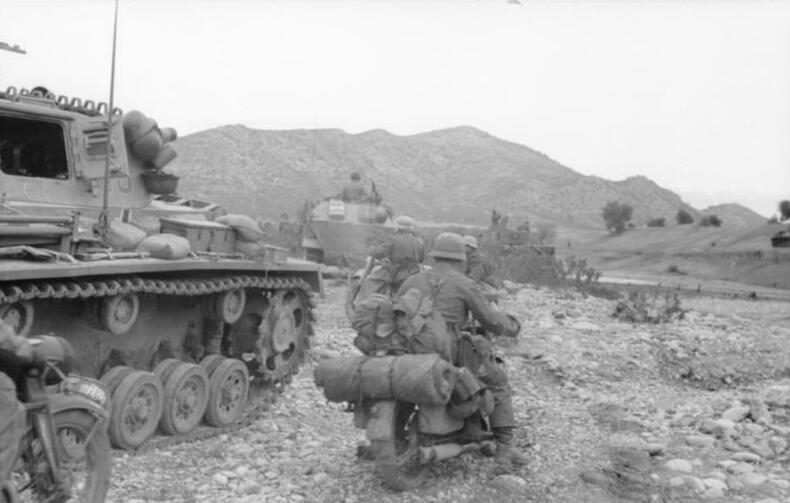
- 5th Panzer Army
- Active: 8 December 1942 – 13 May 1943; 24 January 1944 – 17 April 1945
- Country: Nazi Germany
- Branch: German Army
- Type: Panzer
- Role: Armoured warfare
- Size: Army
- Engagements: World War II; North African Campaign; Tunisian Campaign; Western Front; Operation Overlord; Battle for Caen; Falaise Pocket; Battle of the Bulge; Ruhr Pocket

Commanders
- Notable commanders: Jurgen von Arnim; Leo Geyr von Schweppenburg; Sepp Dietrich; Hasso von Manteuffel

5th Panzer Army (German: 5. Panzerarmee) was the name of two different German armoured formations during World War II. The first of these was formed in 1942, during the North African campaign and surrendered to the Allies at Tunis in 1943. The army was re-formed in France in 1944, fought in Western Europe and surrendered in the Ruhr pocket in 1945.

== History ==
=== Formation in Italy and deployment in North Africa ===
On 17 November 1942, the Stab Nehring staff, assigned to the German general in Rome, was reformed to become the LXXXX Army Corps. This staff was soon repurposed to become the 5th Panzer Army.

The 5th Panzer Army was created on 8 December 1942 as a command formation for armoured units forming to defend Tunisia against Allied attacks which threatened, after the success of the Allied Operation Torch landings in Algeria and Morocco. The army fought alongside the Italian First Army as a part of Army Group Afrika. The army capitulated on 13 May 1943, along with its commander Gustav von Vaerst.

=== Normandy ===
The army was reformed on 24 January 1944 as Panzergruppe West ("Panzer Group West"), the armoured reserve for Oberbefehlshaber West. The new army was placed under the command of Leo Geyr von Schweppenburg. The method of employment of Panzer Group West in the event of an allied invasion was the subject of much controversy, with OB West commander Gerd von Rundstedt and Army Group B commander Erwin Rommel favouring different methods. Rundstedt and Geyr believed that the panzer group should be held in reserve some distance from the front, to counter-attack Allied penetrations. Rommel was convinced that Allied air power and naval artillery would not allow the Germans the freedom to move large formations and so insisted that the panzers should be deployed much closer to the front line. Adolf Hitler forced an unhappy compromise on the western commanders and refused to allow them to commit the panzer group without his authority. When the Allied invasion of France began on 6 June 1944, Panzer Group West remained immobile; by 8 June, Geyr had been able to rush three panzer divisions northward to defend Caen against British and Canadian forces. Geyr planned to launch the divisions in a counter-attack that would drive the British and Canadians back into the sea. On 10 June, Geyr was wounded and most of his staff killed when the RAF attacked his headquarters at La Caine. Geyr's tank units managed to limit the British advance for another month but he was relieved of his command on 2 July, after seconding Rundstedt's request that Hitler authorize a strategic withdrawal from Caen. On 2 July he was replaced by Heinrich Eberbach. The panzer group fought against the Allied forces in Normandy, suffering heavy losses and eventually finding many of its divisions trapped in the Falaise Pocket. After the shattered remnants of the panzer group escaped from the pocket at the end of August, it began a retreat towards the German border.

=== Retreat, Ardennes ===
On August 1, 1944, the remaining elements of Panzer Group West were reorganized as the 5th Panzer Army, with a combat formation remaining in action under the title Panzer Group Eberbach. After a brief period under the Waffen-SS commander Sepp Dietrich, command of the army passed to Hasso von Manteuffel. The army saw heavy combat on the German border against Allied forces, the panzer divisions suffering heavily from Allied ground attack aircraft. In November the 5th Panzer Army began forming up in the Ardennes, alongside the newly formed 6th SS Panzer Army under Dietrich. Both formations took part in the Battle of the Bulge, the Fifth Panzer Army became the main central force advancing westwards from the pre-existing front lines after the planned schwerpunkt assigned to the Sixth Panzer Army was stopped at the Elsenborn Ridge and the Ambleve Valley. The Fifth Panzer Army suffered heavy losses in battles around Bastogne and in the armour battles around Celles and Dinant, the westernmost points of advance. After the offensive was cancelled, it continued its fighting withdrawal to the German border. In March, it was involved in efforts to eliminate the American bridgehead over the Rhine at the Ludendorff Bridge in Remagen. The 5th Panzer Army was encircled and trapped in the Ruhr Pocket, and surrendered on 17 April 1945.

== Commanders ==
=== Fifth Panzer Army (North Africa) ===
No.	Portrait	Commander	Took office	Left office	Time in office
–	Heinz Ziegler	Generalleutnant; Heinz Ziegler (1894–1972); Acting	3 December 1942	20 February 1943	79 days
1	Hans-Jürgen von Arnim	Generaloberst; Hans-Jürgen von Arnim (1889–1962)	20 February 1943	28 February 1943	8 days
2	Gustav von Vaerst	General der Panzertruppe; Gustav von Vaerst (1894–1975)	28 February 1943	9 May 1943	70 days

=== Panzer Group West ===
No.	Portrait	Commander	Took office	Left office	Time in office
1	Leo Geyr von Schweppenburg	General der Panzertruppe; Leo Geyr von Schweppenburg (1886–1974)	19 November 1943	2 July 1944	228 days
2	Heinrich Eberbach	General der Panzertruppe; Heinrich Eberbach (1895–1992)	4 July 1944	9 August 1944	36 days

=== Panzer Group Eberbach ===
No.	Portrait	Commander	Took office	Left office	Time in office
1	Heinrich Eberbach	General der Panzertruppe; Heinrich Eberbach (1895–1992)	10 August 1944	21 August 1944	11 days

=== Fifth Panzer Army (France) ===
No.	Portrait	Commander	Took office	Left office	Time in office
1	Heinrich Eberbach	General der Panzertruppe; Heinrich Eberbach (1895–1992)	2 July 1944	9 August 1944	38 days
2	Sepp Dietrich	SS-Oberst-Gruppenführer; Sepp Dietrich (1892–1966)	9 August 1944	9 September 1944	31 days
3	Hasso von Manteuffel	General der Panzertruppe; Hasso von Manteuffel (1897–1978)	9 September 1944	8 March 1945	180 days
4	Josef Harpe	Generaloberst; Josef Harpe (1887–1968)	8 March 1945	17 April 1945	40 days

== Order of battle (North Africa) ==
As of April 1943.

- Manteuffel Group
- 334th Infantry Division
- 999th Light Division
- Hermann Goering Division
- 10th Panzer Division
- Italian Superga Infantry Division

== Bibliography ==
- Harrison, Gordon A. (1951) [1950]. The Cross Channel Attack. United States Army in World War II: The European Theater of Operations (online ed.). Washington, DC: Off. of the Chief of Military History, Dep. of the Army. OCLC 835823314. Archived from the original on 26 February 2014.
- MacDonald, Charles B. (1973). The Last Offensive. United States Army in World War II: The European Theater of Operations (online ed.). OCLC 569757222. Archived from the original on October 31, 2011.
