= Friedrich Freiherr von Broich =

German general

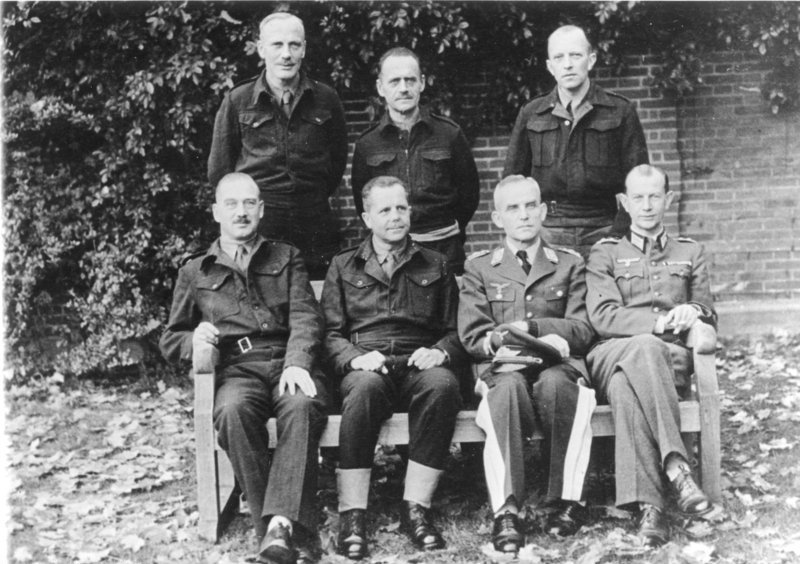
- Broich at Trent Park (seated, 1st from left)
- Born: 1 January 1896
- Died: 24 September 1974 (aged 78)
- Military career
- Allegiance: Nazi Germany
- Branch: Army
- Service years: 1914–1945
- Rank: Generalleutnant
- Commands: 10th Panzer Division
- Conflicts: World War I World War II
- Awards: Knight's Cross of the Iron Cross

Friedrich Freiherr von Broich (1 January 1896 – 24 September 1974) was a German general during World War II.

Shortly before the beginning of the Second World War, then-Major Broich was placed in command of the 34th Aufklärungsabteilung (Reconnaissance Battalion). In December 1939 Broich took over command of the 21st Cavalry Regiment, which he led during the 1940 campaign in France. After promotion to colonel on 1 September 1940, Broich became commander of the 22nd Cavalry Regiment. During the 1941 Russian campaign Broich commanded the 1st Ritter-Regiment and then on 1 December 1941 took over the 24th Rifle Brigade, which was later converted into a Panzer Grenadier brigade. In November 1942 Broich was appointed to lead the first "Broich" division in the North African theater. In February 1943 Broich was appointed commander of the 10th Panzer Division and promoted to major general.

On 12 May 1943, Broich surrendered to the British Army at Grombalia, Tunisia, along with the remnants of the 10th Panzer Division. He was detained at the Trent Park General Officer's POW Camp for the duration of the war. On 1 June 1943 he was promoted to lieutenant general. On October 7, 1947, Broich was repatriated.

== Awards ==
- German Cross in Gold on 2 November 1941 as Oberst in Regiment 22
- Knight's Cross of the Iron Cross on 29 August 1942 as Oberst and commander of the 24. Panzergrenadier-Brigade

Military offices
Preceded by none	Commander of Division von Broich; 15 November 1942 – 5 February 1943	Succeeded by Generalmajor Hasso von Manteuffel
Preceded by General der Panzertruppe Wolfgang Fischer	Commander of 10. Panzer-Division; 5 February 1943 – 12 May 1943	Succeeded by none
