= Karl Bülowius =

German army officer

Karl Robert Max Bülowius
- Bülowius, c. 1942-1943
- Born: 2 March 1890; Königsberg, Province of East Prussia, Kingdom of Prussia, German Empire
- Died: 27 March 1945 (aged 55); Camp Forrest, Coffee County, Tennessee, United States
- Military career
- Allegiance: German Empire; Weimar Republic; Nazi Germany
- Branch: Prussian Army; Reichswehr; German Army
- Service years: 1908–1920; 1924–1945
- Rank: Hauptmann; Generalleutnant
- Unit: Division von Broich/von Manteuffel (During the North African campaign - World War II)
- Commands: I Army Corps; 20th Army Engineer Battalion; 8th Army Engineering Squad; 9th Army Engineering Squad; Panzer Army Africa Engineering Squad; Post Commander of Division Von Manteuffel
- Conflicts: World War I; European theatre of World War I; Middle Eastern theatre of World War I; Sinai and Palestine Campaign; World War II; Eastern Front; Battle of Bzura/Kutno; North African Campaign; Siege of Tobruk; Second Battle of El Alamein; Battle of Sidi Bou Zid
- Awards: Iron Cross (2); German Cross

Karl Robert Max Bülowius (2 March 1890 – 27 March 1945) was a German Army officer who served during the First World War and the Second World War. He also served eleven non-consecutive years for the Weimar Republic during the interwar period which began in 1919 and ended in September 1939.

== Life and career ==
=== Early life and World War I ===
Karl Bülowius was born on 2 March 1890 in Königsberg, Germany (now Kaliningrad, Russia). He joined the Prussian Army on 26 November 1907 and became an officer cadet of the engineering troops (Fahnenjunker) where he would make his promotion to Leutnant (second lieutenant) on 19 June 1909. Bülowius participated in the First World War, serving in various engineering departments of the German Army that were involved in military duties in both Europe and Palestine. During the year 1918 (which would become the final year of the war), Bülowius was elevated to the rank of Hauptmann (captain). The First World War would end six months later on 11 November with a defeat for Germany and her allies - limiting Germany's army to 100000 men until Adolf Hitler broke the Treaty of Versailles fifteen years later. He was relieved from the Army on 31 December 1920 due to unfortunate circumstances surrounding the structure of Germany's post-World War I military.

However, Bülowius returned to active military service on 1 June 1924. He would serve in various engineering and cavalry units of the Reichswehr during the 1920s and the 1930s.

=== World War II and suicide ===
At the beginning of World War II, he commanded Oberbaustab X. Bülowius became commanding officer (Pionierführer) of engineering parts of the 8th Army on 26 October 1939. Success in commanding the 8th Army would result in Bülowius holding on the same post when he was transferred to the 9th Army on 15 May 1940. Transferred to North Africa, Bülowius commanded the engineers of Panzer Army Africa on 25 October 1942. Between 17 and 25 February 1943, he commanded the entire group. Bülowius held the position of post commander in von Manteuffel's former division in April 1943 and kept it until he was captured the following month. Von Manteuffel had been evacuated back to Germany due to exhaustion and later sent to the Eastern Front on a promotion to Major General.

He was captured by U.S. troops on 9 May 1943 near the end of the North African campaign. The North Africa campaign would end seven days later on 16 May 1943 when the Axis (mostly containing troops from Nazi Germany and Fascist Italy) forces were forced to retreat to Southern Italy in a decisive defeat. Bülowius finished his career in the German Heer component by committing suicide on 27 March 1945 at the prisoner-of-war camp named Camp Forrest in Coffee County, Tennessee, USA. He is interred at the Chattanooga National Cemetery in Chattanooga, Tennessee, USA.

=== Credentials ===
==== Promotions ====
- Fahnenjunker – 26 November 1907
- Fähnrich – 18 August 1908
- Leutnant – 19 June 1909
- Oberleutnant – 18 June 1915
- Hauptmann (Captain) – May 1918
- Major – 1 April 1934
- Oberstleutnant – 1 August 1936
- Oberst – 5 January 1939
- Generalmajor – 1 April 1942
- Generalleutnant – 1 April 1943

==== Awards ====
- Iron Cross (1914), II. and I. Class
- Türkische Silberne Liakat-(Verdienst)-Medaille mit Schwertern
- Türkischer Eiserner Halbmond
- Königlich Bulgarische Tapferkeitsorden, IV. Klasse (II. Stufe)
- Ehrenkreuz für Frontkämpfer
- Wehrmacht-Dienstauszeichnung, IV. to I. Class
- Iron Cross (1939), 2. and 1. Class
- Kriegsverdienstkreuz (1939) II. und I. Klasse mit Schwertern
- Medaille "Winterschlacht im Osten 1941/42"
- Ärmelband "Afrika"
- German Cross in Silver – November 30, 1942 as Generalmajor and Armee-Pionier-Führer der 9. Armee
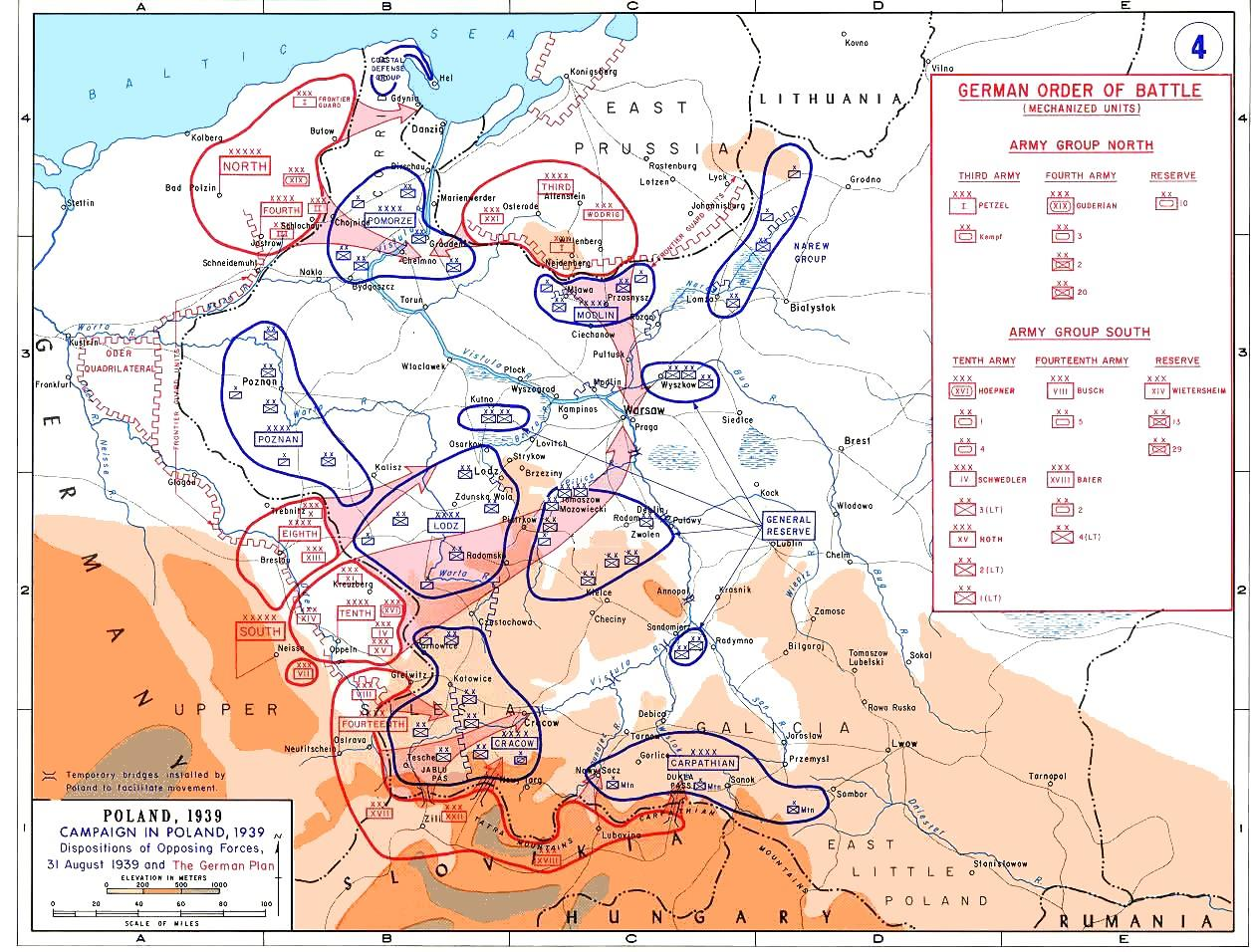
These were battle plans for the German invasion of Poland in 1939. Bülowius was considered to be a part of the 8th Army during that time.

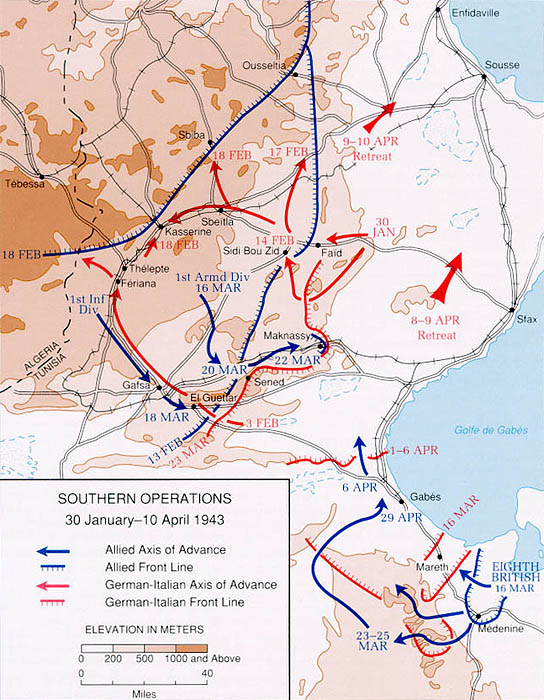
This was a strategic map from the Battle of Sidi Bou Zid; the last major battle that Bülowius participated in.

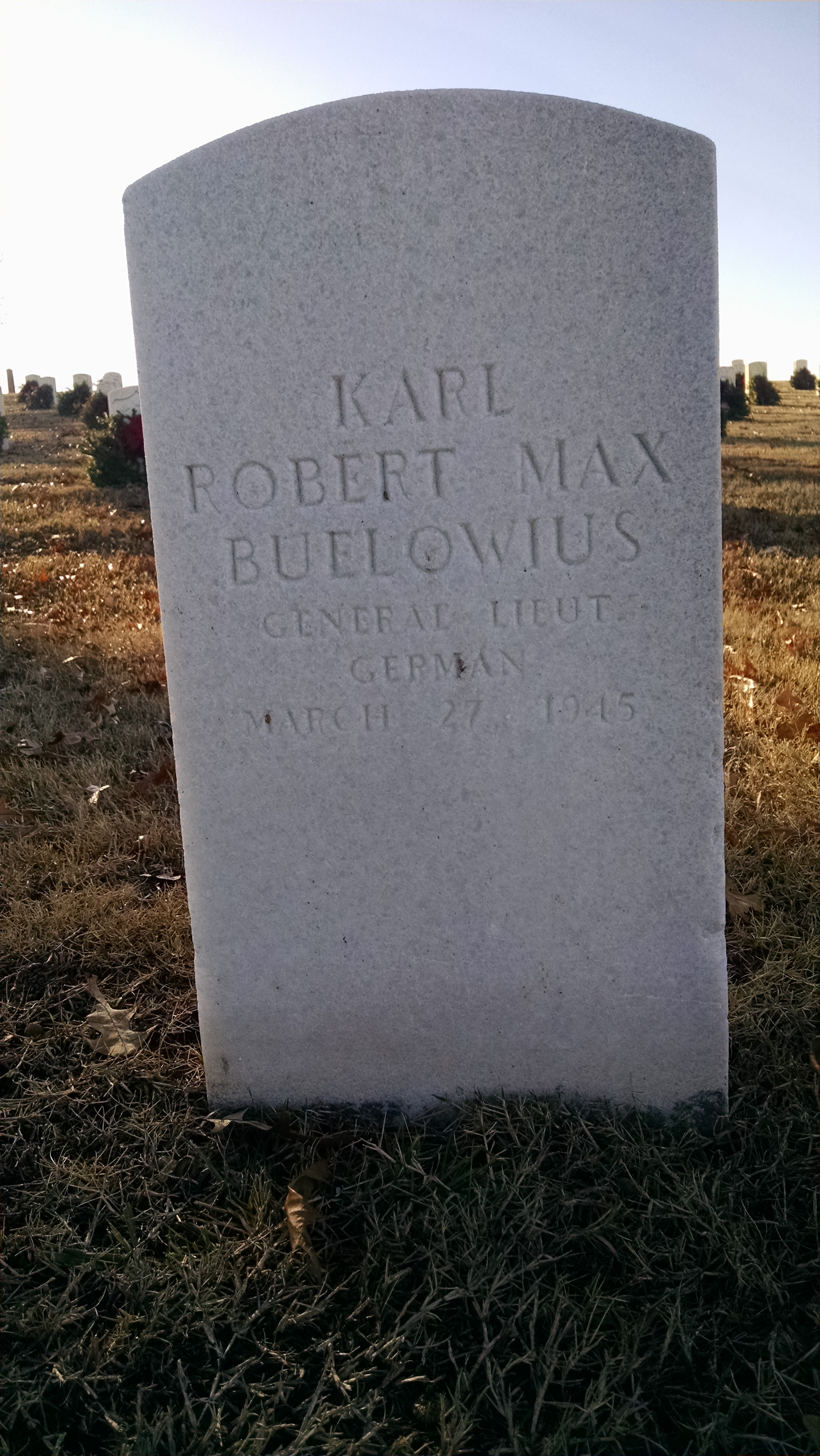
Image of the headstone of Generalleutnant Bülowius at the Chattanooga National Cemetery in Chattanooga, Tennessee, USA.

== In fiction ==
Bülowius would make a "special guest appearance" in the Japanese video game Sgt. Saunders' Combat!. This officer is only seen during the North Africa campaign of 1942–43; particularly during the Tunisia Campaign. He holds the rank of Generalmajor in the game and can be killed by any Allied Forces unit. In campaign mode, Bülowius can only be utilized by the AI opponent. He may be seen in other video games related to World War II that involve either the Eastern Front and/or the North Africa campaign.

== Citations ==
=== Book ===
- Lannoy, Francois de; Josef Charita (2001). Panzertruppen: Les Troupes Blindees Allemandes German Armored Troops 1935–45. Heimdal. ISBN 2-84048-151-0.
- Neitzel, Sönke (2005). Abgehört - Deutsche Generäle in britischer Kriegsgefangenschaft 1942-1945. Propyläen. ISBN 3-549-07261-9.

=== Web ===
Military offices
Preceded by Generalmajor Hasso von Manteuffel	Commander of Division von Manteuffel; 31 March 1943 – 30 June 1943	Succeeded by unit disbanded
