= Hasso von Manteuffel =

German general (1897–1978)

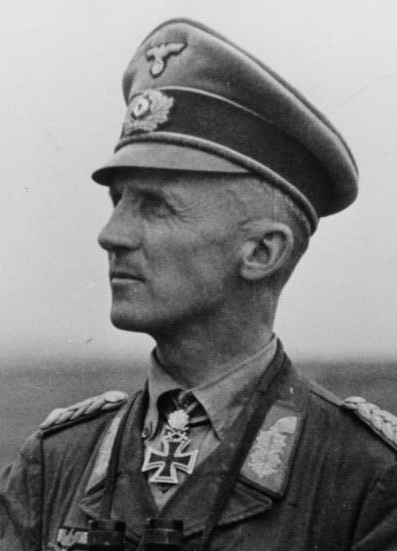
- Manteuffel in 1944
- Born: 14 January 1897; Potsdam, Kingdom of Prussia, German Empire
- Died: 24 September 1978 (aged 81); Reith, Austria
- Military career
- Allegiance: German Empire; Weimar Republic; Nazi Germany
- Branch: Imperial German Army; Reichswehr; German Army
- Service years: 1916–1945
- Rank: General der Panzertruppe
- Commands: 5th Panzer Army; Panzergrenadier Division Großdeutschland
- Conflicts: World War I; World War II; Operation Barbarossa; Battle of Tunisia; Battle of the Dnieper; Battle of the Bulge; Battle of the Seelow Heights; Battle of Berlin
- Awards: Knight's Cross of the Iron Cross with Oak Leaves, Swords and Diamonds
- Other work: Politician

Member of the Bundestag
- In office 1953–1957

Personal details
- Party: Free Democratic (1949–1956); Free People's (1956–1957); German (from 1957)

Hasso Eccard Freiherr von Manteuffel (14 January 1897 – 24 September 1978) was a German baron born to the Prussian noble von Manteuffel family and was a general during World War II who commanded the 5th Panzer Army in the Battle of the Bulge. He was a recipient of the Knight's Cross of the Iron Cross with Oak Leaves, Swords and Diamonds of Nazi Germany.

After the war, he was elected to the Bundestag (West German legislature) and was the defense-policy spokesman of the Free Democratic Party. A proponent of West German rearmament, he was responsible for coining the new name for the post-World War II West German armed forces, the Bundeswehr.

== Early career ==
Hasso von Manteuffel began his military career during the First World War. In 1919, he joined the Freikorps and then the newly created Reichswehr. In February 1937 he joined the Panzer Troop Command of the OKH, and in February 1939 became a senior professor at Panzer Troop School II in Berlin.

== World War II ==
During Operation Barbarossa, Manteuffel commanded a battalion in the 7th Panzer Division, in the Army Group Centre.

In early 1943, Manteuffel was sent to Africa, where on 5 February he became the commander of the Division von Broich/von Manteuffel, serving in 5th Panzer Army. Here Manteuffel took part in the Battle of Tunisia. Manteuffel assumed command of the 7th Panzer Division on 22 August 1943 and was posted to the Eastern Front, which had by then collapsed following the Battle of Kursk and the resulting Soviet counteroffensive. The division retreated during the resulting Battle of the Dnieper.

Manteuffel was appointed commander of the Grossdeutschland Division on 1 February 1944. The division engaged the Red Army west of Kirovograd, then retreated across Ukraine. In late July Großdeutschland was ordered to East Prussia, following the collapse of Army Group Centre in Soviet Operation Bagration. The division failed to break through to the Army Group North in the Courland Pocket.

On 1 September 1944, Manteuffel was promoted to General of Panzer Troops and given command of the 5th Panzer Army on the Western Front, which took part in the Ardennes Offensive. Manteuffel's 5th Panzer Army achieved the deepest penetration of Allied lines during the offensive, almost reaching the Meuse River, and engaging the U.S. forces at the Battle of Bastogne. On 10 March 1945 Manteuffel was made the commander of the 3rd Panzer Army on the Eastern Front, attached to Army Group Vistula. His army was assigned to defend the banks of the Oder River north of the Seelow Heights. On 25 April the Soviet 2nd Belorussian Front broke through Third Panzer Army's line, forcing a German retreat. On 3 May 1945 Manteuffel surrendered his troops to the British Army at Hagenow, Germany.

== Post-war ==
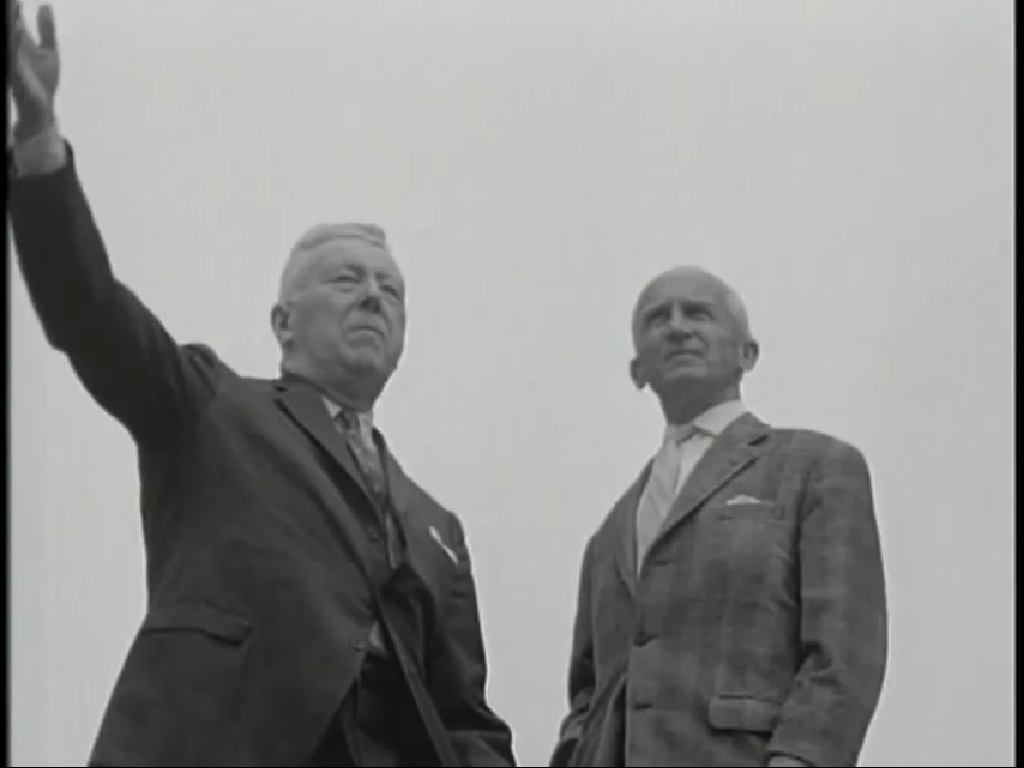
Manteuffel (right) discussing the Battle of St. Vith with US Army General Bruce C. Clarke in 1965.

At first Manteuffel was interned at the British-administered Island Farm Special Camp 11 for high-ranking Wehrmacht officers. In 1946 he was handed over to the Americans and took part in the U.S. Army Historical Division project, for which he produced a monograph on the mobile warfare aspect of the Ardennes Offensive.

Manteuffel was released in December 1946 and later became involved with politics. He joined the Free Democratic Party of Germany (FDP) in 1949 and was elected to the Bundestag in 1953. In 1956, he defected from the FDP to co-found the Free People's Party and followed the party as it merged with the German Party the following year. Manteuffel left office in 1957. In the early 1950s, he advised on the redevelopment of the Bundeswehr.

Manteuffel was charged in 1959 for having a deserter shot in 1944 (he reversed the court martial's original verdict of imprisonment and decided for a death sentence, using the Führer Order No. 7 as a basis). He was convicted and sentenced to 18 months in prison. Alaric Searle commented that Manteuffel exceeded his powers as a divisional commander, but at the same time, he agreed with Hermann Balck, who was also prosecuted for ordering the unlawful execution of a German soldier, that such a trial would be "unthinkable" for a French or British officer.

Manteuffel's purely military arguments—that signs of disintegration had appeared on other sectors of the front, that the night before the incident a case of desertion had occurred, and that his division's task, in a precarious situation, was to help protect a critical evacuation point—would probably have been accepted in most other Western countries as justifying his action.

He spoke fluent English; in 1968 he lectured at the United States Military Academy at West Point, speaking about combat in deep snow conditions and worked as a technical adviser on war films. He was interviewed in The World at War episode 3 - "France Falls (May - June 1940)" and episode 19 - "Pincers" (August 1944 – March 1945) in 1973. Manteuffel died in 1978.

== Awards ==
- Iron Cross (1914): 2nd Class (13 October 1916) & 1st Class (2 May 1917)
- Austrian Military Merit Cross (3rd Class)
- Bavarian Military Merit Cross (3rd Class)
- The Honour Cross of the World War 1914/1918
- Panzer Badge in Silver
- War Merit Cross: 2nd Class (22 July 1941) & 1st Class (1 August 1941)
- Clasp to the Iron Cross: 2nd Class & 1st Class
- Knight's Cross of the Iron Cross with Oak Leaves, Swords and Diamonds
  - Knight's Cross on 31 December 1941 as Oberst and commander of Schützen-Regiment 6
  - Oak Leaves on 23 November 1943 as Generalmajor and commander of the 7. Panzer-Division
  - Swords on 22 February 1944 as Generalleutnant and commander of the 7. Panzer-Division
  - Diamonds on 18 February 1945 as General der Panzertruppe and commander-in-chief of 5. Panzerarmee

Military offices
Preceded by Generalmajor Friedrich Freiherr von Broich	Commander of Division von Manteuffel; 7 February 1943 – 31 March 1943	Succeeded by Generalleutnant Karl Bülowius
Preceded by Oberst Wolfgang Gläsemer	Commander of 7th Panzer Division; 20 August 1943 – January 1944	Succeeded by Generalmajor Adelbert Schulz
Preceded by Generalleutnant Walter Hörnlein	Commander of Panzergrenadier-Division Großdeutschland; 27 January 1944 – 1 September 1944	Succeeded by Oberst Karl Lorenz
Preceded by SS-Oberstgruppenführer Sepp Dietrich	Commander of 5th Panzer Army; 9 September 1944 – 8 March 1945	Succeeded by Generaloberst Josef Harpe
Preceded by Generaloberst Erhard Raus	Commander of 3rd Panzer Army; 10 March 1945 – 8 May 1945	Succeeded by (none)
