= 10th Panzer Division (Wehrmacht) =

German armoured division during World War II

German 10th Panzer Division
- Unit insignia
- Active: March 1939 – 12 May 1943
- Country: Germany
- Branch: German Army; Heer
- Type: Panzer
- Role: Armoured warfare
- Size: Division
- Garrison/HQ: Wehrkreis V: Stuttgart
- Engagements: World War II; Battle of France; Siege of Calais; Operation Barbarossa; Battle of Tunisia

Insignia
- Insignia (1939–1940)

- Insignia (1940–1941)

The 10th Panzer Division (English: 10th Tank Division) was an armoured division in the German Army, the Heer, during World War II, established in March 1939.

The 10th Panzer Division was formed in Prague in March 1939, and served in the Army Group North reserve during the invasion of Poland of the same year. The division participated in the Battle of France in 1940, including the Siege of Calais, and in Operation Barbarossa attached to Army Group Center in 1941.

After taking heavy casualties on the Eastern Front it was sent back to France for rehabilitation and to serve as a strategic reserve against potential Allied invasion. The division was rushed to Tunisia after Operation Torch (1942) and spent six months in that theatre, where it engaged both British and American forces. It caused severe losses to the "green" US Army in some of their first encounters with the Germans under Field Marshal Erwin Rommel at the Battle of Kasserine Pass (1943). It was later lost in the general Axis surrender in North Africa in May 1943 and officially disbanded in June 1943. The division was never rebuilt.

In honour of notable members of the 10th Panzer Division being part of the German Resistance and the failed 20 July Plot to kill Adolf Hitler in 1944, a new armoured division was named 10th Armoured Division in 1959 upon the formation of the West German army as a part of the Bundeswehr.

== Operational history ==
For most of its history, the division was organized into three regiments: 7th Panzer, and 69th and 86th Panzergrenadier (mechanized infantry). Other units included an artillery regiment and one each of motorcycle, reconnaissance, tank destroyer, engineer, and signal battalions.

The 10th Panzer Division was first formed on 1 April 1939 in Prague, as a composite formation made-up of previously established units throughout Germany. Many of these units were transferred from the 20th Motorized Division, the 29th Motorized Division, and the 3rd Light Division. By the fall of 1939, the division was still forming, but was nonetheless committed to the invasion of Poland before the process was complete. For that reason, the 10th Panzer Division remained in reserve for most of that campaign. It was moved from Pomerania in August into Poland, where it was hastily given control of the 7th Panzer Regiment, the 4th Panzer Brigade and several SS units.

The division completed its formation by the start of 1940. It consisted of the 10th Rifle Brigade with the 69th and 86th Rifle Regiments, the 4th Panzer Brigade with the 7th and 8th Panzer Regiments, and the 90th Artillery Regiment.

Once complete, the division was sent to France to participate in the invasion of that country. Committed to the XIX Motorized Corps of Generalleutnant Heinz Guderian, the 10th Panzer Division was deployed to the southern axis of the fight, with the 1st and 2nd Panzer Divisions as well as Infantry Regiment Großdeutschland. It moved through Luxembourg and broke through the French lines at the Meuse River near Sedan, advancing all the way to the English Channel in its first engagement. At Sedan, the division remained briefly in reserve to protect the German bridgehead across the river from French counterattack. From there, the division pushed Allied forces from the ports in the Flanders region, before engaged in mopping-up operations in western areas of France after the French surrender. Following this, the division engaged in occupation duties and training in France.

In March 1941, the division was recalled to Germany, and moved to the border with the Soviet Union in June of that year in preparation for Operation Barbarossa. Once the invasion was launched, the division participated in the Battle of Białystok–Minsk, in engagements at Smolensk and Vyasma, and in the Battle of Moscow. During the Soviet winter offensive of 1941–1942, it held positions at Yukhnov, near Rzhev, against repeated Soviet counterattacks from January to April 1942. Afterwards, the depleted division was withdrawn to Amiens, France, to be reformed.

In 1942, the division was transferred to Dieppe, where it played a minor role in countering the Dieppe Raid by Allied forces. Once the Allies landed in North Africa, the 10th Panzer Division was placed on occupation duty in Vichy France, and rushed to the African Theater in late 1942 as soon as transport became available. In December 1942, the division, now a part of Fifth Panzer Army, landed in Tunisia. Here they participated in the Battle of Kasserine Pass and several of the other early battles with units of the US Army, newly committed to the war. They also took part in the failed Axis offensive of Operation Ochsenkopf in late February 1943. When the Axis line collapsed in May 1943, the division was trapped. It surrendered on 12 May and was never rebuilt.

== Organization ==
Organization of the division:

- 10th Panzer-Division (September 1939 Poland)

- 8th Tank Regiment (Panzer-Regiment 8)
- 86th Infantry Regiment (motorised) (Infanterie-Regiment 86 (mot.))
- 2nd Battalion of 29th Artillery Regiment (II./Artillerie-Regiment 29)
- 1st Battalion of 8th Reconnaissance Regiment (I./Aufklärung-Regiment 8)

- 10th Panzer Division (France 1940)

- 4th Tank Brigade (Panzer-Brigade 4)
- 7th Tank Regiment (Panzer-Regiment 7)
- 8th Tank Regiment (Panzer-Regiment 8)
- 10th Rifles Brigade (Schützen-Brigade 10)
- 69th Rifles Regiment (Schützen-Regiment 69)
- 86th Rifles Regiment (Schützen-Regiment 86)
- 706th Heavy Infantry Gun Company (led by Captain Stichtenoth of 74th Infantry Regiment)
- 90th Artillery Regiment (Artillerie-Regiment 90)
- 90th Reconnaissance Battalion (Aufklärung-Abteilung 90)
- 90th Tanks Destroyer Battalion (Panzerjäger-Abteilung 90)
- 49th Engineer Battalion (Pionier-Bataillon 49)
- 90th Signal Troop Battalion (Nachrichten-Abteilung 90)
- 90th Supply Troops (Versorgungstruppen 90)

- 10th Panzer Division (Tunisia 1943)

- 7th Tank Regiment (Panzer-Regiment 7)
- 10th Panzergrenadier Brigade (Panzergrenadier-Brigade 10)
- 69th Panzergrenadier Regiment (Panzergrenadier-Regiment 69)
- 86th Panzergrenadier Regiment (Panzergrenadier-Regiment 86)
- 90th Tank Artillery Regiment (Panzer-Artillerie-Regiment 90)
- 10th Tank Reconnaissance Battalion (Panzer-Aufklärung-Abteilung 10)
- 302nd Flak Artillery Battalion (Heeres-Flak-Artillerie-Abteilung 302)
- Anti-aircraft Group (Luftwaffen-Flak-Artillerie-Gruppe
- 90th Tank Destroyer Battalion (Panzerjäger-Abteilung 90)
- 49th Tank Engineer Battalion (Panzer-Pionier-Bataillon 49)
- 90th Tank Signal Battalion (Panzer-Nachrichten-Abteilung 90)
- 90th Tank Supply Troops (Panzer-Versorgungstruppen)

== Commanding officers ==
The division was commanded by six men during its existence, including twice when acting commanders filled Wolfgang Fischer's command.

Commander	Dates
Generalmajor Georg Gawantka	1 May 1939 – 14 July 1939
Generalleutnant Ferdinand Schaal	1 September 1939 – 2 August 1941
Generalleutnant Wolfgang Fischer	2 August 1941 – 1 February 1943
Oberst Günther Angern (Acting)	8 August 1941 – 27 August 1941
Oberst Nikolaus von Cormann (Acting)	19 November 1942 – December 1942
Generalleutnant Friedrich Freiherr von Broich	1 February 1943 – 12 May 1943

== War Crimes ==
On June 19 and 20, 1940, 188 French-Senegalese riflemen, six North African riflemen and two Russian and an Albanian legionaries were massacred by the German army from 10th Panzer and the Grossdeutschland Regiment.

== Notable members ==
Several Wehrmacht officers who had served in the 10th Panzer Division were active in the German resistance against Adolf Hitler and were imprisoned or executed after their unsuccessful attempt to assassinate him in the 20 July Plot of 1944:

- General der Panzertruppe Ferdinand Schaal, active in the resistance and imprisoned until the end of the war.
- Syndikus Albrecht von Hagen, active in the resistance and executed after the failure of the 20 July Plot.
- Oberst Claus von Stauffenberg, who placed the bomb that was intended to kill Hitler at the Wolfsschanze. He was executed and later became a symbolic figure of the German resistance in post-war Germany. The Graf-Stauffenberg-Kaserne in Sigmaringen is the HQ garrison of the newly formed post-war 10th Panzer Division of the Bundeswehr. Both were named in remembrance.
- Unteroffizier Erich Peter, who later became Generaloberst and Deputy Minister for National Defense and Chief of the Border Police Troops of the German Democratic Republic.
