= List of lieutenant generals in the United States Army before 1960 =

This is a complete list of lieutenant generals in the United States Army before 1960. The grade of lieutenant general (or three-star general) is ordinarily the second-highest in the peacetime Army, ranking above major general and below general.

Originally created for George Washington during the Quasi-War with France, the grade lapsed for most of the 19th century and early 20th century because it was considered too lofty for the diminutive peacetime establishment. Unlike the grades of major general and below, the grade of lieutenant general was not considered a functional office during this period, but the penultimate military honor, reserved for only the most eminent of wartime generals. After the Spanish–American War, the lieutenant generalcy slowly transitioned from extraordinary accolade to routine appointment, and from permanent personal grade to temporary ex officio rank. The grade was revived permanently just before World War II and has been in continuous existence ever since.

Before World War I, there was at most one lieutenant general on active duty at any time. In 1918 two field army commanders received wartime commissions as lieutenant generals to accord them rank equal to allied counterparts, the first time the grade had been conferred purely to facilitate future command instead of to reward past service. Dozens of lieutenant generals were appointed during World War II to lead the vastly expanded military establishment, and by January 1, 1960, the official Army register listed 33 lieutenant generals on active duty in the peacetime Army.

== Taxonomy ==
- A lieutenant general of the line was an officer who was commissioned in the permanent grade of lieutenant general in the Regular Army and therefore maintained that rank regardless of assignment. (When the law passed in June 1916 in the reference, only major and brigadier generals were authorized in the US Army. No lieutenant generals were appointed as lieutenant generals of the line).
- A lieutenant general of the staff was an officer who held the temporary rank of lieutenant general in the Regular Army only while occupying an office designated by statute to carry that rank, and who reverted to a lower permanent grade upon relinquishing that office.
- An emergency lieutenant general was an officer whose Regular Army grade of lieutenant general was authorized only during the World War I emergency, which expired on June 30, 1920.
- A temporary lieutenant general was an officer who was commissioned in the temporary grade of lieutenant general in the Army of the United States, typically in addition to a lower permanent grade in the Regular Army.
- A brevet lieutenant general was an officer who held the rank of lieutenant general only by brevet, and remained commissioned in the permanent grade of major general.

== List of U.S. Army lieutenant generals before 1960 ==
The following list of lieutenant generals includes all officers appointed to that rank in the United States Army prior to January 1, 1960, including brevet and temporary lieutenant generals.

Entries are indexed by the numerical order in which each officer was appointed to that rank while on active duty, or by an asterisk (*) if the officer did not serve in that rank while on active duty. Each entry lists the officer's name, date of rank, date the officer vacated the active-duty rank, number of years on active duty as lieutenant general (Yrs), positions held as lieutenant general, and other biographical notes.

	Name	Photo	Date of rank	Date vacated	Yrs	Position	Notes
1	George Washington		3 Jul 1798	14 Dec 1799	1	Commanding General, U.S. Army, 1798–1799.	(1732–1799) Promoted to General of the Armies posthumously, 4 Jul 1976. U.S. President, 1789–1797. Awarded Congressional Gold Medal, 1776.
2	Winfield Scott		29 Mar 1847	1 Nov 1861	15	Commanding General, U.S. Army, 1841–1861.	(1786–1866) Brevet rank. Awarded Congressional Gold Medal, 1814.
3	Ulysses S. Grant		2 Mar 1864	25 Jul 1866	2	Commanding General, U.S. Army, 1864–1869.	(1822–1885) Promoted to general, 25 Jul 1866. U.S. President, 1869–1877. Awarded Congressional Gold Medal, 1863.
4	William T. Sherman		25 Jul 1866	4 Mar 1869	3	Commander, Military Division of the Mississippi, 1864–1866.; Commander, Military Division of the Missouri, 1866–1869.	(1820–1891) Promoted to general, 4 Mar 1869. Superintendent, Louisiana Seminary of Learning and Military Academy, 1860–1861. Brother of U.S. Secretary of State John Sherman.
5	Philip H. Sheridan		4 Mar 1869	1 Jun 1888	19	Commander, Military Division of the Missouri, 1869–1883.; Commanding General, U.S. Army, 1883–1888.	(1831–1888) Promoted to general, 1 Jun 1888.
6	John M. Schofield		8 Feb 1895	29 Sep 1895	1	Commanding General, U.S. Army, 1888–1895.	(1831–1906) Awarded Medal of Honor, 1892. Brother of Union Army general George W. Schofield.
7	Nelson A. Miles		6 Jun 1900	8 Aug 1903	3	Commanding General, U.S. Army, 1895–1903.	(1839–1925) Candidate for Democratic Party nomination for U.S. President, 1904. Awarded Medal of Honor, 1892.
8	Samuel B. M. Young		8 Aug 1903	9 Jan 1904	0	Commanding General, U.S. Army, 1903.; Chief of Staff, U.S. Army, 1903–1904.	(1840–1924) Superintendent, Yellowstone National Park, 1907–1908. Father-in-law of Army general George W. Read; grandfather of Army general George W. Read Jr.
9	Adna R. Chaffee		9 Jan 1904	1 Feb 1906	2	Chief of Staff, U.S. Army, 1904–1906.	(1842–1914) Father of Army general Adna R. Chaffee Jr.
10	John C. Bates		1 Feb 1906	14 Apr 1906	0	Chief of Staff, U.S. Army, 1906.	(1842–1919) Son of U.S. Attorney General and Representative Edward Bates.
11	Henry C. Corbin		15 Apr 1906	15 Sep 1906	0	Commander, Northern Division, 1906.	(1842–1909)
12	Arthur MacArthur Jr.		15 Sep 1906	2 Jun 1909	3	Commander, Pacific Division, 1906–1907.; Special duty, 1907–1909.	(1845–1912) Military Governor of the Philippines, 1900–1901. Awarded Medal of Honor, 1890. Son of Wisconsin Governor Arthur MacArthur Sr.; father of Army general Douglas MacArthur; great-uncle of U.S. Ambassador Douglas MacArthur II.
13	Hunter Liggett		16 Oct 1918	30 Jun 1920	2	Commander, First Army, 1918–1919.; Commander, Third Army, 1919–1921.	(1857–1935)
14	Robert L. Bullard		16 Oct 1918	30 Jun 1920	2	Commander, Second Army, 1918–1919.; Commander, Second Corps Area, 1919–1925.	(1861–1947)
*	Edgar Jadwin		7 Aug 1929	(none)	0	(none)	(1865–1931)
15	Hugh A. Drum		5 Aug 1939	15 Oct 1943	4	Commanding General, First Army, 1938–1941.; Commanding General, First Army/Northeast Defense Command, 1941.; Commanding General, First Army/Eastern Theater of Operations, 1941–1942.; Commanding General, First Army/Eastern Defense Command, 1942–1943.; Commanding General, First Army/Eastern Defense Command/Chairman, Inter-American Defense Board, 1943.	(1879–1951) Commander, New York Guard, 1943–1948.
16	Stanley H. Ford		5 Aug 1939	30 Sep 1940	1	Commanding General, Second Army, 1938–1940.	(1877–1954)
17	Stanley D. Embick		5 Aug 1939	27 Jun 1946	6	Commanding General, Third Army, 1938–1940.; Senior War Department Member, Permanent Joint Board on Defense for Canada and the United States, 1940–1942, and Mexico and the United States, 1942.; Chairman, Inter-American Defense Board, 1942–1943 and 1943–1946.; Senior War Department Member, Joint Strategic Survey Committee, Joint Chiefs of Staff, 1942–1946.	(1877–1957)
18	Albert J. Bowley		5 Aug 1939	30 Nov 1939	0	Commanding General, Fourth Army, 1938–1939.	(1875–1945)
19	John L. DeWitt		5 Dec 1939	10 Jun 1947	8	Commanding General, Fourth Army, 1939–1941.; Commanding General, Fourth Army/Western Defense Command, 1941–1943.; Commandant, Army-Navy Staff College, 1943–1946.	(1880–1962) Promoted to general on the retired list, 19 Jul 1954.
20	Charles D. Herron		31 Jul 1940	7 Feb 1941	1	Commanding General, Hawaiian Department, 1938–1941.	(1877–1977)
21	Daniel Van Voorhis		31 Jul 1940	18 Sep 1941	1	Commanding General, Panama Canal Department, 1940–1941.; Commanding General, Panama Canal Department/Caribbean Defense Command, 1941.	(1878–1956) Son of U.S. Representative H. Clay Van Voorhis.
22	Herbert J. Brees		1 Oct 1940	15 May 1941	1	Commanding General, Third Army, 1940–1941.	(1877–1958)
23	Ben Lear		1 Oct 1940	31 Dec 1945	5	Commanding General, Second Army, 1940–1941.; Commanding General, Second Army/Central Defense Command, 1941–1943.; Member, War Department Personnel Board, 1943–1944.; Commanding General, Army Ground Forces, 1944–1945.; Deputy Commanding General, European Theater of Operations, U.S. Army, 1945.	(1879–1966) Promoted to general on the retired list, 19 Jul 1954.
24	Delos C. Emmons		25 Oct 1940	30 Jun 1948	8	Commander, General Headquarters Air Force, 1940–1941.; Commander, Air Force Combat Command, 1941.; Commanding General, Hawaiian Department, 1941–1943.; Commanding General, Western Defense Command, 1943–1944.; Commanding General, Alaskan Department, 1944–1946.; Commandant, Armed Forces Staff College, 1946–1948.	(1888–1965)
25	Walter C. Short		8 Feb 1941	16 Dec 1941	1	Commanding General, Hawaiian Department, 1941.	(1880–1949)
26	Walter Krueger		16 May 1941	5 Mar 1945	4	Commanding General, Third Army, 1941.; Commanding General, Third Army/Southern Defense Command, 1941–1943.; Commanding General, Sixth Army, 1943–1946.	(1881–1967) Promoted to general, 5 Mar 1945.
27	Lesley J. McNair		9 Jun 1941	25 Jul 1944	3	Chief of Staff, General Headquarters, U.S. Army, 1941–1942.; Commanding General, Army Ground Forces, 1942–1944.	(1883–1944) Promoted to general posthumously, 19 Jul 1954. Killed in action.
28	Douglas MacArthur		27 Jul 1941	18 Dec 1941	0	Commanding General, U.S. Army Forces in the Far East, 1941–1942.	(1880–1964) Promoted to general, 18 Dec 1941; to general of the Army, 18 Dec 1944. Awarded Medal of Honor, 1942; Congressional Gold Medal, 1962. Son of Army general Arthur MacArthur Jr.; grandson of Wisconsin Governor Arthur MacArthur Sr.; uncle of U.S. Ambassador Douglas MacArthur II.
29	Frank M. Andrews		19 Sep 1941	3 May 1943	2	Commanding General, Panama Canal Department/Caribbean Defense Command, 1941–1942.; Commanding General, U.S. Army Forces in the Middle East, 1942–1943.; Commanding General, European Theater of Operations, U.S. Army, 1943.	(1884–1943) Died in office.
30	Henry H. Arnold		15 Dec 1941	19 Mar 1943	1	Additional Chief of Staff for Air, 1941–1942.; Commanding General, Army Air Forces, 1942–1946.	(1886–1950) Promoted to general, 19 Mar 1943; to general of the Army, 21 Dec 1944; to general of the Air Force, 7 May 1949.
31	George H. Brett		7 Jan 1942	10 May 1946	4	Deputy Commander, American-British-Dutch-Australian Command/Commanding General, U.S. Army Forces in Australia, 1942.; Deputy Commander, American-British-Dutch-Australian Command, 1942.; Commanding General, U.S. Army Forces in Australia, 1942.; Commanding General, Allied Air Forces, South West Pacific Area, 1942.; Commanding General, Panama Canal Department/Caribbean Defense Command, 1942–1945.	(1886–1963)
32	William S. Knudsen		28 Jan 1942	1 Jun 1945	3	Director of Production, Office of the Under Secretary of War, 1942–1945.	(1879–1948) Resigned, 1945.
33	Joseph W. Stilwell		25 Feb 1942	1 Aug 1944	2	Commanding General, U.S. Army Forces, China Burma India Theater, 1942–1943.; Commanding General, U.S. Army Forces, China Burma India Theater/Deputy Supreme Allied Commander, South East Asia, 1943–1944.	(1883–1946) Promoted to general, 1 Aug 1944.
34	Brehon B. Somervell		9 Mar 1942	6 Mar 1945	3	Commanding General, Services of Supply, 1942–1943.; Commanding General, Army Service Forces, 1943–1946.	(1892–1955) Promoted to general, 6 Mar 1945.
35	Jonathan M. Wainwright IV		19 Mar 1942	6 Sep 1945	3	Commanding General, U.S. Forces in the Philippines, 1942.	(1883–1953) Promoted to general, 6 Sep 1945. National Commander, Disabled American Veterans, 1948–1949. Awarded Medal of Honor, 1945.
36	Joseph T. McNarney		15 Jun 1942	7 Mar 1945	3	Deputy Chief of Staff, U.S. Army, 1942–1944.; Commanding General, Mediterranean Theater of Operations, U.S. Army/Deputy Supreme Allied Commander, Mediterranean, 1944–1945.	(1893–1972) Promoted to general, 7 Mar 1945.
37	Dwight D. Eisenhower		7 Jul 1942	11 Feb 1943	1	Commanding General, European Theater of Operations, U.S. Army, 1942.; Commander in Chief, Allied Force/Commanding General, European Theater of Operations, U.S. Army, 1942–1943.; Commander in Chief, Allied Force/Commanding General, North African Theater of Operations, U.S. Army, 1943.	(1890–1969) Promoted to general, 11 Feb 1943; to general of the Army, 20 Dec 1944. President, Columbia University, 1948–1953; U.S. President, 1953–1961.
*	James G. Harbord		9 Jul 1942	(none)	0	(none)	(1866–1947) Candidate for Republican Party nomination for U.S. Vice President, 1932.
*	William M. Wright		9 Jul 1942	(none)	0	(none)	(1863–1943)
38	Jacob L. Devers		6 Sep 1942	8 Mar 1945	3	Commanding General, European Theater of Operations, U.S. Army, 1943–1944.; Commanding General, North African Theater of Operations, U.S. Army/Deputy Supreme Allied Commander, Mediterranean, 1944.; Commanding General, Sixth Army Group, 1944–1945.	(1887–1979) Promoted to general, 8 Mar 1945.
39	Robert L. Eichelberger		15 Oct 1942	31 Dec 1948	6	Commanding General, I Corps, 1942–1944.; Commanding General, Eighth Army, 1944–1948.	(1886–1961) Promoted to general on the retired list, 19 Jul 1954.
40	George C. Kenney		15 Oct 1942	9 Mar 1945	2	Commanding General, Allied Air Forces, South West Pacific Area, 1942.; Commanding General, Allied Air Forces, South West Pacific Area/Fifth Air Force, 1942–1944.; Commanding General, Far East Air Forces, 1944–1945.	(1889–1977) Promoted to general, 9 Mar 1945.
41	Mark W. Clark		11 Nov 1942	10 Mar 1945	2	Deputy Commander in Chief, Allied Force, 1942–1943.; Commanding General, Fifth Army, 1943–1944.; Commanding General, Fifteenth Army Group, 1944–1945.	(1896–1984) Promoted to general, 10 Mar 1945. President, The Citadel, 1954–1966.
42	Millard F. Harmon		2 Feb 1943	27 Feb 1946	3	Commanding General, U.S. Army Forces in the South Pacific Area, 1942–1944.; Commanding General, U.S. Army Air Forces in the Pacific Ocean Areas/Deputy Commanding General, Twentieth Air Force, 1944–1946.	(1888–1946) Died in office.
43	Courtney H. Hodges		16 Feb 1943	26 Apr 1945	2	Commanding General, Third Army/Southern Defense Command, 1943–1944.; Deputy Commanding General, First Army, 1944.; Deputy Commanding General, First Army Group/Deputy Commanding General, First Army, 1944.; Commanding General, First Army, 1944–1949.	(1887–1966) Promoted to general, 26 Apr 1945.
44	George S. Patton Jr.		12 Mar 1943	14 Apr 1945	2	Commanding General, II Corps, 1943.; Commanding General, Seventh Army, 1943.; Commanding General, First Army Group, 1944.; Commanding General, Third Army, 1944–1945.; Commanding General, Fifteenth Army, 1945.	(1885–1945) Promoted to general, 14 Apr 1945. Father-in-law of Army general John K. Waters.
45	Carl A. Spaatz		12 Mar 1943	11 Mar 1945	2	Commanding General, Twelfth Air Force, 1942–1943.; Commanding General, Fifteenth Air Force, 1943–1944.; Commanding General, U.S. Strategic Air Forces in Europe, 1944–1945.	(1891–1974) Promoted to general, 11 Mar 1945.
46	Simon B. Buckner Jr.		4 May 1943	18 Jun 1945	2	Commanding General, Alaska Defense Command, 1940–1944.; Commanding General, Tenth Army, 1944–1945.	(1886–1945) Promoted to general posthumously, 19 Jul 1954. Killed in action. Son of Kentucky Governor Simon Bolivar Buckner Sr.
47	Robert C. Richardson Jr.		1 Jun 1943	31 Oct 1946	3	Commanding General, Hawaiian Department/U.S. Army Forces in the Pacific Ocean Areas, 1943.; Commanding General, Hawaiian Department/U.S. Army Forces, Central Pacific Area, 1943–1944.; Commanding General, Hawaiian Department/U.S. Army Forces, Middle Ocean Areas, 1944–1945.; Commanding General, Hawaiian Department/U.S. Army Forces, Middle Pacific, 1945–1946.	(1882–1954) Promoted to general posthumously, 19 Jul 1954.
48	Lloyd R. Fredendall		1 Jun 1943	31 Mar 1946	3	Commanding General, Second Army/Central Defense Command, 1943–1945.	(1883–1963)
49	Omar N. Bradley		2 Jun 1943	12 Mar 1945	2	Commanding General, II Corps, 1943–1944.; Commanding General, First Army, 1944.; Commanding General, First Army Group/Commanding General, First Army, 1944.; Commanding General, Twelfth Army Group/Commanding General, First Army, 1944.; Commanding General, Twelfth Army Group, 1944–1945.	(1893–1981) Promoted to general, 12 Mar 1945; to general of the Army, 22 Sep 1950. Awarded Presidential Medal of Freedom, 1977.
50	Barton K. Yount		13 Sep 1943	30 Jun 1946	3	Commanding General, Army Air Forces Training Command, 1943–1946.	(1884–1949) President, American Institute for Foreign Trade, 1946–1949.
51	Ira C. Eaker		13 Sep 1943	30 Aug 1947	4	Commanding General, Eighth Air Force, 1942–1943.; Commander in Chief, Mediterranean Allied Air Forces, 1943–1945.; Deputy Commanding General, Army Air Forces/Chief, Air Staff, 1945–1947.	(1896–1987) Promoted to general on the retired list, 26 Apr 1985. Awarded Congressional Gold Medal, 1978.
52	George Grunert		8 Oct 1943	31 Jul 1945	2	Commanding General, First Army/Eastern Defense Command, 1943–1944.; Commanding General, Eastern Defense Command/Second Service Command, 1944–1945.	(1881–1971) Father-in-law of Army general Jonathan O. Seaman.
53	William H. Simpson		13 Oct 1943	30 Nov 1946	3	Commanding General, Fourth Army, 1943–1944.; Commanding General, Eighth Army, 1944.; Commanding General, Ninth Army, 1944–1945.; Commanding General, Second Army, 1945–1946.	(1888–1980) Promoted to general on the retired list, 19 Jul 1954.
54	Walter Bedell Smith		13 Jan 1944	1 Jul 1951	7	Chief of Staff, Allied Forces Headquarters, 1942–1944.; Chief of Staff, Supreme Headquarters Allied Expeditionary Force, 1944–1945.; Chief of Staff, U.S. Forces, European Theater, 1945.; Commanding General, First Army, 1949–1950.; Director of Central Intelligence, 1950–1953.	(1895–1961) Promoted to general, 1 Jul 1951. U.S. Ambassador to the Soviet Union, 1946–1949; U.S. Under Secretary of State, 1953–1954.
55	Richard K. Sutherland		20 Feb 1944	30 Nov 1946	3	Chief of Staff, South West Pacific Area, 1942–1945.	(1893–1966) Son of U.S. Senator Howard Sutherland.
56	John C. H. Lee		21 Feb 1944	31 Dec 1947	4	Commanding General, Services of Supply, European Theater of Operations, U.S. Army/Deputy Commanding General, European Theater of Operations, U.S. Army, 1944.; Commanding General, Communications Zone, European Theater of Operations, U.S. Army/Deputy Commanding General, European Theater of Operations, U.S. Army, 1944.; Commanding General, Communications Zone, European Theater of Operations, U.S. Army, 1944–1945.; Commanding General, Theater Service Forces, European Theater of Operations, U.S. Army, 1945–1946.; Commanding General, Mediterranean Theater of Operations, U.S. Army/Deputy Supreme Allied Commander, Mediterranean, 1946–1947.	(1887–1958)
57	Raymond A. Wheeler		21 Feb 1944	28 Feb 1949	5	Deputy Supreme Allied Commander, South East Asia, 1944–1945.; Chief of Engineers, U.S. Army, 1945–1949.	(1885–1974)
58	James H. Doolittle		13 Mar 1944	10 May 1946	2	Commanding General, Eighth Air Force, 1944–1945.	(1896–1993) Promoted to general on the retired list, 4 Apr 1985. Awarded Medal of Honor, 1942; Presidential Medal of Freedom, 1989.
59	Lewis H. Brereton		28 Apr 1944	1 Sep 1948	4	Commanding General, Ninth Air Force, 1943–1944.; Commanding General, First Allied Airborne Army, 1944–1945.; Commanding General, Third Air Force, 1945–1946.; Commanding General, First Air Force, 1946.; Special duty, Office of the Secretary of War, 1946–1947.; Chairman, Military Liaison Committee, Atomic Energy Commission, 1947–1948.; Secretary General, Air Board, 1948.	(1890–1967)
60	Barney M. Giles		28 Apr 1944	30 Jun 1946	2	Chief, Air Staff, 1943–1944.; Deputy Commanding General, Army Air Forces/Chief, Air Staff, 1944–1945.; Commanding General, U.S. Army Air Forces in the Pacific Ocean Area/Deputy Commanding General, U.S. Strategic Air Forces in the Pacific, 1945.; Commanding General, U.S. Strategic Air Forces in the Pacific, 1945–1946.	(1892–1984)
61	Alexander M. Patch		7 Aug 1944	21 Nov 1945	1	Commanding General, Seventh Army, 1944–1945.; Commanding General, Fourth Army, 1945.	(1889–1945) Promoted to general posthumously, 19 Jul 1954. Died in office.
62	Daniel I. Sultan		2 Sep 1944	14 Jan 1947	2	Deputy Commanding General, U.S. Army Forces, China Burma India Theater, 1943–1944.; Commander, U.S. Forces, India-Burma Theater, 1944–1945.; Inspector General, U.S. Army, 1945–1947.	(1885–1947) Died in office.
63	Thomas T. Handy		2 Sep 1944	13 Mar 1945	1	Deputy Chief of Staff, U.S. Army, 1944–1947.	(1892–1982) Promoted to general, 13 Mar 1945.
64	Lucian K. Truscott Jr.		2 Sep 1944	30 Sep 1947	3	Commanding General, VI Corps, 1944.; Commanding General, Fifteenth Army, 1944.; Commanding General, Fifth Army, 1944–1945.; Commanding General, Third Army, 1945–1946.	(1895–1965) Promoted to general on the retired list, 19 Jul 1954.
65	Wilhelm D. Styer		7 Nov 1944	29 Apr 1947	2	Deputy Commanding General/Chief of Staff, Army Service Forces, 1942–1945.; Commanding General, U.S. Army Forces, Western Pacific, 1945–1946.	(1893–1975) Son of Army general Henry Delp Styer; brother of Navy admiral Charles W. Styer Sr.; brother-in-law of Navy admiral Adrian M. Hurst; great-grandson of Navy admiral Charles Wilkes.
66	Leonard T. Gerow		1 Jan 1945	31 Jul 1950	6	Commanding General, V Corps, 1943–1945.; Commanding General, Fifteenth Army, 1945.; Commandant, Command and General Staff School, 1945–1948.; Commanding General, Second Army, 1948–1950.	(1888–1972) Promoted to general on the retired list, 19 Jul 1954. Brother of Army general Lee S. Gerow.
67	Albert C. Wedemeyer		1 Jan 1945	31 Jul 1951	7	Commander, U.S. Forces, China Theater, 1944–1946.; Commanding General, Second Army, 1946–1947.; Director, Plans and Operations, U.S. Army, 1947–1948.; Deputy Chief of Staff for Plans and Combat Operations, U.S. Army, 1948–1949.; Commanding General, Sixth Army, 1949–1951.	(1897–1989) Promoted to general on the retired list, 19 Jul 1954. Special Representative of the President in China and Korea, 1947. Awarded Presidential Medal of Freedom, 1985.
68	Harold L. George		16 Mar 1945	30 Dec 1946	2	Commanding General, Air Transport Command, 1942–1946.	(1893–1986)
69	John K. Cannon		17 Mar 1945	29 Oct 1951	7	Commander in Chief, Mediterranean Allied Air Forces/Commanding General, Twelfth Air Force, 1945.; Commanding General, U.S. Strategic Air Forces in Europe, 1945.; Commanding General, U.S. Air Forces in Europe, 1945–1946.; Commanding General, Air Training Command, 1946–1948.; Commanding General, U.S. Air Forces in Europe, 1948–1950.; Commander in Chief, U.S. Air Forces in Europe, 1950–1951.	(1892–1955) Promoted to general, 29 Oct 1951.
70	Hoyt S. Vandenberg		17 Mar 1945	1 Oct 1947	3	Commanding General, Ninth Air Force, 1944–1945.; Assistant Chief, Air Staff for Operations, 1945–1946.; Assistant Chief of Staff for Intelligence, U.S. Army, 1946.; Director, Central Intelligence Group, 1946–1947.; Deputy Commanding General, Army Air Forces/Chief, Air Staff, 1947.	(1899–1954) Promoted to general, 1 Oct 1947. Director of Central Intelligence, 1946–1947. Nephew of U.S. Senator Arthur H. Vandenberg; son married daughter of Air Force general Leon W. Johnson.
71	Edmund B. Gregory		14 Apr 1945	30 Jun 1946	1	Quartermaster General, U.S. Army, 1940–1946.	(1882–1961)
72	Oscar W. Griswold		14 Apr 1945	31 Oct 1947	3	Commanding General, XIV Corps, 1943–1946.; Commanding General, Seventh Army, 1946–1947.; Commanding General, Third Army, 1947.	(1886–1959)
73	Eugene Reybold		15 Apr 1945	30 Jan 1946	1	Chief of Engineers, U.S. Army, 1941–1945.	(1884–1961)
74	Walton H. Walker		15 Apr 1945	23 Dec 1950	6	Commanding General, XX Corps, 1944–1945.; Commanding General, Eighth Service Command, 1945–1946.; Commanding General, Sixth Service Command, 1946.; Commanding General, Fifth Army, 1946–1948.; Commanding General, Eighth Army, 1948–1950.	(1889–1950) Promoted to general posthumously, 2 Jan 1951. Died in office.
75	Wade H. Haislip		15 Apr 1945	1 Oct 1949	4	Commanding General, XV Corps, 1943–1945.; Commanding General, Seventh Army, 1945.; President, Secretary of War's Personnel Board, 1945–1946.; Senior Member, Chief of Staff's Advisory Group, 1946–1948.; Deputy Chief of Staff for Administration, U.S. Army, 1948–1949.	(1889–1971) Promoted to general, 1 Oct 1949. President, Association of the United States Army, 1950–1951; Governor, U.S. Soldiers' Home, 1951–1966.
76	Levin H. Campbell Jr.		16 Apr 1945	30 May 1946	1	Chief of Ordnance, U.S. Army, 1942–1946.	(1886–1976)
77	J. Lawton Collins		16 Apr 1945	24 Jan 1948	3	Commanding General, VII Corps, 1944–1945.; Deputy Commanding General/Chief of Staff, Army Ground Forces, 1945.; Chief of Information, U.S. Army, 1946–1947.; Deputy Chief of Staff, U.S. Army, 1947–1948.	(1896–1987) Promoted to general, 24 Jan 1948. U.S. Special Representative to Vietnam, 1954–1955.
78	Geoffrey Keyes		17 Apr 1945	1 Aug 1954	9	Commanding General, II Corps, 1943–1945.; Commanding General, Seventh Army, 1945–1946.; Commanding General, Third Army, 1946–1947.; Commanding General, U.S. Forces Austria/U.S. High Commissioner for Austria, 1947–1950.; Director, Weapons Systems Evaluation Group, 1951–1954.	(1888–1967)
79	Lucius D. Clay		17 Apr 1945	28 Mar 1947	2	Deputy Commanding General, U.S. Forces, European Theater/Deputy Military Governor, U.S. Occupation Zone in Germany, 1945–1947.	(1897–1978) Promoted to general, 28 Mar 1947. Special Representative of the President in Berlin, 1961–1962. Son of U.S. Senator Alexander S. Clay; father of Air Force general Lucius D. Clay Jr.
80	George E. Stratemeyer		28 May 1945	31 Jan 1952	7	Commanding General, Eastern Air Command/U.S. Army Air Forces, India-Burma Theater, 1944–1945.; Commanding General, U.S. Army Air Forces, China Theater, 1945–1946.; Commanding General, Air Defense Command, 1946–1948.; Commanding General, Continental Air Command, 1948–1949.; Commanding General, Far East Air Forces, 1949–1951.	(1890–1969)
81	Alvan C. Gillem Jr.		3 Jun 1945	31 Aug 1950	5	Commanding General, XIII Corps, 1943–1945.; Commanding General, VII Corps, 1945–1946.; Commanding General, U.S. Army Forces in China, 1946–1947.; Commanding General, Third Army, 1947–1950.	(1888–1973) Grandson of Union Army general Alvan C. Gillem; father of Army general Alvan C. Gillem II.
82	Willis D. Crittenberger		3 Jun 1945	31 Dec 1952	8	Commanding General, IV Corps, 1944–1945.; Commanding General, Panama Canal Department/Caribbean Defense Command, 1945–1947.; Commander in Chief, Caribbean Command, 1947–1948.; U.S. Representative, Inter-American Defense Board, 1948–1950.; Commanding General, First Army, 1950–1952.	(1890–1980) Chairman, Free Europe Committee, 1956–1959.
83	Charles P. Hall		4 Jun 1945	31 Dec 1948	4	Commanding General, XI Corps, 1942–1946.; Director, Organization and Training, U.S. Army, 1946–1948.	(1886–1953)
84	Matthew B. Ridgway		4 Jun 1945	11 May 1951	6	Commanding General, XVIII Airborne Corps, 1944–1945.; Commanding General, Mediterranean Theater of Operations, U.S. Army/Deputy Supreme Allied Commander, Mediterranean, 1945–1946.; U.S. Army Representative, Military Staff Committee, United Nations, 1946–1948.; Commander in Chief, Caribbean Command, 1948–1949.; Deputy Chief of Staff for Administration, U.S. Army, 1949–1950.; Commanding General, Eighth Army, 1950–1951.; Supreme Commander, Allied Powers/Commander in Chief, United Nations Command/Commander in Chief, Far East Command (SCAP/CINCUNC/CINCFE), 1951.	(1895–1993) Promoted to general, 11 May 1951. Awarded Presidential Medal of Freedom, 1986; Congressional Gold Medal, 1990.
85	LeRoy Lutes		5 Jun 1945	31 Jan 1952	7	Deputy Commanding General/Chief of Staff, Army Service Forces, 1945–1946.; Commanding General, Army Service Forces, 1946.; Director, Service, Supply, and Procurement, U.S. Army, 1946–1948.; Commanding General, Fourth Army, 1949–1952.	(1890–1980)
86	Troy H. Middleton		5 Jun 1945	10 Aug 1945	0	Commanding General, VIII Corps, 1944–1945.	(1889–1976) President, Louisiana State University, 1951–1962.
87	Nathan F. Twining		5 Jun 1945	10 Oct 1950	5	Commanding General, Mediterranean Allied Strategic Air Forces/Fifteenth Air Force, 1943–1945.; Commanding General, Twentieth Air Force, 1945.; Commanding General, Air Materiel Command, 1946–1947.; Commanding General, Alaskan Department, 1947.; Commander in Chief, Alaskan Command, 1947–1950.; Deputy Chief of Staff for Personnel, U.S. Air Force, 1950.	(1897–1982) Promoted to general, 10 Oct 1950. Brother of Marine Corps general Merrill B. Twining.
88	Ennis C. Whitehead		5 Jun 1945	31 Jul 1951	6	Commanding General, Fifth Air Force, 1944–1945.; Commanding General, Pacific Air Command, U.S. Army, 1945–1947.; Commanding General, Far East Air Forces, 1947–1949.; Commanding General, Continental Air Command, 1949–1950.; Commanding General, Continental Air Command/Air Defense Command, 1950.; Commanding General, Air Defense Command, 1950–1951.	(1895–1964) Father of Army general Ennis C. Whitehead Jr.; grandfather of Army general Ennis C. Whitehead III.
89	John R. Hodge		6 Jun 1945	5 Jul 1952	7	Commanding General, XXIV Corps, 1944–1945.; Commanding General, XXIV Corps/U.S. Army Forces in Korea, 1945–1948.; Commanding General, V Corps, 1948–1950.; Commanding General, Third Army, 1950–1952.; Chief, Army Field Forces, 1952–1953.	(1893–1963) Promoted to general, 5 Jul 1952.
90	John E. Hull		6 Jun 1945	30 Jul 1951	6	Assistant Chief of Staff, Operations Division, U.S. Army, 1944–1946.; Director, Plans and Operations, U.S. Army, 1946.; Commander, U.S. Army Forces, Middle Pacific, 1946–1947.; Commanding General, U.S. Army, Pacific, 1947–1949.; Director, Weapons Systems Evaluation Group, 1949–1951.; Deputy Chief of Staff for Operations and Administration, U.S. Army, 1951.	(1895–1975) Promoted to general, 30 Jul 1951.
91	Raymond S. McLain		6 Jun 1945	30 Apr 1952	7	Commanding General, XIX Corps, 1944–1945.; Chief of Information, U.S. Army, 1948–1949.; Comptroller, U.S. Army, 1949–1952.	(1890–1954) President, Association of the United States Army, 1951–1952.
92	Clarence R. Huebner		17 Mar 1947	30 Nov 1950	4	Deputy Commander in Chief, U.S. European Command, 1947–1950.	(1888–1972)
93	Manton S. Eddy		24 Jan 1948	31 Mar 1953	5	Commandant, Command and General Staff College, 1948–1950.; Commanding General, Seventh Army, 1950–1952.; Commander in Chief, U.S. Army Europe, 1952–1953.	(1892–1962)
94	Stephen J. Chamberlin		24 Jan 1948	31 Dec 1951	4	Director, Intelligence, U.S. Army, 1946–1948.; Commanding General, Fifth Army, 1948–1951.	(1889–1971)
95	Henry S. Aurand		24 Jan 1948	31 Aug 1952	5	Director, Service, Supply, and Procurement, U.S. Army, 1948.; Director, Logistics, U.S. Army, 1948–1949.; Commanding General, U.S. Army Pacific, 1949–1952.	(1894–1980) Father of Navy admiral Evan P. Aurand.
96	Willard S. Paul		24 Jan 1948	31 Dec 1948	1	Director, Personnel and Administration, U.S. Army, 1946–1948.	(1894–1966) President, Gettysburg College, 1956–1961.
97	Leslie R. Groves		24 Jan 1948	29 Feb 1948	0	Chief, Armed Forces Special Weapons Project/Member, Military Liaison Committee, Atomic Energy Commission, 1947–1948.	(1896–1970)
98	James A. Van Fleet		19 Feb 1948	31 Jul 1951	3	Director, Joint U.S. Military Advisory and Planning Group in Greece, 1948–1950.; Commanding General, Second Army, 1950–1951.; Commanding General, Eighth Army, 1951–1953.	(1892–1992) Promoted to general, 31 Jul 1951. Special Representative of the President in the Far East, 1954.
99	Edward H. Brooks		18 Mar 1949	30 Apr 1953	4	Director, Personnel and Administration, U.S. Army, 1949–1950.; Assistant Chief of Staff, G-1, Personnel, U.S. Army, 1950–1951.; Commanding General, Second Army, 1951–1953.	(1893–1978)
100	Thomas B. Larkin		21 Mar 1949	31 Dec 1952	4	Director, Logistics, U.S. Army, 1949–1950.; Assistant Chief of Staff, G-4, Logistics, U.S. Army, 1950–1952.	(1890–1968)
101	Harold R. Bull		25 Jul 1949	31 Jul 1952	3	Commandant, National War College, 1949–1952.	(1893–1976)
102	Alfred M. Gruenther		30 Sep 1949	1 Aug 1951	2	Deputy Chief of Staff for Plans and Combat Operations, U.S. Army, 1949–1950.; Deputy Chief of Staff for Plans, U.S. Army, 1950–1951.; Chief, Advanced Planning Group, 1951.; Chief of Staff, Supreme Headquarters Allied Powers Europe, 1951–1953.	(1899–1983) Promoted to general, 1 Aug 1951. President, American Red Cross, 1957–1964.
103	William H. H. Morris Jr.		1 Oct 1949	31 Mar 1952	2	Commander in Chief, Caribbean Command, 1949–1952.	(1890–1971)
104	Stafford L. Irwin		15 Oct 1950	31 May 1952	2	Commanding General, U.S. Forces Austria, 1950–1952.	(1893–1955) Son of Army general George LeRoy Irwin.
105	Frank W. Milburn		8 Feb 1951	30 Apr 1952	1	Commanding General, I Corps, 1950–1951.; Inspector of Infantry, Office of the Chief of Army Field Forces, 1951–1952.	(1892–1962)
106	Joseph M. Swing		9 Feb 1951	28 Feb 1954	3	Commandant, Army War College, 1951.; Commanding General, Sixth Army, 1951–1954.	(1894–1984) Commissioner of Immigration and Naturalization, 1954–1962.
107	John W. Leonard		10 Feb 1951	31 Jan 1952	1	Commanding General, V Corps, 1950–1951.; Commanding General, XVIII Airborne Corps, 1951–1952.	(1890–1974)
108	John B. Coulter		11 Feb 1951	31 Jan 1952	1	Deputy Commanding General, Eighth Army, 1951–1952.	(1891–1983) Agent-General, United Nations Korean Reconstruction Agency, 1953–1958.
109	Edward M. Almond		12 Feb 1951	31 Jan 1953	2	Commanding General, X Corps/Chief of Staff, Supreme Commander, Allied Powers/United Nations Command/Far East Command, 1950–1951.; Commanding General, X Corps, 1951.; Commandant, Army War College, 1951–1953.	(1892–1979)
110	Charles L. Bolte		13 Feb 1951	30 Jul 1953	2	Deputy Chief of Staff for Plans, U.S. Army, 1951–1952.; Deputy Chief of Staff for Plans and Research, U.S. Army, 1952.; Commanding General, Seventh Army, 1952–1953.; Commander in Chief, U.S. Army Europe, 1953.	(1895–1989) Promoted to general, 30 Jul 1953.
111	William M. Hoge		31 May 1951	23 Oct 1953	2	Commanding General, IX Corps, 1951–1952.; Commanding General, Fourth Army, 1952–1953.; Commanding General, Seventh Army, 1953.; Commander in Chief, U.S. Army Europe, 1953–1955.	(1894–1979) Promoted to general, 23 Oct 1953.
112	Doyle O. Hickey		1 Jun 1951	31 Jul 1953	2	Chief of Staff, Supreme Commander, Allied Powers/United Nations Command/Far East Command, 1951–1952.; Chief of Staff, United Nations Command/Far East Command, 1952–1953.	(1891–1961)
113	Maxwell D. Taylor		29 Jul 1951	23 Jun 1953	2	Deputy Chief of Staff for Operations and Administration, U.S. Army, 1951–1953.; Commanding General, Eighth Army, 1953–1954.	(1901–1987) Promoted to general, 23 Jun 1953. U.S. Ambassador to South Vietnam, 1964–1965; chairman, President's Foreign Intelligence Advisory Board, 1965–1969; President, Institute for Defense Analyses, 1966–1969.
114	Andrew D. Bruce		30 Jul 1951	31 Aug 1954	3	Commandant, Armed Forces Staff College, 1951–1954.	(1894–1969) President, University of Houston, 1954–1956.
115	Lewis A. Pick		31 Jul 1951	30 Nov 1952	1	Chief of Engineers, U.S. Army, 1949–1953.	(1890–1956)
116	Anthony C. McAuliffe		1 Aug 1951	1 Mar 1955	4	Assistant Chief of Staff, G-1, Personnel, U.S. Army, 1951–1953.; Commanding General, Seventh Army, 1953–1955.; Commander in Chief, U.S. Army Europe, 1955–1956.	(1898–1975) Promoted to general, 1 Mar 1955.
117	John W. O'Daniel		20 Dec 1951	29 Feb 1956	4	Commanding General, I Corps, 1951–1952.; Commanding General, U.S. Army Pacific, 1952–1954.; Chief, Military Assistance Advisory Group, Indo-China, 1954–1955.; Chief, Military Assistance Advisory Group, Vietnam, 1955.	(1894–1975)
118	Horace L. McBride		29 Apr 1952	30 Jun 1954	2	Commander in Chief, Caribbean Command, 1952–1954.	(1894–1962)
119	Willard G. Wyman		8 Jun 1952	1 Mar 1956	4	Commanding General, IX Corps, 1951–1952.; Commander in Chief, Allied Land Forces South-Eastern Europe (NATO), 1952–1954.; Commanding General, Sixth Army, 1954–1955.; Deputy Commanding General, Continental Army Command, 1955–1956.	(1898–1969) Promoted to general, 1 Mar 1956.
120	Williston B. Palmer		9 Jun 1952	1 May 1955	3	Commanding General, X Corps, 1951–1952.; Assistant Chief of Staff, G-4, Logistics, U.S. Army, 1952–1954.; Deputy Chief of Staff for Logistics, U.S. Army, 1954–1955.	(1899–1973) Promoted to general, 1 May 1955. Brother of Army general Charles D. Palmer.
121	George H. Decker		10 Jun 1952	31 May 1956	4	Comptroller, U.S. Army, 1952–1955.; Commanding General, VII Corps, 1955–1956.	(1902–1980) Promoted to general, 31 May 1956. President, Association of the United States Army, 1952–1955.
122	John T. Lewis		4 Jul 1952	30 Sep 1954	2	Commanding General, Army Anti-Aircraft Command, 1952–1954.	(1894–1983)
123	George P. Hays		5 Jul 1952	30 Apr 1953	1	Commanding General, U.S. Forces Austria, 1952–1953.	(1892–1978) Awarded Medal of Honor, 1919.
124	Daniel Noce		29 Jul 1952	31 Oct 1954	2	Inspector General, U.S. Army, 1952–1954.	(1894–1976)
125	Alexander R. Bolling		30 Jul 1952	31 Jul 1955	3	Commanding General, Third Army, 1952–1955.	(1895–1964) Father of Army general Alexander R. Bolling Jr.; father-in-law of Army general Roderick Wetherill Sr.
126	William B. Kean		31 Jul 1952	30 Sep 1954	2	Commanding General, Fifth Army, 1952–1954.	(1897–1981) Executive Director, Chicago Housing Authority, 1954–1957.
127	Lyman L. Lemnitzer		1 Aug 1952	25 Mar 1955	3	Deputy Chief of Staff for Plans and Research, U.S. Army, 1952–1955.	(1899–1988) Promoted to general, 25 Mar 1955. President, Association of the United States Army, 1955. Awarded Presidential Medal of Freedom, 1987.
128	William K. Harrison Jr.		5 Sep 1952	28 Feb 1957	4	Deputy Commanding General, U.S. Army Forces Far East, 1952–1953.; Chief of Staff, United Nations Command/Far East Command, 1953–1954.; Commander in Chief, Caribbean Command, 1954–1957.	(1895–1987)
129	Paul W. Kendall		16 Sep 1952	31 Aug 1955	3	Commanding General, I Corps, 1952–1953.; Deputy Commanding General, U.S. Army Forces Far East, 1953–1954.; Commander in Chief, Allied Land Forces South-Eastern Europe (NATO), 1954–1955.	(1898–1983)
130	Reuben E. Jenkins		6 Nov 1952	28 Feb 1954	1	Commanding General, IX Corps, 1952–1953.; Commanding General, X Corps, 1953.	(1896–1975)
131	Isaac D. White		7 Nov 1952	22 Jun 1955	3	Commanding General, X Corps, 1952–1953.; Commanding General, Fourth Army, 1953–1955.	(1901–1990) Promoted to general, 22 Jun 1955.
132	Withers A. Burress		1 Jan 1953	30 Nov 1954	2	Commanding General, First Army, 1953–1954.	(1894–1977) Commandant, Virginia Military Institute, 1935–1940.
133	Ralph J. Canine		16 Mar 1953	30 Apr 1957	4	Director, National Security Agency, 1952–1956.	(1895–1969)
134	John E. Dahlquist		1 May 1953	18 Aug 1954	1	Commanding General, Fourth Army, 1953.; Assistant Chief, Army Field Forces, 1953.; Chief, Army Field Forces, 1953–1955.	(1896–1975) Promoted to general, 18 Aug 1954.
135	William H. Arnold		22 Jun 1953	31 Jan 1961	8	Commanding General, U.S. Forces Austria, 1953–1955.; Commanding General, Fifth Army, 1955–1961.	(1901–1976)
136	Bruce C. Clarke		23 Jun 1953	1 Aug 1958	5	Commanding General, I Corps, 1953.; Commanding General, X Corps, 1953–1954.; Commanding General, U.S. Army Pacific, 1954–1956.; Commanding General, Seventh Army, 1956–1958.	(1901–1988) Promoted to general, 1 Aug 1958.
137	Cortlandt V. R. Schuyler		3 Jul 1953	18 May 1956	3	Chief of Staff, Supreme Headquarters Allied Powers Europe, 1953–1959.	(1900–1993) Promoted to general, 18 May 1956. Commissioner, New York State Office of General Services, 1960–1971.
138	Floyd L. Parks		13 Oct 1953	29 Feb 1956	2	Commanding General, Second Army, 1953–1956.	(1896–1959)
139	Walter L. Weible		23 Oct 1953	31 Jan 1957	3	Deputy Chief of Staff for Operations and Administration, U.S. Army, 1953–1955.; Deputy Chief of Staff for Personnel, U.S. Army, 1956–1957.	(1896–1980) President, Association of the United States Army, 1955–1956.
140	Thomas F. Hickey		25 Jan 1954	Sep 1961	7	Deputy Commanding General, U.S. Army Forces Far East, 1954.; Commanding General, IX Corps, 1954–1955.; Commanding General, Third Army, 1955–1958.; Director, Net Evaluation Subcommittee, National Security Council, 1958–1961.	(1898–1983)
141	Blackshear M. Bryan		26 Jan 1954	1 Mar 1960	6	Commanding General, I Corps, 1954.; Superintendent, U.S. Military Academy, 1954–1956.; Commanding General, U.S. Army Pacific, 1956–1957.; Commanding General, First Army, 1957–1960.	(1900–1977) President, Nassau Community College, 1960–1965.
142	Carter B. Magruder		6 Apr 1954	1 Jul 1959	5	Chief of Staff, United Nations Command/Far East Command, 1954–1955.; Deputy Chief of Staff for Logistics, U.S. Army, 1955–1959.	(1900–1988) Promoted to general, 1 Jul 1959.
143	Lemuel Mathewson		7 Apr 1954	1 Jul 1961	6	Director, Joint Staff, 1954–1955.; Commanding General, V Corps, 1956–1957.; Commanding General, Sixth Army, 1957–1958.; Chairman, Inter-American Defense Board, 1959–1961.	(1899–1970)
144	Henry I. Hodes		16 Aug 1954	1 Jun 1956	2	Commanding General, VII Corps, 1954–1955.; Commanding General, Seventh Army, 1955–1956.	(1899–1962) Promoted to general, 1 Jun 1956.
145	John H. Collier		17 Aug 1954	1 Oct 1958	4	Commanding General, I Corps, 1954.; Commanding General, I Corps/Deputy Commanding General, Eighth Army, 1954–1955.; Commanding General, I Corps, 1955.; Deputy Commanding General, U.S. Army Forces Far East/Eighth Army, 1955.; Commanding General, Fourth Army, 1955–1958.	(1898–1980)
146	Charles E. Hart		18 Aug 1954	1 Aug 1960	6	Commanding General, V Corps, 1954–1956.; Commanding General, Army Air Defense Command, 1957–1960.	(1900–1991)
147	Hobart R. Gay		30 Sep 1954	31 Aug 1955	1	Commanding General, Fifth Army, 1954–1955.	(1894–1983) Superintendent, New Mexico Military Institute, 1955–1963.
148	Stanley R. Mickelsen		1 Oct 1954	31 Oct 1957	3	Commanding General, Army Air Defense Command, 1952–1957.	(1895–1966)
149	Thomas W. Herren		9 Dec 1954	31 Jul 1957	3	Commanding General, First Army, 1954–1957.	(1895–1985)
150	Claude B. Ferenbaugh		10 Dec 1954	30 Sep 1955	1	Deputy Commanding General, U.S. Army Forces Far East/Eighth Army, 1954–1955.	(1899–1975)
151	Laurin L. Williams		1 Mar 1955	30 Jun 1957	2	Comptroller, U.S. Army, 1955–1957.	(1895–1975)
152	James M. Gavin		25 Mar 1955	31 Mar 1958	3	Deputy Chief of Staff for Plans, U.S. Army, 1955.; Chief of Research and Development, U.S. Army, 1955–1958.	(1907–1990) U.S. Ambassador to France, 1961–1962; President, Association of the United States Army, 1963–1965.
153	Robert N. Young		29 Jun 1955	30 Sep 1957	2	Commanding General, Sixth Army, 1955–1957.	(1900–1964)
154	Robert M. Montague		13 Jul 1955	20 Feb 1958	3	Commanding General, I Corps, 1955–1956.; Commander in Chief, Caribbean Command, 1956–1958.	(1899–1958) Died in office.
155	George W. Read Jr.		14 Jul 1955	1 Aug 1960	5	Commanding General, Allied Land Forces South-Eastern Europe (NATO), 1955–1957.; Commanding General, Second Army, 1957–1960.	(1900–1974) Son of Army general George W. Read; grandson of Army general Samuel B. M. Young.
156	Samuel D. Sturgis III		23 Jul 1955	30 Sep 1956	1	Chief of Engineers, U.S. Army, 1953–1956.	(1897–1964) Son of Army general Samuel D. Sturgis Jr.; grandson of Union Army general Samuel D. Sturgis.
157	Clovis E. Byers		8 Aug 1955	1 Jun 1959	4	Commandant, NATO Defense College, 1955–1957.; Military Adviser to the Assistant Secretary of Defense for International Security Affairs, 1957–1959.	(1899–1973)
158	Charles D. Palmer		19 Aug 1955	1 Oct 1959	4	Deputy Commanding General, U.S. Army Forces Far East/Eighth Army, 1955–1957.; Commanding General, U.S. Army Japan/Deputy Commander in Chief, United Nations Command/Deputy Commander, U.S. Forces Korea/Deputy Commanding General, Eighth Army, 1957–1958.; Commanding General, Sixth Army, 1958–1959.	(1902–1999) Promoted to general, 1 Oct 1959. Brother of Army general Williston B. Palmer.
159	Samuel T. Williams		15 Sep 1955	1 Sep 1960	5	Chief, Military Assistance Advisory Group, Vietnam, 1955–1960.	(1897–1984)
160	Clyde D. Eddleman		10 Oct 1955	1 Apr 1959	3	Deputy Chief of Staff for Plans, U.S. Army, 1955.; Deputy Chief of Staff for Military Operations, U.S. Army, 1956–1958.	(1902–1992) Promoted to general, 1 Apr 1959.
161	Alonzo P. Fox		12 Nov 1955	31 May 1959	4	Military Adviser to the Assistant Secretary of Defense for International Security Affairs, 1955–1957.; Deputy Assistant Secretary of Defense for National Security Council Affairs, 1957–1958.; Special Assistant to the Secretary of Defense, 1958–1959.	(1895–1984) Daughter married Army general Alexander M. Haig Jr.
162	James E. Moore		17 Feb 1956	21 Apr 1960	4	Commanding General, IX Corps/Ryukyu Command/Deputy Governor, Ryukyu Islands, 1956–1957.; Commanding General, IX Corps/U.S. Army Ryukyu Islands/Deputy Governor, Ryukyu Islands, 1957.; Commanding General, IX Corps/U.S. Army Ryukyu Islands/U.S. High Commissioner, Ryukyu Islands, 1957–1958.; Deputy Chief of Staff for Military Operations, U.S. Army, 1958–1959.	(1902–1986) Promoted to general, 21 Apr 1960.
163	Edward T. Williams		1 Mar 1956	28 Feb 1961	5	Deputy Commanding General, Continental Army Command, 1956–1958.; Commanding General, Fourth Army, 1959–1961.	(1901–1973)
164	Lewis B. Hershey		23 Jun 1956	23 Dec 1969	14	Director, Selective Service System, 1936–1970.	(1893–1977) Promoted to general on the retired list, 23 Dec 1969.
165	Emerson L. Cummings		18 Jul 1956	31 Mar 1962	6	Chief of Ordnance, U.S. Army, 1953–1958.; Commanding General, U.S. Army, Japan/Deputy Commander in Chief, United Nations Command/Deputy Commander, U.S. Forces Korea/Deputy Commanding General, Eighth Army, 1958.; Deputy Commander in Chief, United Nations Command/Deputy Commander, U.S. Forces Korea/Deputy Commanding General, Eighth Army, 1958–1960.; Commanding General, Fifth Army, 1961–1962.	(1902–1986)
166	Francis W. Farrell		19 Jul 1956	1 Jul 1960	4	Special Assistant to the Joint Chiefs of Staff for National Security Council Affairs, 1955–1957.; Commanding General, V Corps, 1957–1959.; Commanding General, Seventh Army, 1959–1960.	(1900–1981) Director, New York State Civil Defense Commission, 1961–1963.
167	John F. Uncles		20 Jul 1956	1 Sep 1958	2	Commanding General, VII Corps, 1956–1958.	(1898–1967) Daughter married Army general Burnside E. Huffman.
168	Ridgely Gaither		27 Jul 1956	30 Apr 1962	6	Deputy Commanding General for Reserve Forces, Continental Army Command, 1956–1958.; Commander in Chief, Caribbean Command, 1958–1960.; Commanding General, Second Army, 1960–1962.	(1903–1992) Commissioner, Annapolis Police Department, 1966–1973.
*	Hanford MacNider		7 Aug 1956	(none)	0	(none)	(1889–1968) National Commander, American Legion, 1921–1922; U.S. Assistant Secretary of War, 1925–1928; U.S. Ambassador to Canada, 1930–1932.
169	Arthur G. Trudeau		18 Oct 1956	30 Jun 1962	6	Commanding General, I Corps, 1956–1958.; Chief of Research and Development, U.S. Army, 1958–1962.	(1902–1991)
170	David A. D. Ogden		24 Mar 1957	31 Oct 1957	1	Inspector General, U.S. Army, 1956–1957.	(1897–1969)
171	Donald P. Booth		21 Feb 1957	28 Feb 1962	5	Deputy Chief of Staff for Personnel, U.S. Army, 1957–1958.; Commanding General, IX Corps/U.S. Army Ryukyu Islands/U.S. High Commissioner, Ryukyu Islands, 1958–1961.; Commanding General, Fourth Army, 1961–1962.	(1902–1993)
172	Garrison H. Davidson		25 Mar 1957	30 Apr 1964	7	Superintendent, U.S. Military Academy, 1956–1960.; Commanding General, Seventh Army, 1960–1962.; Commanding General, First Army, 1962–1964.	(1904–1992)
173	William S. Lawton		1 Jul 1957	1 Jun 1960	3	Comptroller, U.S. Army, 1957–1960.	(1900–1993)
174	Robert M. Cannon		30 Jun 1957	31 Aug 1961	4	Deputy Commander in Chief/Chief of Staff, U.S. Army Pacific, 1957–1959.; Commanding General, Sixth Army, 1959–1961.	(1901–1976)
175	Paul D. Harkins		1 Jul 1957	2 Jan 1962	5	Commander, Allied Land Forces South-Eastern Europe (NATO), 1957–1960.; Deputy Commander in Chief/Chief of Staff, U.S. Army Pacific, 1960–1962.	(1904–1987) Promoted to general, 2 Jan 1962.
176	Thomas J. H. Trapnell		4 Feb 1958	31 Jul 1962	4	Commanding General, I Corps, 1958–1959.; Deputy Commander in Chief/Chief of Staff, U.S. Army Pacific, 1959–1960.; Commanding General, XVIII Airborne Corps, 1960–1961.; Commanding General, Third Army, 1961–1962.	(1902–2002)
177	James F. Collins		15 Mar 1958	1 Apr 1961	3	Deputy Chief of Staff for Personnel, U.S. Army, 1958–1961.	(1905–1989) Promoted to general, 1 Apr 1961. President, American Red Cross, 1964–1970.
178	Herbert B. Powell		8 Apr 1958	1 Oct 1960	2	Deputy Commanding General for Reserve Forces, Continental Army Command, 1958–1960.; Commanding General, Third Army, 1960.	(1903–1998) Promoted to general, 1 Oct 1960. U.S. Ambassador to New Zealand, 1963–1967.
179	Clark L. Ruffner		1 May 1958	1 Mar 1960	2	Commanding General, Third Army, 1958–1960.	(1903–1982) Promoted to general, 1 Mar 1960.
180	James D. O'Connell		11 Jul 1958	1 May 1959	1	Chief Signal Officer, U.S. Army, 1955–1959.	(1899–1984) Special Assistant to the President for Telecommunications and Director of Telecommunications Management, Office of Emergency Planning, 1964–1969.
181	Thomas L. Harrold		1 Aug 1958	30 Jun 1961	3	Commandant, National War College, 1958–1961.	(1902–1973)
182	Gordon B. Rogers		1 Sep 1958	31 Aug 1961	3	Commanding General, VII Corps, 1958–1959.; Deputy Commanding General for Development, Continental Army Command, 1959–1961.	(1901–1967)
183	Guy S. Meloy Jr.		1 Oct 1958	1 Jul 1961	3	Commanding General, Fourth Army, 1958–1959.; Commanding General, VII Corps, 1959–1961.; Deputy Commanding General, Eighth Army, 1961.	(1903–1968) Promoted to general, 1 Jul 1961. Father of Army general Guy S. Meloy III.
184	Paul D. Adams		1 Apr 1959	3 Oct 1961	3	Commanding General, V Corps, 1959–1960.; Commanding General, Third Army, 1960–1961.	(1906–1987) Promoted to general, 3 Oct 1961.
185	Robert W. Colglazier Jr.		17 Jul 1959	1 Feb 1966	7	Deputy Chief of Staff for Logistics, U.S. Army, 1959–1964.; Commanding General, Fourth Army, 1964–1966.	(1904–1993)
186	Emerson C. Itschner		6 Sep 1959	31 Aug 1961	2	Chief of Engineers, U.S. Army, 1956–1961.	(1903–1991)
187	John H. Hinrichs		7 Sep 1959	31 May 1962	3	Chief of Ordnance, U.S. Army, 1958–1962.	(1904–1990) Resigned, 1962.
188	Robert F. Sink		8 Sep 1959	1 Feb 1961	1	Commanding General, XVIII Airborne Corps, 1957–1960.; Commander in Chief, Caribbean Command, 1960–1961.	(1905–1965)
189	Leonard D. Heaton		9 Sep 1959	1 Sep 1969	10	Surgeon General, U.S. Army, 1959–1969.	(1902–1983)
190	John C. Oakes		1 Nov 1959	31 Dec 1963	3	Deputy Chief of Staff for Military Operations, U.S. Army, 1959–1961.; Commanding General, VII Corps, 1961–1962.; Commanding General, Seventh Army, 1962–1963.	(1906–1982) Grandson of U.S. Representative Robert B. Hawley.

== Timeline ==
An officer held the active-duty grade of lieutenant general (Lt.gen.) in the U.S. Army until his death; retirement; resignation; reversion to lower permanent grade upon vacating a position carrying the ex officio rank; promotion to a higher grade such as general (Gen.) or general of the Army (Gen.Army); or transfer to the U.S. Air Force (USAF). A brevet lieutenant general (Bvt.lt.gen.) remained in the grade of major general. Grades in the Continental Army (CA) did not continue with the U.S. Army.

== History ==
=== Quasi-War ===
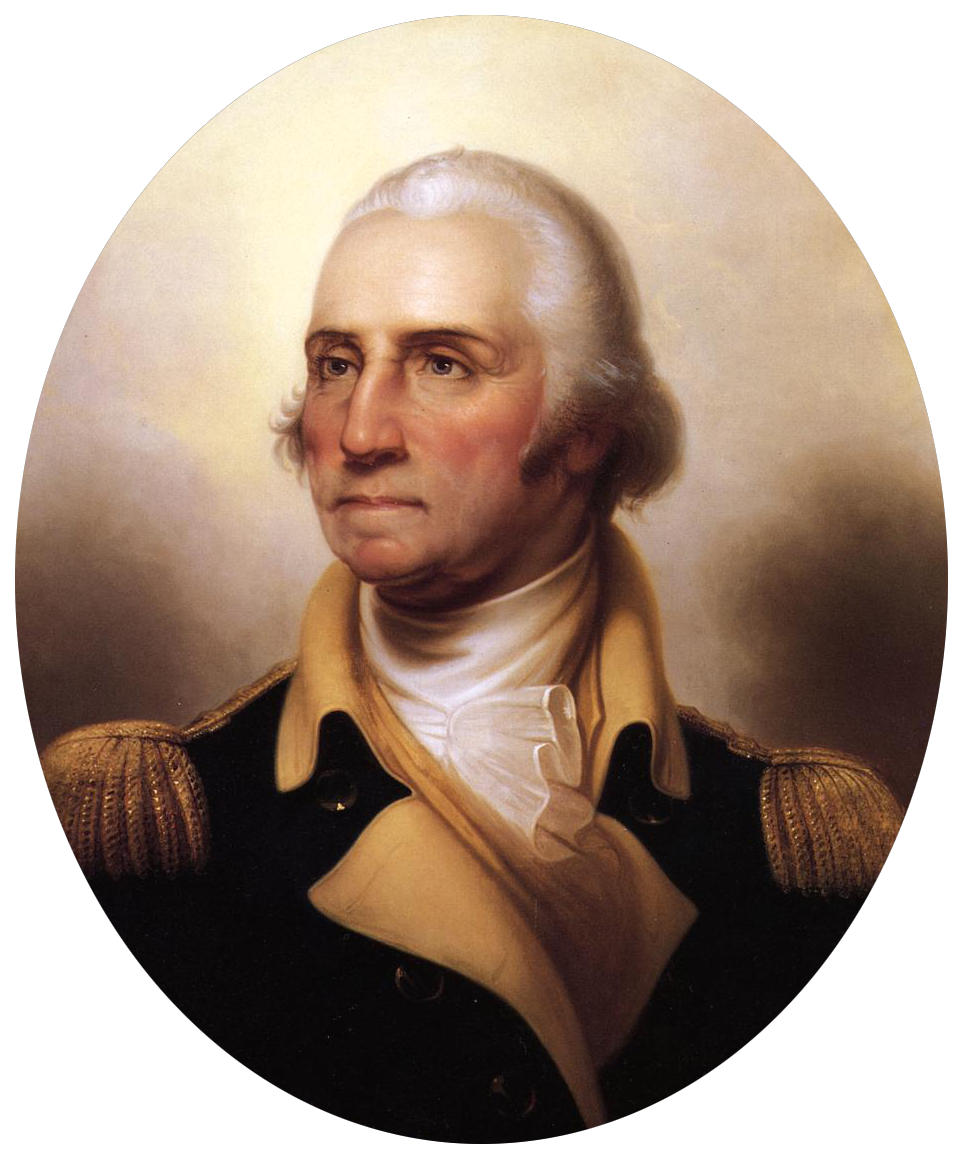
George Washington

The rank of lieutenant general in the United States Army was established in 1798 when President John Adams commissioned George Washington in that grade to command the armies of the United States during the Quasi-War with France. The next year, Congress replaced the office of lieutenant general with that of General of the Armies of the United States but Washington died before accepting the new commission, remaining a lieutenant general until posthumously promoted to General of the Armies in 1976.

=== Mexican War ===
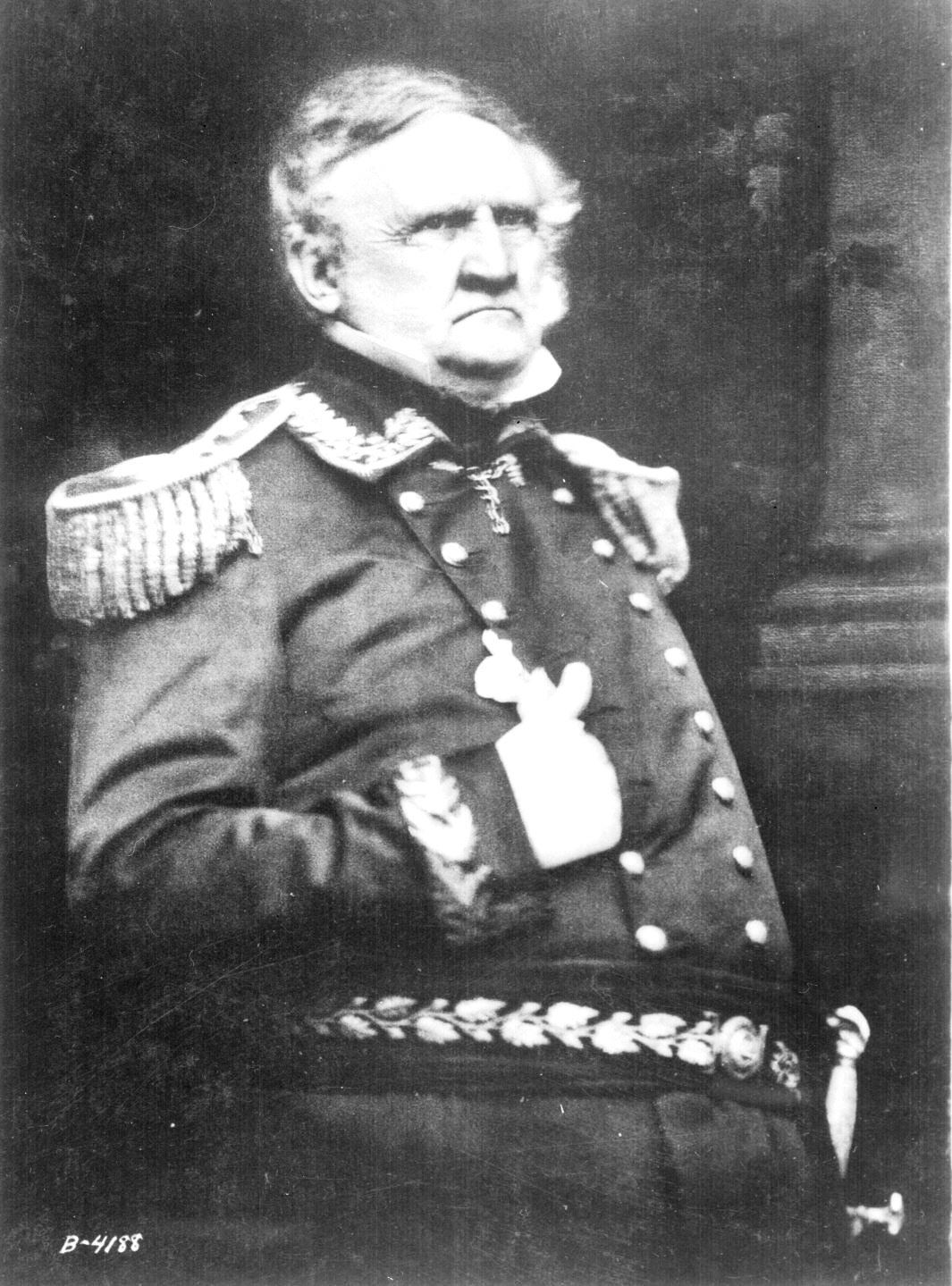
Winfield Scott

In 1855 Congress rewarded the Mexican War service of Major General Winfield Scott by authorizing his promotion to brevet lieutenant general, to rank from March 29, 1847, the date of the Mexican surrender at the Siege of Veracruz. As a lieutenant general only by brevet, Scott remained in the permanent grade of major general but was entitled to be paid as a lieutenant general from the date of his brevet commission, resulting in a public tussle with Secretary of War Jefferson Davis over the amount of backpay Scott was owed. Congress resolved all issues in Scott's favor once Davis left office in 1857, and allowed Scott to retire at full pay in 1861.

=== Civil War ===
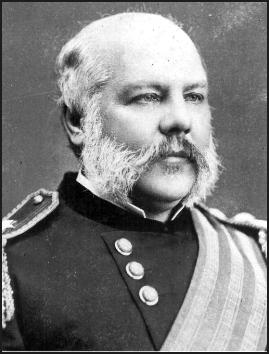
John M. Schofield

The grade of lieutenant general was revived in February 1864 to allow President Abraham Lincoln to promote Major General Ulysses S. Grant to command the armies of the United States during the American Civil War. After the war, Grant was promoted to general and his vacant lieutenant general grade was filled by Major General William T. Sherman. When Grant became president in 1869, Sherman succeeded him as general and Major General Philip H. Sheridan succeeded Sherman as lieutenant general. Congress suspended further promotions to general and lieutenant general in 1870, but made an exception in 1888 to promote Sheridan on his deathbed by discontinuing the grade of lieutenant general and merging it with the grade of general.

In 1895 Congress briefly revived the grade of lieutenant general to promote Sheridan's successor as commanding general of the Army, Major General John M. Schofield. Schofield had lobbied for the grade to be permanently reestablished in order to cement the primacy of all future commanding generals over the Army's other major generals. However, Congress regarded the lieutenant generalcy as the penultimate military accolade, second only to promotion to full general, and refused to devalue the title's significance by conferring it on any future commanding general less eminent than previous recipients. Instead, Schofield himself was promoted to lieutenant general as a one-time personal honor eight months before he retired. In retirement Schofield argued that the rank of lieutenant general ought to be permanently associated with the office of commanding general, not the individual officers occupying it, and that an officer serving as commanding general should hold the ex officio rank of lieutenant general while so detailed but revert to his permanent grade of major general upon leaving office. Over the next five decades, Schofield's concept of lieutenant general as temporary ex officio rank would slowly prevail over the concept of lieutenant general as permanent personal grade.

=== Spanish–American War ===
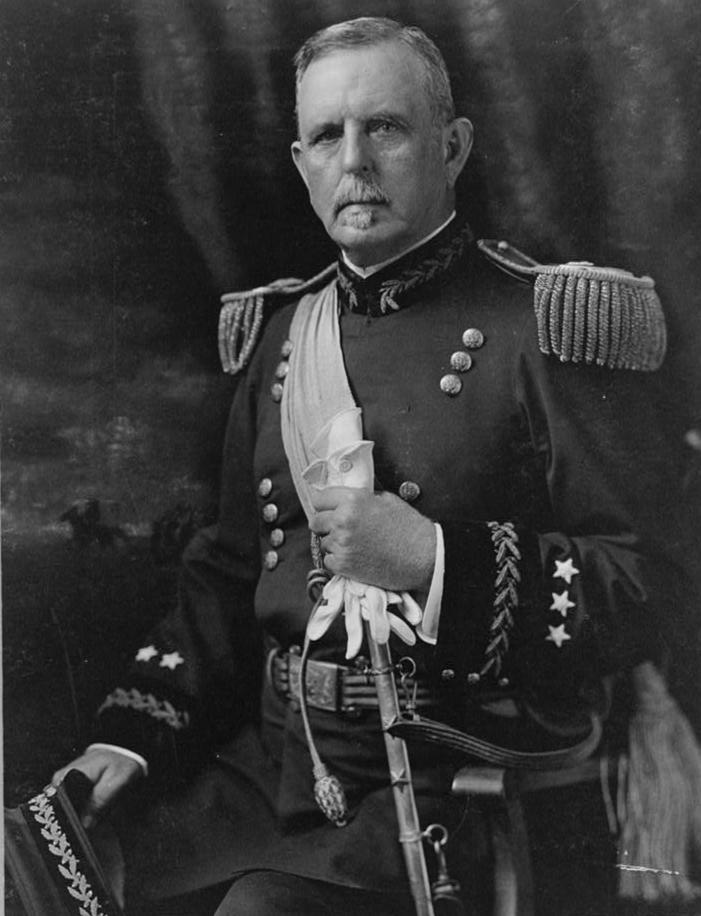
Henry C. Corbin

The question of whether the lieutenant generalcy should be a permanent personal grade or a temporary ex officio rank was phrased in terms of the line of the Army, whose officers commanded combat formations, and its staff, whose officers performed specialized support functions. Permanent personal promotions to general officer grades were only available in the line, but staff officers could temporarily acquire general officer rank while detailed to an office bearing that statutory rank, so officers holding the permanent grade of general officer were called general officers of the line and ex officio general officers were called general officers of the staff.

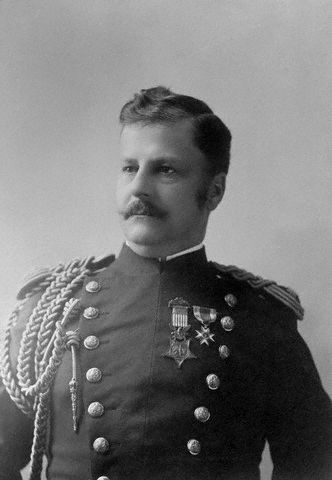
Arthur MacArthur Jr.

In June 1900 Schofield's successor as commanding general, Major General Nelson A. Miles, was made a lieutenant general of the staff by an amendment to the United States Military Academy appropriations bill that granted the rank of lieutenant general to the senior major general of the line commanding the Army. Eight months later, the 1901 Army reorganization bill replaced this ex officio rank with the permanent grade of lieutenant general of the line. When Miles retired in 1903, the senior major general was Adjutant General Henry C. Corbin, but as a staff corps officer Corbin was ineligible to command the Army, so the lieutenant generalcy went instead to the senior major general of the line, Samuel B. M. Young. Young reached the statutory retirement age five months later and was succeeded by Adna R. Chaffee. Seniority and scheduled retirements suggested that Chaffee would be succeeded in 1906 by Arthur MacArthur Jr., but both Corbin and Major General John C. Bates were scheduled to retire for age that year and it was decided that MacArthur's ascension would not be materially delayed by first promoting Bates and Corbin to lieutenant general for the few months of active duty remaining to them.

Corbin's promotion became controversial when he declined to be detailed as chief of staff of the Army. Corbin felt the chief of staff should be a younger officer with the time and energy to enact a long-range program, not a superannuated placeholder on the cusp of retirement, so when Bates retired Corbin became lieutenant general but Brigadier General J. Franklin Bell became chief of staff. However, by divorcing the Army's highest grade from its highest office, Corbin had again reduced the lieutenant generalcy to a personal honor. Many in Congress believed Corbin was not in the same class as Grant, Sherman, Sheridan, and Schofield, and pressed to abolish the lieutenant generalcy immediately, but after a heated debate MacArthur's supporters managed to preserve the grade until after MacArthur's promotion.

MacArthur was promoted to lieutenant general in August 1906. Since he was the last Civil War officer expected to succeed to the grade, Congress stopped further promotions to lieutenant general in March 1907 and stated that the active-duty grade would be abolished when MacArthur retired. Later that month, MacArthur asked to be relieved of his duties, disgruntled at his anomalous position of being the ranking officer of the Army yet consigned to the command of a mere division and subject to orders from an officer he outranked, Chief of Staff Bell, whose four-year term extended beyond MacArthur's statutory retirement date. MacArthur returned home to Milwaukee, Wisconsin, where he marked time writing up travel reports until he retired in 1909.

=== World War I ===
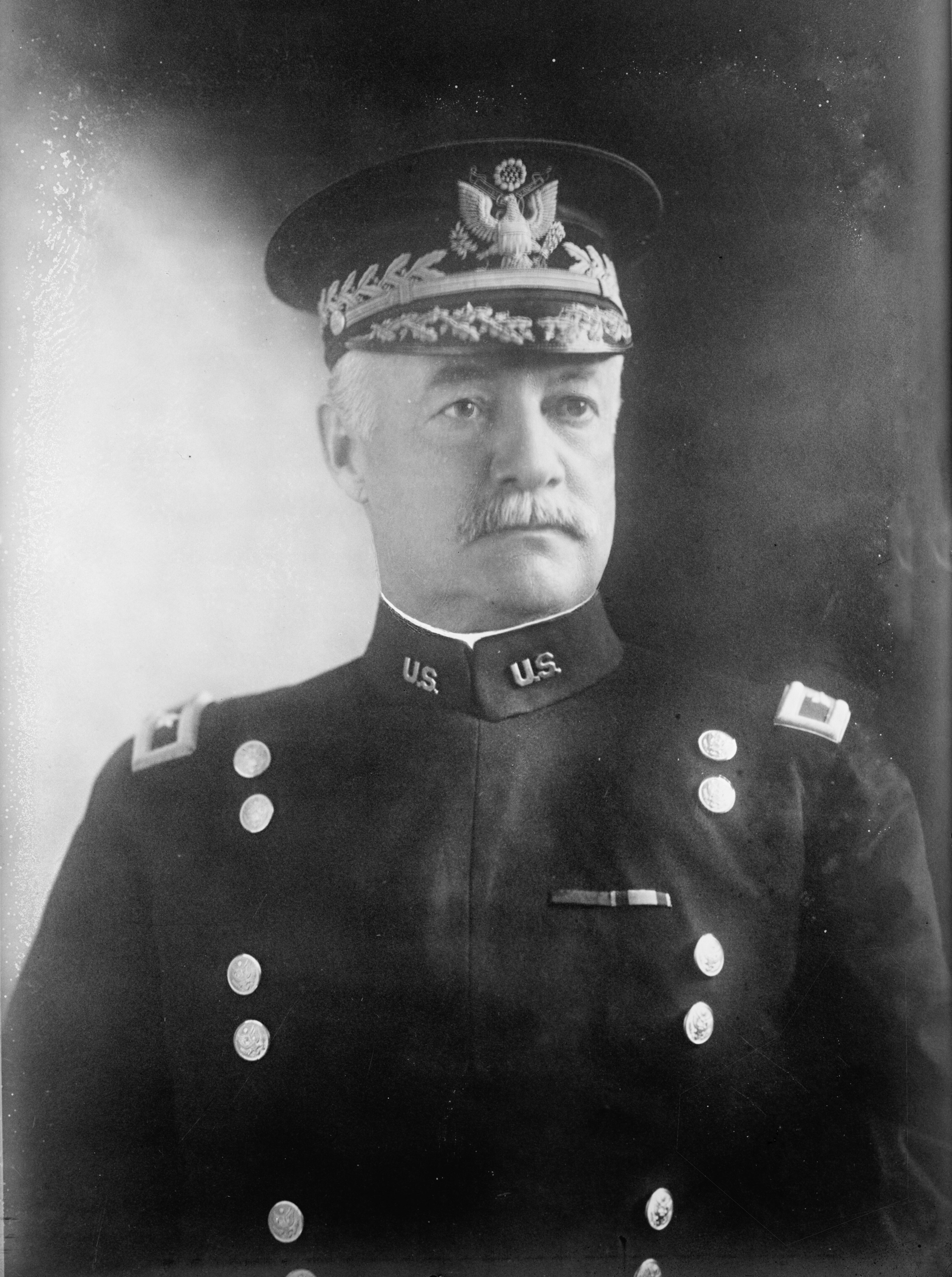
Hunter Liggett

In October 1917, Congress authorized the President to appoint as generals the chief of staff of the Army and the commander of the United States forces in France, and as lieutenant generals the commanders of the field armies and army corps, so that they would not be outranked by their counterparts in allied European armies. Unlike previous incarnations, these new grades were time-limited, authorized only for the duration of the World War I emergency, after which their bearers would revert to their lower permanent grades. The commander of the American Expeditionary Force, Major General John J. Pershing, was immediately appointed emergency general, as were two successive Army chiefs of staff, but no emergency lieutenant generals were named for over a year because the armies they would command had not yet been organized.

On October 21, 1918, Major Generals Hunter Liggett, commander of the First Army, and Robert L. Bullard, commander of the Second Army, were nominated to be emergency lieutenant generals, less than three weeks before the Armistice. With victory imminent, Secretary of War Newton D. Baker sought legislation to reward the Army's high commanders by making their emergency grades permanent. However, Army chief of staff Peyton C. March had alienated many members of Congress by unilaterally reorganizing the Army without their input and his enemies blocked every effort to honor any officer but Pershing with higher rank. In the end, Pershing was promoted to permanent General of the Armies, but March, Liggett, and Bullard reverted to their permanent grades of major general when their emergency grades expired on July 1, 1920.

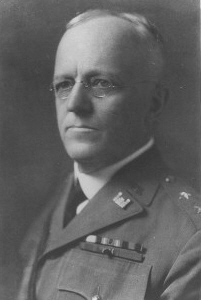
Edgar Jadwin

After the war, there were a number of unsuccessful attempts to retire as lieutenant generals a list of officers that variously included Major Generals March, Liggett, Bullard, Enoch H. Crowder, Joseph T. Dickman, Leonard Wood, John F. Morrison, James G. Harbord, James W. McAndrew, Henry P. McCain, Charles P. Summerall, Ernest Hinds, Harry F. Hodges, William Campbell Langfitt, and George W. Goethals; Surgeon General Merritte W. Ireland; and Colonel William L. Kenly. Finally, on August 7, 1929, the Army chief of engineers, Major General Edgar Jadwin, was retired as a lieutenant general by a 1915 law that automatically promoted officers one grade upon retirement if they had helped build the Panama Canal. There was some consternation that a peacetime staff corps officer had secured more or less by chance a promotion deliberately withheld from the victorious field commanders of World War I, so the year after Jadwin's promotion all World War I officers were advanced to their highest wartime ranks on the retired list, including Liggett and Bullard.

In 1942, Congress allowed retired Army generals to be advanced one grade on the retired list or posthumously if they had been recommended in writing during World War I for promotion to a higher rank which they had not since received, provided they had also been awarded the Medal of Honor, the Distinguished Service Cross, or the Distinguished Service Medal; retired Major Generals James G. Harbord and William M. Wright were both advanced to lieutenant general under this provision.

=== Interwar ===
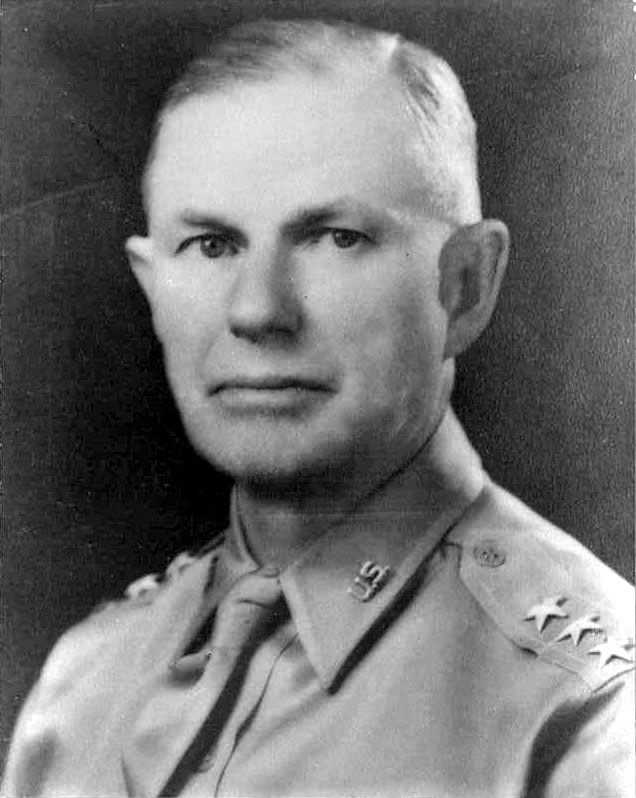
Walter C. Short

After Pershing retired in 1924, the rank of the Army chief of staff reverted to major general, the highest permanent grade in the peacetime Army. However, the Navy continued to maintain three ex officio vice admirals and four ex officio admirals, including the chief of naval operations, so in 1929 Congress raised the ex officio rank of the Army chief of staff to full general. In 1939 Congress also assigned the ex officio rank of lieutenant general to the major generals of the Regular Army specifically assigned to command each of the four field armies, allowing President Franklin D. Roosevelt to appoint the first new active-duty lieutenant generals since World War I: First Army commander Hugh A. Drum, Second Army commander Stanley H. Ford, Third Army commander Stanley D. Embick, and Fourth Army commander Albert J. Bowley. Congress extended similar rank in July 1940 to the major generals commanding the Panama Canal and Hawaiian Departments.

As general officers of the staff, these new lieutenant generals bore three-star rank only while actually commanding a field army or department, and reverted to their permanent two-star rank upon being reassigned or retired. However, during World War II most lieutenant generals of the staff received concurrent personal appointments as temporary lieutenant generals in the Army of the United States so that they could be reassigned without loss of rank. Postwar legislation allowed officers to retire in their highest temporary grades, so most lieutenant generals of the staff eventually retired at that rank. Of the lieutenant generals of the staff who were never appointed temporary lieutenant generals, Albert J. Bowley, Stanley H. Ford, Charles D. Herron, Daniel Van Voorhis, Herbert J. Brees, and Walter C. Short retired as major generals upon reaching the statutory retirement age; and Lloyd R. Fredendall qualified to retire in grade due to physical disability incurred during his term as lieutenant general. After the war, Brees and Short both applied to be advanced to lieutenant general on the retired list under a 1948 law; Brees was promoted but the administration specifically declined to advance Short, who had been relieved of command of the Hawaiian Department a few days after the defeat at Pearl Harbor.

=== World War II ===
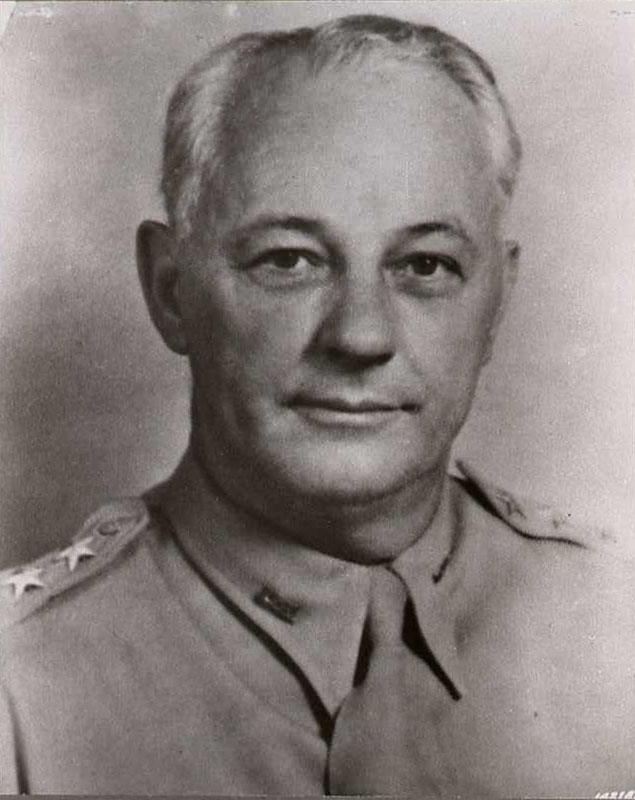
Delos C. Emmons

In September 1940, Congress authorized the President to appoint Regular Army officers to temporary higher grades in the Army of the United States during time of war or national emergency. The first temporary lieutenant general appointed under this authority was Major General Delos C. Emmons, Commander, General Headquarters Air Force; followed by Major General Lesley J. McNair, Chief of Staff, General Headquarters, U.S. Army. In July 1941, retired four-star general Douglas MacArthur was recalled to active duty and appointed temporary lieutenant general as Commanding General, U.S. Army Forces in the Far East.

Dozens of officers were promoted to temporary lieutenant general during World War II. Lieutenant generals typically commanded one of the numbered field armies or air forces; served as deputy theater commanders; or headed major headquarters staffs, administrative commands, or support organizations. Officers were only allowed to retire in their temporary grades if they were retired due to disability incurred in the line of duty, but those compelled by good health to retire in a lower grade were eventually restored to their highest wartime ranks on the retired list.

Subject to Senate approval, anyone could be appointed temporary lieutenant general, even a civilian. In January 1942, the outgoing Director General of the Office of Production Management, William S. Knudsen, was commissioned temporary lieutenant general in the Army of the United States, the only civilian ever to join the Army at such a high initial rank.

=== Postwar ===
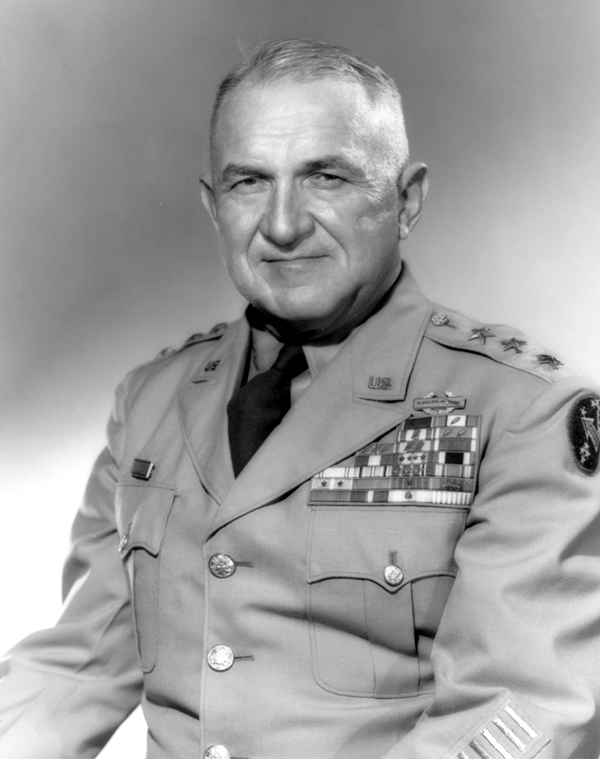
John W. O'Daniel

The modern office of lieutenant general was established by the Officer Personnel Act of 1947, which authorized the President to designate certain positions of importance and responsibility to carry the ex officio rank of general or lieutenant general, to be filled by officers holding the permanent or temporary grade of major general or higher. Officers could retire in their highest active-duty rank, subject to Senate approval. The total number of positions allowed to carry such rank was capped at 15 percent of the total number of general officers, which worked out initially to nine generals and thirty-five lieutenant generals, of whom four generals and seventeen lieutenant generals were required to be in the Air Corps. All Air Corps personnel were transferred in grade to the United States Air Force by the National Security Act of 1947.

Lieutenant generals typically headed divisions of the General Staff in Washington, D.C.; field armies in Europe, Japan, and the continental United States; the Army command in the Pacific; the unified command in the Caribbean; the occupation force in Austria; and senior educational institutions such as the National War College, the Army War College, and the Armed Forces Staff College. During the Korean War, the commanding general of the Eighth Army was elevated to full general, and the Eighth Army deputy commanding general and subordinate corps commanders were elevated to lieutenant general.

By mid-1952, the number of active-duty general officers had swelled to nearly twice its World War II peak. In response, Congress enacted the Officer Grade Limitation Act of 1954, which tied the maximum number of generals to the total number of officers. However, the real limit was the so-called Stennis ceiling imposed by Mississippi senator John C. Stennis, whose Senate Armed Services Committee refused to confirm general or flag officer nominations beyond what he considered to be a reasonable total, which typically was much lower than the statutory limit. The Stennis ceiling remained in effect from the mid-1950s until the post-Vietnam War drawdown.

Unlike the temporary general and flag officer ranks of World War II, the 1947 ranks were attached to offices, not individuals, and were lost if an officer was reassigned to a lesser job. Army generals almost always preferred to retire rather than revert to a lower permanent grade. A rare exception was Lt. Gen. John W. O'Daniel, who temporarily relinquished his third star upon becoming chief of the Military Assistance Advisory Group in French Indochina so that he would not outrank the theater commander in chief, French lieutenant general Henri Navarre. O'Daniel got his star back five months later when France withdrew from Indochina following Navarre's defeat at Dien Bien Phu.

== Legislative history ==
The following list of Congressional legislation includes all acts of Congress pertaining to appointments to the grade of lieutenant general in the United States Army before 1960.

Each entry lists an act of Congress, its citation in the United States Statutes at Large, and a summary of the act's relevance.

Legislation	Citation	Summary
Act of May 28, 1798	1 Stat. 558	Authorized one grade of lieutenant general (George Washington).
Act of March 3, 1799	1 Stat. 752	Terminated grade of lieutenant general upon the appointment of a "general of the armies of the United States."
Joint Resolution No. 9 of February 15, 1855	10 Stat. 723	Authorized grade of lieutenant general to be specially conferred once by brevet to acknowledge eminent services of a major general of the Army during the Mexican War (Winfield Scott).
Act of August 3, 1861	12 Stat. 287	Authorized the brevet lieutenant general to retire for disability at full pay.
Act of February 29, 1864	13 Stat. 11	Authorized one grade of lieutenant general (Ulysses S. Grant, William T. Sherman, Philip H. Sheridan).
Act of July 15, 1870	16 Stat. 318	Terminated grade of lieutenant general at next vacancy.
Act of June 1, 1888	25 Stat. 165	Terminated grade of lieutenant general and merged with grade of general (Philip H. Sheridan).
Joint Resolution No. 9 of February 5, 1895	28 Stat. 968	Authorized grade of lieutenant general to be specially conferred once to acknowledge distinguished services of a major general of the Army (John M. Schofield).
Act of June 6, 1900	31 Stat. 655	Assigned ex officio rank of lieutenant general to the senior major general of the line commanding the Army (Nelson A. Miles).
Act of February 2, 1901	31 Stat. 748	Authorized one grade of lieutenant general (Nelson A. Miles, Samuel B. M. Young, Adna R. Chaffee, Henry C. Corbin, John C. Bates, Arthur MacArthur Jr.).
Act of March 2, 1907	34 Stat. 1160	Terminated grade of lieutenant general at next vacancy, except on retired list.
Act of March 4, 1915	38 Stat. 1191	Authorized one-grade promotion upon retirement of any officer detailed for more than three years in Panama with the Isthmian Canal Commission, if not otherwise promoted by this Act (Edgar Jadwin).
Act of October 6, 1917	40 Stat. 410	Authorized emergency grade of lieutenant general for each commander of an army or army corps during the World War I emergency (Hunter Liggett, Robert L. Bullard).
Act of June 4, 1920	41 Stat. 760	Terminated all emergency grades.
Act of June 21, 1930	45 Stat. 793	Authorized promotion on the retired list to highest grade held during World War I (Hunter Liggett, Robert L. Bullard).
Act of August 5, 1939	53 Stat. 1214	Assigned ex officio rank of lieutenant general to major generals commanding the four armies of the United States.
Act of July 31, 1940	54 Stat. 781	Assigned ex officio rank of lieutenant general to major generals commanding the Panama Canal and Hawaiian Departments.
Act of September 22, 1941	55 Stat. 728	Authorized temporary general officer grades in the Army of the United States during the World War II emergency.
Act of July 9, 1942	56 Stat. 655	Authorized one-grade promotion on the retired list or posthumously of general officers who, for services rendered during World War I, were recommended in writing for promotion to increased rank not since received, and who also received the Medal of Honor, Distinguished Service Cross, or Distinguished Service Medal (James G. Harbord, William M. Wright).
Act of June 29, 1943	57 Stat. 149	Authorized officers retired for physical disability incurred while temporarily appointed to a higher grade to retire in that grade (Hugh A. Drum, Jonathan M. Wainwright IV, Robert C. Richardson Jr., Lloyd R. Fredendall, Barton K. Yount, George Grunert, William H. Simpson, Richard K. Sutherland, John C. H. Lee, Barney M. Giles, Lucian K. Truscott Jr., Edmund B. Gregory, Oscar W. Griswold).; Authorized officers retired for reasons other than physical disability who subsequently incurred physical disability while temporarily appointed to a higher grade to be promoted on the retired list to that grade (Stanley D. Embick, Ben Lear, Walter Krueger).
Act of July 26, 1947 [National Security Act of 1947]	61 Stat. 503	Established U.S. Air Force.; Transferred to U.S. Air Force all personnel in Army Air Forces, Air Corps, and General Headquarters Air Force.
Act of August 7, 1947 [Officer Personnel Act of 1947]	61 Stat. 886	Assigned ex officio rank of lieutenant general to general officers serving in positions designated by the President to carry that rank.; Assigned ex officio rank of lieutenant general to senior members of the Military and Naval Staff Committee of the United Nations.; Capped total positions with ex officio ranks above major general at 15 percent of the total number of active-duty general officers.; Capped total officers above grade of major general at 44, of whom not more than nine to be above grade of lieutenant general.; Capped total officers above grade of major general at 17 in the Air Corps and 27 not in the Air Corps.; Exempted from caps general officers serving as Chief of Staff to the President or specifically authorized by act of Congress to hold appointments to diplomatic or civil offices.; Authorized retirement in highest rank held on active duty.; Authorized promotion to general or lieutenant general on the retired list of Regular Army officers who served in those grades between December 7, 1941, and June 30, 1946 (John L. DeWitt, Brehon B. Somervell, Wilhelm D. Styer, Eugene Reybold, Levin H. Campbell Jr., Troy H. Middleton).
Act of June 24, 1948 [Private Law 80-394-A]	62 Stat. 1393	Authorized promotion of Leslie R. Groves to lieutenant general on the retired list, with retired pay of a major general and honorary date of rank as lieutenant general from July 16, 1945.
Act of June 29, 1948 [Army and Air Force Vitalization and Retirement Equalization Act of 1948]	62 Stat. 1085	Authorized promotion on the retired list of Regular Army and Regular Air Force officers to the highest temporary grades in which they served satisfactorily for at least six months between September 6, 1940, and June 30, 1946 (Herbert J. Brees, George H. Brett, Ira C. Eaker, Harold L. George).
Act of October 12, 1949 [Career Compensation Act of 1949]	63 Stat. 806	Established pay grade O-8 for general, lieutenant general, and major general.
Joint Resolution of January 2, 1951 [Private Law 81-1083]	64 Stat. A271	Authorized posthumous promotion of Walton H. Walker to general.
Act of May 5, 1954 [Officer Grade Limitation Act of 1954]	68 Stat. 65	Capped total number of general officers as a function of total commissioned officer strength.; Capped total officers above grade of brigadier general at 50 percent of all general officers.
Act of July 19, 1954	68 Stat. 492	Authorized promotion to general on the retired list or posthumously of any officer who, while a lieutenant general, was: commanding general of Army Ground Forces between March 8, 1942, and August 16, 1945 (Lesley J. McNair, Ben Lear); in command of a field army in the European-African-Middle Eastern Theater of Operations between December 11, 1941, and May 8, 1945 (Lucian K. Truscott Jr., Leonard T. Gerow, William H. Simpson, Alexander M. Patch); in command of a field army in the Asiatic-Pacific Theater of Operations between December 8, 1941, and August 16, 1945 (Robert L. Eichelberger, Simon B. Buckner Jr.); in command of Army forces including one or more field armies and supporting units in either theater between March 8, 1942, and August 16, 1945 (Robert C. Richardson Jr.); commanding general of United States forces in China and chief of staff to Generalissimo Chiang Kai-shek in the China Theater of Operations between March 8, 1942, and August 16, 1945 (Albert C. Wedemeyer); or in command of Western Defense Command between December 5, 1939, and June 14, 1943 (John L. DeWitt).
Act of August 7, 1956 [Private Law 84-892]	70 Stat. A201	Authorized promotion of Hanford MacNider to lieutenant general on the retired list.
Act of May 20, 1958	72 Stat. 124	Established pay grade O-9 for lieutenant general.

== See also ==
- Lieutenant general (United States)
- General officers in the United States
- List of American Civil War generals
- List of United States Army four-star generals
- List of lieutenant generals in the United States Air Force before 1960
- List of major generals in the United States Regular Army before July 1, 1920
- List of brigadier generals in the United States Regular Army before February 2, 1901
- List of United States Navy vice admirals on active duty before 1960
- List of United States Marine Corps lieutenant generals on active duty before 1960

== Bibliography ==
=== Biographical registers ===
- War Department (1907), Official Army Register, Washington, D.C.: Government Printing Office
- War Department (1922), Official Army Register, Washington, D.C.: Government Printing Office – via archive.org
- War Department (1931), Official Army Register, Washington, D.C.: Government Printing Office – via archive.org
- War Department (1940), Official Army Register, Washington, D.C.: Government Printing Office – via archive.org
- War Department (1941), Official Army Register, Washington, D.C.: Government Printing Office – via archive.org
- War Department (1942), Official Army Register, Washington, D.C.: Government Printing Office – via archive.org
- War Department (1943), Official Army Register, Washington, D.C.: Government Printing Office – via archive.org
- War Department (1944), Official Army Register, Washington, D.C.: Government Printing Office – via archive.org
- War Department (1945), Official Army Register, Washington, D.C.: Government Printing Office – via archive.org
- War Department (1946), Official Army Register, Washington, D.C.: Government Printing Office – via archive.org
- War Department (1947), Official Army Register, Washington, D.C.: Government Printing Office – via archive.org
- Department of the Army (1948), Official Army and Air Force Register, vol. A–Q, Washington, D.C.: Government Printing Office
- Department of the Army (1948), Official Army and Air Force Register, vol. R–Z, Washington, D.C.: Government Printing Office
- Department of the Army (1949), Official Army Register, Washington, D.C.: Government Printing Office – via archive.org
- Department of the Army (1950), Official Army Register, Washington, D.C.: Government Printing Office – via archive.org
- Department of the Army (1951), Official Army Register, Washington, D.C.: Government Printing Office – via archive.org
- Department of the Army (1952), Official Army Register, Washington, D.C.: Government Printing Office – via archive.org
- Department of the Army (1953), Official Army Register, Washington, D.C.: Government Printing Office – via archive.org
- Department of the Army (1954), Official Army Register, Washington, D.C.: Government Printing Office – via archive.org
- Department of the Army (1955), Official Army Register, Washington, D.C.: Government Printing Office – via archive.org
- Department of the Army (1956), Official Army Register, Washington, D.C.: Government Printing Office – via archive.org
- Department of the Army (1957), Official Army Register, Washington, D.C.: Government Printing Office – via archive.org
- Department of the Army (1958), Official Army Register, Washington, D.C.: Government Printing Office – via archive.org
- Department of the Army (1959), Official Army Register, Washington, D.C.: Government Printing Office – via archive.org
- Department of the Army (1960), Official Army Register, Washington, D.C.: Government Printing Office – via archive.org
- Department of the Army (1961), Official Army Register, Washington, D.C.: Government Printing Office – via archive.org
- Department of the Army (1962), Official Army Register, Washington, D.C.: Government Printing Office – via archive.org
- Department of the Army (1963), Official Army Register, Washington, D.C.: Government Printing Office – via archive.org
- Department of the Army (1964), Official Army Register, Washington, D.C.: Government Printing Office – via archive.org
- Department of the Army (1965), Official Army Register, Washington, D.C.: Government Printing Office – via archive.org
- Department of the Army (1966), Official Army Register, Washington, D.C.: Government Printing Office – via archive.org
- Department of the Army (1967), Official Army Register, Washington, D.C.: Government Printing Office – via archive.org
- Department of the Army (1968), Official Army Register, Washington, D.C.: Government Printing Office – via archive.org
- Department of the Army (1969), Official Army Register, Washington, D.C.: Government Printing Office – via archive.org
- Ancell, R. Manning; Miller, Christine M. (1996), The Biographical Dictionary of World War II Generals and Flag Officers: The U.S. Armed Forces, Westport, Connecticut: Greenwood Press
- Bell, William Gardner (2005), Commanding Generals and Chiefs Of Staff, 1775–2005: Portraits & Biographical Sketches of the United States Army's Senior Officer, Washington, D.C.: Government Printing Office, archived from the original on 2021-04-10
- Eicher, John H.; Eicher, David J. (1999), Civil War High Commands, Stanford, California: Stanford University Press
- Heitman, Francis B. (1903), Historical Register and Dictionary of the United States Army: From Its Organization, September 29, 1789, To March 2, 1903, vol. I, Washington, D.C.: Government Printing Office
- McHenry, Robert (1978), Webster's American Military Biographies, Springfield, Massachusetts: G. & C. Merriam Co.
- Who Was Who in American History — The Military, Chicago, Illinois: Marquis Who's Who, Inc., 1975
- Young, Gordon R. (1959), The Army Almanac, Harrisburg, Pennsylvania: The Stackpole Company

=== Other publications ===
- Anderson, Charles R. (2004), Day of Lightning, Years of Scorn: Walter C. Short and the Attack on Pearl Harbor, Annapolis, Maryland: Naval Institute Press, ISBN 9781591140115
- Callan, John F. (1863), The Military Laws of the United States, relating to the Army, Volunteers, Militia, And To Bounty Lands And Pensions, From the Foundation of the Government to the Year 1863, Philadelphia, Pennsylvania: George W. Childs
- Cline, Ray S. (1951), Washington Command Post: The Operations Division, United States Army in World War II, Washington, D.C.: United States Army Center of Military History
- Coffman, Edward M. (1966), The Hilt of the Sword: The Career of Peyton C. March, Madison, Wisconsin: University of Wisconsin Press
- Conn, Stetson; Engelman, Rose C.; Fairchild, Byron (1964), Guarding the United States and its Outposts, Washington, D.C.: United States Army Center of Military History, archived from the original on 2007-12-25
- Connelly, Donald B. (2006), John M. Schofield & the Politics of Generalship, Chapel Hill, North Carolina: University of North Carolina Press
- Dorn, Edwin (1995), Memorandum for the Deputy Secretary of Defense: Advancement of Rear Admiral Kimmel and Major General Short on the Retired List, Washington, D.C.: Office of the Under Secretary of Defense for Personnel and Readiness
- Eckhardt, George S. (1974), Command and Control: 1950–1969, Vietnam Studies, Washington, D.C.: United States Army Center of Military History, archived from the original on 2017-10-19
- Fry, James B. (1877), The History and Legal Effect of Brevets in the Armies of Great Britain and the United States from Their Origin in 1692 to the Present Time, New York City, New York: D. Van Nostrand
- Hewes, James E. Jr. (1975), From Root to McNamara: Army Organization and Administration, Special Studies, Washington, D.C.: United States Army Center of Military History, archived from the original on December 14, 2007
- Millett, Allan R. (1975), The General: Robert L. Bullard and Officership in the United States Army, 1881–1925, Westport, Connecticut: Greenwood Press
- Mylander, Maureen (1974), The Generals: Making It, Military Style, New York City, New York: The Dial Press
- Office of the Judge Advocate General of the Army (1917), Military Laws of the United States, 1915, Washington, D.C.: Government Printing Office
- Office of the Judge Advocate General of the Army (1940), Military Laws of the United States, 1939, Washington, D.C.: Government Printing Office
- Wiener, Frederick B. (June 1945), "Three Stars and Up: Part One", Infantry Journal, LVI: 51–54
- Wiener, Frederick B. (July 1945), "Three Stars and Up: Part Two", Infantry Journal, LVII: 33–37
- Wiener, Frederick B. (September 1945), "Three Stars and Up: Part Three", Infantry Journal, LVII: 37–40
- Wiener, Frederick B. (October 1945), "Three Stars and Up: Part Four", Infantry Journal, LVII: 41–45
- Wiener, Frederick B. (November 1945), "Three Stars and Up: Part Five", Infantry Journal, LVII: 51–55
- Young, Kenneth Ray (1994), The General's General: The Life and Times of Arthur MacArthur, Boulder, Colorado: Westview Press
