= General Lawton =

General Lawton may refer to:

- Alexander Lawton (1818–1896), Confederate States Army brigadier general
- Henry Ware Lawton (1843–1899), U.S. Army major general
- William Stevens Lawton (1900–1993), U.S. Army lieutenant general
