= Frederick Wiener =

Frederick Wiener may refer to:

- Fredd Wayne (born Frederick Searle Wiener, 1924–2018), American actor
- Frederick Bernays Wiener (1906–1996), American jurist
