= List of commanders of I Corps (United States) =

Shoulder sleeve insignia of US I Corps.

This is a list of commanding officers of US I Corps in its operational history.

== Commanding officers ==
Image	Name	Rank	Years of Service	Details
	Hunter Liggett	Major General	20 January 1918 – 11 October 1918	First commander of I Corps.
	Joseph T. Dickman	Major General	12 October 1918 – 12 November 1918	
	William M. Wright	Major General	13 November 1918 – 24 March 1919	I Corps demobilized on 25 March 1919.
	Walter C. Short	Major General	11 January 1940 – 1 January 1941	
	Charles F. Thompson	Major General	2 January 1941 – 5 July 1942	
	Robert L. Eichelberger	Lieutenant General	6 July 1942 – 19 August 1944	
	Innis P. Swift	Major General	20 August 1944 – 14 November 1945	
	Roscoe B. Woodruff	Major General	14 November 1945 – 5 February 1946; 3 April 1946 – 1 February 1948	
	Joseph M. Swing	Major General	2 February 1948 – 27 January 1949	
	John B. Coulter	Lieutenant General	15 February 1949 – 19 March 1950	
	William B. Kean	Lieutenant General	29 March 1950 – 1 August 1950	
	John B. Coulter	Lieutenant General	2 August 1950 – 10 September 1950	
	Frank W. Milburn	Lieutenant General	11 September 1950 – 18 July 1951	
	John W. O'Daniel	Lieutenant General	19 July 1951 – 28 June 1952	
	Paul W. Kendall	Lieutenant General	29 June 1952 – 9 April 1953	
	Bruce C. Clarke	Lieutenant General	10 April 1953 – 13 October 1953	
	Halley G. Maddox	Major General	14 October 1953 – 28 October 1953	
	Blackshear M. Bryan	Lieutenant General	29 October 1953 – 12 July 1954	
	John H. Collier	Lieutenant General	13 July 1954 – 25 June 1955	
	Robert M. Montague	Lieutenant General	26 June 1955 – 14 October 1956	
	Arthur G. Trudeau	Lieutenant General	16 October 1956 – 3 February 1958	
	Thomas J. H. Trapnell	Lieutenant General	4 February 1958 – 14 August 1959	
	Harry P. Storke	Lieutenant General	15 August 1959 – 16 July 1960	
	John L. Ryan Jr.	Lieutenant General	17 July 1960 – 15 August 1961	
	Harvey H. Fischer	Lieutenant General	16 August 1961 – 19 August 1962	
	Hugh P. Harris	Lieutenant General	6 November 1962 – 2 December 1963	
	Theodore J. Conway	Lieutenant General	3 December 1963 – 10 December 1963	
	Thomas W. Dunn	Lieutenant General	11 December 1963 – 18 December 1964	
	Theodore J. Conway	Lieutenant General	19 December 1964 – 14 February 1965	
	Edgar C. Doleman	Lieutenant General	14 February 1965 – 15 July 1965	
	John A. Heintges	Lieutenant General	1 August 1965 – 5 November 1965	
	Charles W. G. Rich	Lieutenant General	16–31 July 1965; 7–30 November 1965	
	Andrew J. Boyle	Lieutenant General	1 December 1965 – 30 May 1967	
	Harry H. Critz	Lieutenant General	1 June 1967 – 14 July 1968	
	William P. Yarborough	Lieutenant General	15 July 1968 – 6 August 1969	
	Patrick F. Cassidy	Lieutenant General	8 August 1969 – 26 July 1970	
	Edward L. Rowny	Lieutenant General	27 July 1970 – 4 July 1971	
	Glenn D. Walker	Lieutenant General	12 July 1971 – 31 July 1972	
	Richard T. Knowles	Lieutenant General	1 August 1972 – 17 July 1973	
	James F. Hollingsworth	Lieutenant General	18 July 1973 – 11 February 1976	
	John H. Cushman	Lieutenant General	12 February 1976 – 9 February 1978	
	M. Collier Ross	Lieutenant General	27 February 1978 – 12 December 1979	
	Eugene P. Forrester	Lieutenant General	14 December 1979 – 13 March 1980	
	John N. Brandenburg	Lieutenant General	1 October 1981 – 31 May 1984	
	Joseph T. Palastra	Lieutenant General	3 July 1984 – 9 June 1986	
	H. Norman Schwarzkopf	Lieutenant General	10 June 1986 – 26 July 1987	
	William Hardin Harrison	Lieutenant General	27 July 1987 – 2 August 1989	
	Calvin A. H. Waller	Lieutenant General	3 August 1989 – 14 November 1990	
	Thomas H. Tait	Major General	14 November 1990 – 25 March 1991	
	Calvin A. H. Waller	Lieutenant General	25 March 1991 – 20 September 1991	
	Paul R. Schwartz	Major General	20 September 1991 – 17 October 1991	
	Columbus M. Womble	Brigadier General	17 October 1991 – 15 November 1991	
	Carmen J. Cavezza	Lieutenant General	15 November 1991 – 8 July 1994	
	William M. Matz, Jr.	Major General	8 July - 3 August 1994	
	Caryl Glenn (C.G.) Marsh	Lieutenant General	3 August 1994 – 6 December 1996	
	George A. Crocker	Lieutenant General	6 December 1996 – 30 September 1999	
	James T. Hill	Lieutenant General	30 September 1999 – 12 August 2002	
	Edward Soriano	Lieutenant General	12 August 2002 – 3 November 2004	
	James M. Dubik	Lieutenant General	3 November 2004 – 30 April 2007	
	William J. Troy	Brigadier General	30 April 2007 – 15 June 2007	
	Charles H. Jacoby Jr.	Lieutenant General	16 June 2007 – 10 March 2009	
	Jeff W. Mathis III	Brigadier General	11 March 2009 – 16 March 2010	
	Charles H. Jacoby Jr.	Lieutenant General	17 March – 8 June 2010	
	John D. Johnson	Major General	9 June - 14 October 2010	
	Curtis M. Scaparrotti	Lieutenant General	15 October 2010 – 3 July 2012	
	Robert B. Brown	Lieutenant General	3 July 2012 – 6 February 2014	
	Stephen R. Lanza	Lieutenant General	6 February 2014 – 3 April 2017	
	Gary J. Volesky	Lieutenant General	3 April 2017 – 4 February 2020	
	Randy A. George	Lieutenant General	4 February 2020 – 2 June 2021	
	Xavier T. Brunson	Lieutenant General	Acting: 2 June 2021 – 6 October 2021; 6 October 2021 – 25 October 2024	
	Matthew W. McFarlane	Lieutenant General	25 October 2024 – present	
