= List of commanders of V Corps (United States) =

The following general officers have served as commander of V Corps since 1918:

== List of V Corps commanding generals ==
No.	Commander		Term		
No.	Portrait	Name	Took office	Left office	Term length
1	William Wright	Major General; William Wright (1863–1943)	12 July 1918	20 August 1918	39 days
2	George H. Cameron	Major General; George H. Cameron (1861–1944)	21 August 1918	11 October 1918	51 days
3	Charles P. Summerall	Major General; Charles P. Summerall (1867–1955)	12 October 1918	2 May 1919	202 days
4	George Read	Major General; George Read (1860–1934)	3 October 1922	29 June 1986	3 years, 153 days
5	William Cole	Major General; William Cole (1874–1953)	25 January 1936	30 September 1938	2 years, 248 days
6	David L. Stone	Major General; David L. Stone (1876–1959)	22 January 1940	25 April 1940	94 days
7	Campbell B. Hodges	Brigadier General; Campbell B. Hodges (1881–1944)	1 June 1940	18 October 1940	94 days
8	Edmund L. Daley	Major General; Edmund L. Daley (1883–1968)	17 March 1941	19 January 1942	308 days
9	William S. Key	Major General; William S. Key (1889–1959)	10 January 1942	19 May 1942	129 days
10	Russell P. Hartle	Major General; Russell P. Hartle (1889–1961)	20 May 1942	14 July 1943	1 year, 55 days
11	Leonard T. Gerow	Major General; Leonard T. Gerow (1888–1972)	15 July 1943	17 September 1944	1 year, 64 days
12	Edward H. Brooks	Major General; Edward H. Brooks (1893–1978)	18 September 1944	4 October 1944	16 days
13	Leonard T. Gerow	Major General; Leonard T. Gerow (1888–1972)	5 October 1944	14 January 1945	101 days
14	Clarence R. Huebner	Major General; Clarence R. Huebner (1888–1972)	15 January 1945	11 November 1945	300 days
15	Frank W. Milburn	Major General; Frank W. Milburn (1892–1962)	12 November 1945	29 April 2011	206 days
14	Orlando Ward	Major General; Orlando Ward (1881–1972)	7 June 1946	15 November 1946	161 days
15	Stafford L. Irwin	Major General; Stafford L. Irwin (1883–1955)	16 November 1946	31 October 1948	1 year, 350 days
16	John R. Hodge	Lieutenant General; John R. Hodge (1893–1963)	1 November 1948	31 August 1950	1 year, 303 days
17	John W. Leonard	Lieutenant general John W. Leonard (1890–1974)	1 September 1950	18 June 1951	290 days
18	Boniface Campbell	Brigadier General; Boniface Campbell (1895–1988)	19 June 1951	1 August 1951	43 days
19	John E. Dahlquist	Major General; John E. Dahlquist (1896–1975)	2 August 1951	1 October 2025	1 year, 214 days
20	Ira P. Swift	Major General; Ira P. Swift (1898–1987)	5 March 1953	17 June 1954	1 year, 104 days
21	Charles E. Hart	Lieutenant General; Charles E. Hart (1900–1991)	18 June 1954	28 March 1956	1 year, 284 days
22	Lemuel Mathewson	Lieutenant General; Lemuel Mathewson (1899–1970)	29 March 1956	16 August 1957	1 year, 140 days
23	Francis William Farrell	Lieutenant General; Francis William Farrell (1900–1981)	17 August 1957	31 March 1959	1 year, 226 days
24	Paul D. Adams	Lieutenant General; Paul D. Adams (1906–1987)	1 April 1959	30 September 1960	1 year, 182 days
25	Frederic J. Brown II	Lieutenant General; Frederic J. Brown II (1905–1971)	1 October 1960	28 August 1961	331 days
26	John K. Waters	Lieutenant General; John K. Waters (1906–1989)	29 August 1961	14 May 1962	258 days
27	John H. Michaelis	Lieutenant General; John H. Michaelis (1912–1985)	15 May 1962	14 July 1963	1 year, 60 days
28	Creighton Abrams	Lieutenant General; Creighton Abrams (1914–1974)	15 July 1963	3 August 1964	1 year, 19 days
29	James H. Polk	Lieutenant General; James H. Polk (1911–1992)	1 September 1964	27 February 1966	258 days
30	George R. Mather	Lieutenant General; George R. Mather (1911–1993)	28 February 1966	31 May 1967	258 days
26	Andrew J. Boyle	Lieutenant General; Andrew J. Boyle (1911–2001)	1 July 1967	31 July 1969	2 years, 30 days
26	Claire E. Hutchin Jr.	Lieutenant General; Claire E. Hutchin Jr. (1910–1980)	15 September 1969	23 January 1971	1 year, 130 days
27	Willard Pearson	Lieutenant General; Willard Pearson (1915–1996)	14 February 1971	31 May 1973	2 years, 106 days
28	William R. Desobry	Lieutenant General; William R. Desobry (1918–1996)	1 June 1973	24 August 1975	2 years, 84 days
29	Robert Leahy Fair	Lieutenant General; Robert Leahy Fair (1923–1983)	25 August 1975	4 January 1976	132 days
30	Donn A. Starry	Lieutenant General; Donn A. Starry (1925–2011)	16 February 1976	17 June 1977	1 year, 121 days
31	Sidney Bryan Berry	Lieutenant General; Sidney Bryan Berry (1926–2013)	19 July 1977	February 1980	2 years, 223 days
32	Willard Warren Scott Jr.	Lieutenant General; Willard Warren Scott Jr. (1926–2009)	February 1980	15 July 1981	2 years, 319 days
33	Paul S. Williams Jr.	Lieutenant General; Paul S. Williams Jr. (1929–1995)	16 July 1981	29 May 1984	2 years, 318 days
34	Robert Lewis Wetzel	Lieutenant General; Robert Lewis Wetzel (1930–2022)	29 May 1984	23 June 1986	2 years, 25 days
35	Colin Powell	Lieutenant General; Colin Powell (1937–2021)	23 June 1986	1 January 1987	192 days
36	Lincoln Jones	Major General; Lincoln Jones (1933–2013)	1 January 1987	23 March 1987	81 days
37	John W. Woodmansee	Lieutenant General; John W. Woodmansee (born 1934)	23 March 1987	29 May 1984	2 years, 120 days
38	George Joulwan	Lieutenant General; George Joulwan (born 1939)	7 August 1989	9 November 1990	1 year, 94 days
39	David M. Maddox	Lieutenant General; David M. Maddox (1938–2026)	9 November 1990	17 June 1992	1 year, 221 days
40	Jerry R. Rutherford	Lieutenant General; Jerry R. Rutherford	17 June 1992	6 April 1995	2 years, 293 days
41	John N. Abrams	Lieutenant General; John N. Abrams (1946–2018)	6 April 1995	31 July 1997	2 years, 116 days
42	John W. Hendrix	Lieutenant General; John W. Hendrix (born 1942)	31 July 1997	November 1999	2 years, 108 days
43	James C. Riley	Lieutenant General; James C. Riley (born 1946)	16 November 1999	18 July 2001	1 year, 244 days
44	William S. Wallace	Lieutenant General; William S. Wallace (born 1946)	18 July 2001	14 June 2003	1 year, 331 days
45	Ricardo Sanchez	Lieutenant General; Ricardo Sanchez (born 1953)	14 June 2003	6 September 2006	3 years, 84 days
46	Fred D. Robinson Jr.	Major General; Fred D. Robinson Jr.	6 September 2006	19 January 2007	135 days
47	James D. Thurman	Lieutenant General; James D. Thurman (born 1953)	19 January 2007	8 August 2007	201 days
48	Kenneth W. Hunzeker	Lieutenant General; Kenneth W. Hunzeker (born 1952)	8 August 2007	31 July 2009	1 year, 357 days
49	Michael A. Ryan	Brigadier General; Michael A. Ryan	8 August 2009	18 July 2001	1 year, 87 days
50	Allen Batschelet	Brigadier General; Allen Batschelet	3 November 2010	June 2011	
51	Ricky D. Gibbs	Brigadier General; Ricky D. Gibbs (born 1960)	June 2011	10 January 2012	
52	James L. Terry	Lieutenant General; James L. Terry (born 1957)	10 January 2012	15 September 2013	1 year, 248 days
53	John S. Kolasheski	Lieutenant General; John S. Kolasheski (born 1961)	4 August 2020	8 April 2024	3 years, 248 days
54	Charles Costanza	Lieutenant General; Charles Costanza (born 1969)	8 April 2024	8 August 2026	2 years, 122 days
-	Thomas M. Feltey	Major General; Thomas M. Feltey; Acting	8 August 2026		

== Sources ==
United States. Dept. of Army. Headquarters, V Corps. "It Will Be Done!" U.S. Army V Corps, 1918–2009: a pictorial history. Harold E. Raugh, Jr., Ed. Grafenwoehr, Germany: Druckerei Hutzler, 2009.
