= William Stevens Lawton =

United States Army general (1900-1993)

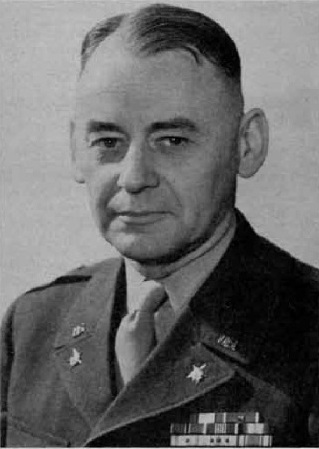
- Brigadier General Lawton in 1947 as Commandant of the Seacoast Branch of the Field Artillery School
- Born: 16 May 1900; Newport, Rhode Island, US
- Died: 26 February 1993 (aged 92); Fort Belvoir, Virginia, US
- Military career
- Allegiance: United States
- Branch: United States Army
- Service years: 1922–1960
- Rank: Lieutenant General
- Service number: 0-14924
- Commands: Seacoast Branch, U.S. Army Field Artillery School; Korean Communications Zone; US Army Comptroller
- Conflicts: World War II; Korean War
- Awards: Distinguished Service Medal; Legion of Merit; Bronze Star Medal
- Other work: Vice President, Government Loan Services Savings and Loan Association Inc.

William Stevens Lawton (16 May 1900 – 26 February 1993) was a lieutenant general in the United States Army and served as the Army's Comptroller.

== Early life ==
Lawton was born on 16 May 1900, in Newport, Rhode Island, and graduated from Newport's Rogers High School in 1917.

From 1917 to 1918, Lawton attended Worcester Polytechnic Institute. He then transferred to the United States Military Academy, graduating in 1922.

== Start of military career ==
In 1923, Lawton graduated from both the Army's Primary Flying School and its Advanced Flying School Special Observation Course.

After completing his aviator qualification, Lawton was assigned to Coastal Artillery Corps postings, including Fort Adams, Rhode Island.

Lawton graduated from the Artillery School Battery Officer Course in 1930. He then carried out Coastal Artillery postings throughout the US and overseas, including the 61st Coast Artillery Battalion at Fort Sheridan, Illinois, assignment to the Philippines, and a tour of duty at Fort Winfield Scott.

In 1939, Lawton graduated from both the Chemical Warfare Field Officer Course and the Command and General Staff College.

== World War II ==
From 1941 to 1943, Lawton was Assistant Deputy Chief of Staff of the Army's Hawaiian Department. He was present at the attack on Pearl Harbor and later gave Congressional testimony about his experience and observations.

Lawton was Deputy Chief of Staff US Army Forces Mid-Pacific, with duty in Hawaii from 1943 to 1946.

== Post-World War II ==
In 1947, Lawton was appointed Assistant Commandant of the Army's Field Artillery School and Commandant of the school's Seacoast Branch.

From 1950 to 1951, Lawton served as Chief of Staff of Army Field Forces, with duty at Fort Monroe, Virginia.

In 1952, Lawton was assigned as Deputy Chief of Staff for Civil Relations at the US Far East Command, serving until 1953.

== Korean War ==
Lawton was appointed to command the Korean Communication Zone in 1953, and served in this position until 1954. In this high-profile rear echelon command, Lawton took steps to improve the perception of the US military among South Korean civilians by implementing Operation Good Will, a successful effort to generate from members of the US military and American civilians contributions of money and other needed items for orphanages, schools and other institutions.

== Post-Korean War ==
In 1955, Lawton was assigned as Director of the Budget Division in the Army's Office of the Comptroller.

Lawton was named Comptroller of the Army in 1957, serving until his retirement from the military.

From 1958 to 1959, he served as President of the Association of Military Comptrollers.

General Lawton retired in 1960.

== Awards and decorations ==
His awards and decorations included multiple awards of the Distinguished Service Medal and the Legion of Merit, as well as the Bronze Star Medal.

In 1973, General Lawton was inducted into the Lambda Chi Alpha fraternity's Order of Achievement.

== Subsequent career ==
After leaving the Army, Lawton resided in Bethesda, Maryland. He accepted a position as vice president and Vice Chairman of the Board for Government Loan Services Savings and Loan Association, Inc., where he remained until retiring in the 1980s. In 1989 Lawton moved to the Fairfax retirement community at Fort Belvoir, Virginia, where he died 26 February 1993.

== See also ==
- List of lieutenant generals in the United States Army before 1960
