= Frederick Bernays Wiener =

American lawyer

- Born: June 1, 1906; New York, New York
- Died: October 1, 1996 (aged 90); Phoenix, Arizona
- Occupation: Appellate Lawyer
- Citizenship: United States
- Education: Ph.B., LL.B.
- Alma mater: Brown University, Harvard Law School
- Period: 1940-1978
- Subject: Military justice, appellate practice
- Spouse: Esther Helen Green (1933-1948), Doris Merchant (1949–1996)
- Relatives: Sigmund Freud (grand-nephew)

Frederick Bernays "Fritz" Wiener (June 1, 1906 – October 1, 1996) was an American jurist specializing in military justice and constitutional law who became famous for the 1957 case of Reid v. Covert, which represents the only time a lawyer lost in the Supreme Court of the United States but prevailed on rehearing. That case was particularly notable in that it established that "no agreement with a foreign nation [i.e., no treaty] can confer power on the Congress, or on any other branch of Government, which is free from the restraints of the Constitution."

He is also noted for arguing for the victorious appellants in the racial discrimination case Moose Lodge No. 107 v. Irvis, 407 U.S. 163 (1972), and the losing appellant in the reapportionment case Roman v. Sincock, 377 U.S. 695 (1964). "

== Education and career ==
Wiener graduated summa cum laude from Brown University in 1927, and magna cum laude from Harvard Law School, where he was note editor for the Harvard Law Review, in 1930. He was admitted to the bar of Rhode Island the next year, and the Supreme Court bar in 1934.

During World War II, he served in the Judge Advocate General's Corps, retiring from the United States Army in 1966 with the rank of colonel. Working for the Solicitor General's Office and later in private practice, he often argued before the U.S. Supreme Court.

From 1951 to 1956, he lectured in law at George Washington University, while also lecturing before foreign and domestic groups. In 1962 he was awarded a Guggenheim Fellowship. He retired from active practice in 1973 while continuing occasional consultations. In 1974, he was awarded the U.S. Army's Outstanding Civilian Service Medal.

Wiener was called no less than seven times to testify before Congress on matters pertaining to military law. On 6 August 1984, he testified before the United States Senate Governmental Affairs Subcommittee on Civil Service, Post Office and General Services, chaired by Senator Ted Stevens, against the passage of Senate Bill 2116, a bill which, based on the findings of the Commission on Wartime Relocation and Internment of Civilians, sought to provide an apology and financial reparations to Japanese-Americans interned during World War II. Wiener testified that the commission's report contained numerous misstatements and omissions that led to erroneous conclusions, in part because several of the commissioners had made up their minds before the investigation began. The bill died in committee without coming up for a vote.

In March 2020, Paul R. Baier—the Judge Henry A. Politz Professor of Law at LSU Law Center—published a biography of Wiener based on his unpublished draft autobiography, titled Written in Water. (ISBN 1946074225)

== See also ==
- Civil Liberties Act of 1988
