= William M. Wright =

American general (1863-1943)

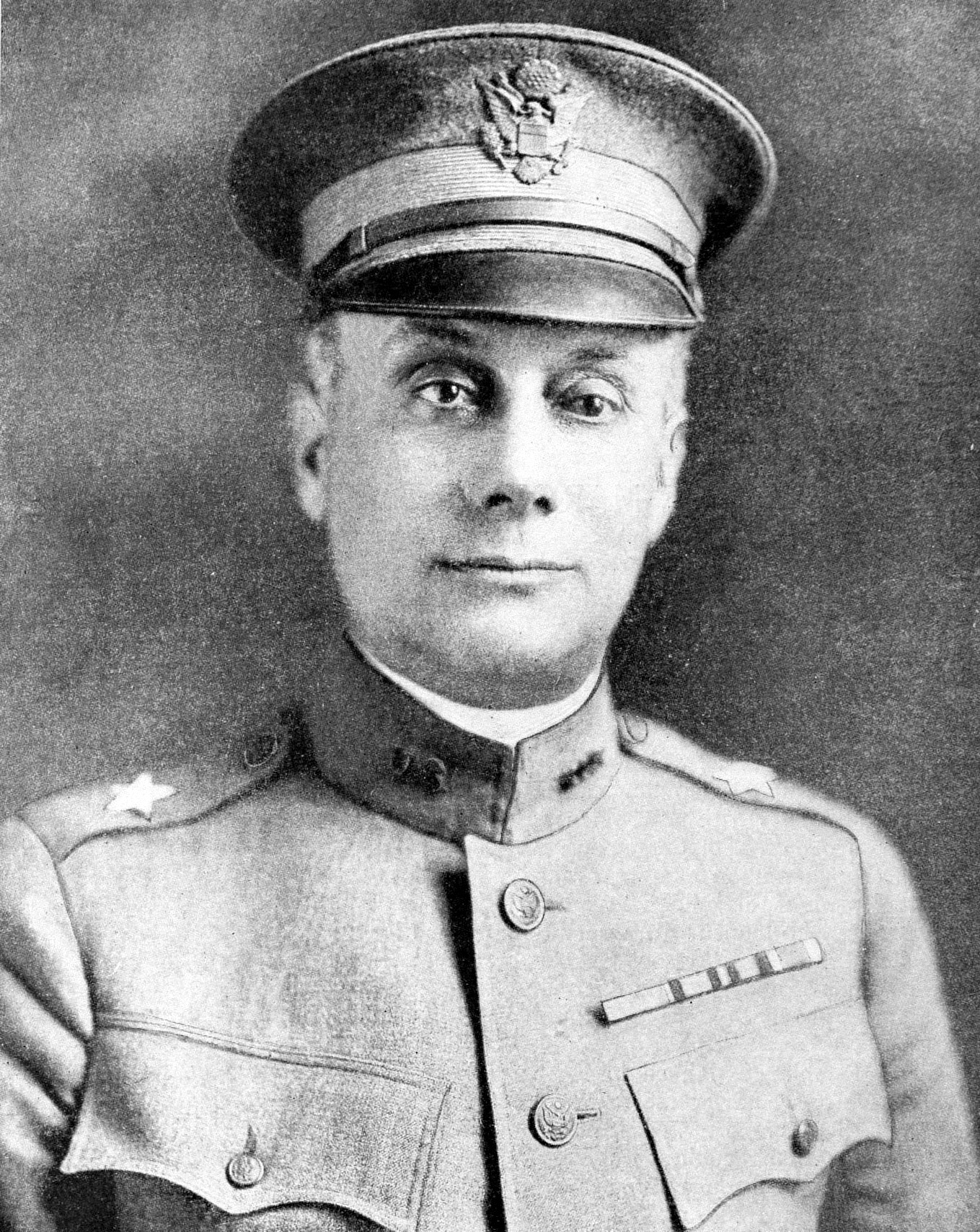
- Harris & Ewing photo of William M. Wright, pictured here as a brigadier general (The World's Work magazine, September 1918)
- Born: September 24, 1863; Newark, New Jersey, United States
- Died: August 16, 1943 (aged 79); Walter Reed Army Medical Center, Washington, D.C., United States
- Burial place: Arlington National Cemetery, Virginia, United States
- Relatives: Marjorie Jerauld (wife) (m. 1891); 3 children (including Jerauld Wright); Stevens Thomson Mason (grandfather); William Wright (grandfather)
- Military career
- Allegiance: United States
- Branch: United States Army
- Service years: 1885–1923
- Rank: Lieutenant General
- Service number: 0-32
- Unit: Infantry Branch
- Commands: 19th Regiment; 35th Division; III Corps; V Corps; VII Corps; 3rd Division; 89th Division; I Corps; IX Corps Area; Department of the Philippines
- Conflicts: Spanish–American War; Philippine–American War; Veracruz occupation Pancho Villa Expedition; World War I
- Awards: Army Distinguished Service Medal; French Legion of Honor (Commander); French French Croix de Guerre with Palm; Belgian Order of Leopold II (Grand Officer); Order of the Rising Sun (Japan); British Order of Saint Michael and Saint George (Companion)

William Mason Wright (September 24, 1863 – August 16, 1943) was a career officer in the United States Army. He attained the rank of lieutenant general and was most notable for his service as a division and corps commander during World War I.

== Early life ==
William M. Wright was born in Newark, New Jersey, on September 24, 1863, He was the son of Dora Mason and Army Colonel Edward H. Wright a career officer whose service included assignments as aide-de-camp to Generals Winfield Scott and George B. McClellan. William M. Wright was the grandson of Michigan Governor Stevens Thomson Mason and U.S. Senator William Wright of New Jersey. Wright was educated at St. John's School in Ossining, New York (also known as St. John's Military Academy).

He attended Yale University and was a member of the Delta Psi fraternity. In 1882 he left Yale for the United States Military Academy, where his roommate was John J. Pershing. Wright failed his semiannual exams in December 1882 and left West Point in January 1883, resigning before school authorities took action to dismiss him.

== Start of military career ==
In 1884, Wright joined the New Jersey National Guard, receiving a captain's commission and appointment as aide-de-camp to the commander of the 1st Brigade.

In January, 1885 he was nominated for appointment as a second lieutenant in the 2nd Infantry Regiment. One of the final acts of outgoing President Chester A. Arthur, Wright's controversial commission received nationwide publicity; it was supported by fellow New Jersey resident Frederick T. Frelinghuysen, the U.S. Secretary of State, and opposed by U.S. Secretary of War Robert T. Lincoln, who argued that someone who had not passed the program of instruction at West Point should not receive the same reward as those who had. His commission was narrowly confirmed by the U.S. Senate in February, 29 votes to 22, meaning that he received his commission more than a year before his peers in the West Point Class of 1886 graduated and received theirs.

Wright's initial assignments were with the 2nd Infantry at posts in the western United States, including Fort Spokane, Washington, Fort Omaha, Nebraska, and Fort Coeur d'Alene, Idaho. From 1889 to 1891 he attended the School of Infantry and Cavalry at Fort Leavenworth, Kansas, after which he rejoined his regiment at Fort Omaha. From 1896 to 1898 Wright was professor of military science at the Massachusetts Agricultural College.

== Spanish–American War ==
Wright served in Cuba during the Spanish–American War. Commissioned as a captain and assistant adjutant general in the U.S. Volunteers, he served in Cuba as aide-de-camp to Major General John C. Bates, commander of the 3rd Division. Wright took part in the Battle of El Caney and the other actions leading to the surrender of Santiago.

In 1899 Wright was promoted to captain in the regular Army. He served in the Philippines during the Philippine–American War, continuing as aide-de-camp to Bates.

== Post-Spanish–American War ==
When Bates returned to the United States in 1901 to take command of the Northern Division of Department of the Missouri, and later the Department of the Lakes, Wright continued to serve as his aide.

From 1905 to 1908 Wright served on the Army Staff. In May 1908, he was promoted to major and assigned as adjutant of the 8th Infantry Regiment, then stationed in the Philippines. From 1911 to 1913, Wright served as adjutant of the Philippine Department.

In 1913, Wright was promoted to lieutenant colonel and assigned as second in command of the 19th Infantry Regiment. In 1914 he graduated from the School of Field Officers at Fort Leavenworth. During the next two years he took part in both the Veracruz occupation and Pancho Villa Expedition. In July 1916, Wright was promoted to colonel as commander of the 19th Infantry.

== World War I ==
=== Commands ===
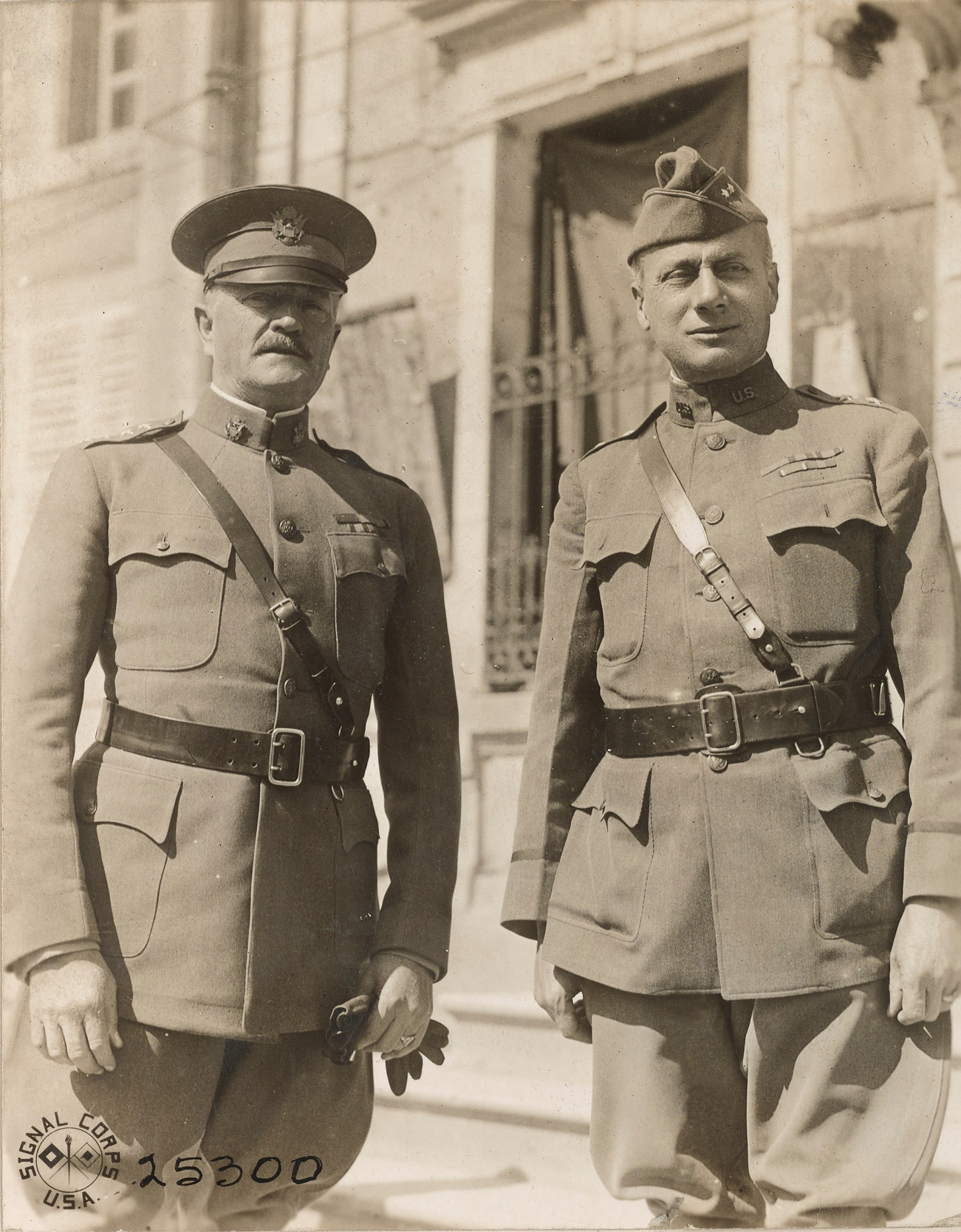
Major General William M. Wright with General John J. Pershing, Commander-in-Chief (C-in-C) of the American Expeditionary Forces (AEF), in Lucey, France, September 8, 1918.

After the American entry into World War I in April 1917, Wright was promoted to brigadier general and assigned to command the Hoboken, New Jersey Port of Embarkation.

Wright served in France during the second half of 1918, successively commanding the 35th Division, the III, V, and VII Corps. As VII Corps commander, Wright led the unit while it served under the French Eighth Army in the Vosges Mountains). As commander of the 89th Division he took part in the Battle of Saint-Mihiel and the final operations of the Meuse–Argonne offensive. While in command of the 89th Division, Wright's aide-de-camp was Charles H. Gerhardt, the son of Brigadier General Charles Gerhardt, who would go on to serve with distinction during World War II.

During the post-war occupation of Germany, Wright commanded I Corps. He received the Army Distinguished Service Medal in recognition of his superior performance of duty throughout the war.

=== Armistice Day attack ===
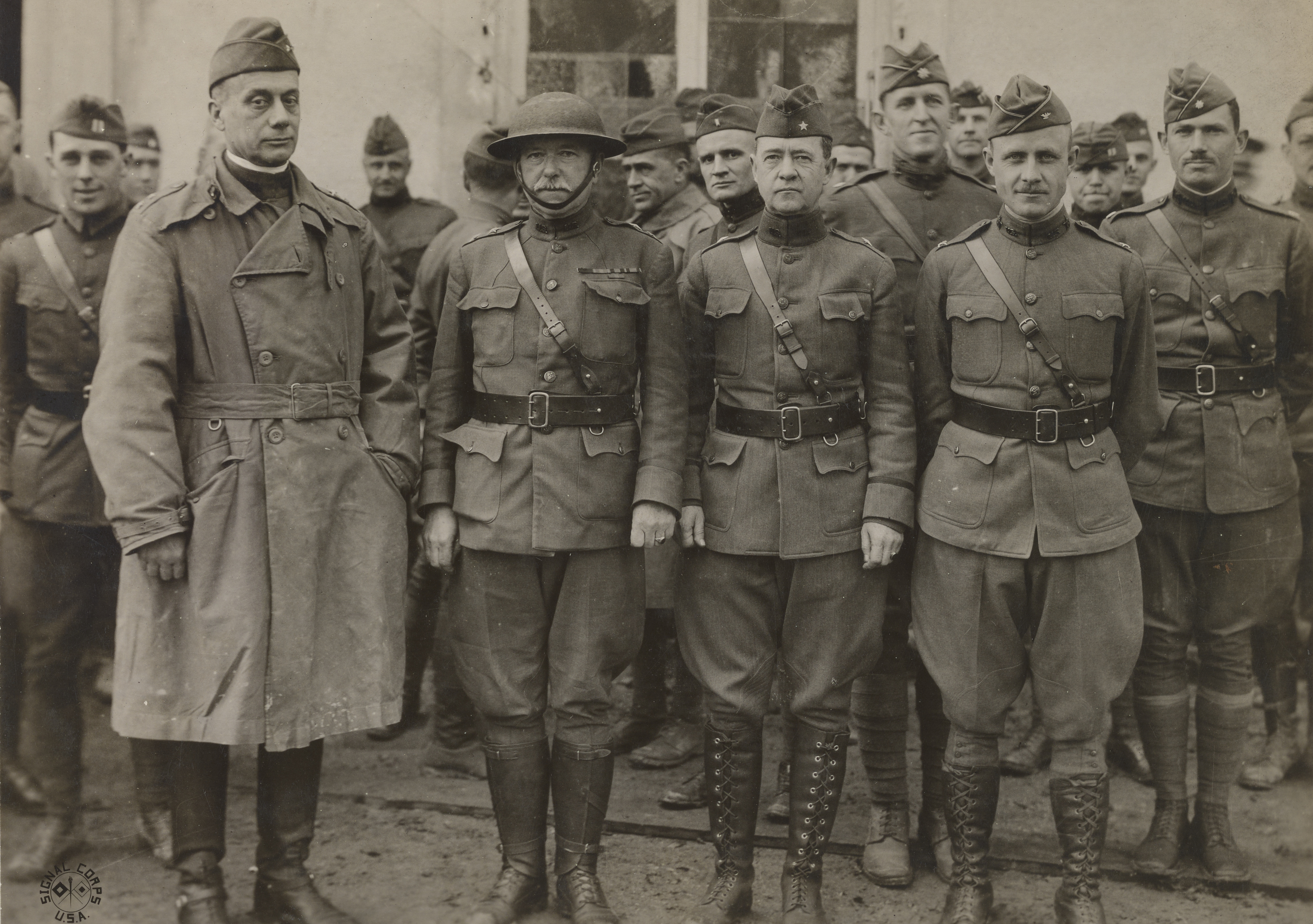
From left to right: Major General William M. Wright, commanding the 89th Division, Major General Frank L. Winn, to succeed Wright in command of the 89th, and Brigadier General Henry D. Todd Jr., commanding the 58th Field Artillery Brigade, Stenay, Meuse, France, November 12, 1918. Standing behind Wright is his aide-de-camp, Captain Charles H. Gerhardt.

On November 11, 1918, Armistice Day, Wright was in command of the 89th Division and carried out an already planned attack against the town of Stenay only a few hours before the armistice was to take effect. There were 365 casualties, including 61 dead. One rationale for the attack was that he did not want the Germans to occupy the town after the armistice took effect, because Wright intended to make use of the town's bathhouses and other public works, given the amount of time his dirty troops had gone so long without baths or showers. Detractors suggested Wright wanted to capture Stenay because it had cachet as the recent headquarters of Prince Rupprecht, a senior commander of German troops. Another reason offered by Wright in testimony before Congress was that commanders had not been informed how long the armistice would be in effect; several continued with already planned attacks in order to improve their tactical positions, so that they could operate from a position of advantage if hostilities resumed. Yet another rationale was provided by Brigadier General Fox Conner; in his Congressional testimony, Conner indicated that at the time of the armistice, severe bad weather was expected; since Stenay was one of the few towns in the area with large buildings still standing, Conner and other AEF headquarters staff wanted to occupy the town so the buildings could be used for quartering troops. In addition, those who questioned Wright's decision to carry out the 89th Division's attack pointed to a rivalry with Major General Henry T. Allen, commander of the adjacent 90th Division, who also attempted to capture Stenay. When it became clear that Wright and other senior commanders had ordered assaults with full knowledge that the Armistice would go into effect imminently, Allied soldiers and civilians became outraged; there was controversy, but commanders, including Wright, were never punished or reprimanded.

=== Journal ===
During World War I Wright kept a journal, which was later published as Meuse-Argonne Diary: A Division Commander in World War I.

== After the war ==
Following the war, Wright commanded the 3rd Division, then served as Executive Assistant to General Peyton C. March, the Chief of Staff of the United States Army, and acting Army Chief of Staff. He then commanded Ninth Corps Area. In 1922, he was assigned to command the Department of the Philippines, and he retired in 1923.

== Reputation ==
Wright was a highly regarded trainer of soldiers and combat leader. In his memoirs, Pershing indicated that Wright left West Point only because he had difficulty passing geometry, and that his classmates approved of Wright obtaining his commission through an alternate route, even though he received his before they received theirs. Pershing also commended Wright's leadership during World War I, as did former Army Chief of Staff Leonard Wood and senior British commander Field Marshal Sir Douglas Haig, Commander-in-Chief (C-in-C) of the British Expeditionary Force (BEF).

== Personal ==
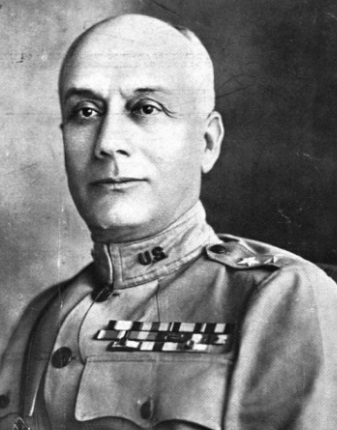
Wright's photo appeared on the cover of the April 1, 1922 edition of the American Chamber of Commerce Journal, published by the ACC of the Philippines.

In June 1891, Wright married Marjorie Jerauld. They were the parents of: Colonel William Mason Wright, Jr. (1893–1977), who served in France during World War I, in the China Burma India Theater during World War II, and commanded the Armed Forces Education and Information Service and the Armed Forces Radio Service during and after World War II; Admiral and U.S. Ambassador to the Republic of China (Taiwan) Jerauld Wright (1898–1995); and Marjorie Wright (1900-1985), who married David McK. Key, and worked for the United States Department of State as a cultural affairs assistant and in other positions.

In retirement, he resided in Washington, D.C. Wright died at Washington, D.C.'s Walter Reed Army Hospital on August 16, 1943, and was buried at Arlington National Cemetery, Section 2, Grave 4956-NH.

== Awards ==
In 1942, the U.S. Congress passed legislation allowing retired Army generals to be advanced one rank on the retired list or posthumously if they had been recommended in writing during World War I for a promotion which they did not receive, and if they had received the Medal of Honor, the Distinguished Service Cross or the Army Distinguished Service Medal. Wright and James G. Harbord were among those who met these criteria, and they were promoted to lieutenant general on July 9, 1942.

He received the following awards:

- Army Distinguished Service Medal
- Spanish Campaign Medal
- Philippine Campaign Medal
- Mexican Service Medal
- World War I Victory Medal
- Grand Officer of the Order of Leopold II (Belgium)
- Commander of the Legion of Honor (France)
- Croix de Guerre with Palm (France)
- Companion of the Order of Saint Michael and Saint George (United Kingdom)
- Order of the Rising Sun (Japan)

=== Citation for Army Distinguished Service Medal ===
"For exceptionally meritorious and distinguished services. He commanded in turn the Thirty-fifth Division; the Third, Fifth, and Seventh Army Corps, under the Eighth French Army in the Vosges Mountains, and later commanded the Eighty-ninth Division in the St. Mihiel offensive and in the final operations on the Meuse River, where he proved himself to be an energetic and aggressive leader."

General Order 12 (January 17, 1919)

Military offices
Preceded by Newly activated organization	Commanding General 35th Division; August−September 1917	Succeeded by Lucien G. Berry
Preceded by Lucien G. Berry	Commanding General 35th Division; 1917−1918	Succeeded by Nathaniel F. McClure
Preceded by Newly activated organization	Commanding General III Corps; June−July 1918	Succeeded by Robert Lee Bullard
Preceded by Newly activated organization	Commanding General V Corps; July−August 1918	Succeeded by George H. Cameron
Preceded by Newly activated organization	Commanding General VII Corps; August−September 1918	Succeeded by Omar Bundy
Preceded by Frank L. Winn	Commanding General 89th Division; September−November 1918	Succeeded by Frank L. Winn
Preceded by Joseph T. Dickman	Commanding General 3rd Division; 1919–1920	Succeeded by Ora E. Hunt
