= Pershing House =

Historic house in Texas, United States

- U.S. National Register of Historic Places
- U.S. Historic district – Contributing property
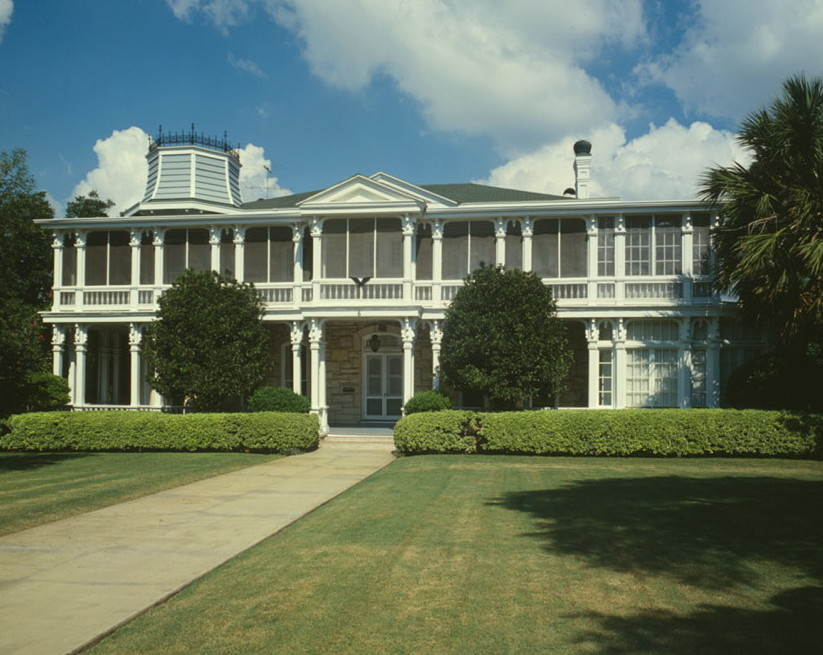
- Pershing House; Fort Sam Houston

- Location within Texas Location within the United States
- Location: Staff Post Rd., Fort Sam Houston, San Antonio, Texas; United States
- Coordinates: 29°26′42″N 98°28′10″W
- Area: 10,830 square feet (1,000 m^{2})
- Built: 1881
- Architect: Alfred Giles
- Architectural style: Early Texas Victorian
- Part of: Fort Sam Houston (ID75001950)
- NRHP reference No.: 74002058
- Added to NRHP: 30 July 1974

Pershing House has been the residence of the commanding officers of Fort Sam Houston since 1881. Located in Bexar County, San Antonio, Texas, the military post is currently part of Joint Base San Antonio. The house was added to the National Register of Historic Places listings on 30 July 1974. After the Texas annexation to the Union in 1845, the United States Army became a steady presence in what was then designated the Department of Texas, providing a line of defense during both the 1846–1848 Mexican–American War, and the Texas–Indian wars that ended with the 1875 surrender of Comanche chief Quanah Parker at Fort Sill, Oklahoma. The combining of Fort Sam Houston, Randolph Air Force Base, Lackland Air Force Base and Martindale Army Airfield, to create Joint Base San Antonio, took place in 2009.

Following the end of the American Civil War, the United States Department of War accepted an offer from San Antonio for three parcels of land on which the United States Army would construct Fort Sam Houston. The site and its surrounding area would come to be known as Government Hill. Edward Braden Construction began work on the project in 1876. Architect Alfred Giles designed the general staff quarters, as well as the commanding general's quarters, now known at Pershing House. Constructed in 1881 at a cost of $17,076 (equivalent to $457,000 in 2020), it was originally designated as "Quarters No. 6, Staff Post". The 10,830 square feet (1,000 m^{2}), two-story house has eleven rooms, six full bathrooms and one half bath. (Note: In the United States, a "half bath" is a bathroom with a sink and toilet, but no bathtub.) In various phases during the 20th century, improvements included an enclosed porch and upgrades to plumbing, electricity and air conditioning.

While under its original name, the house would become the residence of 16 succeeding commanding officers. They were some of the most accomplished leaders in the United States Army prior to their being given charge of the base. The first occupant of the house was Major General Christopher C. Augur, a West Point graduate and veteran of several military conflicts, including the Mexican–American War and the American Civil War. Numerous Medal of Honor recipients have resided there.

The house has been referred to by its current name since John J. Pershing served as the base commanding officer in 1917, following his participation in the Pancho Villa Expedition. He was at Fort Sam Houston only two months before being given charge of the American Expeditionary Forces in Europe. Pershing held the rank of General of the Armies. The only other American to hold that rank was George Washington. The names of all the occupants from 1881 through 1973 appear on two brass-plated plaques that were initially created in the 1950s by Julia Cotton White, wife of General Isaac D. White, who was then serving as commanding officer. She presented them as a gift to Fort Sam Houston, and they were kept up to date by succeeding residents at least through 1973 when the house was added to the National Register of Historic Places.

== Commanding officer chronology 1881 through 1973 ==
=== Key to military ranks ===
- GA General of the Armies (5 stars)
- CSA Chief of Staff of the United States Army, General (4 stars). As of 1943, all Chiefs of Staff are stationed in The Pentagon. Prior to that date, they all worked on-site at local bases.
- 4SG General (4 stars)
- LG Lieutenant General (3 stars)
- MG Major General (2 stars)
- BG Brigadier General (1 star)

=== Key to burial sites ===
| ANC | Arlington National Cemetery | CC | Congressional Cemetery | FB | Fort Bliss National Cemetery |
| FSH | Fort Sam Houston National Cemetery | FSPC | Fort Sill Post Cemetery | LVC | Lake View Cemetery |
| MAG | Magnolia Cemetery | MAN | Mansfield Cemetery | OC | Oakwood Cemetery |
| SFNC | San Francisco National Cemetery | SB | Santa Barbara Cemetery | SMEC | St. Mary's Episcopal Churchyard |
| SAHNC | United States Soldiers' and Airmen's Home National Cemetery | WP | West Point Cemetery |

=== Residents ===
Fort Sam Houston commanding officers who lived at Pershing House 1881 through 1973
| Residency | Name | Rank | Image | Birth–Death | Burial site | Notes | Refs |
|---|---|---|---|---|---|---|---|
| 1881–1883 | Christopher C. Augur | BG | Christopher Augur | (1821–1898) | ANC | Veteran of the American Civil War. Burned Native American villages during the Texas Red River War, in conjunction with the military actions of Ranald S. Mackenzie | |
| 1883 | Ranald S. Mackenzie | BG | Ranald S. Mackenzie | (1840–1899) | WP | Union general during the American Civil War, later fought in numerous Texas–Indian wars | |
| 1883–1884 | John M. Schofield | LG | John M. Schofield | (1831–1906) | ANC | Medal of Honor for action at the August 10, 1861 Battle of Wilson's Creek. Schofield Barracks in Hawaii named for him. | |
| 1884–1892 | David S. Stanley | BG | David S. Stanley | (1828–1902) | SAHNC | Medal of Honor for action November 30, 1864 Battle of Franklin | |
| 1892–1895 | Frank Wheaton | MG | Frank Wheaton | (1833–1903) | ANC | Served in the American Civil War and Indian Wars. Inducted into the Rhode Island Heritage Hall of Fame | |
| 1895–1897 | Zenas R. Bliss | MG | Zenas R. Bliss | (1835–1900) | ANC | Medal of Honor for actions at the 1862 Battle of Fredericksburg | |
| 1897–1898 | William Montrose Graham | MG | — | (1834–1916) | CC | Peninsula campaign, Battle of Antietam, Battle of Gettysburg, Battle of Malvern Hill, Spanish–American War | |
| 1899–1901 | Chambers McKibbin | BG | — | (1841–1918) | ANC | Brigadier General of volunteers and conscripts, Santiago campaign | |
| 1902–1904 | Frederick Dent Grant | MG | Frederick Dent Grant | (1850–1912) | WP | U.S. Minister to Austria-Hungary (1889–1893); New York City Police Commissioner (1895–1897). Son of Ulysses S. Grant | |
| 1904–1906 | Jesse M. Lee | BG | — | (1843–1926) | ANC | Served in the American Civil War. Spanish–American War, Philippine–American War Boxer Rebellion | |
| 1906–1907 | William S. McCaskey | MG | — | (1843–1914) | SFNC | Enlisted at the start of the Battle of Fort Sumter; participated in Sherman's March to the Sea | |
| 1907–1910 | Albert L. Myer | BG | — | (1846–1914) | OC | Acting Alcalde of Ponce, Puerto Rico, during the United States Puerto Rico campaign | |
| 1910–1911 | Ralph Wilson Hoyt | BG | Ralph Wilson Hoytalt=Ralph Wilson Holt | (1849–1920) | LVC | Service in the Spanish–American War and the Puerto Rico campaign | |
| 1911–1912 | Joseph Wilson Duncan | BG | — | (1853–1912) | ANC | First Battle of Bud Dajo, Philippine Islands | |
| 1913–1915 | Tasker H. Bliss | CSA | Tasker H. Blilss | (1853–1930) | ANC | Chief of Staff of the United States Army, American Permanent Military Representative, Supreme War Council | |
| 1915–1917 | Frederick Funston | MG | Frederick Funston | (1865–1917) | SFNC | Medal of Honor for April 27, action at 1899 Calumpit, Luzon, Philippine Islands | |
| 1917 | John J. Pershing | GA | John J. Pershing | (1860–1948) | ANC | Arrived February 21, 1917, departed May 2 to take charge of American Expeditionary Forces in Europe | |
| 1917 | James Parker | MG | James Parker | (1854–1934) | SMEC | Medal of Honor for actions on December 4, 1899, during the Philippine–American War | |
| 1917–1918 | John Wilson Ruckman | MG | — | (1858–1921) | WP | Presided over the trial of black soldiers following the Houston riot of 1917, and ordered the verdicts kept secret, with no appeals. Relieved of command May 1918 | |
| 1918 | Willard Ames Holbrook | MG | Willard Ames Holbrook | (1860–1932) | ANC | Graduate of US Military Academy, served during the Philippine–American War Civil Governor of the province of Antique, Panay in the Philippine Islands | |
| 1918–1919 | DeRosey Caroll Cabell | MG | DeRosey C. Cabell | (1861–1924) | SFNC | Former Chief of Staff to John J. Pershing | |
| 1919–1921 | Joseph T. Dickman | MG | Joseph T. Dickman | (1857–1927) | ANC | Commanding General, VIII Corps Area | |
| 1921–1922 | John L. Hines | CSA | John Hines | (1868–1968) | ANC | Veteran of the Spanish–American War and the Philippine–American War | |
| 1922–1924 | Edward Mann Lewis | MG | Edward Mann Lewis | (1863–1949) | SFNC | Served in the Spanish–American War | |
| 1924–1925 | Charles Pelot Summerall | 4SG | Charles Pelot Summerall | (1867–1955) | ANC | Chief of Staff of the United States Army 1926–1930; president of The Citadel 1931–1953 | |
| 1925–1928 | Ernest Hinds | MG | Ernest Hinds | (1864–1941) | FSH | Chief of Artillery for the American Expeditionary Forces | |
| 1928 | Thomas Quinton Donaldson Jr. | MG | — | (1864–1934) | ANC | Veteran of the Wounded Knee Massacre | |
| 1928–1930 | William Lassiter | MG | William Lassiter | (1867–1959) | SB | Spanish–American War, World War I | |
| 1930–1933 | Edwin B. Winans | MG | Ernest B. Wimans | (1869–1947) | WP | World War I, Pancho Villa Expedition (aka Punitive Expedition, U.S. Army), Philippine–American War | |
| 1933–1936 | Johnson Hagood | MG | Johnson Hagood | (1873–1948) | MAG | West Point graduate; removed from command in Texas following his public criticism of President Roosevelt's funding of the WPA. | |
| 1936 | Frank Parker | MG | Frank Parker | (1872–1947) | MAN | Served in the Philippines, Puerto Rico, Cuba, South America, China, France | |
| 1936–1940 | Herbert Jay Brees | LG | Herbert Ja Brees | (1877–1958) | FSH | Spanish–American War, World War I, World War II | |
| 1941–1942 | Walter Krueger | 4SG | Walter Kruger | (1881–1967) | ANC | Commander of the Sixth United States Army in the South Pacific | |
| 1942–1943 | Courtney Hodges | 4SG | Courtney Hodges | (1887–1966) | ANC | Commanded First U.S. Army 1944–45 | |
| 1944 | William Hood Simpson | 4SG | William Hood Simpson | (1888–1990) | ANC | Commanding General of the Ninth United States Army European Theater of Operations during World War II. | |
| 1944–1945 | John P. Lucas | MG | John P. Lucas | (1890–1949) | ANC | Commander of VI Corps during the Battle of Anzio (Operation Shingle) in the Italian Campaign of World War II. | |
| 1945 | Alexander Patch | 4SG | Alexander Patch | (1889–1945) | WP | World War II, commander U.S. Army and Marine Corps forces during the Guadalcanal campaign in the Pacific, and the Seventh Army on the Western Front in Europe. | |
| 1946–1947 | Jonathan M. Wainwright | 4SG | Jonathan M. Wainwright | (1883–1953) | ANC | World War II Commander of US forces 12 March to 7 May 1942 during the fall of the Philippines. | |
| 1947–1949 | Thomas T. Handy | 4SG | Thomas T. Handy | (1892–1982) | ANC | World War I and World War II | |
| 1949–1952 | LeRoy Lutes | LG | LeRoy Lutes | (1890–1980) | ANC | World War II commanding general of the Fourth United States Army. | |
| 1952–1953 | William M. Hoge | 4SG | William M. Hoge | (1894–1979) | ANC | Distinguished Service Medal and Silver Star for heroism under fire during World War I; also served in World War II and the Korean War. | |
| 1953 | John E. Dahlquist | 4SG | John E. Dahlquist | (1896–1975) | ANC | World War II, Cold War,. His utilization of the Japanese-American 442nd Regimental Combat Team led to them being the most highly decorated unit in the history of the US Armed Forces. | |
| 1953–1955 | Isaac D. White | 4SG | Isaac D. White | (1901–1990) | Unknown | Commanding General of the United States Constabulary for the European Command, and of X Corps during the Korean War. | |
| 1955–1958 | John Howell Collier | LG | Howell Collier | (1899–1980) | FSH | Commander of 2nd Armored Division units in World War II and as the Inspector of Armor, Office of the Chief of Army Field Forces. | |
| 1958–1959 | Guy S. Meloy Jr. | 4SG | Gus S. Meloy | (1903–1964) | ANC | Served as commander of all U.S. forces in Korea during the Cold War. | |
| 1959–1961 | Edward Thomas Williams | LG | Edward Thomas Williams | (1901–1973) | FSH | Chief of artillery for the Third United States Army in Europe during World War II, commander of the United States Army Field Artillery Center. | |
| 1961–1962 | Donald Prentice Booth | LG | Donald Prentice Booth | (1902–1993) | ANC | Chief of Staff, Persian Gulf Command 1944–45, U.S. High Commissioner, Ryukyu Islands 1958–1961 | |
| 1962–1964 | Carl H. Jark | LG | — | (1905–1984) | FSH | When Jark retired, Texas Congressman Henry B. González read his military record into the Congressional Record | |
| 1964–1966 | Robert Wesley Colglazier Jr. | LG | Robert Wesley Colglazier Jr. | (1904–1993) | FSH | He was the highest-ranking member of the Army Reserve on duty with the Regular Army at the time of his retirement. | |
| 1966–1967 | Thomas W. Dunn | LG | — | (1908–1983) | WP | World War II, the Korean War | |
| 1967–1968 | Lawrence Joseph Lincoln | LG | — | (1909–2000) | ANC | Distinguished Service Medal for services to the War Department during World War II. | |
| 1968–1971 | Harry H. Critz | LG | — | (1912–1982) | FSPC | Service in Europe until 1948, returning to Fort Sill. Korean War in 1953 and 1954. Commander of the U.S. Army Field Artillery Center, Fort Sill. | |
| 1971 | George G. O'Connor | LG | — | (1914–1971) | WP | World War II service in the Battle of Luzon, commander of the 4th Infantry Division during the Vietnam War and of the VII Corps in West Germany. | |
| 1971 | George V. Underwood Jr. | 4SG | George V. Underwood Jr. | (1913–1984) | FB | Multiple tours of duty in San Franicsco, Hawaii and China; Assistant to the Special Representative of China envoy General George C. Marshall. 1966 Commanding General, 32d Artillery Brigade, in Kaiserslautern, Germany. | |
| 1971–1973 | Patrick F. Cassidy | LG | — | (1915–1990) | FSH | World War II veteran, Commanding Officer, 1st Battalion, 502d Infantry Regiment, 101st Airborne Division. | |

== See also ==
- List of major generals in the United States Regular Army before 1 July 1920
- Major general (United States)
- General officers in the United States
- List of United States Army four-star generals
- List of lieutenant generals in the United States Army before 1960
- List of brigadier generals in the United States Regular Army before February 2, 1901

== Notes ==
=== Bibliography ===
- NRHP (1974). "Pershing House" (PDF). US Department of the Interior.
