= Carl H. Jark =

United States Army general (1905–1984)

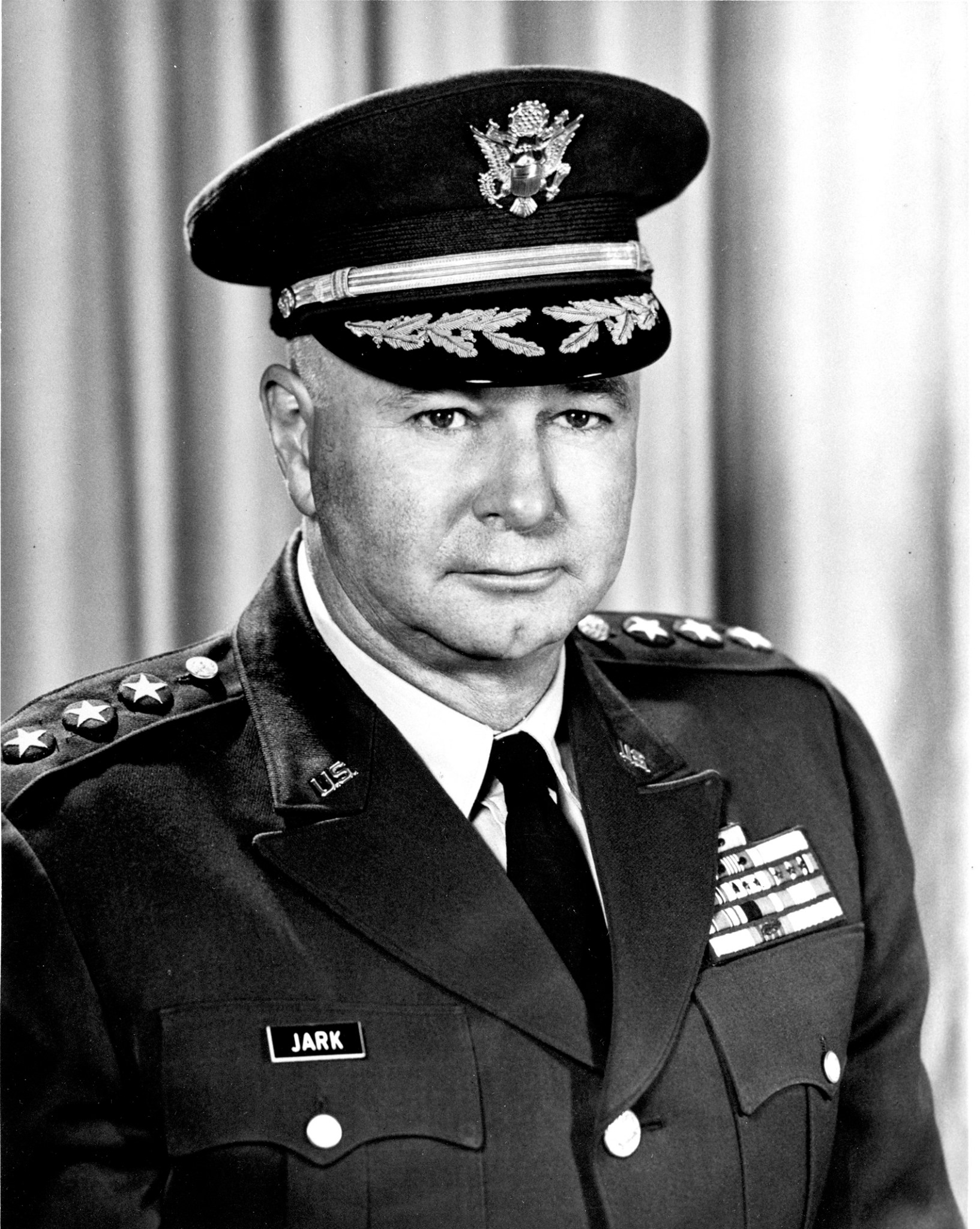
- LTG Carl H. Jark, USA
- Born: June 13, 1905; Leigh, Nebraska, United States
- Died: March 22, 1984 (aged 78); San Antonio, Texas, United States
- Burial place: Fort Sam Houston National Cemetery, Texas, United States
- Military career
- Allegiance: United States
- Branch: United States Army
- Service years: 1929–1964
- Rank: Lieutenant General
- Nickname: "Tiny"
- Service number: 0-17556
- Unit: Field Artillery Branch
- Commands: Fourth United States Army; 7th Infantry Division
- Conflicts: World War II; Landing on Emirau; Rhineland; Ardennes-Alsace; Central Europe; Korean War
- Awards: Distinguished Service Medal; Legion of Merit (2); Bronze Star Medal (2); Army Commendation Medal (3); Croix de Guerre 1939–1945

Carl Henry Jark (June 13, 1905 – March 22, 1984) was a highly decorated officer in the United States Army with the rank of Lieutenant General. While Cadet at the United States Military Academy at West Point, New York he broke the world's discus throw record in 1929 at the Drake Relays.

A veteran of World War II, Jark distinguished himself as Executive officer of Artillery of the 63rd Infantry Division ("Blood and Fire") serving in the European theatre. He remained in the Army following a war and took part in the Korean War as Deputy Assistant Chief of Staff for Operations on the General Headquarters of Far East Command in Tokyo, Japan rising to the rank of Brigadier general.

Following the assignments as Major general in the Office of the Secretary of Defense and United States European Command, he was promoted to the rank of Lieutenant General and assumed command of the Fourth United States Army at Fort Sam Houston, Texas before retiring in July 1964.

== Early career ==
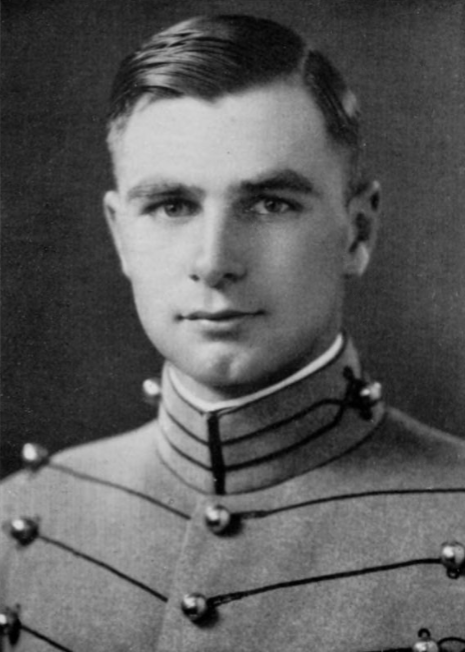
Jark as Cadet at West Point in 1929.

Carl Henry Jark was born on June 13, 1905 in Leigh, Nebraska as the son of Robert William Jark (1877-1952) and Clara Sophia Huckfeldt (1883-1964). His father was born on the Isle of Rügen in Germany and came into United States in June 1892. He was naturalized in March 1906 and settled in Beatrice, Nebraska where he became engaged in grain elevator business. Young Carl attended the Beatrice High School graduating with honors in summer of 1924 and during his time at the high school he excelled in football which helped him secure an appointment to the United States Military Academy at West Point, New York from Senator Melvin O. McLaughlin from Fourth District.

Jark entered West Point in early July 1925 and became involved in football, wrestling and track; he was also pistol sharpshooter and rifle marksman. He reached the rank of Cadet-Captain, commanding M Company and earned a nickname "Tiny" which was a oxymoron, Jark was 6’ 5” at the time. During his senior year at West Point, he broke the world's discus throw record in 1929 at the Drake Relays.

Upon graduation with Bachelor of Science degree on his 24th birthday, he was commissioned second lieutenant in the Field Artillery and ordered to the Air Corps Primary Flying School at March Field, California for aviation training. He sought to be a pilot and his instructors included late generals Millard F. Harmon or Leo A. Walton, however he was not able to complete the training and was relieved from the in late January 1930.

He subsequently joined the Battery "A" of 1st Battalion, 18th Field Artillery at Fort Sill, Oklahoma and served two years in that capacity before entered the Army Field Artillery School located there. Jark completed the Battery Officers' Course mid-May 1933 and enrolled the Advanced Motors Course also at the Artillery School.

Following the graduation in June 1934, Jark embarked for Hawaii where he joined the Service Battery of 13th Field Artillery at Schofield Barracks. He was promoted to First lieutenant in October that year and assumed additional duty regimental football coach. After two years of service in Hawaii, Jark was transferred to Fort Bragg, North Carolina where he assumed duty as Commanding Officer, Service Battery, 17th Field Artillery Regiment under Colonel George R. Allin.

== World War II ==
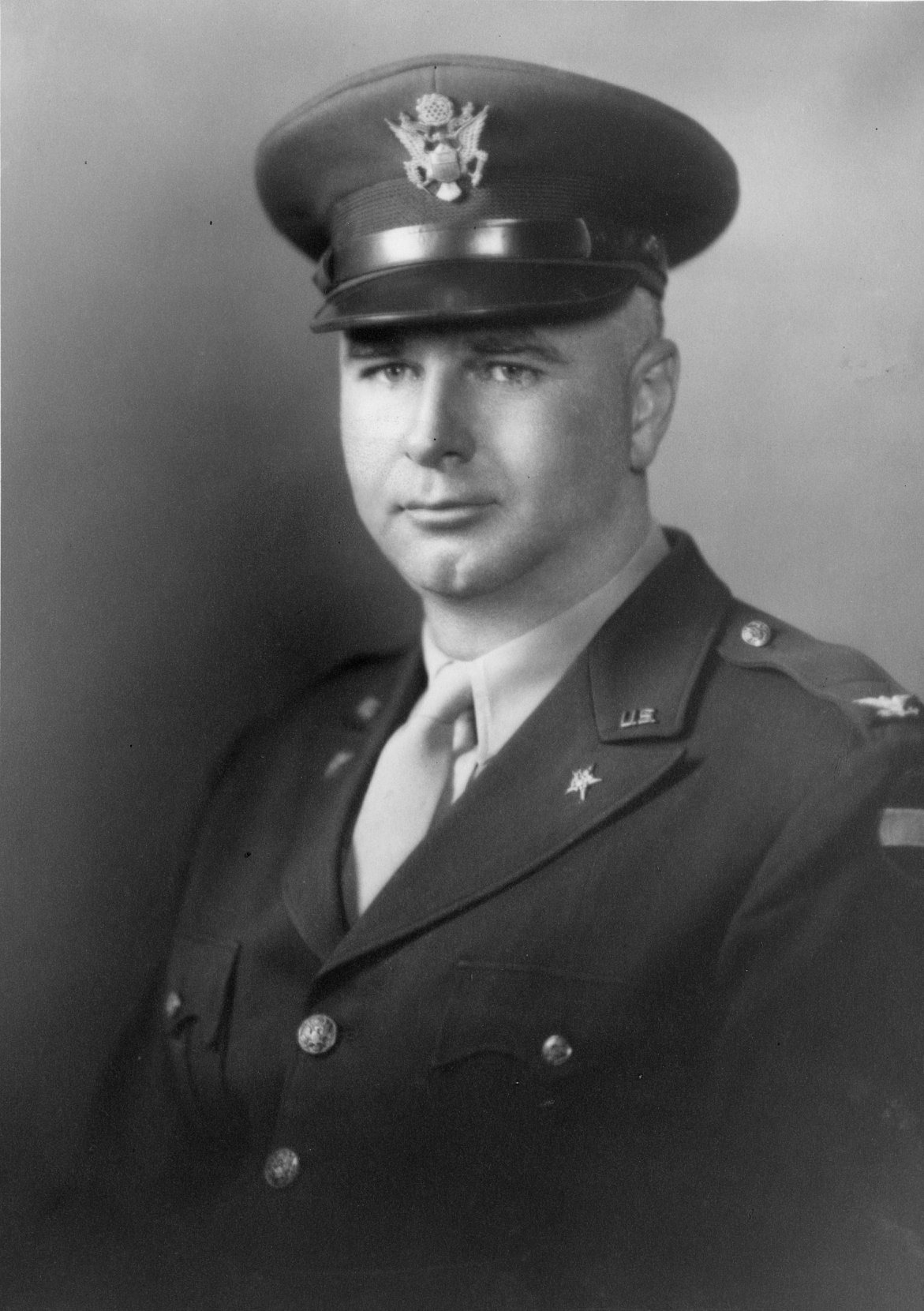
Jark as Colonel in 1944.

In June 1939, Jark was promoted to Captain and transferred back to the Army Field Artillery School at Fort Sill, Oklahoma where he assumed duty as an Instructor in the Department of Motors. Following the outbreak of World War II in September 1939, President Franklin D. Roosevelt declared a limited national emergency and newly appointed Army chief of staff General George C. Marshall set about expanding and modernizing the Army in preparation for war.

In early April 1941, Commandant of the Artillery School, now Brigadier general George R. Allin appointed Jark a Commanding officer of the newly established Officer Candidate School at Fort Sill. Jark was given a staff of instructors to plan and execute the new organization, discipline and academic instruction of the school. One hundred twenty-five students were enrolled in the first class in July, and the school rapidly grew to a capacity of 6600 with 500 new students entering every week. Jark was promoted to the temporary rank of Major in October 1941 and to lieutenant colonel in May 1942. He remained in command of Officer Candidate School until August 1942 when he was succeeded by Major Cragie Krayenbuhl. For his service in this capacity, Jark later received Army Commendation Medal.

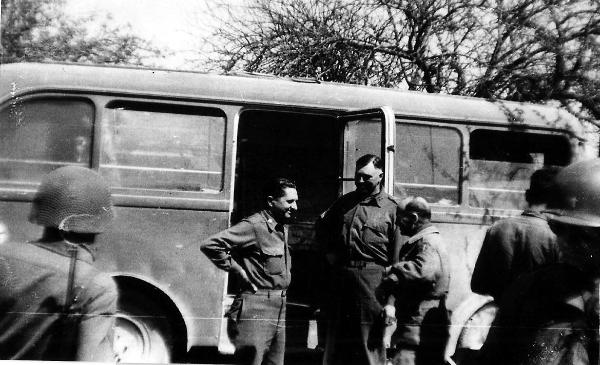
Jark with officers of 63rd Division Artillery at Gerstetten, Germany, April 25, 1945.

Jark was subsequently assigned to the Department of Gunnery within the Army Field Artillery School and served as an Instructor until January 1943, when he was ordered to the Army Command and General Staff School at Fort Leavenworth, Kansas. He completed the twelve-week special course in May that year and joined the Plans and Operations at the headquarters of Army Ground Forces in Washington, D.C. While in this capacity, Jark was promoted to the temporary rank of Colonel in late January 1944 and ordered to the South Pacific as an Observer with 4th Marine Regiment participating in the unopposed landing on Emirau in late March 1944.

In August 1944, Jark was ordered to Camp Van Dorn, Mississippi where he joined the headquarters of 63rd Infantry Division ("Blood and Fire") under Major general Louis E. Hibbs. He was appointed Executive Officer of Divisional Artillery under Brigadier general Edward J. McGaw and took in the intensive training for deployment in the European theatre. Jark accompanied the division to France in November 1944 and took part in the combats in Ardennes-Alsace, Rhineland and Central Europe.

He distinguished himself several times and received Legion of Merit, two Bronze Star Medals and another Army Commendation Medal. Jark was also decorated with Croix de Guerre 1939–1945 with Palm by the Government of France.

== Postwar service ==
Following the V-E Day, Jark was ordered back to the United States and assigned back to the Army Field Artillery School at Fort Sill, Oklahoma where his last commanding general Louis E. Hibbs was appointed Commandant of the school. He served as his Executive officer until the end of May 1946, when general Hibbs was transferred to the Philippines for duty as Commanding general, 12th Infantry Division. Jark accompanied him and served as Divisional Chief of Staff until February 1947.

He was subsequently transferred to Yokohama, Japan where he joined the headquarters of Eighth U.S. Army under lieutenant general Robert L. Eichelberger as Artillery Officer. However Jark spent only three months in Japan and returned to the United States in August 1947 in order to enter the National War College. Due to postwar reduction of the Army, he was reduced to the permanent rank of lieutenant colonel in February 1948 while still at the College.

Upon graduation in June 1948, Jark was ordered to Washington, D.C. where he joined the Administrative Division, Department of the Army as Unit Chief of Personnel. He was subsequently transferred to the Plans & Operations Division and appointed Chief of Operations Branch.

After the outbreak of Korean War in summer 1950, Jark was ordered to Tokyo, Japan as newly promoted Colonel and appointed Deputy Assistant Chief of Staff for Operations (O-3) within the General Headquarters of Far East Command under General Douglas MacArthur. Jark participated in the creation of training and operational plans directly related to the combat deployment of ground, sea and air forces until December 1951 and received his second Legion of Merit for his service.

In early January 1952, Jark was transferred to the headquarters of 1st Cavalry Division under Major general Thomas L. Harrold and assumed duty as Commanding Officer of Divisional Artillery. He accompanied division to Hokkaido, the northernmost island in Japan, where it carried out combat training, electronic surveillance and defense of Japan from potential attacks by the Soviet Union or China. While in this capacity, Jark was promoted to the temporary rank of Brigadier general on May 15, 1952.

Jark returned to the United States in August 1952 and after several weeks leave of absence, he assumed duty as Chief of the Organization and Training, Office of the Assistant Chief of Staff for Operations (G-3), Department of the Army in Washington, D.C. While in this capacity, he was responsible for the training program of training and reserve units including 37th, 38th or 87th Infantry Divisions.

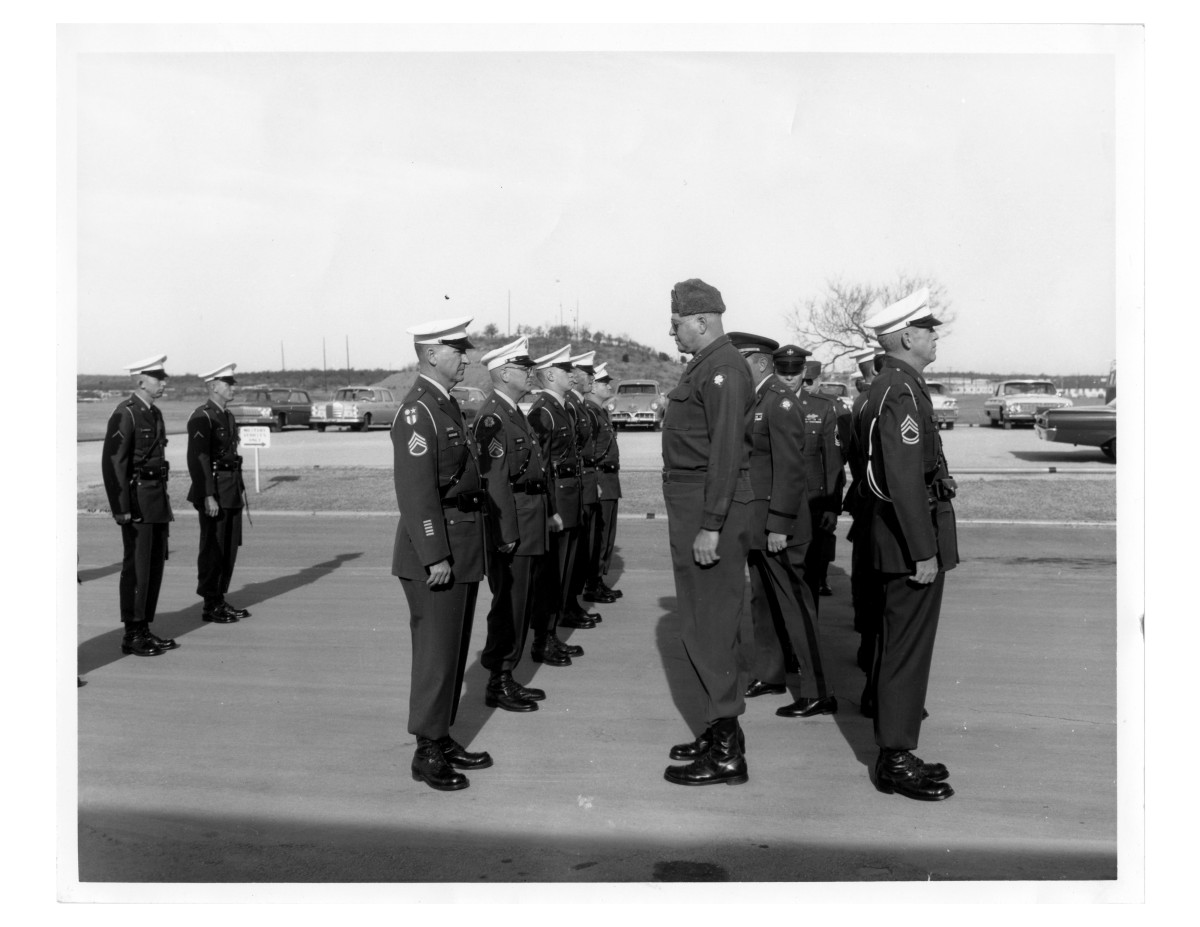
Jark during inspection of Military Police detachment at Camp Wolters, Texas in January 1963.

In February 1954, Jark was transferred to Camp Polk, Louisiana and joined one of these training units, 37th Infantry Division. He was appointed commanding general of Divisional Artillery under Major general Philip DeWitt Ginder and took part in the exercise Flash Burn, atomic maneuvers in North Carolina. Few weeks after that, it was decided that all division's equipment was to be transferred to 10th Infantry Division and 37th Division will be returned under control of Ohio National Guard. Jark moved to Fort Riley, Kansas in late May 1954 and supervised the transition of his staff to 10th Infantry Division. He then assumed duty as commanding general of 10th Infantry Division's Artillery and served in this capacity until the end of August 1954.

He was subsequently transferred to Germany and served in the same capacity with 2nd Armored Division located near Baumholder before transferring to the headquarters of Seventh U.S. Army in Stuttgart. Jark served as commanding general of Sevent Army Artillery unit under general Henry I. Hodes until May 1956 when he was promoted to the temporary rank of Major general and returned to Korea for duty as Commanding General, 7th Infantry Division which was tasked with defense of the Korean Demilitarized Zone.

Upon his return to the United States in September 1957, Jark was assigned to the Office of the Secretary of Defense in Washington, D.C. and served as Deputy U.S. Representative on the Military Committee and Standing Group of NATO until December 1959 when he was transferred to France for duty as Director of J-3 (Operations), U.S. European Command under General Lauris Norstad with headquarters at Camp des Loges near Paris.

Jark was nominated and promoted to the rank of Lieutenant General by President John F. Kennedy on March 1, 1962 and assumed his final duty as Commanding general, Fourth United States Army at Fort Sam Houston, Texas. The Fourth Army area of responsibility was made up of Texas, Arkansas, Louisiana, Oklahoma and New Mexico. His command included III Corps which was half of the Strategic Army Corps (STRAC) which comprised 1st and 2nd Armored Divisions. Beside that his command also included overall command of multiple divisions and Army Posts, that included Army Artillery School at Fort Sill, Oklahoma; White Sands Missile Range; Army Air Defense Center at Fort Bliss; Fort Polk; Fort Chaffee, and Rotary-wing flight training center at Fort Wolters.

He completed 35 years of service and retired on July 31, 1964, receiving Army Distinguished Service Medal during his retirement ceremony. To honor his service, United States Representative from the Texas 20th congressional district Henry B. González read details of Jark's military career into the Congressional Record, closing with:

It is good to know that in times like these, we have men of the skill, caliber and dedication of Carl H. Jark, and I am proud to salute him on his retirement from service.

— Henry B. González, United States Representative from the Texas 20th congressional district

== Personal life ==
Following his retirement from the Army, Jark settled in San Antonio, Texas, but his wife Betty died unexpectedly few days later on August 5, 1964. During his service in San Antonio Jark with his wife befriended lieutenant general Robert W. Burns, Commanding general of the Air Training Command at nearby Randolph Air Force Base and his wife Caroline. General Burns died of Emphysema on September 5, 1964 and Jark and Caroline began dating few months later ultimately marrying in 1965.

They have been married for nineteen years and enjoyed travelling around world, visiting South America, China or Russia. During the last years of his life, Jark struggled with diabetes and cancer and died of heart attack at his home in San Antonio on March 22, 1984, aged 78. Lieutenant general Carl H. Jark was buried alongside his first wife Betty with full military honors at Fort Sam Houston National Cemetery. From his first marriage with Betty, he had one daughter Joanne who later married late Colonel William P. Weikert, USAF, a son of Major general John M. Weikert.

== Decorations ==
Here is lieutenant general Jark's ribbon bar:

1st Row	Silver Star		Legion of Merit with Oak Leaf Cluster	
2nd Row	Bronze Star Medal with Oak Leaf Cluster	Army Commendation Medal with two Oak Leaf Clusters	American Defense Service Medal	American Campaign Medal
3rd Row	Asiatic–Pacific Campaign Medal with two 3/16 inch service star and Arrowhead device	European-African-Middle Eastern Campaign Medal with three 3/16 inch service stars	World War II Victory Medal	Army of Occupation Medal
4th Row	National Defense Service Medal with Oak Leaf Cluster	Korean Service Medal	French Croix de Guerre 1939–1945 with Palm	United Nations Korea Medal

Badges	Army Staff Identification Badge	Secretary of Defense Identification Badge

== See also ==
- Pershing House

Military offices
Preceded by Donald P. Booth	Commanding General, Fourth United States Army; March 1, 1962 – July 31, 1964	Succeeded by Robert W. Colglazier Jr.
Preceded by Ralph J. Butchers	Commanding General, 7th Infantry Division; June 1956 – September 1957	Succeeded by Thomas J. Sands
