= Lawrence Joseph Lincoln =

United States Army general (1909–2000)

Lawrence J. Lincoln
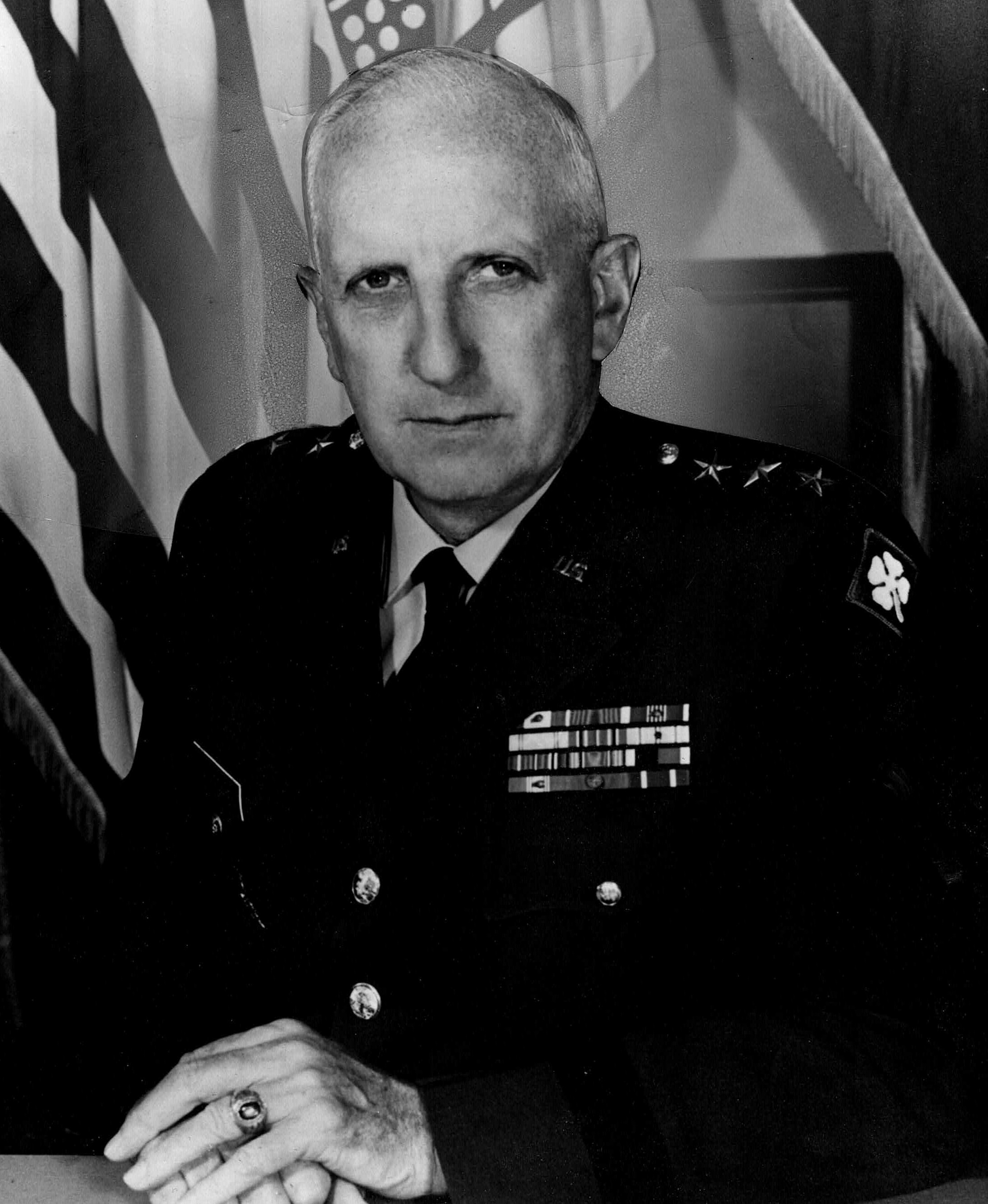
- Born: January 2, 1909; Harbor Beach, Michigan, United States
- Died: June 27, 2000 (aged 91); Alexandria, Virginia, United States
- Burial place: Arlington National Cemetery, Virginia, United States
- Alma mater: United States Military Academy
- Children: 3
- Relatives: George A. Lincoln (brother)
- Military career
- Allegiance: United States
- Branch: United States Army
- Service years: 1933–1968
- Rank: Lieutenant General
- Nickname: Little Abe
- Service number: 0-18968
- Unit: Corps of Engineers
- Commands: Fourth United States Army
- Conflicts: World War II

Lawrence Joseph Lincoln (January 2, 1909 – June 27, 2000) was a native of Harbor Beach, Michigan and lieutenant general in the United States Army. He was commanding officer of Fort Sam Houston for the period June 1967–August 1968.

== Early life and education ==
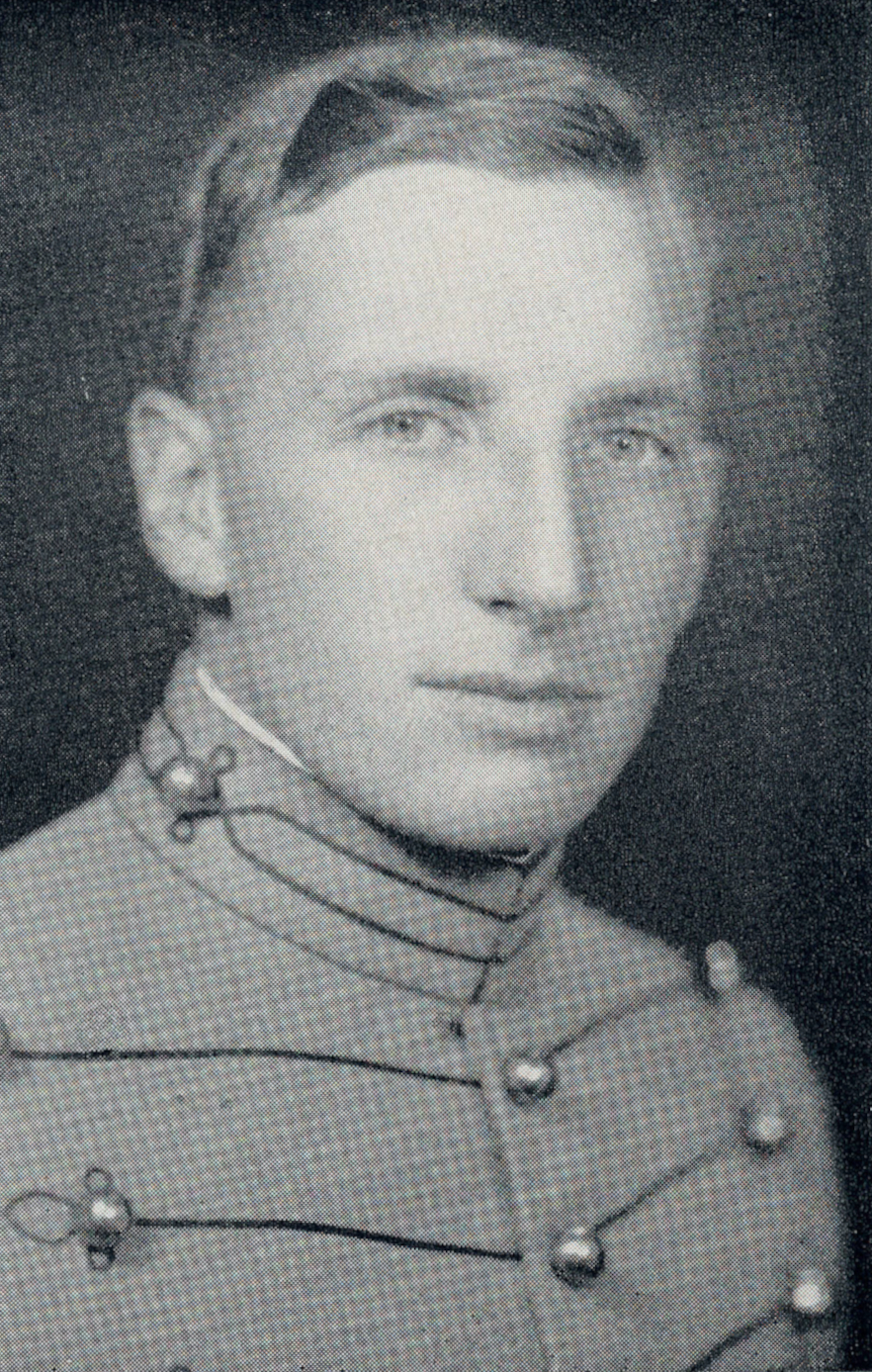
Lincoln as a United States Military Academy cadet c. 1933

Lincoln was born January 2, 1909, on the family farm near Harbor Beach, Michigan. His parents were Burr Buchanan Lincoln and school teacher Esther Elizabeth Hoare Lincoln. He had two sisters and two brothers. A 1926 graduate of Harbor Beach High School, he attended the Ferris Institute, Western State College and George Washington University. His older brother George graduated from United States Military Academy (USMA) in 1929, leaving a vacancy in political appointments to the school. US Congressman Louis C. Cramton appointed Lawrence to the fill the vacancy. In addition to his scholastic achievements, he was athletically inclined.

== Military career ==
After graduating from USMA class of 1933 in the top five percent of his class, Lincoln was commissioned into the United States Army Corps of Engineers. He later studied civil engineering at Princeton University, graduating in 1937. Lincoln then served as an instructor at the USMA from 1938 to 1942.

During WWII, he was on the 1943-44 planning staff of Admiral Lord Louis Mountbatten, Supreme Allied Commander, Southeast Asia Theater. He served on the US–Soviet Joint Commission in 1945, following the end of WWII. Following the end of the war, Lincoln was awarded the Army Distinguished Service Medal for his over-all contributions as part of the War Department General Staff, during World War II. For the next 20 years, Lincoln was assigned to a variety of engineering and construction projects. He graduated from the United States Army War College in 1954. During the 1960s, he was put in command of Fort Belvoir in Fairfax, Virginia, as well as the Engineer Officer Basic Course. Lincoln was awarded an honorary Doctor of Science degree by Ferris State College in 1964. He was promoted to lieutenant general on July 30, 1964. Lincoln was Deputy Chief of Staff for logistics 1964–67. In June 1967, he was named commander of the Fourth United States Army and Fort Sam Houston. In August 1968, Lincoln announced his retirement, and turned command of Fort Sam Houston over to his successor, Lt. General Harry H. Critz.

== Personal life ==
Lincoln and his wife Mary were the parents of one daughter, and two sons who both served in the military. His older brother, Army Brigadier General George Arthur Lincoln (1907–1975), was an aide to General George C. Marshall, and became a top strategist for the Allies during World War II.

In 1955, the Michigan Centennial Farm Program was created to recognize farms that had been family holdings for at least 100 years. The Lincoln family farm was eligible and officially designated the Lincoln Centennial Farm.

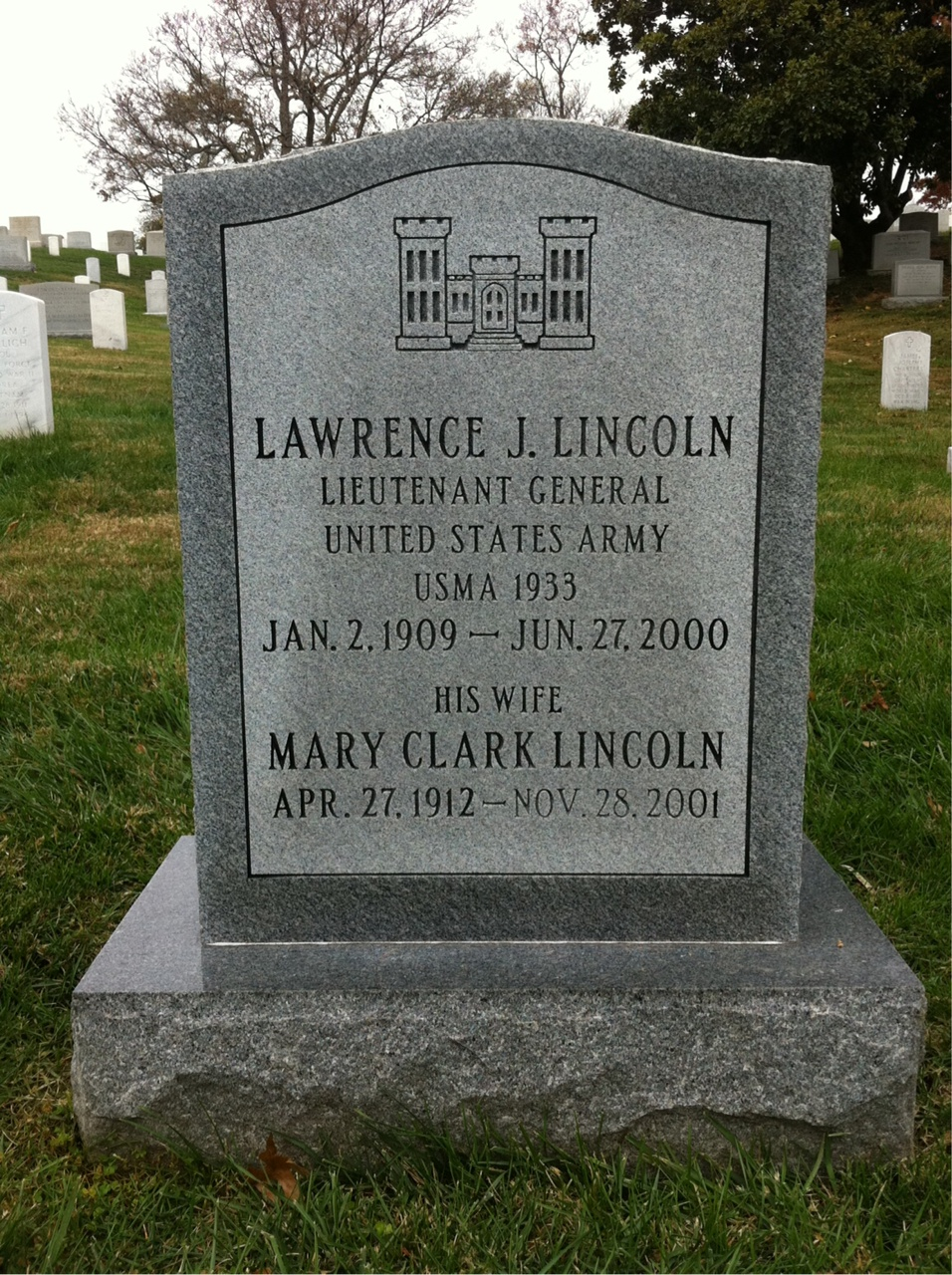
His Gravestone in Arlington Cemetery

After his retirement, Lincoln and his wife Mary settled in Alexandria, Virginia. Following his death from a heart ailment at the Inova Alexandria Hospital in the year 2000, Lincoln was buried with honors at the Arlington National Cemetery. His wife was interred beside him a year later.

== See also ==
- Pershing House
