= Joseph Wilson Duncan =

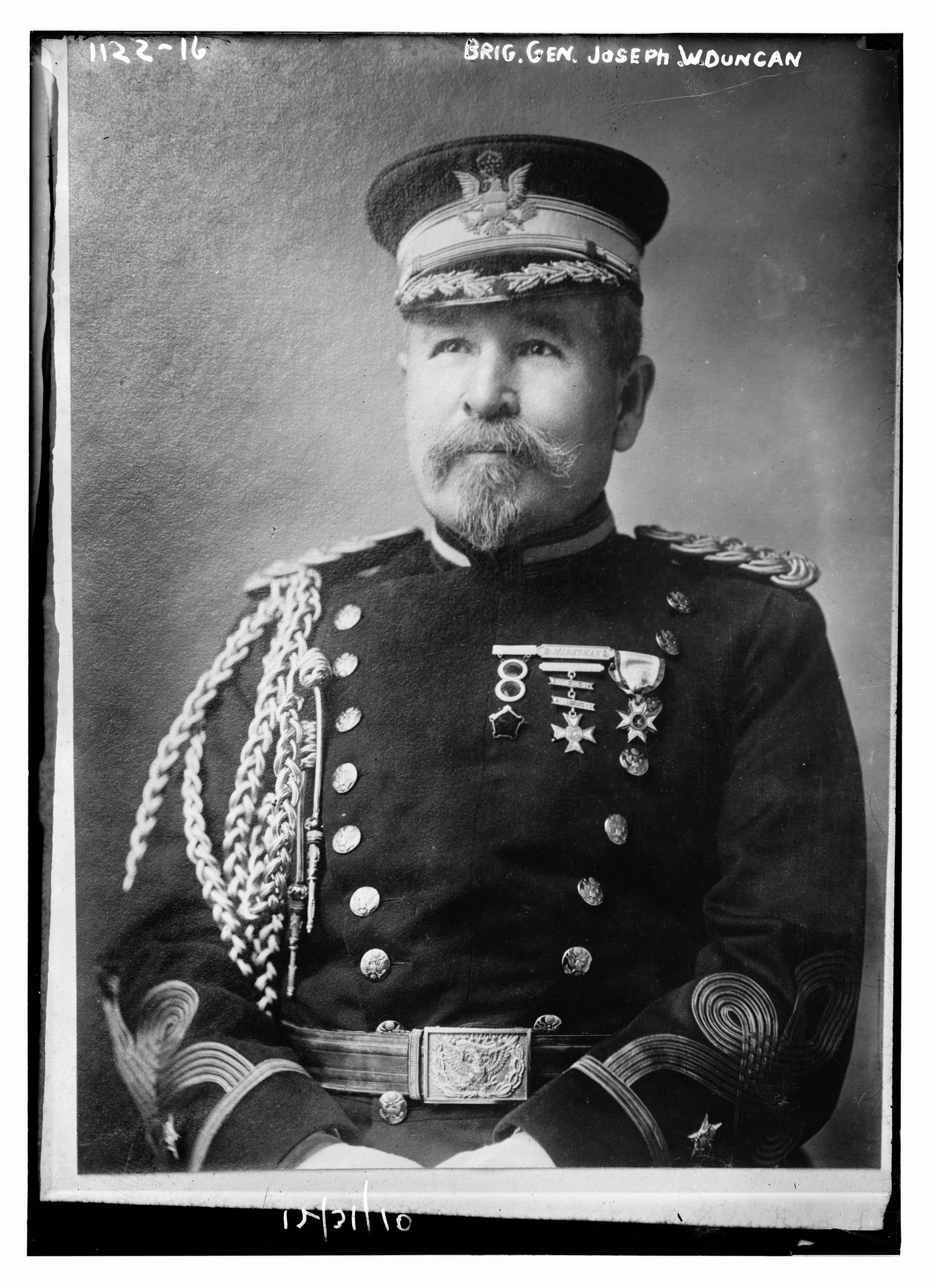
- Born: June 20, 1853; Fort Ewell, La Salle County, Texas, U.S.
- Died: May 14, 1912 (aged 58); Fort Sam Houston, San Antonio, Texas, U.S.
- Burial place: Arlington National Cemetery
- Education: Columbian College
- Military career
- Allegiance: United States
- Branch: United States Army
- Service years: 1878–1912
- Rank: Brigadier general
- Conflicts: American Indian Wars; Battle of the Clearwater; Spanish–American War; Philippine–American War; Moro Rebellion; First Battle of Bud Dajo; Border War

Joseph Wilson Duncan (June 20, 1853 – May 14, 1912) was a United States Army Brigadier General whose final tour of duty was as the 1911–12 commanding officer of Fort Sam Houston, Texas.

== Early life ==
He was born June 20, 1853, to then-Captain and Mrs. Thomas Duncan, a United States Army family stationed at Fort Ewell, in what later became La Salle County, Texas. At the time, the area was part of the Nueces Strip, a contested borderland, inhabited by native Americans and Mexicans. The fort was decommissioned a year after Duncan's birth.

During the American Civil War, his father was the Union army commander of Fort Craig, New Mexico, in charge of the 3rd Cavalry Regiment forces at the Battle of Valverde, New Mexico. The family relocated to Nashville, Tennessee during the Reconstruction era, where young Joseph witnessed the activities of the Ku Klux Klan.

== Education and military service ==
Following his graduation from Columbian College in Washington. D.C. Duncan received an appointment on May 10, 1878, as a Second Lieutenant, 21st U. S. Infantry. His succeeding appointments were: Regimental Adjutant, March 15, 1887, to April 24, 1888, Captain, April 24, 1888, Major, 13th U. S. Infantry, March 2, 1899, Lieutenant Colonel, 13th U. S. Infantry, October 16, 1901, Breveted First Lieutenant, February 27, 1890, for gallant service in action at Battle of the Clearwater against Indians, July 11 and 12, 1877, Second Lieutenant, First Lieutenant, and Captain, Twenty – first Infantry; Major and Lieutenant – Colonel, Thirteenth Infantry; Colonel, Sixth Infantry and General Staff Corps. He also participated in the March 5–8, 1906 First Battle of Bud Dajo.

== Death ==
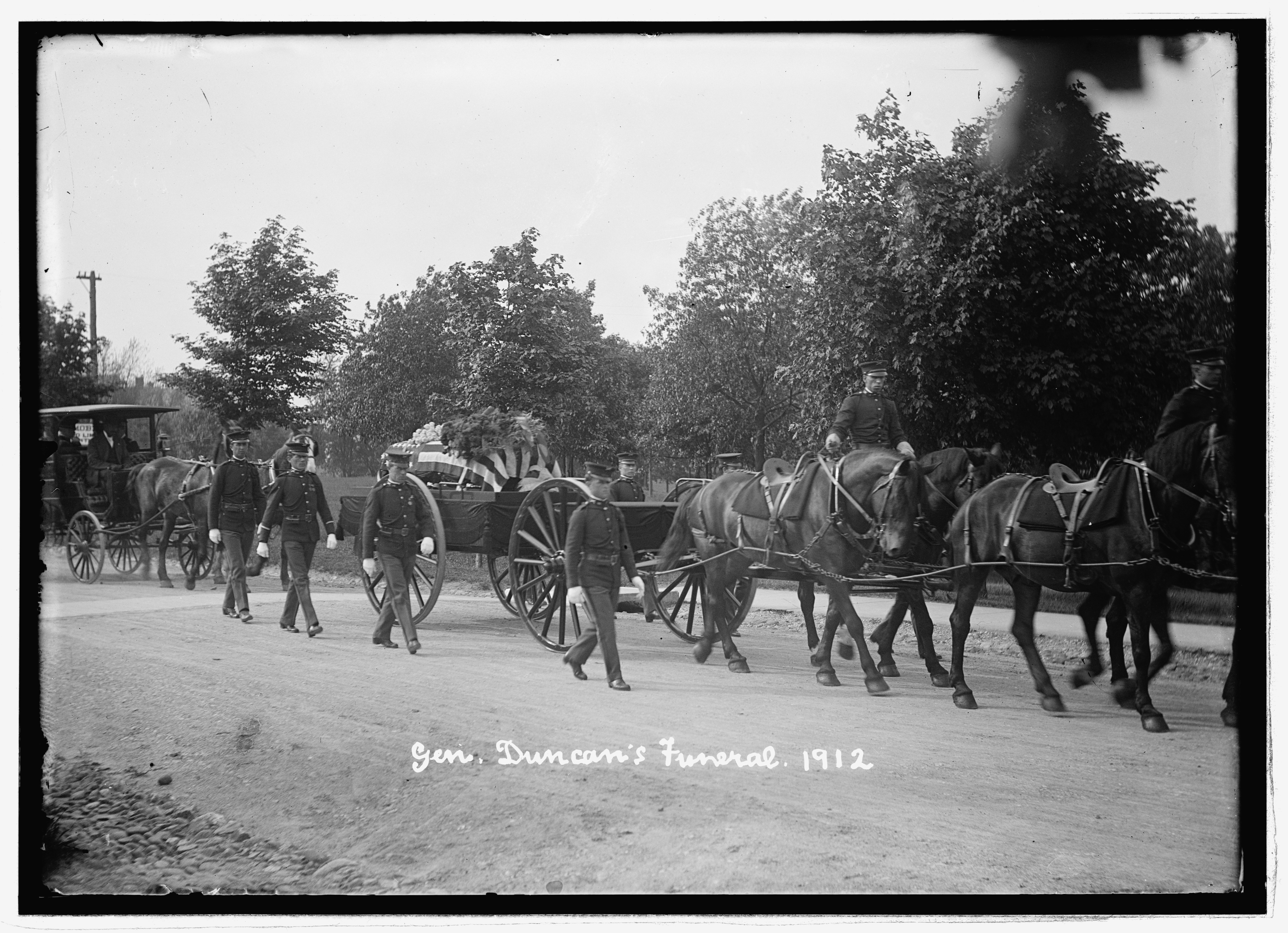
Funeral of Duncan at the Arlington National Cemetery

Duncan was named commanding officer of Fort Sam Houston in 1911, and died there May 14, 1912. He was buried with honors at Arlington National Cemetery.

Fort Sam Houston was temporarily put under the command of Brigadier General Edgar Zell Steever II at Fort Bliss 4th Cavalry Regiment in the El Paso District. Steever reported, "Since Gen. Duncan's death, my time has been completely taken up with conditions along the Mexican border..." Tasker H. Bliss took over as commanding officer of Fort Sam Houston on February 26, 1913.

== See also ==
- Pershing House
