= Pershing House (Fort Bliss) =

- U.S. National Register of Historic Places
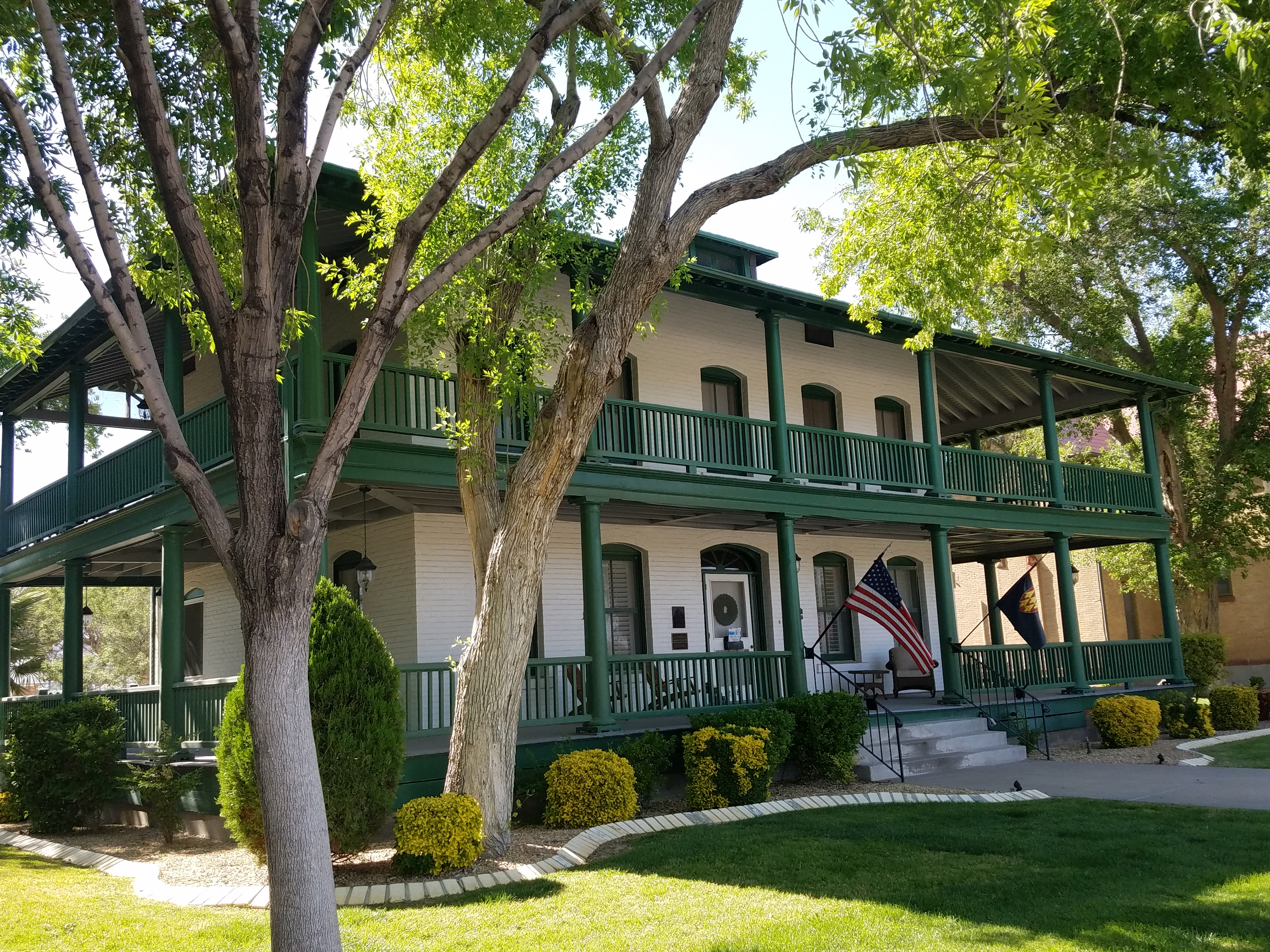
- The Pershing House in 2018
- Location: 228 Sheridan Road; Fort Bliss, Texas
- Coordinates: 31.8084°N 106.4379°W
- Built: 1910
- Architectural style: Classical Revival
- Part of: Fort Bliss Main Post Historic District (ID98000427)
- NRHP reference No.: 87000484
- Added to NRHP: April 9, 1987

The Pershing House, historically known as Quarters Number 1, is a building at 228 Sheridan Road in the Fort Bliss Main Post Historic District at Fort Bliss in El Paso, Texas. It was built in 1910 and added to the National Register of Historic Places in 1987.

== History ==
The Pershing House was built in 1910, and it originally cost $16,378 (equivalent to $565,918 in 2025). It was built according to "plan number 243" from the Quartermaster General's Office, marking some of the earliest usage of standardized building plans at Fort Bliss. This plan gave it an area of 5,874 square feet (545.7 m^{2}).

The house was named after General John J. Pershing, who occupied it from January 1914 to 1916 as the post commander of Fort Bliss during the Mexican Revolution.

In October 1911, the first 48-star flag of the United States was raised in front of the Pershing House to celebrate the pending statehood of New Mexico and Arizona.

In November 1911, electrical power was installed. In July 1928, gas was first used in the house.

Today, the Pershing House contains artifacts, furniture, and documents from the early 20th century when the building was first built and occupied.

=== Notable occupants and guests ===
Since its creation, the house has generally been the residence of the post commander of Fort Bliss. During World War 2, the commander's quarters were relocated and the house held members of the Women's Army Corps. After the war, the house was once again used as the commander's residence.

From 1910 to 1914, the house was occupied by post commander General Edgar Zell Steever II.

The home has hosted a number of notable guests, including Buffalo Bill, Pancho Villa, Mexican General Álvaro Obregón, and former Mexican President General Victoriano Huerta.
