= Persian Gulf Command =

United States Army service command established in 1943

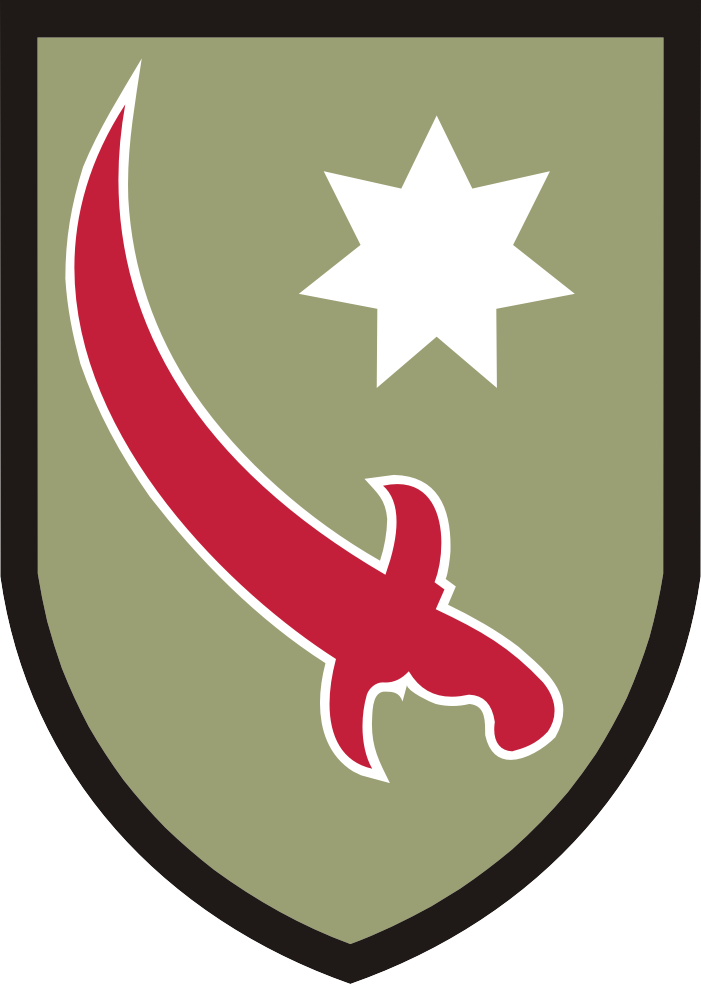
- Active: 27 September 1941–1 June 1945
- Country: United States
- Allegiance: Allied Powers
- Branch: Joint Forces Command

Commanders
- Initial Commander: Col. Raymond A. Wheeler

The Persian Gulf Command (PGC) also known as the Persian Gulf Service Command (PGSC) was a United States Army service command established in December 1943 to facilitate the supply of US lend-lease war material to the Soviet Union, through the "Persian Corridor."

== History ==
The command originated on 27 September 1941, when the US Military Iranian Mission, led by Colonel Raymond A. Wheeler (US Army Corps of Engineers) was established. At this same time, the Iranian District of the North Atlantic Division was set up to provide construction support. By November of 1941, the mission had its headquarters in Bahgdad but moved it to the port city of Basra in March 1942. In August 1942 the mission was re-designated as the Persian Gulf Service Command, and in December 1943 became the Persian Gulf Command. It subsequently came under the command of a succession of engineer generals. Following the War Department's full militarization of construction, the Iranian District ceased to exist in May 1943. Three districts directly subordinate to the area command eventually replaced it. Eventually thousands of personnel worked in Iraq as well.

Iran had been occupied by British and Soviet troops in August-September 1941 during the Anglo-Soviet invasion codenamed Operation Countenance. The two nations were guarding the oil fields and monitoring the pro-German Iranians (Persians). Iran was officially neutral, but it's leader Rezâ Shâh Pahlavi was known to be friendly towards the Axis nations. The Allies would depose Pahlavi and replace him with his son, Mohammad Rezâ Shâh Pahlavi. Adolf Hitler believed that German military forces could eventually take possession of the oil fields and the railroad that went through the mountains from the Persian Gulf to the Russian border.

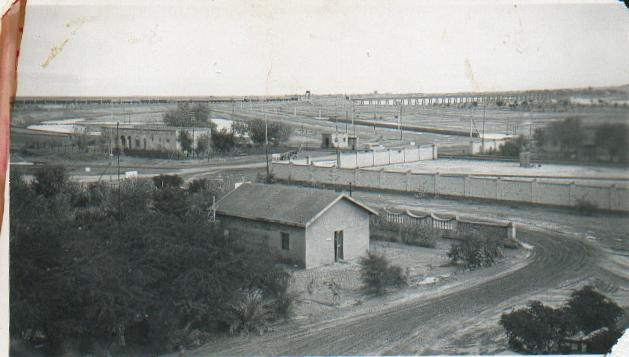
View from a hilltop in Iran, 1942, taken by Charles L. Twitchell, World War II veteran stationed in the Persian Gulf

Conditions in Persia were foreign and inhospitable to the U.S. forces, with hotter temperatures than they had trained for. The War Department did not have maps of Persia and only three employees who spoke the local languages. Those who arrived in the summer of 1942 met with pouring rain and mud more than a foot deep, but had to pitch tents to sleep on the ground for the next six months until huts were built. Temperatures in Iran could rise as high as 170 degrees and dip to as low as zero. Dust and sand storms were a constant issue for the trucks and trains moving across Iran. In the northwest, mountain peaks were as high as 9,000 feet and 7 to 10 feet of snow could block the passes in winter.

Beginning in 1942, bases and medical facilities were built for the huge influx of civilian workers and service members into Iran. Despite the improvement in facilities in 1942 and 1943, morale in the command was low due to the harsh weather and hard work, the troops called themselves the "Forgotten Bastards of Iran."

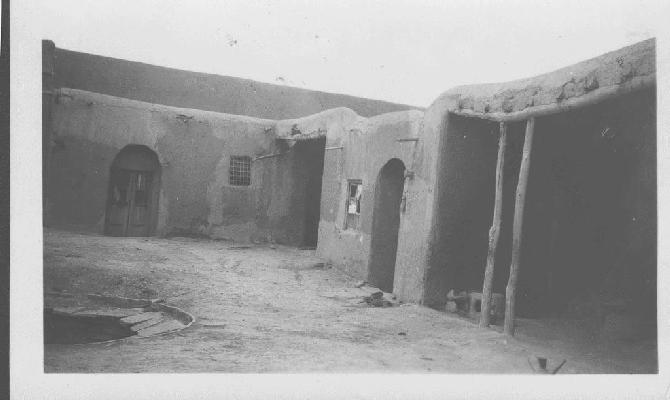
View of the courtyard of a home in Iran, 1942, taken by Charles L. Twitchell, World War II veteran stationed in the Persian Gulf

Between 1942 and 1945, the United States equipped Russia with 192,000 trucks, 5,000 aircraft, combat vehicles, tanks, weapons, ammunition and petroleum products. At the height of the war, there were 65,000 U.S. civilians and 30,000 uniformed service members in the command. Before the construction of the aircraft assembly plant at Abadan, Iran, the United States Army Air Forces flew A-20 medium bombers across the Atlantic to Abadan, where they were turned over to Russian flyers. Army engineers transformed the camel paths into 1,000 miles of all weather roads for trucks and improved the railroad with its more than 200 tunnels so trains could carry tanks and tons of other heavy equipment over the mountains. In total, more than 4 million tons of Lend-Lease material entered the Soviet Union via the Persian corridor, making it a vital contribution to the Soviet war effort.

Army Chief of Staff George C. Marshall declared the PGC mission completed on 1 June 1945. The command had delivered 2.5 million tons of materiel to the Soviet Union worth $11 billion.

== PGC Insignia ==
The PGC shoulder sleeve insignia featured a green shield, 3 1/4 inches high, with a 7 pointed white star above a red scimitar fimbriated in white bendwise, point up.

The red scimitar, from the flag of Iran (or Persia) represented the warlike spirit of the ancient Persians. The white seven pointed star is taken from the flag of the Kingdom of Iraq, and represents purity and the religion of the Middle East. The green color of the shield denotes the agriculture of Persia in antiquity, and also stands for Islam, the religion of both Iran and Iraq. The colors red, green and white are found in the flags of both countries.

The date of the insignia's original approval is not recorded in the Institute of Heraldry files. Correspondence dated 13 May 1944 indicates the insignia drawing may be declassified. The unclassified drawing was approved on 29 August 1944.

== Commanders ==
- Col. Raymond A. Wheeler, September 1941 - August 1942
- Col. Donald Shingler, August 1942 - October 1942.
- Brig. Gen. Donald H. Connolly, 1942–1945.
- Brig. Gen. Donald P. Booth, January 1945 until inactivation.
