= William S. McCaskey =

US Army major general (1843–1914)

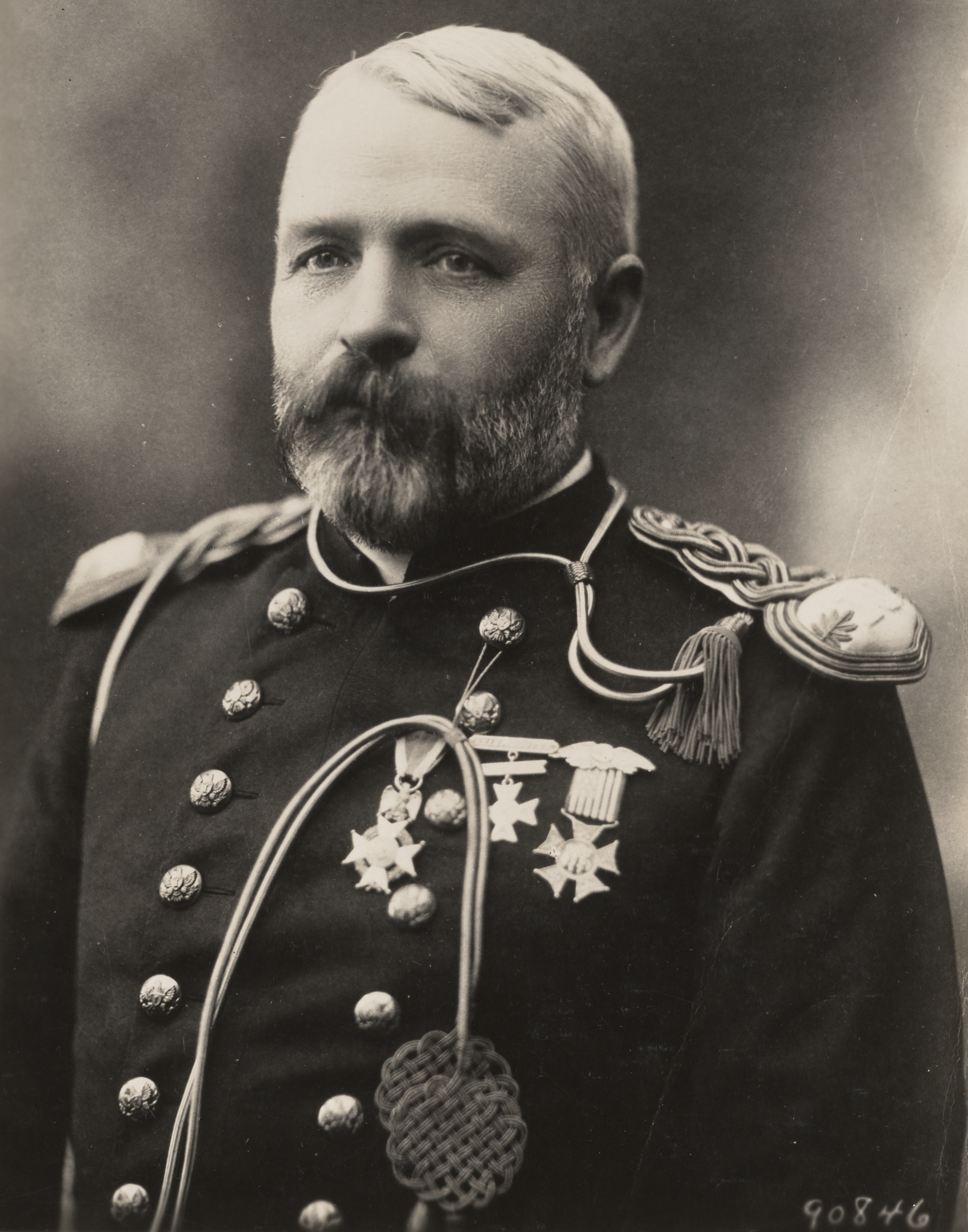
- McCaskey as a lieutenant colonel in 1898
- Born: October 2, 1843; Paradise, Pennsylvania, US
- Died: August 10, 1914 (aged 70); Pacific Grove, California, US
- Burial place: San Francisco National Cemetery
- Alma mater: Eastman Business College (attended)
- Spouse: Eleanor "Nellie" Garrison (m. 1867–1914)
- Children: 6
- Relatives: John Piersol McCaskey (brother)
- Military career
- Allegiance: Union (American Civil War); United States
- Service: Union Army; United States Army
- Service years: 1861–1865 (Union Army); 1866–1907 (US Army)
- Rank: Major General
- Unit: U.S. Army Infantry Branch
- Commands: 20th Infantry Regiment; Department of Texas
- Wars: American Civil War; American Indian Wars; Spanish–American War; Philippine–American War

William Spencer McCaskey (October 2, 1843 – August 10, 1914) was a United States Major general, who served as commanding officer of the Department of Texas and Fort Sam Houston, 1906-1907.

He was born in Lancaster County, Pennsylvania, near the small town of Paradise. As a teenager, he was employed in the town of Lancaster as a printer's apprentice.

At age 17, he enlisted in Company F of the 47th Regiment, Pennsylvania Volunteers during the April 1861 Battle of Fort Sumter, mustering out three months later. He re-enlisted in September. He later joined Company B of the 79th Pennsylvania Infantry Regiment as a First sergeant, participating in combat in Kentucky and Tennessee, and Sherman's March to the Sea in 1864. After mustering out with the rank of Captain in 1865, he attended Eastman Business College of Poughkeepsie, New York. He re-enlisted in 1866, prompted by US Congressman Thaddeus Stevens. During the next 41 years, McCaskey served in many areas of the United States. As Major General, he served as commanding general of the Department of Texas, headquartered at Fort Sam Houston, Texas retiring in 1907. McCaskey Ridge at Leon Springs Military Reservation, Texas, was named in his honor.

McCaskey died in Pacific Grove, California in 1914, and was buried with honors at the San Francisco National Cemetery.

As a captain in the 20th Infantry and serving as the commanding officer of Fort Abraham Lincoln, it was his duty to notify Libbie Custer that "Lt. Col. George Armstrong Custer and every officer and man of five companies of the 7th U.S. Cavalry have been killed in battle at the Little Bighorn River on June 25, 1876."

McCaskey's eldest brother was John Piersol McCaskey a former mayor of Lancaster, and namesake for J.P. McCaskey High School. McCaskey's younger brother Cyrus McCaskey and his brother-in-law Jim Marshall also served with McCaskey during the Civil War.

== See also ==
- Pershing House
