= James R. Hall =

Retired United States Army general

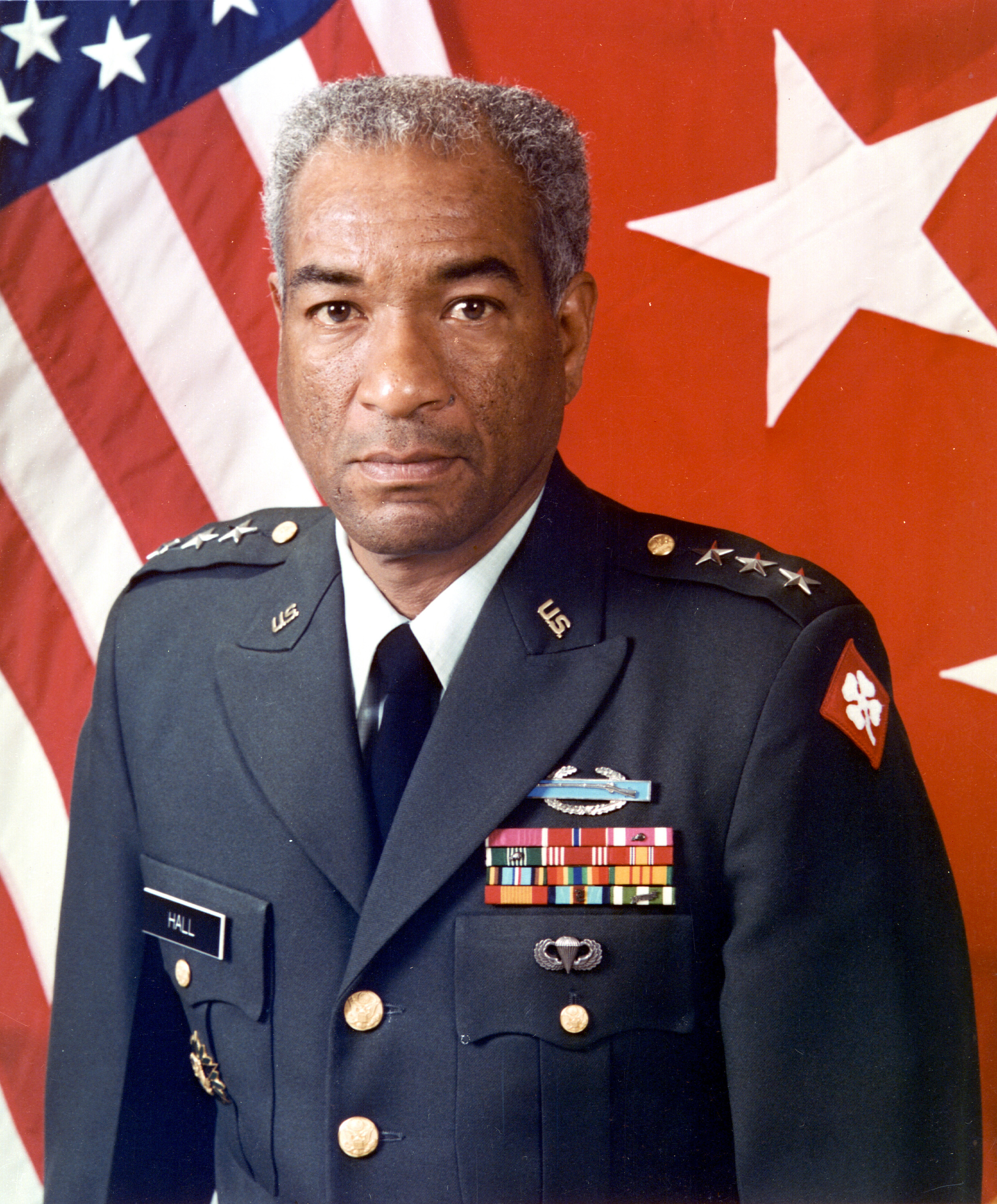
- Hall in 1989
- Born: July 15, 1936 (age 90); Anniston, Alabama, US
- Military career
- Allegiance: United States
- Branch: United States Army
- Service years: 1957–1991
- Rank: Lieutenant General
- Commands: Fourth United States Army; 197th Infantry Brigade
- Conflicts: Vietnam War
- Awards: Legion of Merit; Bronze Star Medal; Defense Meritorious Service Medal (2); Army Commendation Medal (6)

James Reginald Hall Jr. (born July 15, 1936) is a retired senior officer in the United States Army who served as the final commander of the Fourth United States Army before its inactivation in 1991. Prior to serving as commander of the Fourth Army, Hall served as the director of enlisted personnel management at the United States Army Military Personnel Center, the Deputy Inspector General of the Army, and commander of the 197th Infantry Brigade.

== Early life and education ==
Hall was born on July 15, 1936, in Anniston, Alabama, and attended Morehouse College, where he received a Bachelor of Arts degree in political science in 1957. After graduation, Hall enlisted in the United States Army and, after completing basic training, entered officer candidate school. He was commissioned as a second lieutenant in the United States Army on December 19, 1958. Hall also holds an advanced degree in public administration from Shippensburg State College and has attended the Armed Forces Staff College and the United States Army War College. Hall is married to Helen A. Hall (née Kerr) and has three children.

== Military career ==
During his career, Hall served in various roles in the United States Army, including commanding the Fourth United States Army and the 197th Infantry Brigade. He also served as the Director of Enlisted Personnel Management at the United States Army Military Personnel Center, the Deputy Inspector General of the Army, the Secretary of the United States Army Infantry School, the Assistant Deputy Chief of Staff for Operations of United States Army Forces Command, and the Division Commander of the 4th Infantry Division.

Hall's overseas service was exclusively in the Asia-Pacific area. He served two tours of duty in Korea (one as a platoon leader and one as a battalion commander), two tours in Vietnam (one as a company commander and one as a MACV advisor), and one tour on Okinawa.

Hall assumed command of the Fourth United States Army in May 1989, becoming the highest-ranking military officer in the Midwestern United States; he served in this capacity through the inactivation of the Fourth Army in October 1991, when Hall also retired.

== Awards and decorations ==
During his service, Hall has received the Legion of Merit, the Bronze Star Medal, the Defense Meritorious Service Medal (with bronze oak leaf cluster), the Army Commendation Medal (with silver oak leaf cluster), the Combat Infantryman Badge, the Parachutist Badge, and the Army General Staff Identification Badge.

== Retirement ==
After his retirement, Hall served on the Atlanta Committee for the 1996 Centennial Olympic Games and served as the vice president for campus operations at Morehouse College. Hall also serves on Morehouse's board of trustees and as president of Morehouse's national alumni association.
