= Leigh, Nebraska =

- Village
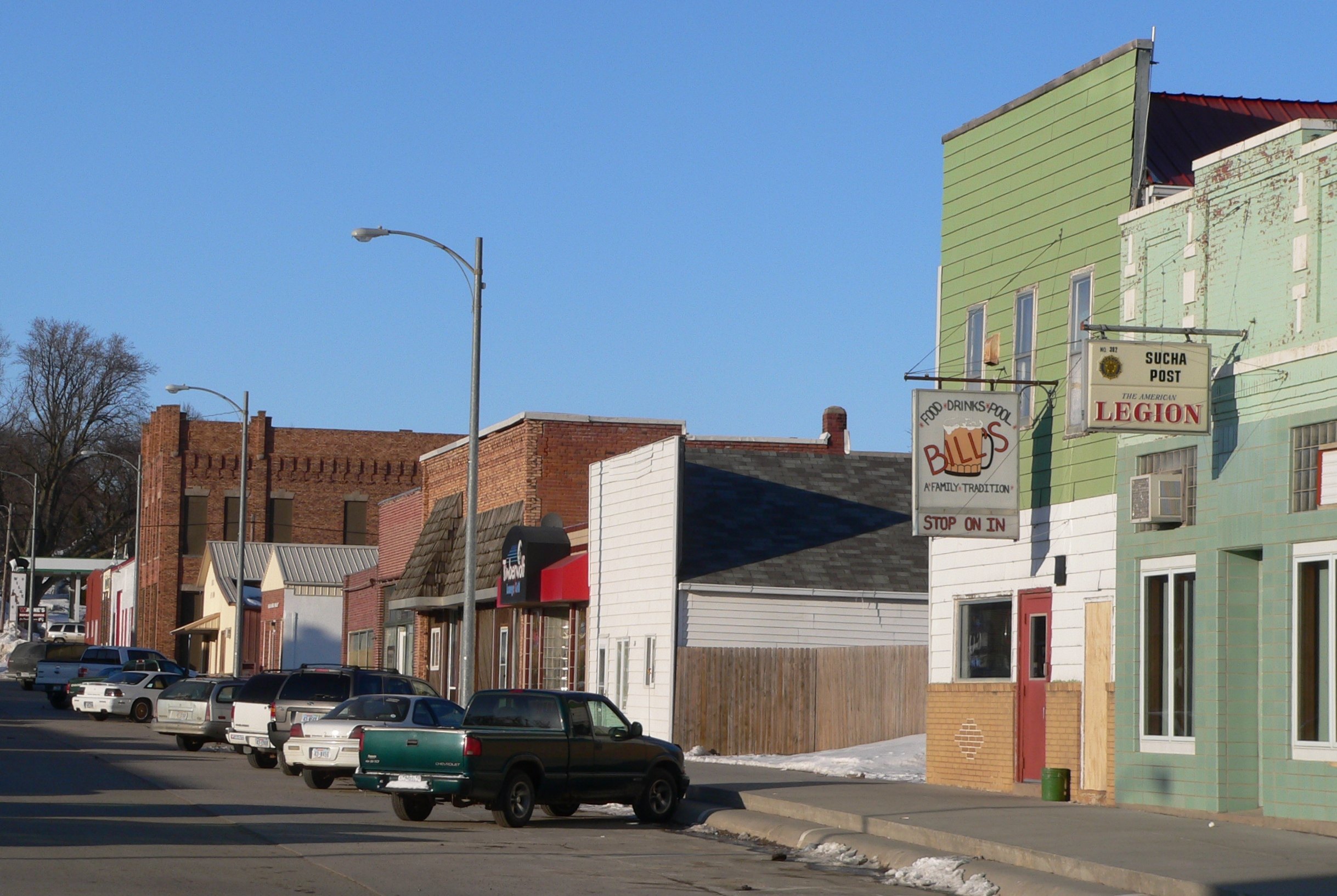
- Downtown Leigh: east side of Main Street

- Location of Leigh, Nebraska
- Coordinates: 41°42′08″N 97°14′24″W
- Country: United States
- State: Nebraska
- County: Colfax

Area
  - Total: 0.61 sq mi (1.58 km^{2})
  - Land: 0.60 sq mi (1.55 km^{2})
  - Water: 0.012 sq mi (0.03 km^{2})
- Elevation: 1,578 ft (481 m)

Population (2020)
  - Total: 435
  - Density: 726.7/sq mi (280.57/km^{2})
- Time zone: UTC-6 (Central (CST))
  - Summer (DST): UTC-5 (CDT)
- ZIP code: 68643
- Area code: 402
- FIPS code: 31-26560
- GNIS feature ID: 2398414
- Website: https://www.cityofleigh.com/

Leigh is a village in Colfax County, Nebraska, United States. As of the 2020 census, Leigh had a population of 435.

== History ==
Leigh was founded in the 1870s. Leigh was the maiden name of the first postmaster's wife. A post office was established at Leigh in 1875. Carl H. Jark (1905–1984), United States Army Lieutenant General, was born in Leigh.

Audrey Stevens Niyogi (1932–2010), an American biochemist best known as a co-discoverer of RNA polymerase was born near Leigh.

== Geography ==
According to the United States Census Bureau, the village has a total area of 0.61 square miles (1.58 km^{2}), of which 0.60 square miles (1.55 km^{2}) is land and 0.01 square miles (0.03 km^{2}) is water.

== Demographics ==
Historical population
Census	Pop.	Note	%±
1880	54		—
1890	249		361.1%
1900	439		76.3%
1910	567		29.2%
1920	516		−9.0%
1930	692		34.1%
1940	575		−16.9%
1950	551		−4.2%
1960	502		−8.9%
1970	501		−0.2%
1980	509		1.6%
1990	447		−12.2%
2000	442		−1.1%
2010	405		−8.4%
2020	435		7.4%
U.S. Decennial Census

=== 2010 census ===
As of the census of 2010, there were 405 people, 193 households, and 112 families residing in the village. The population density was 675.0 inhabitants per square mile (260.6/km^{2}). There were 216 housing units at an average density of 360.0 units per square mile (139.0 units/km^{2}). The racial makeup of the village was 97.0% White, 2.7% from other races, and 0.2% from two or more races. Hispanic or Latino of any race were 3.2% of the population.

There were 193 households, of which 25.4% had children under the age of 18 living with them, 47.2% were married couples living together, 5.7% had a female householder with no husband present, 5.2% had a male householder with no wife present, and 42.0% were non-families. 37.3% of all households were made up of individuals, and 23.8% had someone living alone who was 65 years of age or older. The average household size was 2.10 and the average family size was 2.71.

The median age in the village was 43.9 years. 20.5% of residents were under the age of 18; 8.2% were between the ages of 18 and 24; 23.5% were from 25 to 44; 23.8% were from 45 to 64; and 24.2% were 65 years of age or older. The gender makeup of the village was 49.6% male and 50.4% female.

=== 2000 census ===
As of the census of 2000, there were 442 people, 190 households, and 118 families residing in the village. The population density was 732.3 inhabitants per square mile (282.7/km^{2}). There were 212 housing units at an average density of 351.3 units per square mile (135.6 units/km^{2}). The racial makeup of the village was 99.55% White, and 0.45% from two or more races. Hispanic or Latino of any race were 1.81% of the population.

There were 190 households, out of which 30.5% had children under the age of 18 living with them, 54.7% were married couples living together, 5.8% had a female householder with no husband present, and 37.4% were non-families. 36.3% of all households were made up of individuals, and 25.8% had someone living alone who was 65 years of age or older. The average household size was 2.32 and the average family size was 3.06.

In the village, the population was spread out, with 26.9% under the age of 18, 5.0% from 18 to 24, 22.2% from 25 to 44, 20.1% from 45 to 64, and 25.8% who were 65 years of age or older. The median age was 42 years. For every 100 females, there were 93.9 males. For every 100 females age 18 and over, there were 77.5 males.

As of 2000 the median income for a household in the village was $31,458, and the median income for a family was $40,481. Males had a median income of $31,563 versus $17,143 for females. The per capita income for the village was $17,423. About 4.5% of families and 6.0% of the population were below the poverty line, including 0.9% of those under age 18 and 8.5% of those age 65 or over.

== See also ==
- List of municipalities in Nebraska
