= Fourth United States Army =

Military unit

- Fourth United States Army shoulder sleeve insignia
- Active: 9 August 1932–30 June 1971; 1 October 1984–30 September 1991
- Country: United States of America
- Branch: United States Army
- Type: Field army
- Motto: "Leadership And Integrity"

Commanders
- Notable commanders: Alexander Patch; Jonathan Wainwright; James R. Hall; Samuel Tankersley Williams

Insignia
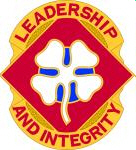
- Distinctive unit insignia

- Flag

Fourth United States Army was a field army of the United States Army between 1932 and 1991.

== History ==
=== Interwar period ===
==== Fourth Army (I) ====
The Fourth Army was authorized by the National Defense Act of 1920 and was originally to be composed of Organized Reserve units primarily from the First, Second, and Third Corps Areas. The Headquarters and Headquarters Company were constituted in the Organized Reserve on 15 October 1921 and allotted to the Second Corps Area. New York City, New York, was designated as headquarters upon organization, but the unit was never organized at that location. The Headquarters Company was initiated in December 1922 at New York City. The Headquarters Company was withdrawn from the Organized Reserve on 18 August 1933 and allotted to the Regular Army effective 1 October 1933. Concurrently, the army headquarters was demobilized.

==== Fourth Army (II) ====
The second iteration of the headquarters, Fourth Army, was constituted in the Regular Army on 9 August 1932 and allotted to the Seventh Corps Area. The headquarters was organized on 15 August 1932 at Omaha, Nebraska. The Headquarters Company (constituted in the Organized Reserve on 15 October 1921) was withdrawn from the Organized Reserve 18 August 1933, and allotted to the Regular Army effective 1 October 1933.

Due to the abandonment in 1933 of the “Six Army” plan in favor of the “Four Army” plan, the Fourth Army area was restructured to consist of the Seventh and Ninth Corps Areas. The army headquarters was transferred to the Presidio of San Francisco on 3 October 1933 upon the assumption of command of Major General Malin Craig, the senior corps area commander. The Fourth Army mission was to develop defense and operational plans for contingencies in the vicinity of the Pacific coast and the western United States, review the mobilization plans of the Seventh and Ninth Corps Areas, and oversee the training of units in the army area. As part of the responsibility to oversee training, the Fourth Army planned, conducted, and/or participated in three major maneuvers between 1937 and 1941.

The 1937 maneuvers, under the command of Major General George S. Simonds, were actually four separate exercises and were held at Fort Riley, Kansas, and Camp Ripley, Minnesota, for the Seventh Corps Area troops, and at Camp San Luis Obispo, California, and Fort Lewis, Washington, for the Ninth Corps Area troops. The next Fourth Army maneuver was also a split exercise, this time under the command of Lieutenant General John L. DeWitt. Held in August 1940, the maneuver was conducted near Camp Ripley for the Seventh Corps Area units and at Fort Lewis for the Ninth Corps Area contingent. A primary focus of this exercise was to train the army and corps staffs, all of which had been provisionally organized from the corps area staffs. Following the 1940 maneuver, the organization of the Fourth Army was changed to reflect the assignment of the III Corps to the troop list and the loss of the VII Corps to the Second Army. The Fourth Army Headquarters Company was activated on 18 November 1940 at the Presidio of San Francisco. The final maneuver in which the Fourth Army participated prior to World War II was the GHQ Fourth Army maneuvers in southwestern Washington in August and September 1941. The exercise included over 120,000 Fourth Army soldiers from Regular Army and National Guard units. Following the maneuvers, the Fourth Army headquarters returned to its station at the Presidio of San Francisco, where it was located on 7 December 1941.

=== World War II ===
Fourth Army remained in the continental United States during World War II, largely responsible for the defense of the West Coast and training tactical units to operate efficiently in combat.

In 1946-47 the Eighth Service Command at Fort Sam Houston, Texas, was upgraded into the Fourth Army.

=== Cold War ===
During the 1960s, Fourth Army operated "Tigerland", an infantry training school at Louisiana's Fort Polk that prepared recruits for infantry combat in Vietnam. VIII Corps supervised Reserve training within the Army's area, 1958-1968. In July 1971, Fourth Army was consolidated with Fifth United States Army at Fort Sam Houston.

Between 1984 and 1991, Fourth Army was based at Fort Sheridan, Illinois.

By this time, Army Reserve units were divided into Armies, and each Army controlled several Army Reserve Commands, or ARCOMs, for a total of 20. The 83rd, 86th, and 88th ARCOMS were under Fourth Army, located at Fort Sheridan.

Lieutenant General James R. Hall served as the last commanding general, holding the position from 1989 until Fourth Army was inactivated in 1991.

== Past commanders ==
- MG Johnson Hagood (1932–1933)
- MG Malin Craig (1933–1935)
- MG Paul B. Malone (1935–1936)
- MG George S. Simonds (1936–1938)
- LTG Albert Jesse Bowley Sr. (1938–1939)
- GEN John L. DeWitt (1939–1943)
- GEN William Hood Simpson (1943–1944)
- MG John P. Lucas (1944–1945)
- LTG Alexander Patch (1945)
- GEN Jonathan Mayhew Wainwright IV (1946–1947)
- GEN Thomas Troy Handy (1947–1949)
- MG Andrew D. Bruce (1949)
- LTG LeRoy Lutes (1949–1952)
- MG Hobart R. Gay (1952)
- GEN William M. Hoge (1952–1953)
- GEN John E. Dahlquist (1953)
- MG Haydon L. Boatner (1953)
- LTG Isaac D. White (1953–1955)
- LTG Samuel Tankersley Williams (1955)
- LTG John H. Collier (1955–1958)
- LTG Guy S. Meloy Jr. (1958–1961)
- LTG Donald Prentice Booth (1961–1962)
- LTG Carl H. Jark (1962–1964)
- LTG Robert W. Colglazier (1964–1966)
- LTG Thomas W. Dunn (1966–1967)
- LTG Lawrence J. Lincoln (1967–1968)
- LTG Harry H. Critz (1968–1971)
- LTG George G. O'Connor (1971) (Note: O'Connor suffered a heart attack and died in March 1971, approximately three weeks after assuming command.)
- LTG George V. Underwood Jr. (1971) (Note: Fourth Army merged with Fifth Army in 1971; Underwood assumed command of the reorganized Fifth Army)
- Unit inactive
- LTG Edward C. Peter II (1984–1986)
- LTG Frederic J. Brown III (1986–1989)
- LTG James R. Hall (1989–1991)
- Unit inactive

== General references ==
- History of the Fourth Army, Jack B. Beardwood, Washington, D.C., 1946 (N.P. Army Ground Force Study No. 18)
