= Harry H. Critz =

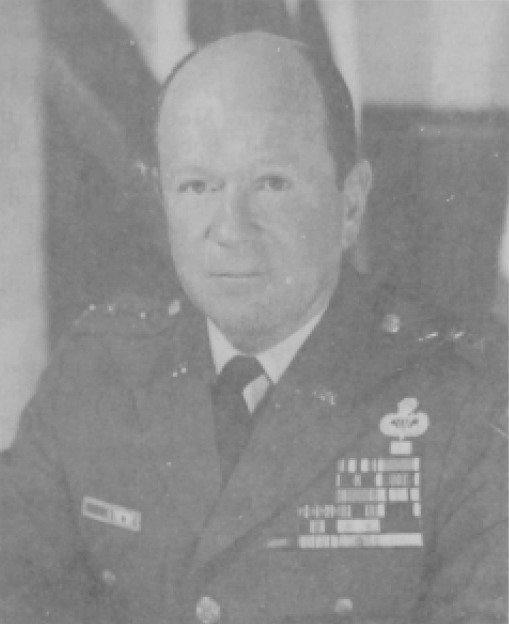
Lt. Gen. Harry H. Critz

Lieutenant General Harry Herndon Critz (26 February 1912 – 2 May 1982) was a native Texan, born in Teague. Rising through the ranks during periods of war, his final post was as Commanding General of Fort Sam Houston, in San Antonio, Texas.

While studying civil engineering at Texas A&M University for a year, he was named the 1934 Flag Officer of the school. Critz then enrolled at the United States Military Academy at West Point, New York, receiving a B.S. degree and commissioning there in 1935. With the United States 1941 entry into World War II, Critz was attached to the 1st Field Artillery Regiment, seeing action in the North African campaign.

He saw service in Europe until 1948, when he was stationed at Fort Sill, assigned to the 32nd Field Artillery Battalion, eventually rising to the position of Division Artillery Commander. He graduated from the United States Army War College in 1951 and served as an instructor there. During the Korean War in 1953 and 1954, he was Commander of the United States Field Artillery Branch. Following the 1953 armistice of the Korean War, he served as chief of staff, 8th U.S. Army in Washington D.C. During the Vietnam War, he received briefings from the field. In 1968, Lt. General Critz was named Commanding General of the 4th U.S. Army and Fort Sam Houston, in San Antonio, Texas, a position he held until his 1971 retirement from the military.

Upon his retirement from military service, Critz and his wife returned to Fort Sill, Oklahoma, living in Lawton. He became president of Fort Sill National Bank. In 1982, Critz died in the Reynolds Army Hospital at Fort Sill and was buried in Fort Sill Post Cemetery on 5 May 1982.

== Military awards ==
The following are military awards received by Critz.

- Army Distinguished Service Medal
- Silver Star
- Bronze Star with Oak Leaf Cluster
- Legion of Merit with Oak Leaf Cluster
- Army Commendation Medal with Oak Leaf Cluster
- Presidential Unit Citation
- French Legion of Honor
- French Croix de Guerre

== See also ==
- Pershing House
