= Guy S. Meloy Jr. =

United States Army general (1903–1968)

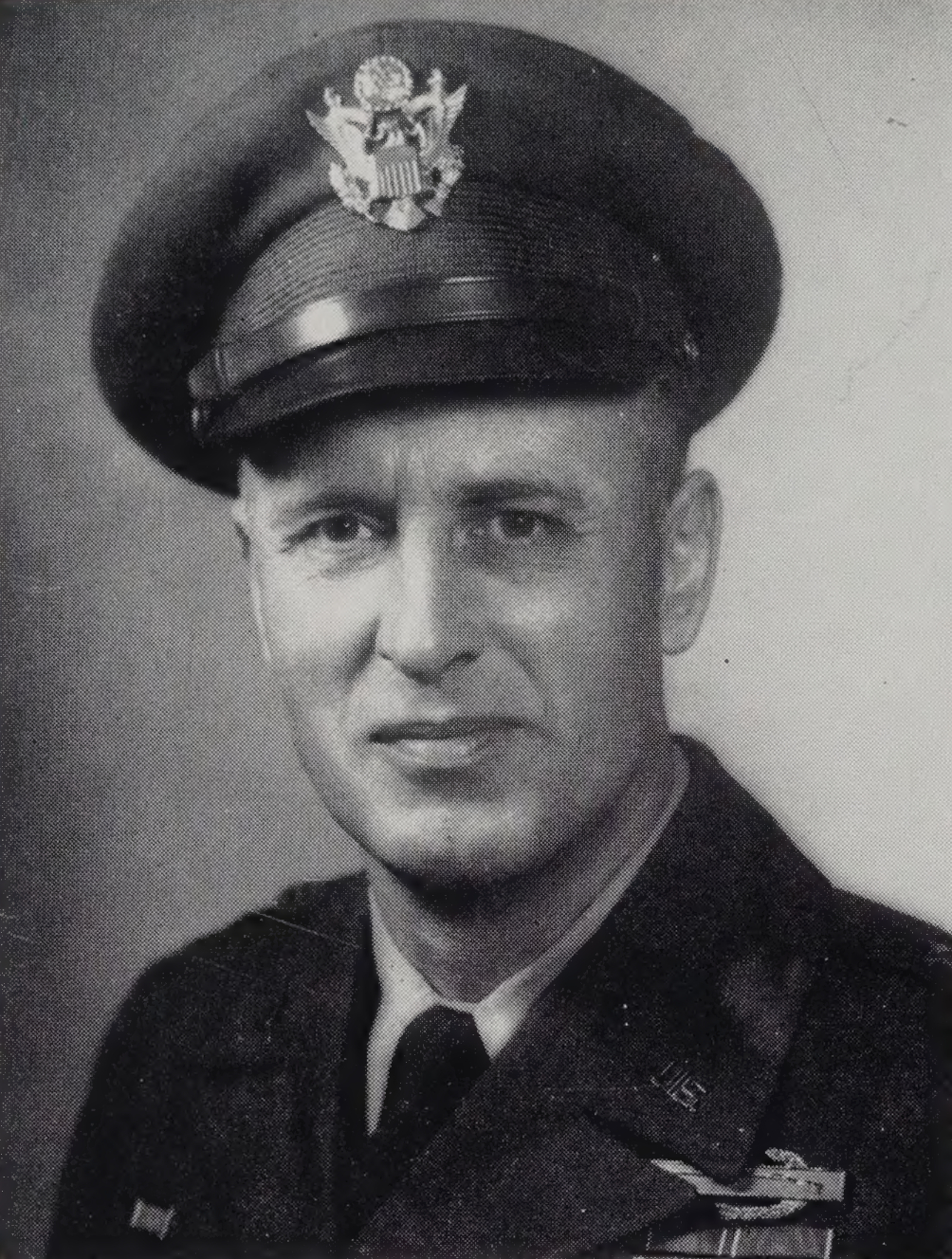
- Meloy Jr. as commanding general of the US Army Infantry School c. 1952
- Born: 4 September 1903; Lanham, Maryland, U.S.
- Died: 14 December 1968 (aged 65); San Antonio, Texas, U.S.
- Burial place: Arlington National Cemetery
- Spouse: Therese Susan Graves (m. 1960)
- Military career
- Allegiance: United States
- Branch: United States Army
- Service years: 1927–1963
- Rank: General
- Unit: Infantry Branch
- Commands: United Nations Command; Fourth Army; VII Corps; 1st Infantry Division; Army Infantry School; 19th Infantry Regiment
- Conflicts: World War II; Korean War
- Awards: Distinguished Service Cross; Distinguished Service Medal; Legion of Merit; Bronze Star; Purple Heart; Army Commendation Medal; Combat Infantryman Badge
- Other work: Mayor of Terrell Hills, Texas

General Guy Stanley Meloy Jr. (4 September 1903 – 14 December 1968) was a U.S. Army general, World War II and Korean War veteran, and served as commander of all U.S. forces during the Korean War.

== Early life and education ==
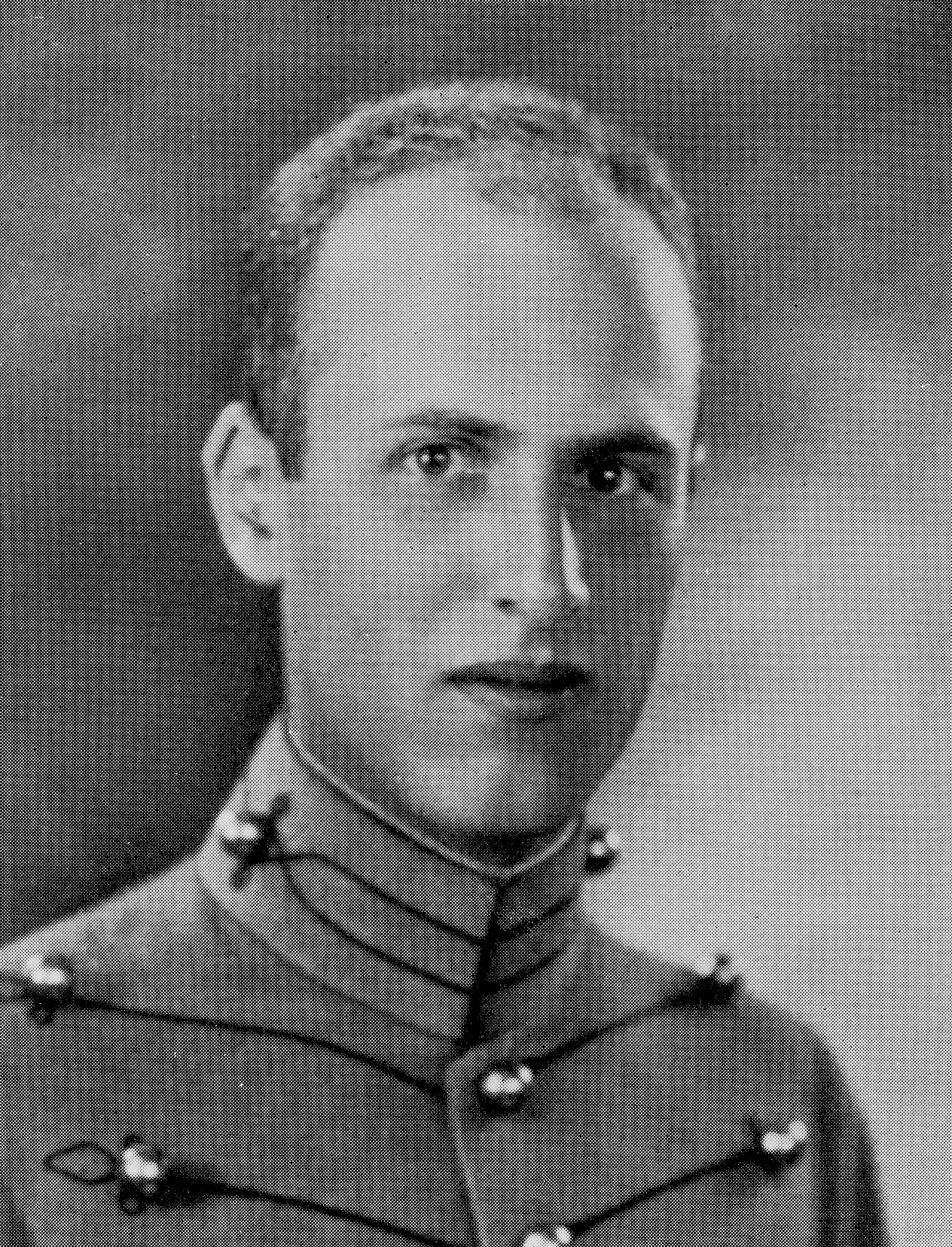
At West Point in 1927

Meloy was born in Lanham, Maryland on 4 September 1903. After graduating from McKinley Technology High School in Washington, D.C., he was appointed to the United States Military Academy. He graduated from West Point in 1927 with a Bachelor of Science degree and was commissioned as a second lieutenant in the infantry.

== Career ==
One of his early assignments was with the first tank destroyer battalion to be organized in the United States Army. He followed this assignment by attending the British Army's anti-tank school, and upon his return to the U.S. was assigned to Camp Hood (later Fort Hood) as one of the first five officers at the now defunct Tank Destroyer Center. During World War II he served in Europe as chief of staff of the 103rd Infantry Division, and was chief of staff of the Airborne Center at Fort Bragg, North Carolina.

=== 1940s ===
From 1946 to 1948 he was professor of military science and tactics at Texas A&M University. He next served as commander of the 19th Infantry Regiment of the 24th Infantry Division at Camp Chickamauga in Beppu, Kyushu, Japan.

=== 1950s ===
He deployed to the Korean War, where he was seriously wounded in action while serving as the Commanding Officer, 19th Infantry Regiment, 24th Infantry Division on 16 July 1950. This occurred during the action that resulted in him receiving the Distinguished Service Cross. Later he commanded the United States Army Infantry School at Fort Benning, and the 1st Infantry Division in Europe, where he oversaw the unit's redeployment to Fort Riley. He was the Chief of Public Information at the Department of the Army and later commanded Fourth United States Army at Fort Sam Houston in 1958 and then served as the commander of VII Corps in Europe.

=== 1960s ===
He received his fourth star in 1961 and became the commander-in-chief of the United Nations Command, Korea, commander United States Forces Korea, commanding general of Eighth United States Army and commanding general of the Seventh United States Army, headquartered at Stuttgart in West Germany.

== Personal life ==
On 16 November 1960, he married Therese Susan Graves (née Fischer), from San Antonio, Texas.

== Later life and death ==
He retired at the age of 60 in 1963, and died on 14 December 1968. He is buried with his first wife Catherine, who preceded him in death in 1959, in Arlington National Cemetery.

In retirement, he served as mayor of Terrell Hills, Texas, and was active in the San Antonio chapter of the Association of the United States Army, which established a scholarship in his name in 1970. His son, Guy S. Meloy III, retired from the U.S. Army as a major general.

== Awards ==
Meloy's awards included the Combat Infantryman Badge, Distinguished Service Cross, Distinguished Service Medal, Legion of Merit, Bronze Star Medal, Purple Heart, and Army Commendation Medal
