= Thomas W. Dunn =

United States Army general (1908–1983)

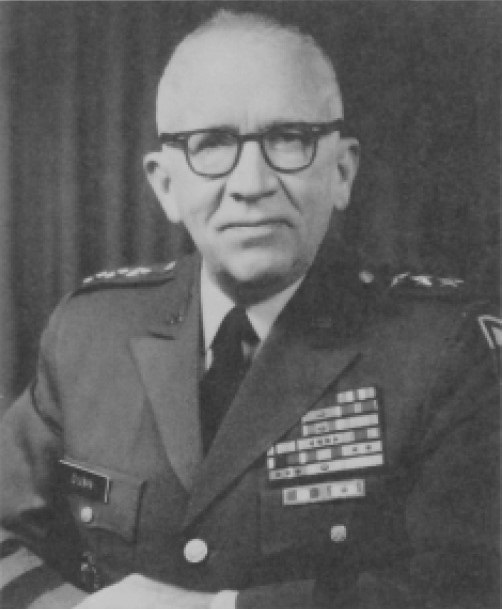
- Born: September 12, 1908; Fort Worth, Texas
- Died: January 19, 1983 (aged 74); San Antonio, Texas
- Military career
- Allegiance: United States
- Branch: United States Army
- Service years: 1930–1967
- Rank: Lieutenant General
- Commands: Fourth United States Army; First United States Army; III Corps; United States Army War College; I Corps Artillery; 40th Infantry Division Artillery
- Conflicts: World War II; Korean War
- Awards: Army Distinguished Service Medal; Silver Star; Legion of Merit (2); Bronze Star Medal

Lieutenant General Thomas Weldon Dunn (September 12, 1908 – January 19, 1983) was a senior officer in the United States Army.

== Early life ==
Dunn was born in Fort Worth, Texas, on September 12, 1908. On graduation from high school, he entered the United States Military Academy at West Point.

== Military career ==
Upon graduation from West Point in 1930, Dunn was commissioned a second lieutenant and assigned to the 12th Field Artillery at Fort Sam Houston, Texas.

Dunn left Fort Sam Houston in August 1933 to attend the Battery Officers Course at the Field Artillery School, Fort Sill, Oklahoma. He completed the course in 1934 and joined the 11th Field Artillery Regiment at Schofield Barracks, Hawaii. He returned to the mainland in December 1936 and was assigned to the 17th Field Artillery at Fort Bragg, North Carolina Three years later he became a gunnery instructor in the Field Artillery School and in July 1941 was named a gunnery instructor in the Officer Candidate School there.

In December 1942 Dunn was transferred to Brisbane, Australia to be Chief Branch Instructor in the Officer Candidate School for United States Forces, Southwest Pacific Area. He became assistant director of Training at the school in June 1943 and Director of Training in November 1943. In April 1944 he was designated Assistant Artillery Officer, Headquarter, Sixth United States Army and served in that position, in combat, in New Guinea, Leyte, and Luzon. He was also with the initial occupation forces in Japan.

Dunn returned to the Field Artillery School in February 1946 as assistant director of Gunnery. In July 1947 he was transferred to the Command and General Staff College at Fort Leavenworth, Kansas, where he became an instructor in the Department of Analysis and Research. In 1949 he attended the National War College in Washington, D.C. from which he graduated in 1950 to become a member of the Policy, Training, and Organization Section of the Joint Strategic Plans Group, Office of the Joint Chiefs of Staff. In July 1951 he was appointed assistant to the Director of the Joint Staff.

In February 1953 Dunn was named Division Artillery Commander of the 40th Infantry Division in Korea and later as Commanding General of I Corps Artillery.

Upon his return from Korea in February 1954 Dunn became Chief of the Organization and Training Division in the Office of the Assistant Chief of Staff, G-3, Department of the Army. In August 1954 he was appointed Deputy Commandant, Army War College, Carlisle Barracks, Pennsylvania. He served as Acting Commandant for a brief period. He was transferred from there in July 1956 and named Commanding General, United States Army Training Center (Field Artillery), Fort Chaffee, Arkansas.

In January 1958 heDunnwas assigned to Paris, France, where he was named Assistant Chief of Staff, Programs, Supreme Headquarters, Allied Powers Europe (SHAPE). He returned to the United States in August 1960 and was named the Commandant of the United States Army War College.

In March 1962, he was designated Commanding General, III Corps (STRAC) and took command of the Corps and Fort Hood, Texas. The two headquarters were integrated in April 1962 as Headquarters III Corps and Fort Hood at the recommendation of Dunn. In December 1963 he assumed command of I Corps (Group) in Korea. In March 1965 Dunn was assigned as Commanding General, First United States Army and Senior United States Army Representative to the United Nations Military Staff Committee. Dunn was the last commanding general of First United States Army while it was headquartered at Fort Jay, Governors Island, New York.

With the consolidation of Second United States Army into First Army at Fort Meade, Maryland in January 1966, Dunn was assigned the post of commanding general of Fourth United States Army at Fort Sam Houston, Texas. While there one of his aides, Major Richard H. Pearce defected with his 5-year-old son to Cuba in May 1967. Pearce flew from Key West, Florida, on what was a short pleasure flight and landed in Cuba, requesting asylum, publicly stating he could no longer live in the United States. Pearce was on leave at the time, had concluded a divorce and was experiencing custody problems. Pearce returned to the United States on his own accord in November 1979. He pleaded guilty at a court-martial in 1980 and was sentenced to one year. The sentence was dismissed, but he forfeited $200,000 in pay and allowances and was dismissed from the army.

Dunn retired from active duty on June 30, 1967. He was awarded the Army Distinguished Service Medal, Silver Star, Legion of Merit with oak leaf cluster, Bronze Star Medal, Army Commendation Medal, Presidential Unit Citation (Philippines), and Presidential Unit Citation (Korea).

Dunn and his wife Caroline Wade "Curly" (Kennington) Dunn (October 29, 1912 – August 30, 1987) settled in San Antonio, Texas, after his retirement. He died there on January 19, 1983, and was buried at the West Point Cemetery.
