= Robert Wesley Colglazier Jr. =

United States Army general

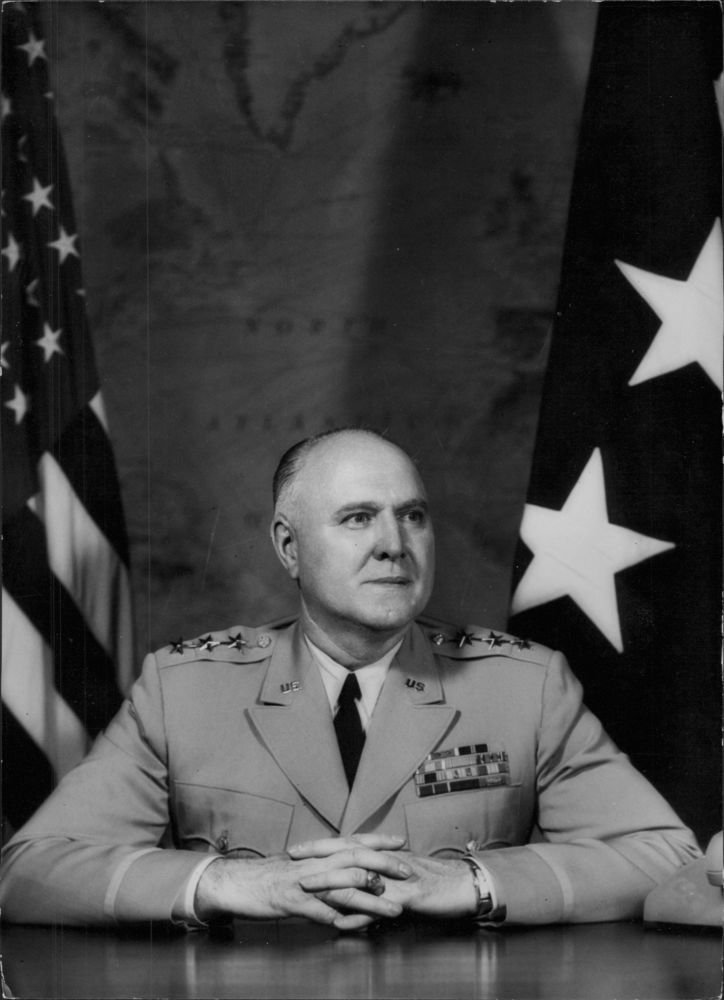
- Colglazier in 1960
- Born: 18 October 1904; St. Louis, Missouri
- Died: 23 January 1993 (aged 88); San Antonio, Texas
- Burial place: Fort Sam Houston National Cemetery
- Military career
- Allegiance: United States of America
- Branch: United States Army
- Service years: 1925-1966
- Rank: Lieutenant General
- Commands: U.S. Army Europe Communications Zone; Fourth United States Army
- Conflicts: World War II; Korean War; Vietnam War
- Awards: Distinguished Service Medal; Legion of Merit; Bronze Star Medal; Army Commendation Medal; Order of the British Empire; French Legion of Honor; French Croix de Guerre
- Other work: President, Colglazier Construction Company, Councilman-At-Large, Texas A&M University Association of Former Students

Robert Wesley Colglazier Jr. (18 October 1904 – 23 January 1993) was a United States Army lieutenant general. He was prominent as the highest-ranking member of the Army Reserve on duty with the Regular Army in the 1960s, and as commander of the Fourth United States Army. In the 1950s and 1960s, Colglazier was recognized as one of the military's foremost experts on logistics management.

== Early life ==
Colglazier graduated from Texas A&M University in 1925 with a degree in civil engineering, and began employment with his family's construction company, San Antonio's Colglazier Construction Company.

During the Great Depression Colglazier worked as director of the operations division for the Works Progress Administration in Texas.

== Start of military career ==
Colglazier received a commission as a second lieutenant upon graduating from college, and began a career in the Army Reserve.

== World War II ==
In 1941 Colglazier was called to active duty for World War II. After returning to active duty as a captain, he played a key role in the planning and organization for the construction of the Pentagon.

He attained the rank of colonel while carrying out engineer staff officer assignments in Northern Ireland, England, North Africa Italy and France. From 1942 to 1943, Colglazier was an engineer plans officer for the Mediterranean Base Section.

== Post-World War II ==
After the war, Colglazier returned to San Antonio and was the president of the family business, now reorganized as Colglazier McKennon Construction, while also continuing to serve with the Army Reserve.

== Korean War ==
In 1951, Colglazier was recalled to active duty for the Korean War. His assignments included several positions in the office of the Army's Deputy Chief of Staff for Logistics, G4, where he coordinated the flow of supplies and equipment into South Korea and was recognized for his expertise in the field of military logistics management.

== Post-Korean War ==
After the Korean War, Colgaizer was assigned as commander of U.S. Army Europe's Communications Zone, serving from 1956 to 1957.

From 1957 to 1959, Colgaizer was the Army's Assistant Deputy Chief of Staff for Logistics.

In 1959, he was named Deputy Chief of Staff for Logistics, receiving a promotion to lieutenant general and serving until 1964. At the time of his promotion, Colgaizer was the highest-ranking reservist serving on active duty. During this assignment, Colglazier oversaw modernization of weapons and vehicles and an increase in procurement as the Army's effort in Vietnam increased.

== Vietnam War ==
From 1964 to 1966, Colglazier commanded the Fourth Army in San Antonio. During his command, he was dispatched to Louisiana by President Lyndon Johnson to coordinate disaster relief efforts following Hurricane Betsy.

During his command, Colgaizer also generated headlines when he reduced the sentence of Private First Class Winstel R. Belton, who had gone on a hunger strike to protest orders to report to Vietnam. Belton was originally sentenced to five years imprisonment, but Colglazier reduced the penalty to a one-year suspended sentence, provided that Belton report to Vietnam, which he did.

== Awards ==
His personal decorations included the Distinguished Service Medal, Legion of Merit, Bronze Star Medal, Army Commendation Medal, Order of the British Empire, French Legion of Honor and French Croix de Guerre.

== Military retirement and later career ==
Colglazier retired from the Army in 1966. In retirement he remained active with Texas A&M, serving as councilman-at-large for the Association of Former Students. He was named a Texas A&M Distinguished Alumnus in 1971. In 1997 he was inducted to the Texas A&M Corps of Cadets Hall of Honor.

== Death and burial ==
Colglazier resided in San Antonio and died there on 23 January 1993. He was buried at Fort Sam Houston National Cemetery, Section AI, Plot 644.
