= Donald Prentice Booth =

United States Army general (1902–1993)

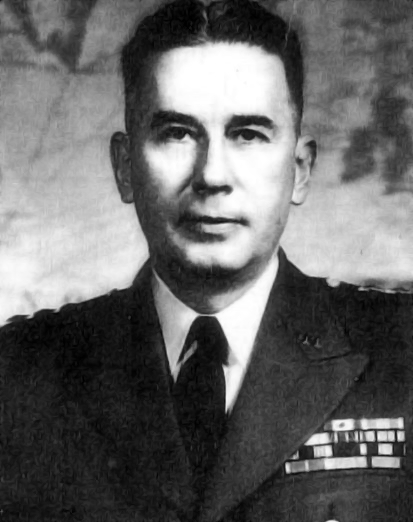
- General Booth as High Commissioner of the Ryukyu Islands in 1961
- Born: 21 December 1902; Albany, New York, United States
- Died: 30 October 1993 (aged 90); Santa Barbara, California, United States
- Burial place: Arlington National Cemetery, Virginia, United States
- Military career
- Allegiance: United States
- Branch: United States Army
- Service years: 1926–1962
- Rank: Lieutenant general
- Unit: Corps of Engineers
- Commands: Persian Gulf Command; 28th Infantry Division; 9th Infantry Division; Ryukyu Islands; IX Corps; Fourth United States Army
- Conflicts: World War II
- Awards: Distinguished Service Medal; Order of the Rising Sun, Second Class

Donald Prentice Booth (21 December 1902 – 30 October 1993) was a lieutenant general in the United States Army. During World War II he was the US Army's youngest theater commander. After World War II he was known for his commands of the 28th Infantry Division, the 9th Infantry Division and the Fourth United States Army. In addition, he served as High Commissioner of the Ryukyu Islands from 1958 to 1961.

== Early life ==
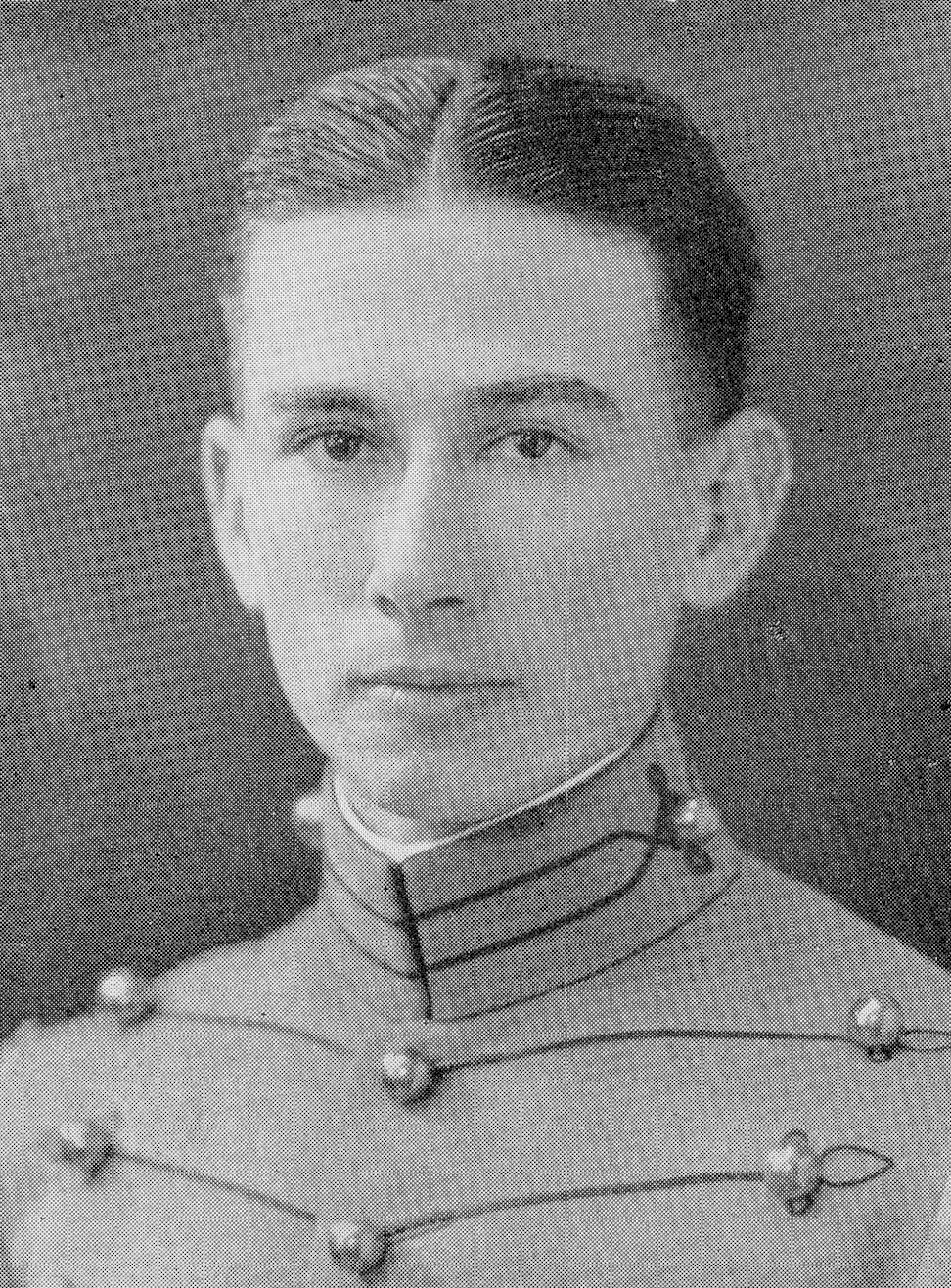
At West Point in 1926

Donald Prentice Booth was the son of Colonel Alfred James Booth (1875–1937), a career Army officer and veteran of the Spanish–American War and World War I. Donald Booth attended Hawaii's Punahou School, and high schools in San Antonio, Texas, Albany, New York, and Patchogue, New York before graduating from Leavenworth High School in Leavenworth, Kansas in 1921. He graduated from the United States Military Academy in 1926 and was commissioned a second lieutenant of Engineers.

== Early military career ==
After receiving his commission Booth pursued graduate studies in engineering at Cornell University.

Booth graduated from the Army Engineer Officer Course in 1930.

From 1935 to 1939 he was an instructor at the US Military Academy.

Booth graduated from the Command and General Staff School in 1940. Later that year, he served with the 2nd Engineers at Fort Sam Houston, Texas and was then transferred to be Assistant to the District Engineer in Seattle from 1940 to 1942.

== World War II ==
From 1942 to 1944, Booth served as Director of Ports for the Persian Gulf Command, receiving promotion to brigadier general in May 1944. The Persian Gulf Command was responsible for transporting supplies to the U.S.S.R. after it joined the Allied war effort. Booth served as Chief of Staff from 1944 to 1945, and commanded the organization from early 1945 until the end of the war.

== Post World War II ==
Following World War II Booth served in positions of increasing visibility and responsibility, including a posting as Executive Assistant to the Undersecretary of War

From 1953 to 1954 General Booth was commander of the 28th Infantry Division in Germany when this National Guard organization was activated to replace active duty units sent to Asia during the Korean War.

Booth commanded the 9th Infantry Division, also in Germany, from May to November, 1954.

From 1955 to 1957 Booth was the Army's Assistant Chief of Staff for Personnel, G-1.

Promoted to lieutenant general in 1957, he served as the Deputy Chief of Staff for Personnel until 1958.

Booth served as US High Commissioner of the Ryukyu Islands and commander of IX Corps from 1958 to 1961.

From 1961 to 1962 Booth was commander of the Fourth United States Army.

== Awards and decorations ==
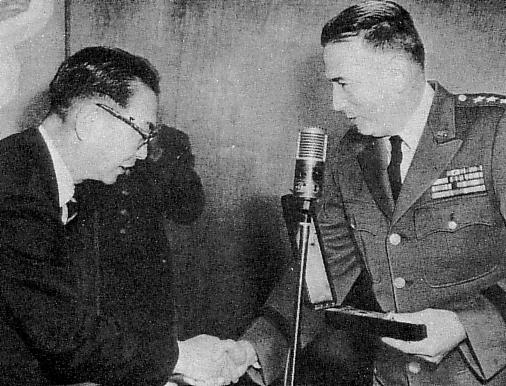
Booth receives Order of the Rising Sun

Booth's awards included multiple presentations of the Distinguished Service Medal. The Union of Soviet Socialist Republics decorated him with the Order of Kutuzov Second Class for his service as Commanding General, Persian Gulf Command. He also received an Honorary Commander of the Order of British Empire. In 1961 he received the Order of the Rising Sun, Second Class to recognize his efforts as High Commissioner for the Ryukyu Islands.

== Retirement and death ==
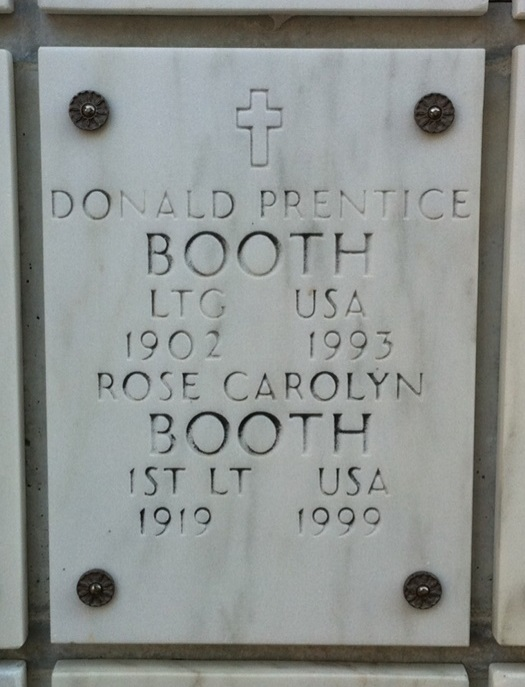
Grave at Arlington National Cemetery

In retirement, Booth lived in Santa Barbara, California, where he died on October 30, 1993. He was buried at Arlington National Cemetery, Section 3-HH, Row 2, Site 3.
