= Edgar Zell Steever II =

US Army general (1849–1920)

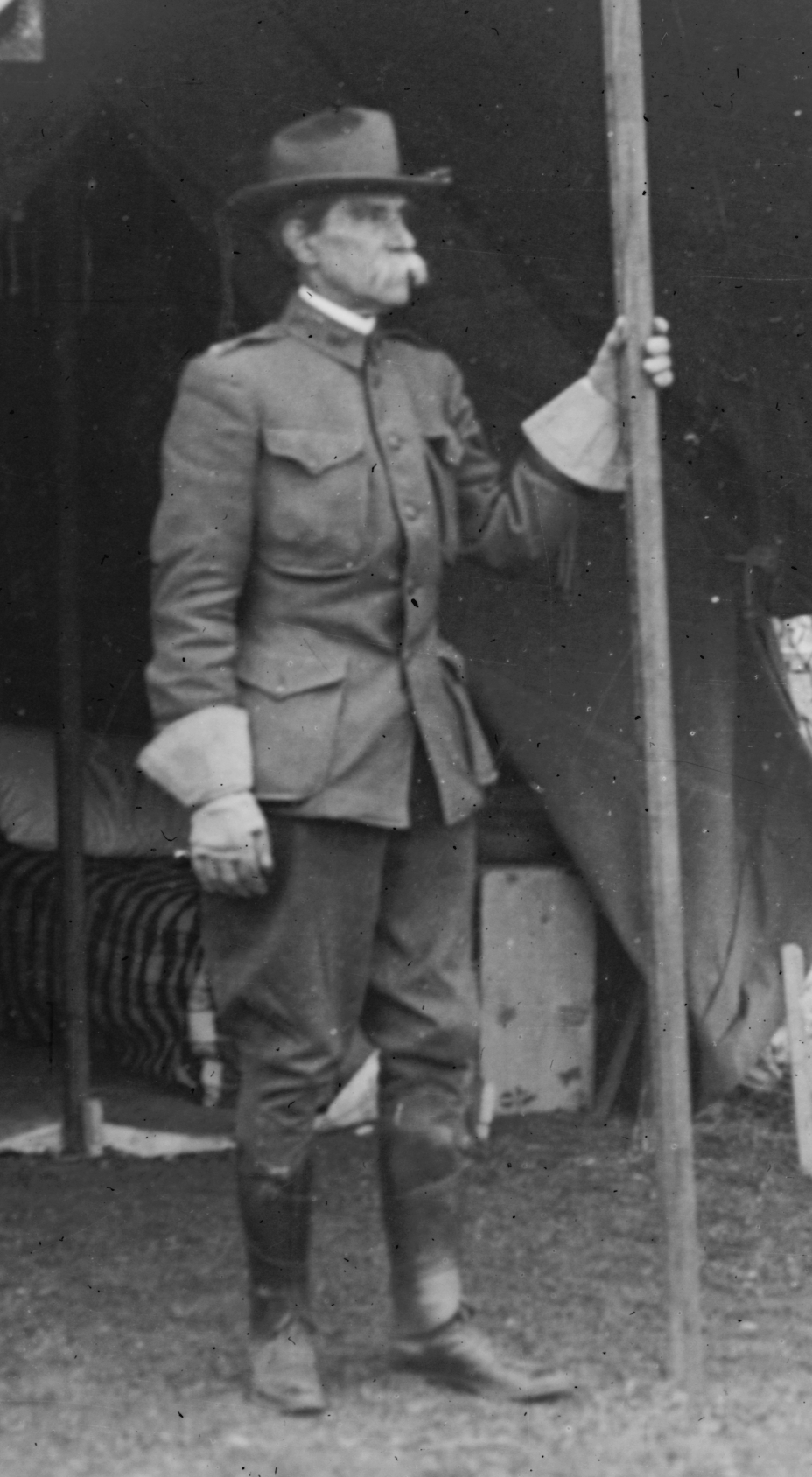
Colonel Edgar Zell Steever II in 1912 as commander of the El Paso district

Brigadier General Edgar Zell Steever II (August 20, 1849 – January 19, 1920) was an American soldier.

== Early life ==
He was born on August 20, 1849, in Philadelphia, Pennsylvania. He was educated in Philadelphia before attending West Point, graduating second in his class in 1871.

== Career ==
As a lieutenant, Steever served in the Indian Wars. He was involved in hostilities against the Sioux in 1872 In October 1874, he and another officer of Company G of the third Cavalry led a show of force which quelled a possible uprising at the Flagpole Affair at the Red Cloud Agency. In 1872, Steever was detailed by Secretary of War Belknap as commander of the Palestine Exploration Society. In the 1890s, Steever was engineer and secretary of the intercontinental railway commission. Steever served during the Spanish–American War and its aftermath, and was distinguished in the January 1900 Battle of Mount Bimmuaya. He later became civil and military governor of the Sulu Archipelago. From 1911 to 1913, when tensions erupted along the US–Mexico border, Steever, then a colonel, was in command of the 4th cavalry at El Paso. In 1913, Steever was promoted to brigadier general, and he retired later that year.

== Personal life and death ==
He was married and had two sons, E. Z. Steever III and M. D. Steever. He died January 19, 1920, at his home at The Cairo. His funeral was at St. Thomas' Church and he was buried at Arlington National Cemetery.
