= List of La Salle Extension University people =

This is a list of notable people who were enrolled or employed at La Salle Extension University in Chicago.

== Graduates ==
- Harold Arthur (1904–1971), Governor of Vermont from 1950 to 1951
- Maryam Babangida (1948–2009), Nigerian diplomat, wife of General Ibrahim Badamosi Babangida
- Bertram L. Baker (1898-1985), American politician, New York State Assemblyman from 1948 to 1970.
- Stephen Barrett (born 1933), American psychiatrist, author, co-founder of the National Council Against Health Fraud
- Don G. Pickney (born 1947), Christian Minister, Author, A Prosperity Phenomenon A Revelation of the Day of Jehovah Tsaba (Lord of hosts), Creation House, Charisma Media Publishing
- Madge Bradley (1904-2000), attorney and judge in San Diego, California
- Peter M. Callan (1894–1965), Illinois state representative
- Linwood Clark (1876–1965), U.S. Representative from Maryland
- Bruce C. Clarke (1901–1988), U.S. Army general who served as commander-in-chief in Europe
- Arthur Fletcher (1924–2005), government official known for affirmative action (Revised Philadelphia Plan), head of the United Negro College Fund
- John Strickland Gibson (1893–1960), U.S. Representative from Georgia
- William Thomas Granahan (1895–1956), U.S. Congressman from Pennsylvania 1945–47 and 1949–56
- Patricia Herzog (1922-2010), lawyer involved in key marital law case in California.
- Frank Reed Horton (1896–1966), Alpha Phi Omega founder
- Tom Huening (born 1942), American author, politician, and businessman
- Philippe Kieffer (1899-1962), French Navy officer
- Barry Melton (born 1947), guitarist (Country Joe and The Fish), criminal defense attorney.
- John Warwick Montgomery (born 1931), American lawyer, theologian and academic known for his work in the field of Christian Apologetics; Distinguished Research Professor of Philosophy and Christian Thought at Patrick Henry College.
- Edwin W. Blomquist, member of the Wisconsin State Assembly and mayor of Adams, Wisconsin
- Jessie Menifield Rattley (1929–2001), first Black female president of the National League of Cities, and chairperson of the Virginia Civil Rights Commission
- Eurith D. Rivers (1895–1967), Georgia Governor from 1937 to 1941
- Gertrude Elzora Durden Rush (1880–1962), first black woman admitted to the bar in Iowa
- Arthur Shores (1904–1996), lawyer and civil rights advocate
- Barney F. Spott (1898–1975), Wisconsin State Assemblyman
- Thelma Loyace Hawkins Stovall (1919–1994), Kentucky's first female Secretary of State, first female lieutenant governor, and female acting governor
- Craig Lyle Thomas (1933–2007), Wyoming Congressman (1989–1995) and senator (1995–2007)
- Stanley R. Tupper (1921–2006), U.S. Representative from Maine
- Clarence D. Tuska (1896-1985), co-founder of the American Radio Relay League and Director of Patent Operations at the Radio Corporation of America
- Kenneth Walker (1898–1943), United States Army Air Forces general, awarded the Medal of Honor
- Vic C. Wallin, Wisconsin State Assemblyman

== Instructors and administrators ==
- Jesse Grant Chapline (1870–1937), founder
- Hugo Münsterberg (1863–1916), psychologist and textbook author
- Adlai E. Stevenson I (1835–1914), politician, taught at LaSalle Extension University in its business and law programs.
