= Seventh United States Army =

Part of the U.S. Army, active intermittently between 1943 and 2010

Seventh Army
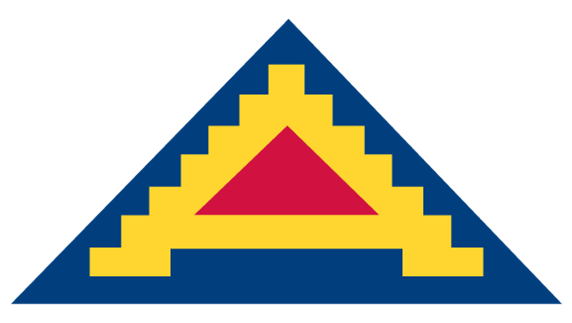
- Shoulder Sleeve Insignia
- Active: 25 February 1943 – 31 March 1946; 11 June 1946 – 15 March 1947; 24 November 1950–17 April 2010
- Disbanded: 17 April 2010
- Country: United States of America
- Branch: United States Army
- Type: Field Army
- Role: Headquarters
- Motto: Pyramid of Power
- Colors: White and red
- Campaigns: World War II; Sicily; Rome-Arno; Southern France (with arrowhead); Rhineland; Ardennes-Alsace; Central Europe

Commanders
- Notable commanders: Lt. Gen. George S. Patton; Lt. Gen. Mark W. Clark; Lt. Gen. Alexander Patch

Insignia
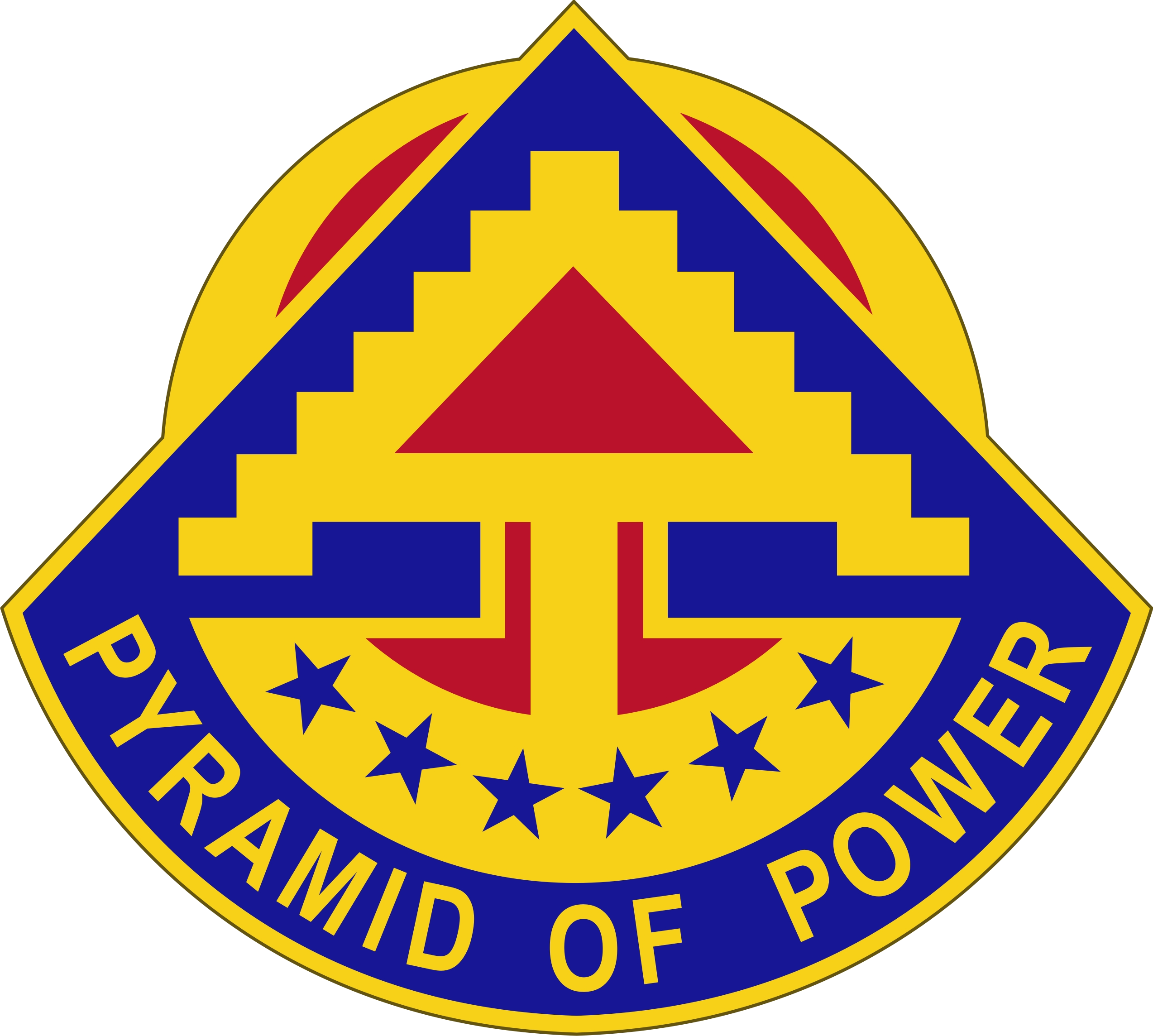
- Distinctive insignia

- Flag

The Seventh Army was a United States army created during World War II that evolved into the United States Army Europe (USAREUR) during the 1950s and 1960s. It served in North Africa and Italy in the Mediterranean Theater of Operations and France and Germany in the European Theater between 1942 and 1945.

Originally the I Armored Corps under command of Lieutenant General George S. Patton, it made landfall at Morocco during Operation Torch as the Western Task Force, the first all-U.S. force to enter the European war. Following successful defeat of the Wehrmacht under Field Marshal Erwin Rommel in North Africa, the I Armored Corps was redesignated the Seventh Army on 10 July 1943 while at sea en route to the Allied invasion of Sicily as the spearhead of Operation Husky.

After the conquests of Palermo and Messina the Seventh Army prepared for the invasion of France by its Mediterranean coast as the lead element of Operation Dragoon in August 1944. It then drove a retreating German army north and then east toward the Alsace, being absorbed into the newly created Sixth United States Army Group in mid-September. In January 1945 it repelled a fierce but brief enemy counter-offensive in the Colmar Pocket south of Strasbourg during the German Operation Nordwind, then completed its reduction of the region by mid-March.

In a lead role in Operation Undertone launched 15 March, the Seventh Army fought its way across the Rhine into Germany, capturing Nuremberg and then Munich. Elements reached Austria and crossed the Brenner Pass into Italy by 4 May, followed shortly by war's end on VE-Day, 8 May 1945.

== History ==
=== World War II ===
==== I Armored Corps in North Africa ====
The predecessor of Seventh Army was the I Armored Corps, which was activated on 15 July 1940 at Fort Knox, Kentucky. With the goal of stopping German expansion in Europe and Africa, it was decided that the first operation for United States Army forces would be to assist the British in driving German forces from North Africa. On 15 January 1942, Major General George S. Patton Jr. assumed command of I Armored Corps and began planning for the invasion of North Africa.

The Seventh Army arm patch was approved on 23 June 1943: On a blue isosceles triangular background, a seven-stepped letter "A," steps in yellow with the center in scarlet.

On 6 March 1943, following the defeat of the U.S. II Corps by the German Afrika Korps, commanded by Generalfeldmarschall Erwin Rommel, at the Battle of Kasserine Pass, Patton replaced Major General Lloyd Fredendall as Commanding General of the II Corps and was promoted to lieutenant general.

On 8 November 1942, General Patton was in command of the Western Task Force (a temporary redesignation of I Armored Corps for tactical deception), the only all-American force landing for Operation Torch, code name for the Allied invasion of French North Africa. I Armored Corps then began to drive east which complemented British forces driving from the west. The result was that Axis forces were trapped in Tunisia and were forced to surrender in May 1943.

==== Sicily and the Italian Peninsula ====
After succeeding in North Africa, Patton, now promoted to the rank of Lieutenant General, became commander of the newly formed Seventh Army, which was formed at midnight on 10 July 1943 by the redesignation of the I Armored Corps. The Allied invasion of Sicily in July 1943, was conducted in conjunction with the British Eighth Army, commanded by General Sir Bernard Montgomery, whom Patton perceived as a rival. Patton commanded the Seventh Army until early 1944.

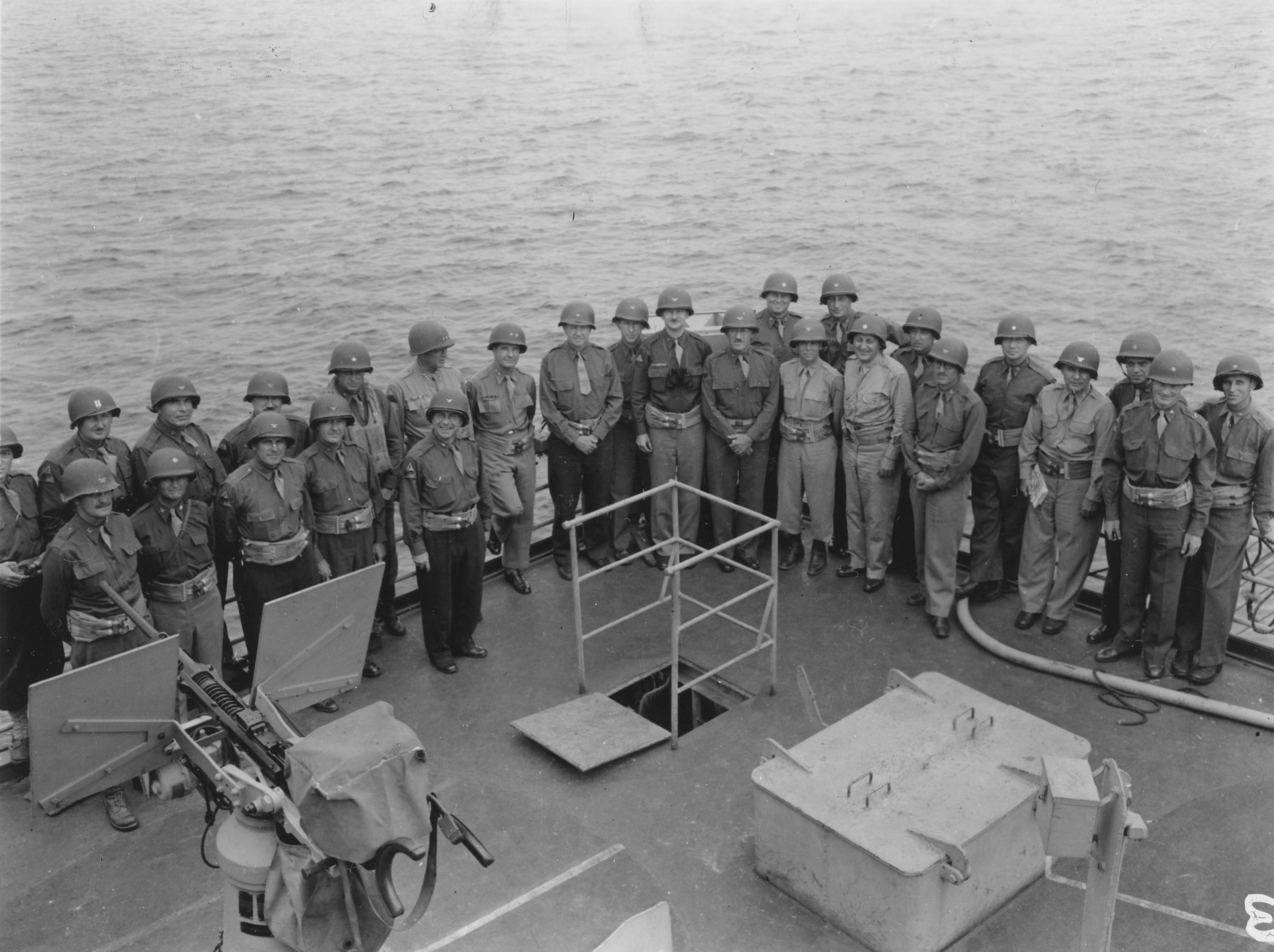
View of Lieutenant General Patton's Seventh Army staff aboard SS Monrovia, en route to Sicily, June/July 1943

The Seventh Army landed on several beaches in southern Sicily on 10 July 1943 and captured the Sicilian capital of Palermo on 22 July and, along with the British Eighth Army, captured Messina on 16 August. During the fighting, the elements of the Seventh Army killed or captured thousands of enemy soldiers, mainly Italians. During the operation the Seventh and Eighth Armies came under the command of the 15th Army Group, under General Sir Harold Alexander. The headquarters of the Seventh Army remained relatively inactive at Palermo, Sicily, and Algiers until January 1944, when Lieutenant General Mark W. Clark, then commanding the U.S. Fifth Army on the Italian Front, was assigned as commander and the Seventh Army began planning for the invasion of southern France.

==== France, Germany, and back into Italy ====
The invasion was originally given the code name of "Operation Anvil", but was changed to "Operation Dragoon" before the landing. In March 1944, Major General Alexander Patch, a highly experienced and competent commander, was assigned to command the Seventh Army, which moved to Naples, Italy, the following July. On 15 August 1944, elements of the Seventh Army assaulted the beaches of southern France in the St. Tropez and St. Raphael area. On 15 September, the Seventh was put under the field control of the 6th Army Group, under Lieutenant General Jacob L. Devers. The 6th Army Group also included the French First Army. Within one month, the Seventh Army, which by then employed three American divisions, five French divisions and the 1st Airborne Task Force, had advanced 400 miles north and joined with the Allied forces coming south from Normandy. In the process, the Seventh Army had liberated Marseille, Lyon, Toulon and all of Southern France.

The Seventh Army then assaulted the German forces in the Vosges Mountains and broke into the Alsatian Plain. During the Battle of the Bulge in late December, it extended its flanks to take over much of the area that had been the responsibility of U.S. Third Army then under the command of Patton, which allowed the Third to relieve surrounded American forces besieged at Bastogne. In mid-January 1945, the Seventh engaged in pitched battle seeking to regain ground lost to Germany's Operation Nordwind New Year's offensive. Along with the French First Army, the Seventh went on the offensive in February 1945 and eliminated the Colmar Pocket. After capturing the city of Strasbourg, the Seventh went into the Saar, assaulted the Siegfried Line, and reached the River Rhine during the first week of March, 1945.

In a lead role in Operation Undertone, the Seventh Army fought its way across the Rhine into Germany, captured Nuremberg and then Munich. Finally it crossed the Brenner Pass and made contact with Lieutenant General Lucian Truscott's U.S. Fifth Army at Vipiteno – once again on Italian soil.

In less than nine months of continuous fighting, the Seventh Army had advanced over 1,000 miles and for varying times had commanded 24 U.S. and Allied divisions, including the 3rd, 36th, 42nd, 44th, 45th, 63rd, 70th, 100th, and 103rd Infantry Divisions.

=== Cold War ===
The Seventh Army was inactivated in March 1946, in Germany, then reactivated for a short time at Atlanta, Georgia. Third Army then took on its duties in Atlanta and Seventh Army was inactivated again on 15 March 1947. Lieutenant General Oscar Griswold commanded both Seventh and Third Armies during the Atlanta period. It was reactivated by the United States European Command (EUCOM) with headquarters at Patch Barracks, Stuttgart-Vaihingen, Germany, on 24 November 1950 and assigned to command the ground and service forces of United States Army Europe (USAREUR). The two U.S. Army division sized units in the U.S. Occupation Zone of Germany, the 1st Infantry Division and the U.S. Constabulary with its headquarters at Bad Tölz, were assigned to the Seventh Army. Within a few weeks other assignments to the Seventh Army included the V and VII Corps. For over a decade members of the Seventh Army Symphony Orchestra performed in support of the United States Army's cultural diplomacy initiatives throughout Germany and Europe in the aftermath of World War II (1952–1962).

External audio
- You may hear recordings of the Seventh Army Symphony Orchestra performing in Europe (1956-1960); Here on 7aso.org

On 30 November 1966, the Seventh Army was relocated from Patch Barracks to Heidelberg. Following French disagreements with certain NATO policies, including the control of foreign nuclear weapons on French soil, United States European Command relocated from Paris the following year. From that time forward the Seventh Army has been the headquarters for all Army units under the European Command. Its major subordinate elements were the V Corps and VII Corps (Inactivated 1992.)

From 1 December 1966 to 2010, the commander of Seventh Army has been "dual hatted" as Commanding General, United States Army Europe. But on February 24, 2010 the lineage of the Seventh Army was fully incorporated into USAREUR-AF. Even so, several USAREUR-AF commanders continued using the Seventh Army commander title until at least 2017.

== Commanding generals ==
- LTG George S. Patton (10 July 1943 – 1 January 1944)
- LTG Mark W. Clark (1 January 1944 – 2 March 1944)
- LTG Alexander Patch (2 March 1944 – 2 June 1945)
- LTG Wade H. Haislip (2 June 1945 - August 1945)
- LTG Geoffrey Keyes (8 September 1945 – 31 March 1946) (inactivated)
- LTG Oscar Griswold (11 June 1946 – 15 March 1947) (inactivated)
- LTG Manton S. Eddy (1950–1952)
- LTG Charles Bolte (1952–1953)
- LTG William M. Hoge (1953)
- LTG Anthony C. McAuliffe (1953–1954)
- LTG Henry I. Hodes (1954–1956)
- LTG Bruce C. Clarke (1956–1958)
- LTG Clyde D. Eddleman (1958–1959)
- LTG Francis W. Farrell (1959–1960)
- LTG Garrison H. Davidson (1960–1962)
- LTG John C. Oakes (1962–1963)
- LTG Hugh P. Harris (1963–1964)
- LTG William W. Quinn (1964–1966)

Note - Starting in 1966, the commander of the United States Seventh Army was "dual hatted" as the Commanding General, United States Army Europe.

- GEN Andrew P. O'Meara (1 March 1966 – 1 June 1967)
- GEN James H. Polk (1 June 1967 – 20 March 1971)
- LTG Arthur S. Collins Jr. (20 March 1971 – 26 May 1971) (acting)
- GEN Michael S. Davison (26 May 1971 – 29 June 1975)
- GEN George S. Blanchard (30 June 1975 – 29 May 1979)
- GEN Frederick J. Kroesen Jr. (29 May 1979 – 15 April 1983)
- GEN Glenn K. Otis (15 April 1983 – 23 June 1988)
- GEN Crosbie E. Saint (24 June 1988 – 9 July 1992)
- GEN David M. Maddox (9 July 1992 – 19 December 1994)
- GEN William W. Crouch (19 December 1994 – 5 August 1997)
- GEN Eric K. Shinseki (5 August 1997 – 10 November 1998)
- GEN Montgomery C. Meigs (10 November 1998 – 3 December 2002)
- GEN Burwell B. Bell III (3 December 2002 – 14 December 2005)
- GEN David D. McKiernan (3 December 2002 – 2 May 2008)
- LTG Gary D. Speer (2 May 2008 – 28 August 2008) (acting)
- GEN Carter F. Ham (28 August 2008 – 17 April 2010)
