= Commanding General, United States Army Europe and Africa =

Senior appointment in the United States Army

Commanding General of United States Army Europe and Africa
- Insignia of USAREUR-AF

- Flag of a U.S. Army four-star general

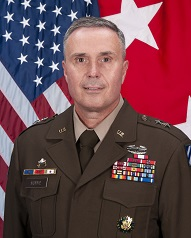
- Incumbent; Major General Christopher Norrie (acting) since July 2, 2026
- United States Army Europe and Africa
- Type: Service component commander
- Abbreviation: CG USAREUR-AF
- Reports to: Commander, United States European Command (operational); Secretary of the Army (administrative); Chief of Staff of the United States Army (administrative)
- Seat: Lucius D. Clay Kaserne, Wiesbaden, Germany
- Appointer: The president; with Senate advice and consent
- Term length: 2–3 years; (approx.)
- Formation: June 8, 1942
- First holder: MG James E. Chaney
- Deputy: Deputy Commanding General, U.S. Army Europe and Africa
- Website: Official website

The commanding general of United States Army Europe and Africa (CG USAREUR-AF) (Note: June 8, 1942, activated as European Theater of Operations, U.S. Army (ETOUSA); July 1, 1945, redesignated U.S. Forces European Theater (USFET); March 15, 1947, redesignated European Command (EUCOM); August 1, 1952, redesignated U.S. Army, Europe (USAREUR); December 1, 1966, redesignated U.S. Army Europe and Seventh Army (USAREUR / 7A); December 17, 2010, redesignated U.S. Army Europe (USAREUR); October 1, 2020, redesignated U.S. Army Europe and Africa (USAREUR-AF)) was formerly known as the commander-in-chief of United States Army Europe (CINCUSAREUR). (Note: The Commander in Chief concurrently was US Military Governor and had a personal staff in Berlin. The EUCOM staff was in Frankfurt and commanded by the Deputy CINCEUR/EUCOM Chief of Staff (CofS). LTG Huebner was Deputy CINCEUR/EUCOM CofS when the headquarters relocated to Campbell Barracks, Heidelberg, between February and June 1948. When GEN Clay retired, LTG Huebner served from 15 May to 2 July 1949 as Acting CINCEUR/US Military Governor, with headquarters in Heidelberg. From 2 July 1949 the Military Governor was replaced by a civilian US high commissioner which ended the commander's dual role.) Prior to 8 May 1945 the official title was Commander, European Theater of Operations, United States Army. From 1953 to 1967 the commanding general of USAREUR was "dual hatted" as commander of the Central Army Group of NATO forces in Germany.

== List of USAREUR commanders/commanding generals ==
No.	Commanding General		Term		
No.	Portrait	Name	Took office	Left office	Term length
-	James E. Chaney	Major General; James E. Chaney (1885–1967); Acting	June 8, 1942	June 21, 1942	13 days
-	Russell P. Hartle	Major General; Russell P. Hartle (1889–1961); Acting	June 21, 1942	June 24, 1942	3 days
1	Dwight D. Eisenhower	Lieutenant General; Dwight D. Eisenhower (1890–1969)	June 24, 1942	February 4, 1943	225 days
2	Frank M. Andrews	Lieutenant General; Frank M. Andrews (1884–1943)	February 4, 1943	May 3, 1943	88 days
-	William S. Key	Major General; William S. Key; Acting	May 3, 1943	May 7, 1943	4 days
3	Jacob L. Devers	Lieutenant General; Jacob L. Devers (1887–1979)	May 7, 1943	January 16, 1944	254 days
(1)	Dwight D. Eisenhower	General of the Army; Dwight D. Eisenhower (1890–1969)	January 16, 1944	November 11, 1945	1 year, 299 days
-	George S. Patton Jr.	General; George S. Patton Jr. (1885–1945); Acting	November 11, 1945	November 26, 1945	15 days
4	Joseph T. McNarney	General; Joseph T. McNarney (1893–1972)	November 26, 1945	March 15, 1947	1 year, 109 days
5	Lucius D. Clay	General; Lucius D. Clay (1898–1978)	March 15, 1947	May 15, 1949	2 years, 61 days
6	Clarence R. Huebner	Lieutenant General; Clarence R. Huebner (1888–1972)	May 15, 1949	September 2, 1949	110 days
7	Thomas T. Handy	General; Thomas T. Handy (1892–1982)	September 2, 1949	August 12, 1952	2 years, 345 days
8	Manton S. Eddy	Lieutenant General; Manton S. Eddy (1892–1962)	August 12, 1952	April 1, 1953	232 days
9	Charles L. Bolte	General; Charles L. Bolte (1895–1989)	April 1, 1953	September 29, 1953	181 days
10	William M. Hoge	General; William M. Hoge (1894–1979)	September 29, 1953	February 1, 1955	1 year, 125 days
11	Anthony McAuliffe	General; Anthony McAuliffe (1898–1975)	February 1, 1955	May 1, 1956	1 year, 90 days
12	Henry I. Hodes	General; Henry I. Hodes (1899–1962)	May 1, 1956	April 1, 1959	2 years, 335 days
13	Clyde D. Eddleman	General; Clyde D. Eddleman (1902–1992)	April 1, 1959	October 20, 1960	1 year, 202 days
14	Bruce C. Clarke	General; Bruce C. Clarke (1901–1988)	October 20, 1960	May 1, 1962	1 year, 193 days
15	Paul L. Freeman Jr.	General; Paul L. Freeman Jr. (1907–1988)	May 1, 1962	March 18, 1965	2 years, 321 days
16	Andrew P. O'Meara	General; Andrew P. O'Meara (1907–2005)	March 18, 1965	June 1, 1967	2 years, 75 days
17	James H. Polk	General; James H. Polk (1911–1992)	June 1, 1967	March 20, 1971	3 years, 292 days
-	Arthur S. Collins Jr.	Lieutenant General; Arthur S. Collins Jr. (1915–1984); Acting	March 20, 1971	May 26, 1971	67 days
18	Michael S. Davison	General; Michael S. Davison (1917–2006)	May 26, 1971	June 29, 1975	4 years, 34 days
19	George S. Blanchard	General; George S. Blanchard (1920–2006)	June 30, 1975	May 29, 1979	3 years, 333 days
20	Frederick J. Kroesen Jr.	General; Frederick J. Kroesen Jr. (1923–2020)	May 29, 1979	April 15, 1983	3 years, 321 days
21	Glenn K. Otis	General; Glenn K. Otis (1929–2013)	April 15, 1983	June 23, 1988	5 years, 69 days
22	Crosbie E. Saint	General; Crosbie E. Saint (1936–2018)	June 24, 1988	July 9, 1992	4 years, 15 days
23	David M. Maddox	General; David M. Maddox (1938–2026)	July 9, 1992	December 19, 1994	2 years, 163 days
24	William W. Crouch	General; William W. Crouch (1941–2024)	December 19, 1994	August 5, 1997	2 years, 229 days
25	Eric K. Shinseki	General; Eric K. Shinseki (born 1942)	August 5, 1997	November 10, 1998	1 year, 97 days
26	Montgomery C. Meigs	General; Montgomery C. Meigs (1945–2021)	November 10, 1998	December 3, 2002	4 years, 23 days
27	Burwell B. Bell III	General; Burwell B. Bell III (born 1947)	December 3, 2002	December 14, 2005	3 years, 11 days
28	David D. McKiernan	General; David D. McKiernan (born 1950)	December 14, 2005	May 2, 2008	2 years, 140 days
-	Gary D. Speer	Lieutenant General; Gary D. Speer (born 1950); Acting	May 2, 2008	August 28, 2008	118 days
29	Carter F. Ham	General; Carter F. Ham (born 1952)	August 28, 2008	March 8, 2011	2 years, 192 days
30	Mark P. Hertling	Lieutenant General; Mark P. Hertling (born 1953)	March 25, 2011	November 1, 2012	1 year, 221 days
-	James C. Boozer	Major General; James C. Boozer; Acting	November 1, 2012	December 1, 2012	30 days
31	Donald M. Campbell Jr.	Lieutenant General; Donald M. Campbell Jr. (born 1956)	December 1, 2012	November 5, 2014	1 year, 339 days
32	Ben Hodges	Lieutenant General; Ben Hodges (born 1958)	November 5, 2014	December 15, 2017	3 years, 40 days
-	Timothy P. McGuire	Major General; Timothy P. McGuire; Acting	December 15, 2017	January 18, 2018	34 days
33	Christopher G. Cavoli	General; Christopher G. Cavoli (born c. 1965) (Note: Assumed office as a lieutenant general. Was promoted to general on October 1, 2020 when he assumed the additional assignment of commanding general of U.S. Army Africa.)	January 18, 2018	June 28, 2022	4 years, 161 days
34	Darryl A. Williams	General; Darryl A. Williams (born 1961)	June 28, 2022	December 10, 2024	2 years, 165 days
35	Christopher T. Donahue	General; Christopher T. Donahue (born 1969)	December 10, 2024	July 2, 2026	1 year, 204 days
-	Christopher Norrie	Major General; Christopher Norrie; Acting	July 2, 2026	Incumbent	73 days

== See also ==
- United States Army Europe
- Commanding General, United States Army Pacific
