= 130th Infantry Regiment (United States) =

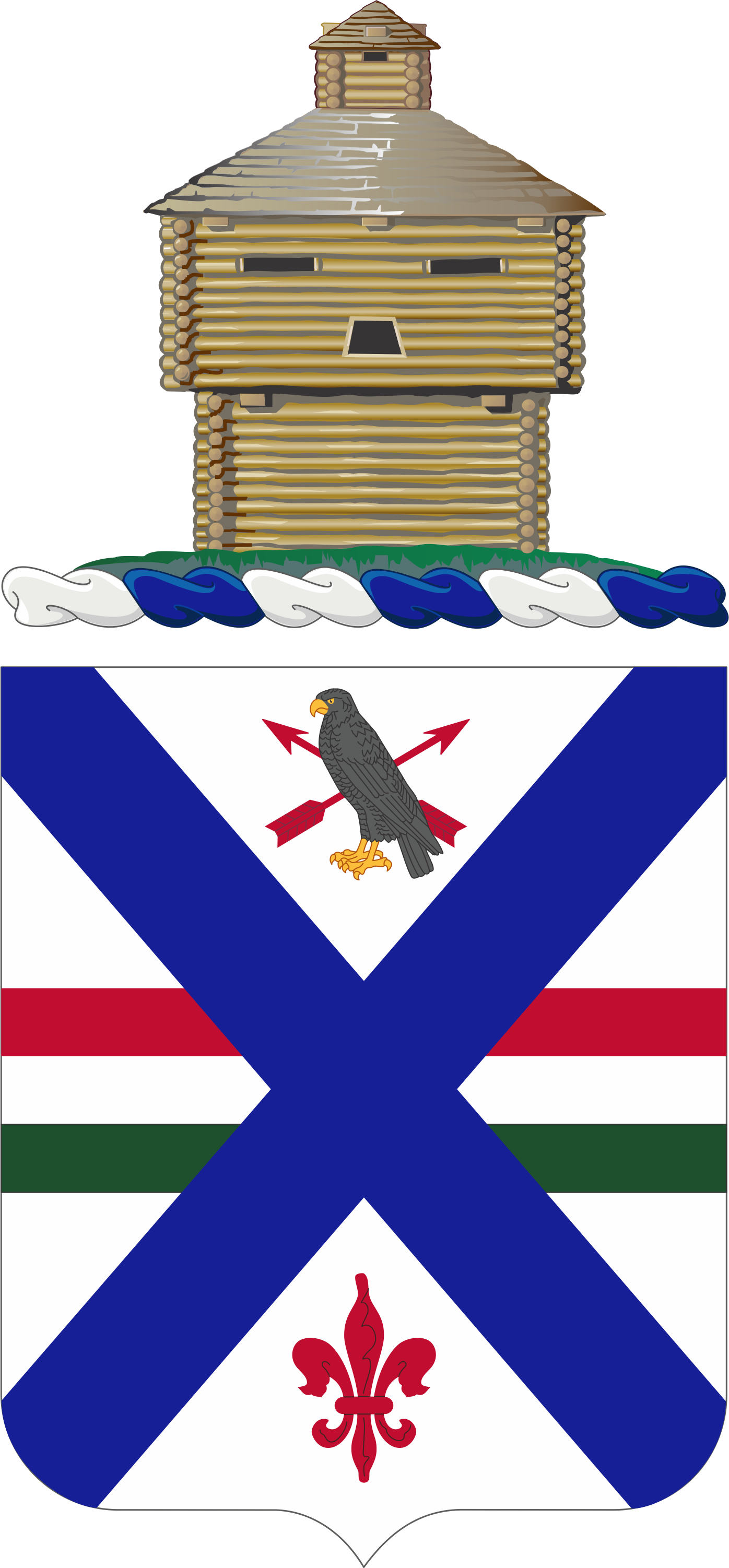
- Coat of Arms
- Active: 1809
- Country: United States
- Branch: Illinois Army National Guard
- Type: Infantry
- Size: Regiment
- Nickname: BLACKHAWKS
- Motto: "ALWAYS READY"

Commanders
- Current commander: LTC Edward M. Worman
- Notable commanders: Arthur S. Collins Jr.

Insignia
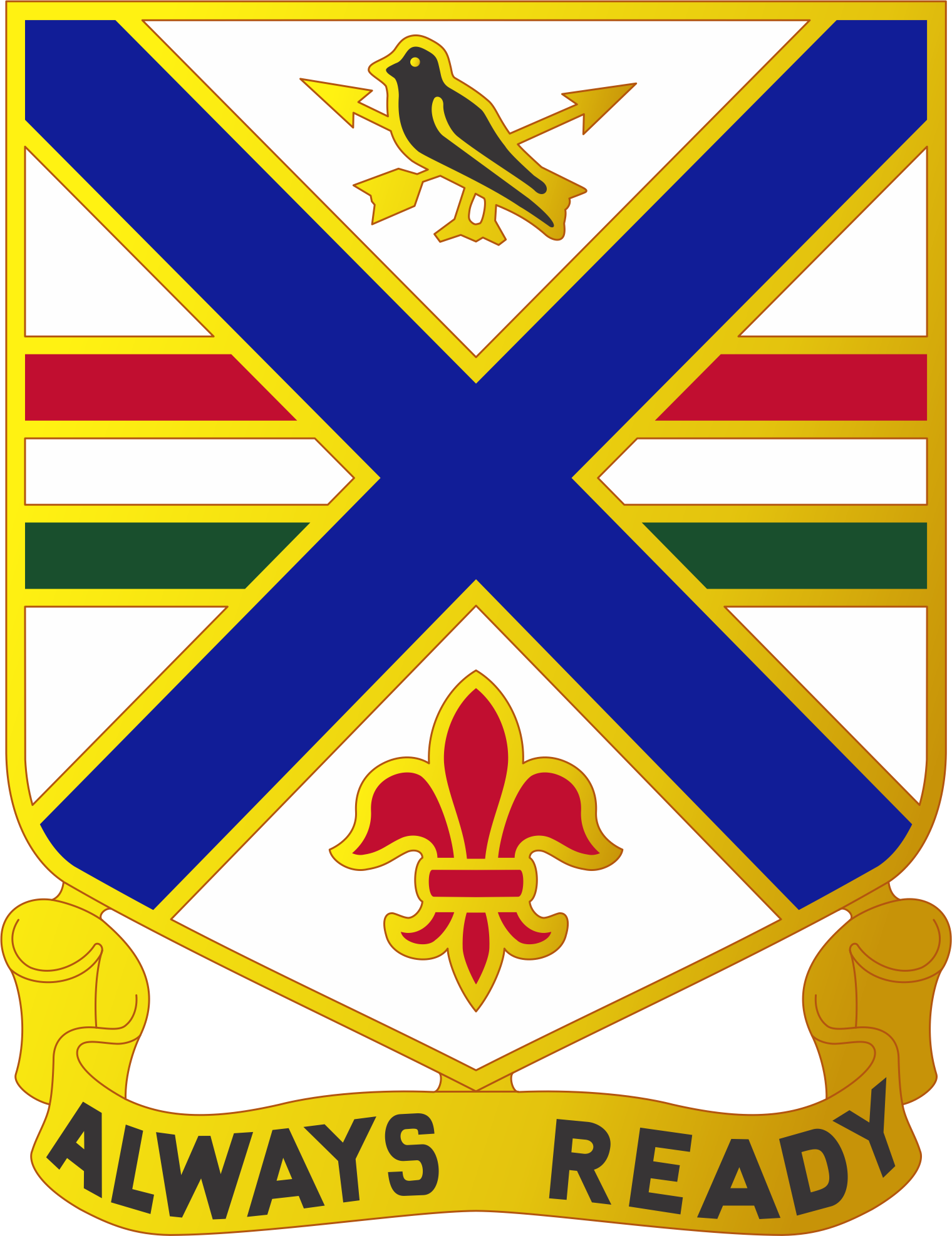
- Distinctive Unit Insignia

The 130th Infantry Regiment is an infantry regiment in the Army National Guard. It is one of several Army National Guard units with campaign credit for the War of 1812.

== Lineage ==
Constituted 1 March 1809 as the Volunteer Militia of Illinois Territory and organized thereafter as independent companies

- Mustered into federal service 18 February 1813 as the Regiment of Illinois Territory Militia; mustered out of federal service 16 June 1813 and elements reverted to independent status in the Illinois Territory Militia

(Illinois Territory Militia redesignated 26 August 1818 as the Illinois Militia)

- Reorganized and mustered into federal service 19 June 1831 as Duncan’s Brigade, to include the following units from central and southern Illinois:
- 1st and 2nd Regiments of Illinois Mounted Volunteers
- Major Bailey’s Odd Battalion
- Major Buckmaster’s Battalion of Spies.

Mustered out of federal service 2 July 1831 at Rock Island and elements reverted to independent status in the Illinois Militia

- Reorganized and mustered into federal service 30 April 1832 as Whiteside’s Brigade, to include five regiments of Illinois Mounted Volunteers.

Mustered out of federal service 28 May 1832 at the mouth of the Fox River; veterans concurrently reorganized and mustered into federal service as Colonel Jacob Fry’s Regiment of Illinois Volunteer Militia; mustered out of federal service 15 June 1832 at Ottawa.

- Major Bailey’s Odd Battalion and Major Buckmaster’s Battalion of Spies mustered into federal service 20 June 1832; mustered out of federal service 13 August 1832 at Fort Walker, Illinois
- Reorganized as the 1st, 2nd, 3rd, and 4th Regiments, Illinois Volunteer Militia, and mustered into federal service 30 June – 4 July 1846 at Alton, Illinois, and Jefferson Barracks, Missouri
- 1st and 2nd Regiments mustered out of federal service 17–18 June 1847 at Camargo, Mexico; 3d and 4th Regiments mustered out of federal service 25–29 May 1847 at New Orleans, Louisiana
- Reorganized as the 7th, 8th, 9th, and 10th Regiments, Illinois Volunteer Infantry, and mustered into federal service 25–29 April 1861 at Springfield and Cairo
- Mustered out of federal service 25–26 July 1861 at Cairo; concurrently reorganized and mustered into federal service at Cairo
- 10th Regiment mustered out of federal service 4 July 1865 at Louisville, Kentucky; 7th and 9th Regiments mustered out of federal service 9 July 1865 at Louisville, Kentucky; 8th Regiment mustered out of federal service 4 May 1866 at Baton Rouge, Louisiana
- Reorganized 1874–1875 in the Illinois Militia as independent companies
- Companies in central and southern Illinois consolidated 21 December 1875 to form the 5th Infantry Regiment
- (Illinois Militia redesignated 21 December 1875 as the Illinois State Guard; Illinois State Guard redesignated 1 July 1877 as the Illinois National Guard)
- Reorganized 1881-1882 as the 5th and 8th Infantry Regiments
- 8th Infantry Regiment redesignated 31 December 1890 as the 4th Infantry Regiment
- 5th Infantry Regiment mustered into federal service 4–9 May 1898 at Springfield as the 5th Illinois Volunteer Infantry; mustered out of federal service 16 October 1898 at Atlanta, Georgia, and reverted to state status as the 5th Infantry
- 4th Infantry Regiment mustered into federal service 19–20 May 1898 at Springfield as the 4th Illinois Volunteer Infantry; mustered out of federal service 2 May 1899 at Atlanta, Georgia, and reverted to state status as the 4th Infantry
- 4th Infantry mustered into federal service 27 June 1916; mustered out of federal service 15 March 1917 at Fort Sheridan, Illinois
- 4th and 5th Infantry drafted into federal service 5 August 1917. Former 4th and 5th Infantry reorganized as federal and redesignated 12 October 1917 as the 130th Infantry and the 123d Machine Gun Battalion, respectively, elements of the 33rd Infantry
- Demobilized 31 May 1919 at Camp Grant (Illinois)
- Reorganized in 1921 in the Illinois National Guard as the 4th and 5th Infantry
- Consolidated 22 June 1921 and consolidated unit designated as the 4th Infantry
- Redesignated 13 December 1921 as the 130th Infantry and assigned to the 33d Division (later redesignated as the 33d Infantry Division); Headquarters federally recognized 24 May 1922 at Delavan
- (Location of headquarters changed 14 May 1940 to Carbondale)
- Inducted into federal service 5 March 1941 at home stations
- Inactivated 5 February 1946 in Japan

Relieved 5 July 1946 from assignment to the 33d Infantry Division and assigned to the 44th Infantry Division (United States)

- Reorganized and federally recognized 27 March 1947 in the Illinois National Guard with headquarters at Danville.

Ordered into active federal service 15 February 1952 at home stations; released 10 October 1954 from active federal service and reverted to state control; concurrently relieved from assignment to the 44th Infantry Division

- Consolidated 1 December 1954 with the 132d Infantry (organized and federally recognized 16 March 1954 in the Illinois Army National Guard with headquarters at Carbondale), and consolidated unit designated as the 130th Infantry, with headquarters at Carbondale, and assigned to the 33d Infantry Division
- Reorganized 1 March 1959 as a parent regiment under the Combat Arms Regimental System to consist of the 1st and 2d Battle Groups, elements of the 33d Infantry Division
- Reorganized 1 April 1963 to consist of the 1st, 2d, and 3d Battalions, elements of the 33d Infantry Division
- Reorganized 1 February 1968 to consist of the 2d and 3d Battalions, elements of the 47th Infantry Division

Withdrawn 5 February 1987 from the Combat Arms Regimental System and reorganized under the United States Army Regimental System with headquarters at Urbana

- Reorganized 10 February 1991 to consist of the 2d and 3d Battalions, elements of the 34th Infantry Division
- Reorganized 1 October 1996 to consist of the 2d Battalion, an element of the 35th Infantry Division.

Ordered into active federal service 5 January 2005 at home stations; released from active federal service 1 September 2006 and reverted to state control; concurrently, relieved from assignment to the 35th Infantry Division and assigned to the 33d Infantry Brigade Combat Team

- Redesignated 1 October 2005 as the 130th Infantry Regiment
- (Location of headquarters changed 1 September 2006 to Marion)

== Distinctive unit insignia ==
- Description

A Gold color metal and enamel device 1 1/8 inches (2.9 cm) in height overall consisting of a shield blazoned: Argent, a fess Gules of the first and Vert fesswise between, in chief two arrows Or saltirewise behind a Black hawk and in base a fleur-de-lis of the second, overall a saltire Azure. Attached below the shield a Gold scroll inscribed "ALWAYS READY" in Black letters.

- Symbolism

The shield is white, the old Infantry color. Service in the Black Hawk War is symbolized by the Black Hawk and the two red arrows, service in the Mexican War by the horizontal belt across the shield of red, white and green, the colors of the Mexican flag. The Civil War service is indicated by the blue saltire cross from the Confederate flag. The service in France during World War I is indicated by the fleur-de-lis.

- Background

The distinctive unit insignia was approved on 3 February 1925.

== Coat of arms ==
- Blazon
  - Shield

Argent, a fess Gules of the first and Vert fesswise between, in chief two arrows of the second saltirewise behind a Black hawk Proper and in base a fleur-de-lis of the second, overall a saltire Azure.

- Crest

That for the regiments and separate battalions of the Illinois Army National Guard: On a wreath Argent and Azure, upon a grassy field the blockhouse of old Fort Dearborn Proper. Motto: ALWAYS READY.

- Symbolism
- Shield

The shield is white, the old Infantry color. Service in the Black Hawk War is symbolized by the Black Hawk and the two red arrows, service in the Mexican War by the horizontal belt across the shield of red, white and green, the colors of the Mexican flag. The Civil War service is indicated by the blue saltire cross from the Confederate flag. The service in France during World War I is indicated by the fleur-de-lis.

- Crest

The crest is that of the Illinois Army National Guard.

- Background

The coat of arms was approved on 17 June 1924.

== Campaign streamers ==
War of 1812

- Streamer without inscription

Indian Wars

- Black Hawk

Mexican War

- Buena Vista
- Vera Cruz
- Cerro Gordo

Civil War

- Henry and Donelson
- Shiloh
- Vicksburg
- Chattanooga
- Atlanta
- Missouri 1861
- Kentucky 1861-62
- Mississippi 1862-63
- Alabama 1862-64
- Tennessee 1862-64
- Georgia 1864
- North Carolina 1865
- South Carolina 1865

World War I

- Somme Offensive
- Meuse-Argonne
- Lorraine 1918
- Picardy 1918

World War II

- New Guinea
- Luzon

War on Terrorism

- Iraq:
- Iraqi Governance
- National Resolution

Headquarters Company, 2d Battalion (Marion), additionally entitled to:

- World War II
- Asiatic-Pacific Theater, Streamer without inscription

== Decorations ==
- Philippine Presidential Unit Citation, Streamer embroidered 17 OCTOBER 1944 TO 4 JULY 1945

== Medal of Honor recipients ==
World War II

- Dexter J. Kerstetter

Rank: Private First Class.
Organization: Company C, 130th Infantry Regiment, 33rd Infantry Division.
Place: Near Galiano, Luzon, Philippine Islands.
Date: 13 April 1945.

Citation
He was with his unit in a dawn attack against hill positions approachable only along a narrow ridge paralleled on each side by steep cliffs which were heavily defended by enemy mortars, machineguns, and rifles in well-camouflaged spider holes and tunnels leading to caves. When the leading element was halted by intense fire that inflicted 5 casualties, Pfc. Kerstetter passed through the American line with his squad. Placing himself well in advance of his men, he grimly worked his way up the narrow steep hogback, meeting the brunt of enemy action. With well-aimed shots and rifle-grenade fire, he forced the Japs to take cover. He left the trail and moving down a cliff that offered only precarious footholds, dropped among 4 Japs at the entrance to a cave, fired his rifle from his hip and killed them all. Climbing back to the trail, he advanced against heavy enemy machinegun, rifle, and mortar fire to silence a heavy machinegun by killing its crew of 4 with rifle fire and grenades. He expended his remaining ammunition and grenades on a group of approximately 20 Japs, scattering them, and returned to his squad for more ammunition and first aid for his left hand, which had been blistered by the heat from his rifle. Resupplied, he guided a fresh platoon into a position from which a concerted attack could be launched, killing 3 hostile soldiers on the way. In all, he dispatched 16 Japs that day. The hill was taken and held against the enemy's counterattacks, which continued for 3 days. Pfc. Kerstetter's dauntless and gallant heroism was largely responsible for the capture of this key enemy position, and his fearless attack in the face of great odds was an inspiration to his comrades in their dangerous task.

- Howard E. Woodford

Rank: Staff Sergeant.
Organization: Company I, 130th Infantry Regiment, 33rd Infantry Division.
Place: Near Tabio, Luzon, Philippine Islands.
Date: 6 June 1945.

Citation
He volunteered to investigate the delay in a scheduled attack by an attached guerrilla battalion. Reaching the line of departure, he found that the lead company, in combat for the first time, was immobilized by intense enemy mortar, machinegun, and rifle fire which had caused casualties to key personnel. Knowing that further failure to advance would endanger the flanks of adjacent units, as well as delay capture of the objective, he immediately took command of the company, evacuated the wounded, reorganized the unit under fire, and prepared to attack. He repeatedly exposed himself to draw revealing fire from the Japanese strongpoints, and then moved forward with a 5-man covering force to determine exact enemy positions. Although intense enemy machinegun fire killed 2 and wounded his other 3 men, S/Sgt. Woodford resolutely continued his patrol before returning to the company. Then, against bitter resistance, he guided the guerrillas up a barren hill and captured the objective, personally accounting for 2 hostile machinegunners and courageously reconnoitering strong defensive positions before directing neutralizing fire. After organizing a perimeter defense for the night, he was given permission by radio to return to his battalion, but, feeling that he was needed to maintain proper control, he chose to remain with the guerrillas. Before dawn the next morning the enemy launched a fierce suicide attack with mortars, grenades, and small-arms fire, and infiltrated through the perimeter. Though wounded by a grenade, S/Sgt. Woodford remained at his post calling for mortar support until bullets knocked out his radio. Then, seizing a rifle he began working his way around the perimeter, encouraging the men until he reached a weak spot where 2 guerrillas had been killed. Filling this gap himself, he fought off the enemy. At daybreak he was found dead in his foxhole, but 37 enemy dead were lying in and around his position. By his daring, skillful, and inspiring leadership, as well as by his gallant determination to search out and kill the enemy, S/Sgt. Woodford led an inexperienced unit in capturing and securing a vital objective, and was responsible for the successful continuance of a vitally important general advance.

== See also ==
- Distinctive unit insignia (U.S. Army)
