= Bruce C. Clarke =

United States Army general

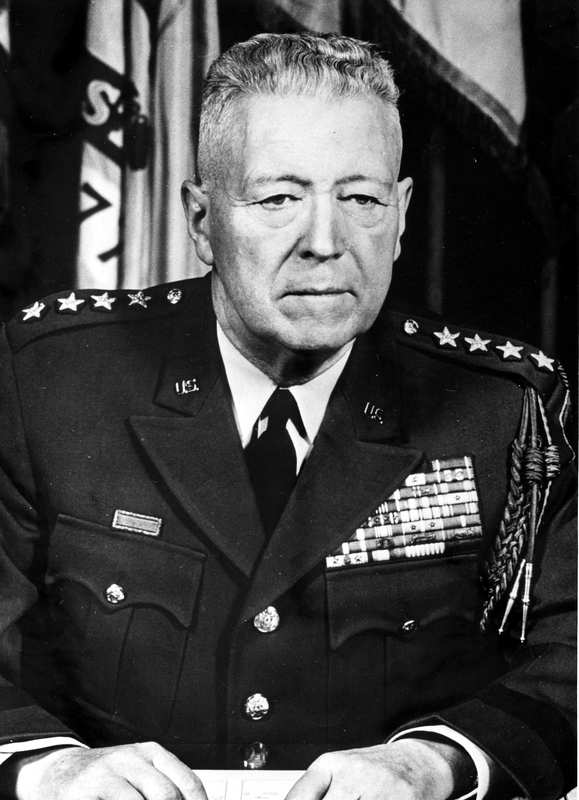
- General Clarke in 1961
- Born: 29 April 1901; Adams, New York, U.S.
- Died: 17 March 1988 (aged 86); Bethesda, Maryland, U.S.
- Burial place: Arlington National Cemetery
- Military career
- Allegiance: United States
- Branch: United States Army
- Service years: 1917–1919 (enlisted); 1925–1962 (officer)
- Rank: General
- Commands: United States Continental Army Command; United States Army Europe; Seventh United States Army; United States Army, Pacific; I Corps; X Corps; 1st Armored Division; Combat Command B, 7th Armored Division; Combat Command A, 4th Armored Division
- Conflicts: World War I; World War II; Operation Overlord; Siegfried Line campaign; Lorraine Campaign; Battle of Arracourt; Battle of the Bulge; Battle of St. Vith; Western Allied invasion of Germany; Korean War
- Awards: Distinguished Service Cross; Army Distinguished Service Medal (3); Silver Star (3); Legion of Merit; Bronze Star Medal (3); Air Medal; Army Commendation Medal

Bruce Cooper Clarke (29 April 1901 – 17 March 1988) was a United States Army general. He was a career officer who served in World War I, World War II, and the Korean War. He was the commander of United States Army, Pacific from December 1954 to April 1956, Continental Army Command from 1958 to 1960, and commanded United States Army, Europe from 1960 to 1962.

== Early life and education ==
Clarke was born on a farm in Adams, New York, on 29 April 1901. He dropped out of high school to enlist in the United States Army in 1917, served in the Coast Artillery Corps during World War I, and gained appointment to the United States Military Academy through the New York National Guard. He graduated in 1925 with a commission in the Corps of Engineers. In addition to his degree from West Point, he earned a civil engineering degree from Cornell University and an LL.B. from La Salle Extension University. He also was an equivalent graduate of the National War College and is credited with starting the Non-Commissioned Officers Academy system.

== Military career ==
In the Second World War, as a colonel and then a brigadier general, he commanded Combat Command A (CCA) of the 4th Armored Division in General George S. Patton's Third Army, leading it to victory over a superior German armored force at the Battle of Arracourt in September 1944. In December, while in command of CCB of the 7th Armored Division, Clarke led the relief of St. Vith during the Battle of the Bulge, which slowed the German attack. Writing afterward, General Eisenhower credited Clarke's actions as the "turning point" in that battle.

During the Korean War, Clarke commanded the 1st Armored Division, Fort Hood, Texas, from 1951 to 1953. He then transferred to Korea, where he commanded I Corps in 1953 and X Corps from 1953 to 1954. He also trained the First Republic of Korea Army.

Clarke was then assigned as Commanding General, United States Army Pacific in Hawaii from 1954 to 1956. After his tour in Hawaii, he commanded the Seventh United States Army in Germany from 1956 to 1958. He received a promotion to the rank of four-star general in August 1958. From 1958 to 1960 he commanded the Continental Army Command, heading the entire Army school system which, at the time, had over 250,000 participants. From 1960 to 1962 he served as Commander in Chief of United States Army Europe, before retiring on April 30, 1962.

On 18 October 1971, the Supreme Council of the Scottish Rite for the Southern Jurisdiction of the United States conferred upon Clarke, a 33rd Degree Freemason, the Grand Cross of the Court of Honor. This is the highest Masonic award, with only 11 holders out of 600,000 Freemasons in the Southern Jurisdiction of the Scottish Rite.

== Military decorations ==
Clarke's military decorations include the Distinguished Service Cross, three Army Distinguished Service Medals, three Silver Stars, the Legion of Merit, and three Bronze Star Medals. He also received decorations from foreign countries including France, Germany, Great Britain, Korea, and the Philippines.

General Clarke's issued Distinguished Service Cross originally belonged to General George S. Patton. During Col Clarke's medal presentation, General Patton was unable to find the medal and instead awarded him his own. It and the rest of General Clarke's Medals and Awards are currently preserved in Clarke Middle School, Adams, New York.

- Distinguished Service Cross
- Army Distinguished Service Medal with two oak leaf clusters
- Silver Star with two oak leaf clusters
- Legion of Merit
- Bronze Star with two oak leaf clusters and "V" Device
- Army Commendation Medal
- Air Medal
- Presidential Unit Citation
- World War I Victory Medal
- American Defense Service Medal
- American Campaign Medal
- Asiatic-Pacific Campaign Medal
- European-African-Middle Eastern Campaign Medal with four campaign stars
- World War II Victory Medal
- Army of Occupation Medal
- National Defense Service Medal
- Korean Service Medal with two campaign stars
- Honorary Companion Order of the Bath (CB)
- United Nations Korea Medal
- Philippine Liberation Medal
- Philippine Independence Medal
- Korean Presidential Unit Citation
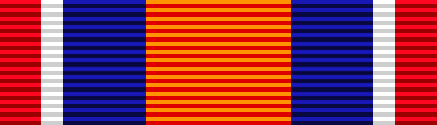
- Conspicuous Service Medal
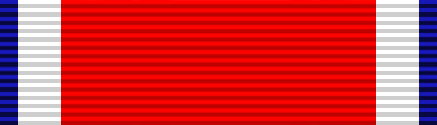
- Conspicuous Service Cross

== Death and burial ==
Clarke died after a stroke on 17 March 1988, at Walter Reed Army Medical Center and was buried with full military honors in Section 7-A (Grave 130) at Arlington National Cemetery. His wife, Bessie Mitchell Clarke, is buried with him.

== Bibliography ==
- Guidelines for the Leader and the Commander. 1968. Stackpole Books.

== See also ==
- Exercise Reforger
- POMCUS
- List of United States Army four-star generals
- List of recipients of the Silver Buffalo Award
- List of lieutenant generals in the United States Army before 1960
- List of La Salle Extension University people
- List of commanders of I Corps (United States)

Military offices
Preceded by Clyde D. Eddleman	Commanding General United States Army Europe; 1960–1962	Succeeded by Paul L. Freeman, Jr.
Preceded by Clyde D. Eddleman	Commanding General Seventh United States Army; 1959–1960	Succeeded by Francis William Farrell
