= Patricia Herzog =

American lawyer

Patricia Herzog née Patricia Reid Chamberlain
- Born: July 22, 1922; Japan
- Died: October 8, 2010 (aged 88); Corona del Mar, California
- Occupation: Lawyer
- Known for: Lawyer in the landmark Sullivan case

Patricia Herzog (July 27, 1922 – October 1, 2010), born Patricia Reid Chamberlain, was a lawyer in the landmark Sullivan case which prompted the legislature of California to amend its marital property law (called the Sullivan Law) to take into consideration expenses made for the support of spouses.

Herzog, a newspaper reporter living in Santa Ana, decided to change her career to law after reading a matchbook ad in the early 1950s. She signed up for mail-order law classes through the La Salle Extension University in Chicago. In 1957 she passed the bar, and in 1960 set up her own practice.

The New York Times described the start of her landmark case:

One day in 1978, Janet Sullivan walked into Ms. Herzog's office and said that she and her husband, Mark, who had just graduated from medical school, were getting a divorce. Ms. Sullivan insisted that her work as an accountant during the marriage meant that her husband's medical degree had been a "joint investment in time and money....Ms. Sullivan sought a share of the value of her husband's medical practice as part of the divorce settlement. "

After the lower courts ruled against her, Herzog filed an appeal to the Supreme Court of California. In the meantime, "publicity surrounding the case prompted the Legislature to pass an amendment to California's marital property law in 1985. While it stated that advanced degrees do not constitute property — and thus a divorced spouse was not entitled to a former spouse’s future earnings — it did authorize courts to reimburse the supporting spouses for their expenses. Their share of the costs of tuition and books, for example, could be included in alimony settlements." This law became known as the Sullivan Law.

Sullivan and Herzog were disappointed in the ruling, contending that the cost of the education didn't approach the value of the medical license. Herzog noted that she felt "half a loaf was better than none, but I did feel it was half a loaf."

After Herzog's death, retired state appellate judge Sheila Prell Sonenshine noted: "The Sullivan case, and then the Sullivan Law, was one of the first in the country to expand property rights for spouses and to recognize their contributions to the accumulation of marital property."
