= Dexter J. Kerstetter =

- Born: December 21, 1907; Centralia, Washington
- Died: July 9, 1972 (aged 64); Hood Canal, Washington
- Burial place: Tahoma National Cemetery
- Military career
- Allegiance: United States of America
- Branch: United States Army
- Rank: Sergeant
- Units: 130th Infantry Regiment, 33rd Infantry Division
- Conflicts: World War II
- Awards: Medal of Honor

Dexter James Kerstetter (December 21, 1907 – July 9, 1972) was a United States Army soldier and a recipient of the United States military's highest decoration—the Medal of Honor—for his actions in World War II.

== Biography ==
Kerstetter joined the Army from his birthplace of Centralia, Washington in March 1942, and by April 13, 1945, was serving as a private first class in Company C, 130th Infantry Regiment, 33rd Infantry Division. On that day, during a fight to take a ridge near Galiano, Luzon, the Philippines, he advanced ahead of his squad and engaged the Japanese soldiers alone until running out of ammunition. For these actions, he was awarded the Medal of Honor seven months later, on November 1, 1945. He was discharged from the army with the rank of sergeant in August 1945. He later served in the Washington National Guard, reaching the rank of major. Kerstetter drowned in a boating accident while fishing for salmon in the Hood Canal.

== Medal of Honor citation ==
Private First Class Kerstetter official Medal of Honor citation reads:

He was with his unit in a dawn attack against hill positions approachable only along a narrow ridge paralleled on each side by steep cliffs which were heavily defended by enemy mortars, machineguns, and rifles in well-camouflaged spider holes and tunnels leading to caves. When the leading element was halted by intense fire that inflicted 5 casualties, Pfc. Kerstetter passed through the American line with his squad. Placing himself well in advance of his men, he grimly worked his way up the narrow steep hogback, meeting the brunt of enemy action. With well-aimed shots and rifle-grenade fire, he forced the Japs to take cover. He left the trail and moving down a cliff that offered only precarious footholds, dropped among 4 Japs at the entrance to a cave, fired his rifle from his hip and killed them all. Climbing back to the trail, he advanced against heavy enemy machinegun, rifle, and mortar fire to silence a heavy machinegun by killing its crew of 4 with rifle fire and grenades. He expended his remaining ammunition and grenades on a group of approximately 20 Japs, scattering them, and returned to his squad for more ammunition and first aid for his left hand, which had been blistered by the heat from his rifle. Resupplied, he guided a fresh platoon into a position from which a concerted attack could be launched, killing 3 hostile soldiers on the way. In all, he dispatched 16 Japs that day. The hill was taken and held against the enemy's counterattacks, which continued for 3 days. Pfc. Kerstetter's dauntless and gallant heroism was largely responsible for the capture of this key enemy position, and his fearless attack in the face of great odds was an inspiration to his comrades in their dangerous task.

== Awards and decorations ==

Badge	Combat Infantryman Badge		
1st row	Medal of Honor		Bronze Star Medal
2nd row	Purple Heart	Army Good Conduct Medal	American Campaign Medal
3rd row	Asiatic-Pacific Campaign Medal with three campaign stars	World War II Victory Medal	Philippine Liberation Medal

== See also ==
- List of Medal of Honor recipients
- List of Medal of Honor recipients for World War II
