= Anthony McAuliffe =

United States Army general (1898–1975)

Anthony Clement McAuliffe
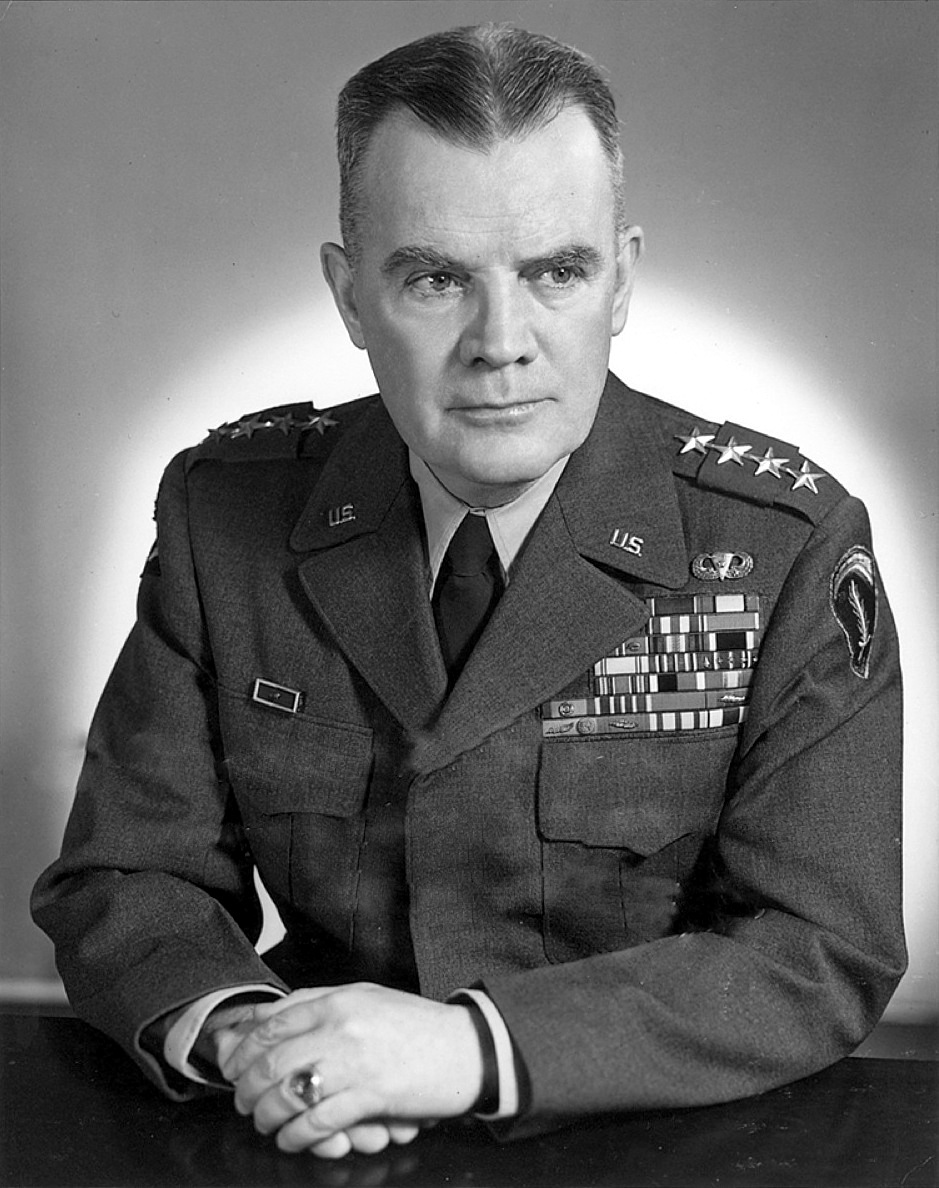
- McAuliffe in 1959
- Born: 2 July 1898; Washington, D.C., United States
- Died: 10 August 1975 (aged 77); Walter Reed Army Medical Center, Washington, D.C., United States
- Burial place: Arlington National Cemetery
- Education: United States Military Academy
- Military career
- Allegiance: United States
- Branch: United States Army
- Service years: 1918–1956
- Rank: General
- Nicknames: "Old Crock", "Nuts"
- Service number: 0-12263
- Units: Field Artillery Branch
- Commands: United States Army Europe; Seventh United States Army; Chemical Corps; 103rd Infantry Division
- Conflicts: World War II
- Awards: Distinguished Service Cross; Army Distinguished Service Medal (2); Silver Star; Legion of Merit; Bronze Star (2)

General Anthony Clement "Nuts" McAuliffe (2 July 1898 – 10 August 1975) was a senior United States Army officer who earned fame as the acting commander of the 101st Airborne Division defending Bastogne, Belgium, during the Battle of the Bulge in World War II. He is celebrated for his one-word reply to a German surrender ultimatum: "Nuts!"

After the battle, McAuliffe was promoted and given command of the 103rd Infantry Division, which he led from January 1945 to July 1945. In the post-war era, he was commander of United States Army Europe.

== Early life and military career ==
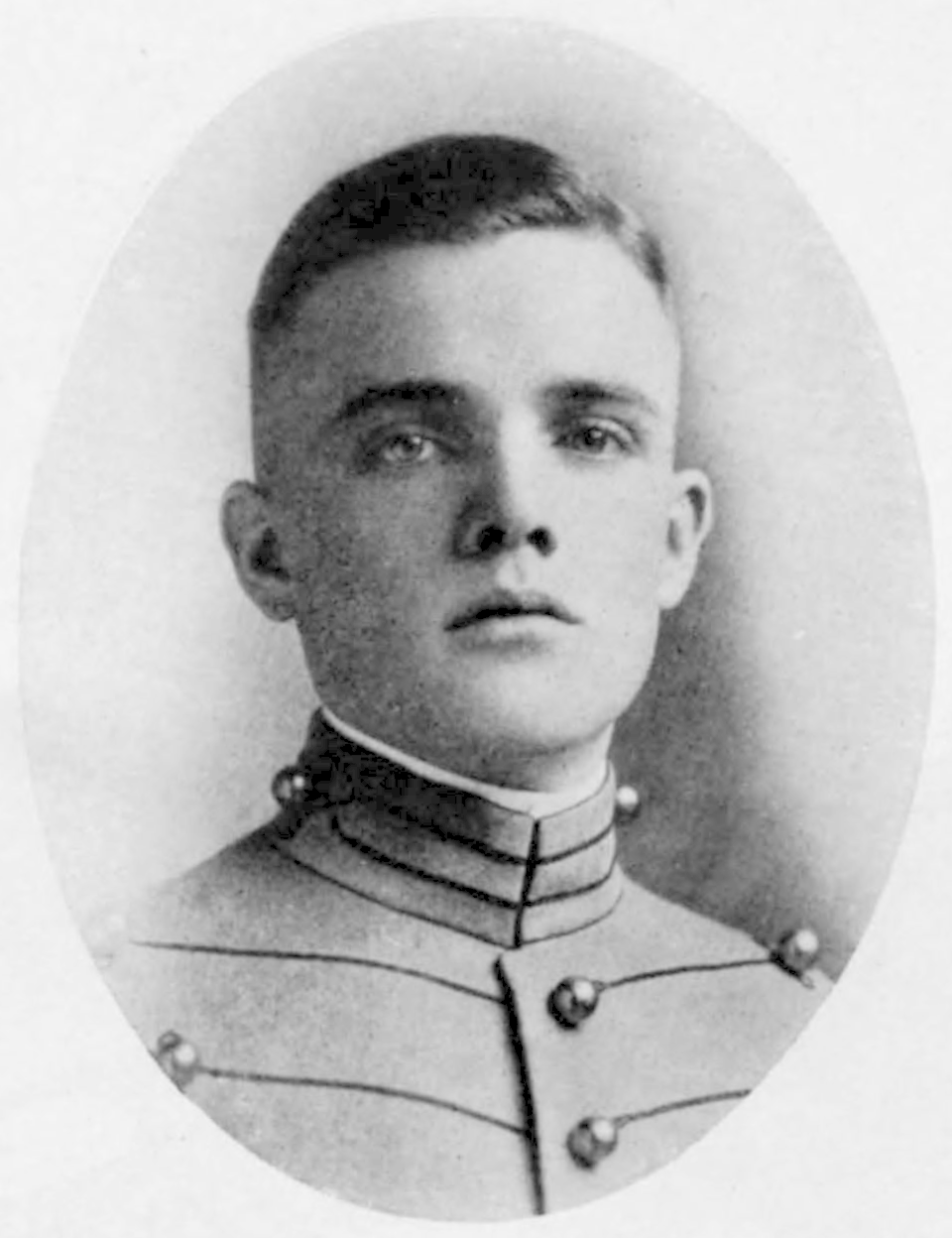
As a West Point cadet

McAuliffe was born in Washington, D.C., on 2 July 1898, to a family of Irish heritage. He attended West Virginia University from 1916 to 1917. He was a member of the West Virginia Beta chapter of Sigma Phi Epsilon fraternity during his time at West Virginia University. He enrolled at West Point in 1917. McAuliffe was part of an accelerated program and graduated shortly after the end of World War I, in November 1918.

During this time, he visited Europe for a short time and toured several battlefields. Assigned to field artillery, he graduated from the Artillery School in 1920. For the next 16 years, McAuliffe carried out typical peacetime assignments. By 1935, he had been promoted to the rank of captain. Later, he was chosen to attend the United States Army Command and General Staff College at Fort Leavenworth. In June 1940, McAuliffe graduated from the United States Army War College. Just before the Japanese attack on Pearl Harbor in December 1941, he was promoted again, temporarily becoming a lieutenant colonel with the Supply Division of the War Department General Staff. While in this position, McAuliffe supervised the development of such new technology as the bazooka and the jeep.

== World War II ==
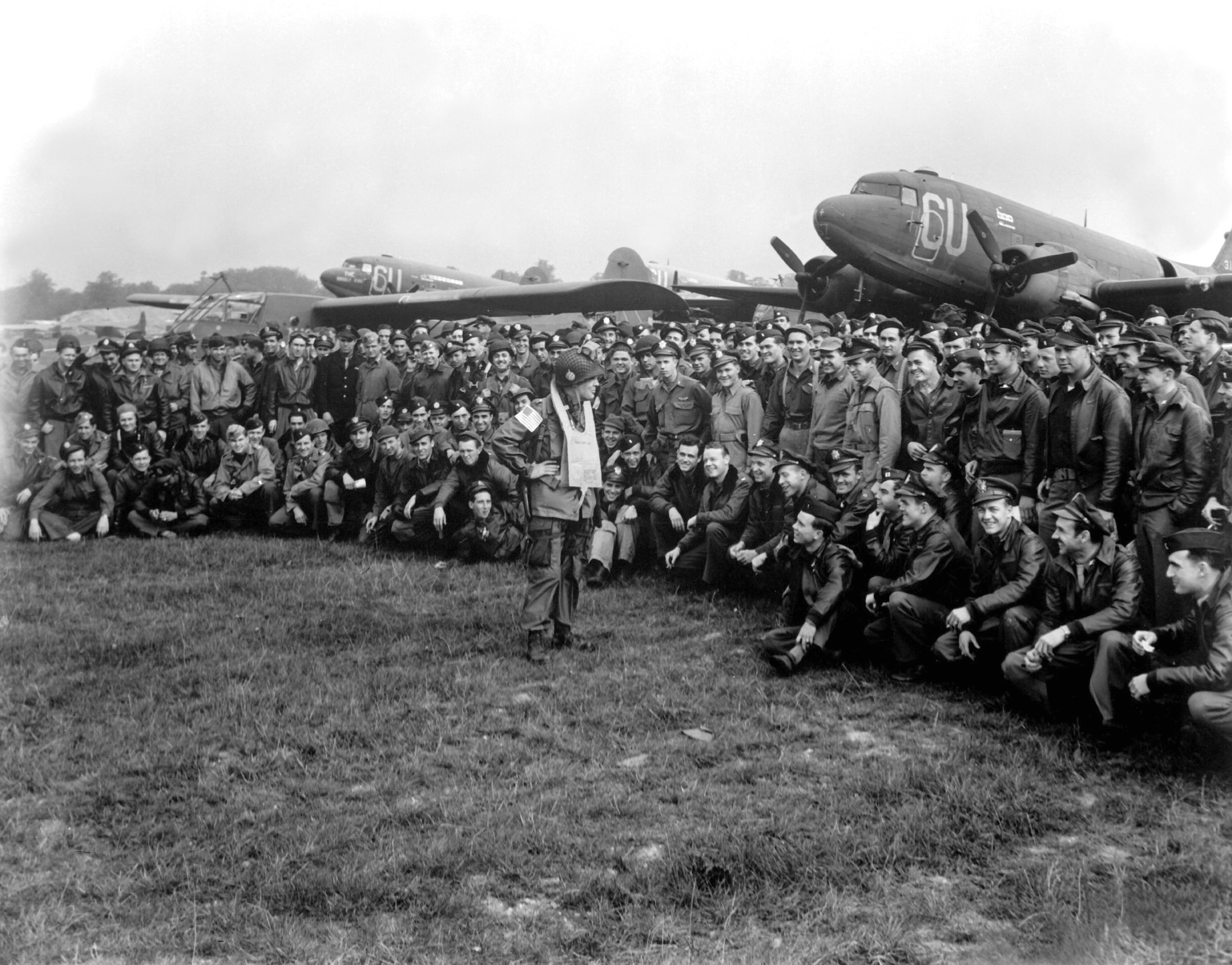
Brigadier General Anthony C. McAuliffe, artillery commander of the 101st Airborne Division, gives glider pilots last-minute instructions in England for Operation Market-Garden on 18 September 1944, before the take-off on D plus 1 of the operation.

Brigadier General McAuliffe commanded the division artillery of the 101st Airborne Division when he parachuted into Normandy on D-Day. He also landed by glider in the Netherlands during Operation Market Garden.

In December 1944, the German army launched the surprise attack that became the Battle of the Bulge. Major General Maxwell D. Taylor, commander of the 101st Airborne Division, was attending a staff conference in the United States at the time. During Taylor's absence, McAuliffe commanded the 101st and its attached troops. At Bastogne, the 101st was besieged by a far larger force of Germans under the command of General Heinrich Freiherr von Lüttwitz.

=== "NUTS!" ===
On 22 December 1944, von Lüttwitz dispatched a party consisting of a major, a lieutenant, and two enlisted men under a flag of truce (in German: Parlamentärflagge, the flag of negotiations) to deliver an ultimatum. Entering the American lines southeast of Bastogne (occupied by Company F, 2nd Battalion, 327th Glider Infantry), the German party delivered the following to Gen. McAuliffe:

To the U.S.A. Commander of the encircled town of Bastogne.

The fortune of war is changing. This time the U.S.A. forces in and near Bastogne have been encircled by strong German armored units. More German armored units have crossed the river Ourthe near Ortheuville, have taken Marche and reached St. Hubert by passing through Hompre-Sibret-Tillet. Libramont is in German hands.

There is only one possibility to save the encircled U.S.A. troops from total annihilation: that is the honorable surrender of the encircled town. In order to think it over a term of two hours will be granted beginning with the presentation of this note.

If this proposal should be rejected one German Artillery Corps and six heavy A. A. Battalions are ready to annihilate the U.S.A. troops in and near Bastogne. The order for firing will be given immediately after this two hours term.

All the serious civilian losses caused by this artillery fire would not correspond with the well-known American humanity.

The German Commander.

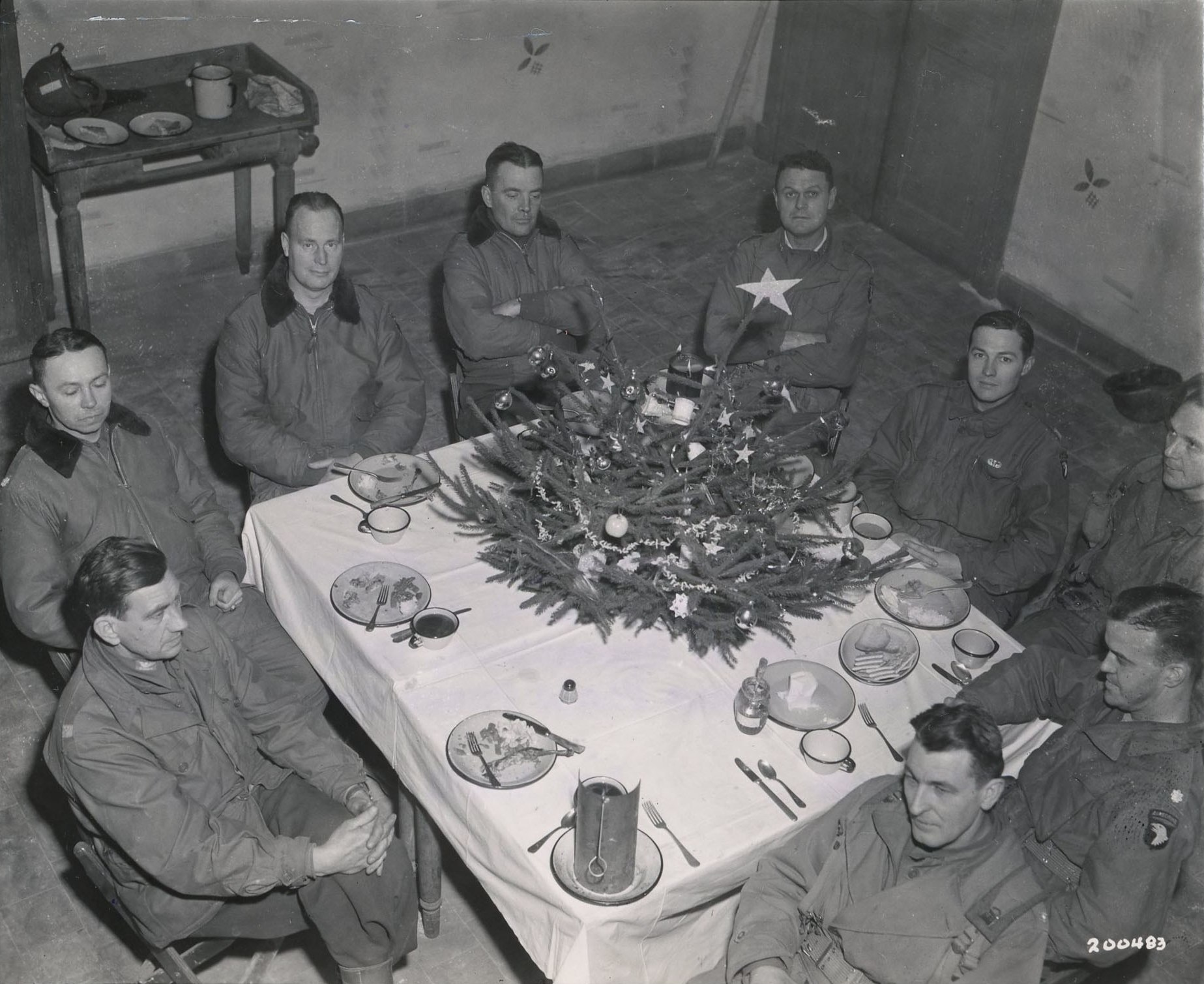
Brigadier General Anthony McAuliffe and his staff gathered inside Bastogne's Heintz Barracks for Christmas dinner 25 December 1944. This military barracks served as the Division Main Command Post during the siege.

According to those present when McAuliffe received the German message, he read it, crumpled it into a ball, threw it in a wastepaper basket, and muttered, "Aw, nuts". The officers in McAuliffe's command post were trying to find suitable language for an official reply when Lieutenant Colonel Harry Kinnard suggested that McAuliffe's first response summed up the situation well, and the others agreed. The official reply was typed and delivered by Colonel Joseph Harper, commanding the 327th Glider Infantry, to the German delegation. It was as follows:

To the German Commander.

NUTS!

The American Commander.

The German major appeared confused and asked Harper what the message meant. Harper said, "In plain English? Go to hell." The choice of "Nuts!" rather than something earthier was typical for McAuliffe. Captain Vincent Vicari, his personal aide at the time, recalled that "General Mac was the only general I ever knew who did not use profane language. 'Nuts' was part of his normal vocabulary."

The artillery fire did not materialize, although several infantry and tank assaults were directed at the positions of the 327th Glider Infantry. In addition, the German Luftwaffe attacked the town, bombing it nightly. The 101st held off the Germans until the 4th Armored Division arrived on 26 December to provide reinforcement.

=== Post-Bastogne ===
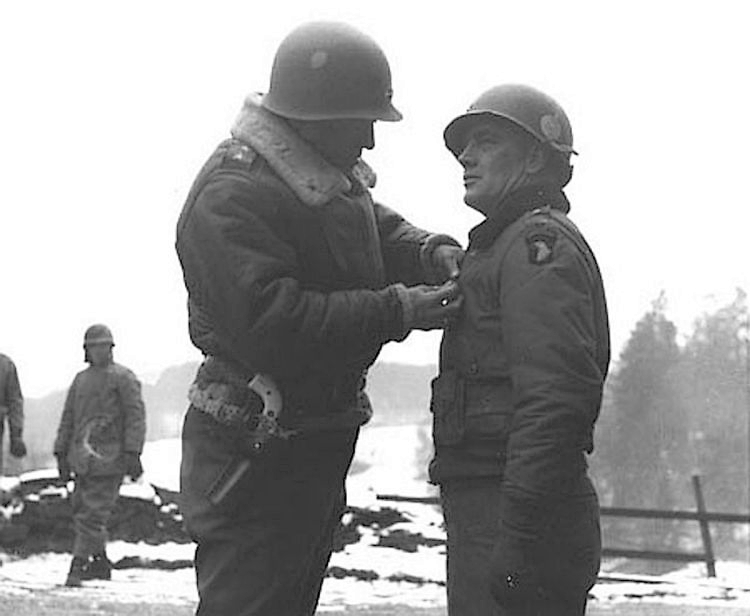
Brigadier General Anthony McAuliffe is decorated by Patton with the Distinguished Service Cross for the defense of Bastogne

For his actions at Bastogne, McAuliffe was awarded the Distinguished Service Cross by Lieutenant General George S. Patton, commanding the Third Army, on 30 December 1944 with official orders processed on 14 January 1945. He later received the Army Distinguished Service Medal twice, the Silver Star and the Legion of Merit.

Immediately after Bastogne, McAuliffe was promoted to major general and given command of the 103rd Infantry Division on 15 January 1945, his first divisional command assignment, which he retained until July 1945. Under McAuliffe, the 103rd reached the Rhine Valley on 23 March, and engaged in mopping-up operations in the plain west of the Rhine River. In April 1945, the division was assigned to occupational duties until 20 April, when it resumed the offensive, pursuing a fleeing enemy through Stuttgart and taking Münsingen on 24 April. On 27 April, elements of the division entered Landsberg, where Kaufering concentration camp, a subcamp of Dachau, was liberated. The 103rd crossed the Danube River near Ulm on 26 April. On 3 May 1945, the 103rd captured Innsbruck, Austria, with little to no fighting. It then seized the Brenner Pass and met the 88th Infantry Division of the U.S. Fifth Army at Vipiteno, Italy, thereby joining the Italian and Western European fronts.

== Post-war ==
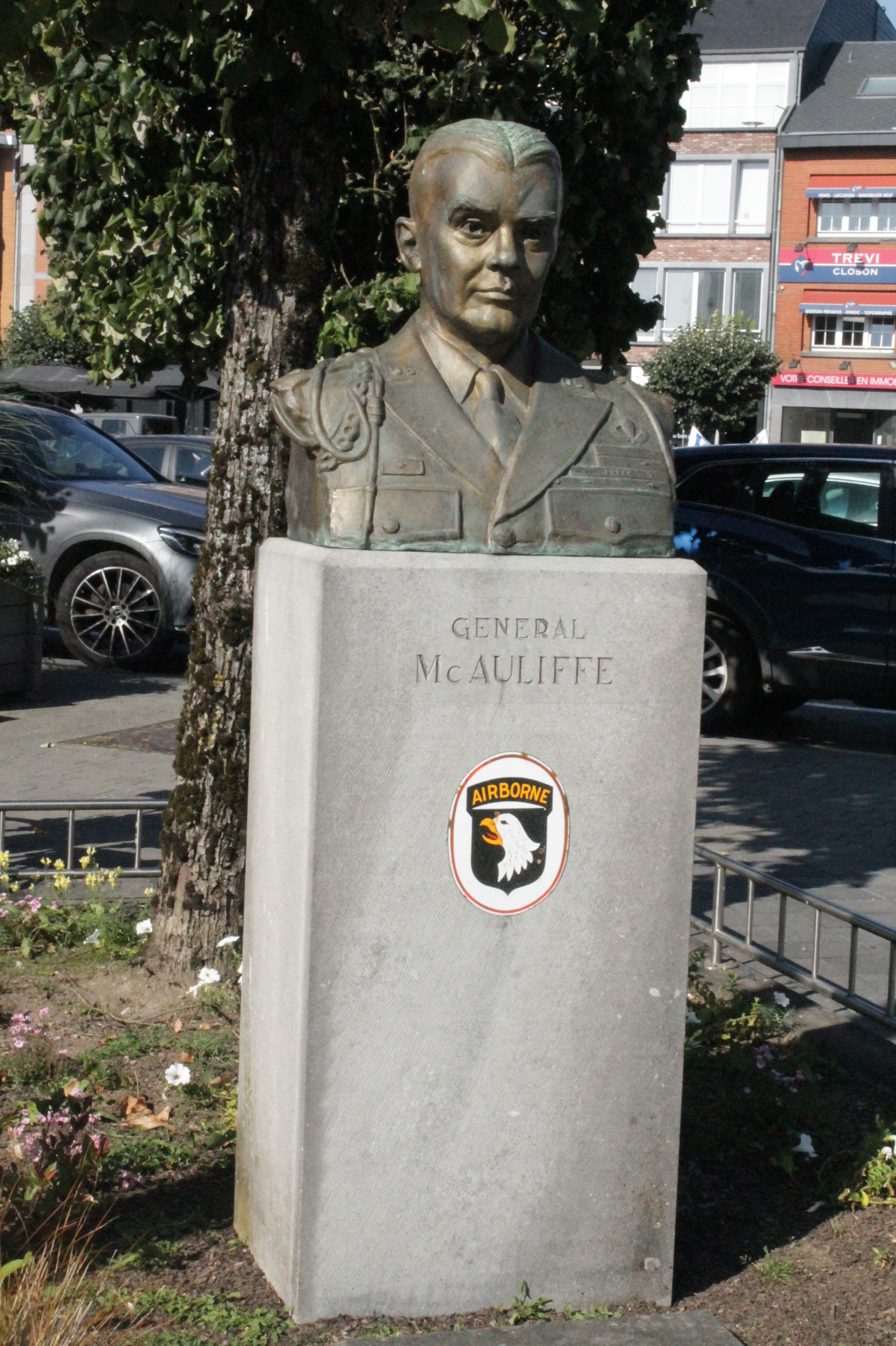
Monument to General McAuliffe, Bastogne

Following the war, McAuliffe held many positions, including chief chemical officer of the Army Chemical Corps, and G-1, head of Army personnel. He returned to Europe as commander of the Seventh Army in 1953, and commander-in-chief of the United States Army Europe in 1955. He was promoted to four-star general in 1955.

While still in the service, McAuliffe attended the premier of Battleground in Washington D.C. on 9 November 1949. The film did not depict McAuliffe directly, but did show a scene of the Germans presenting their surrender demands and their confusion on receiving McAuliffe's reply.

== Retirement ==
In 1956, McAuliffe retired from the army. He worked for American Cyanamid Corporation from 1956 to 1963 as vice president for personnel. He began a program to teach employees to maintain contact with local politicians. The company subsequently required all branch managers to at least introduce themselves to local politicians. McAuliffe also served as chairman of the New York State Civil Defense Commission from 1960 to 1963.

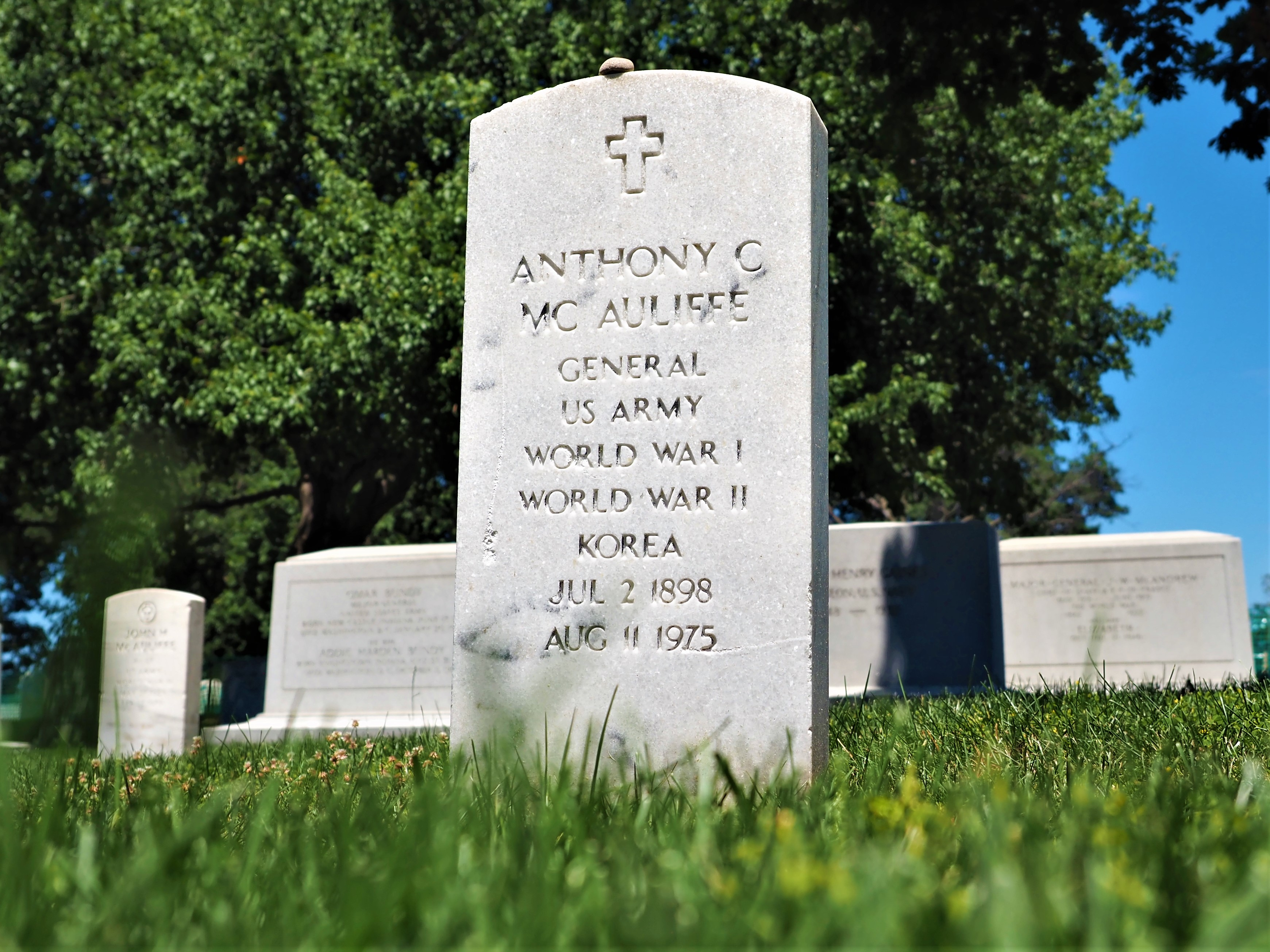
General Anthony McAuliffe gravesite at Arlington National Cemetery

After his retirement from American Cyanamid in 1963, McAuliffe resided in Chevy Chase, Maryland, until his death from leukemia on 10 August 1975, age 77. He is buried in Arlington National Cemetery.

== Dates of rank ==
Insignia	Rank	Component	Date
No insignia	Cadet	United States Military Academy	14 June 1917
	Second lieutenant	National Army	1 November 1918
	First lieutenant	National Army	29 September 1919
	Second lieutenant	Regular Army	15 December 1922
	First lieutenant	Regular Army	20 May 1923
	Captain	Regular Army	1 May 1935
	Major	Regular Army	1 July 1940
	Lieutenant colonel	Army of the United States	15 September 1941 effective 18 September
	Colonel	Army of the United States	1 February 1942
	Brigadier general	Army of the United States	8 August 1942
	Lieutenant colonel	Regular Army	11 December 1942
	Major general	Army of the United States	3 January 1945
	Brigadier general	Regular Army	24 January 1948
	Major general	Regular Army	27 September 1949
	Lieutenant general	Army of the United States	1 August 1951
	General	Army of the United States	1 March 1955
	General	Regular Army, Retired	31 May 1956

== Awards and decorations ==
McAuliffe's decorations include the following:

=== Badges ===
Basic Parachutist Badge with three combat jumps
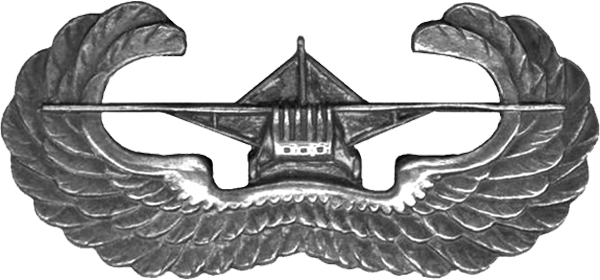
Airborne Glider Badge

=== Decorations ===
Distinguished Service Cross
Army Distinguished Service Medal with bronze oak leaf cluster
Silver Star
Legion of Merit
Bronze Star Medal with bronze oak leaf cluster

=== Unit award ===
Army Presidential Unit Citation

=== Service medals ===
World War I Victory Medal
American Defense Service Medal
American Campaign Medal
European-African-Middle Eastern Campaign Medal with Arrowhead device and three bronze campaign stars
World War II Victory Medal
Army of Occupation Medal
National Defense Service Medal

=== Foreign awards ===
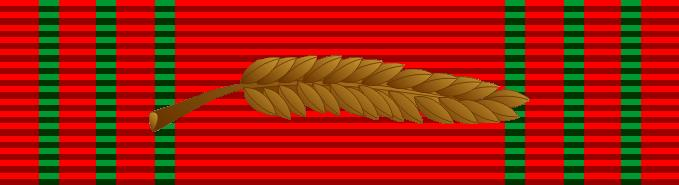
Legion of Honour (Commandeur)
French Croix de guerre with Palm
Belgian Croix de guerre with Palm
Netherlands Bronze Lion Medal

Distinguished Service Order with clasp
Belgian Order of Leopold (Commandeur)
Order of the Oak Crown (Commandeur)

== Memorials ==
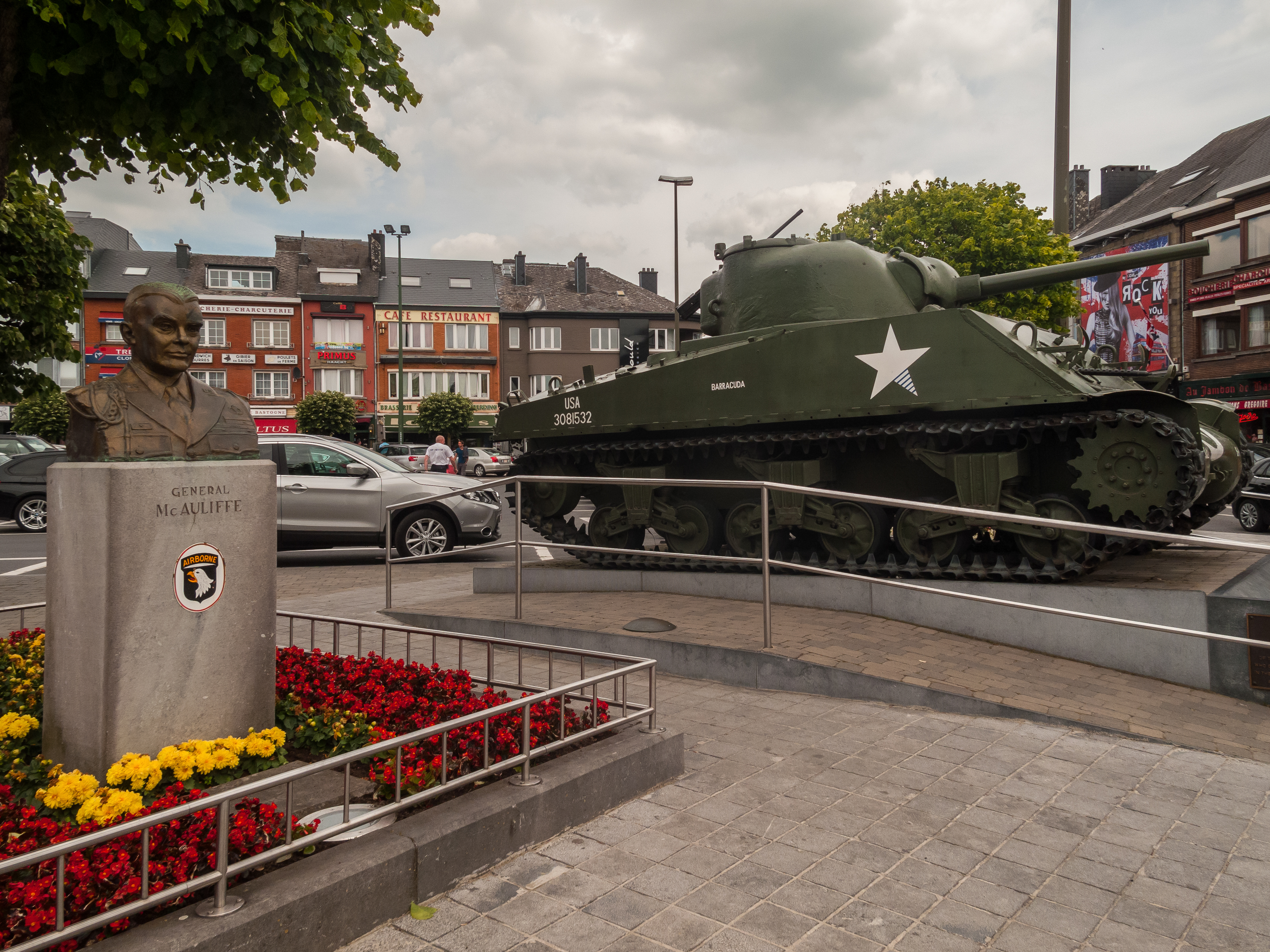
Bust of Gen. McAuliffe with Sherman tank, Bastogne, Belgium

The central square of Bastogne, Belgium, is named Place Général McAuliffe. A Sherman tank, pierced by a German 88 mm shell, stands in one corner.

A southern extension of Route 33 in eastern Northampton County, Pennsylvania, completed in 2002, was named the Gen. Anthony Clement McAuliffe 101st Airborne Memorial Highway.

The new headquarters building for the 101st Airborne Division, which opened in 2009 at Fort Campbell, Kentucky, is named McAuliffe Hall.

A room at the Thayer Hotel at West Point has been dedicated to General McAuliffe.

== Bibliography ==
- McAuliffe, Tom (2022). Nuts! The Life and Times of General Tony McAuliffe. Next Stop Paradise Publishing. ISBN 979-8986451107.

Military offices
Preceded by Charles C. Haffner, Jr.	Commanding General 103rd Infantry Division; January–July 1945	Succeeded by John N. Robinson
Preceded by Leroy H. Watson	Commanding General 79th Infantry Division; July–August 1945	Succeeded by Leroy H. Watson
Preceded by William M. Hoge	Commanding General Seventh Army; 1953–1955	Succeeded by Henry I. Hodes
Preceded by William M. Hoge	Commanding General United States Army Europe; 1955–1956	Succeeded by Henry I. Hodes
