= Clyde D. Eddleman =

United States Army general (1902–1992)

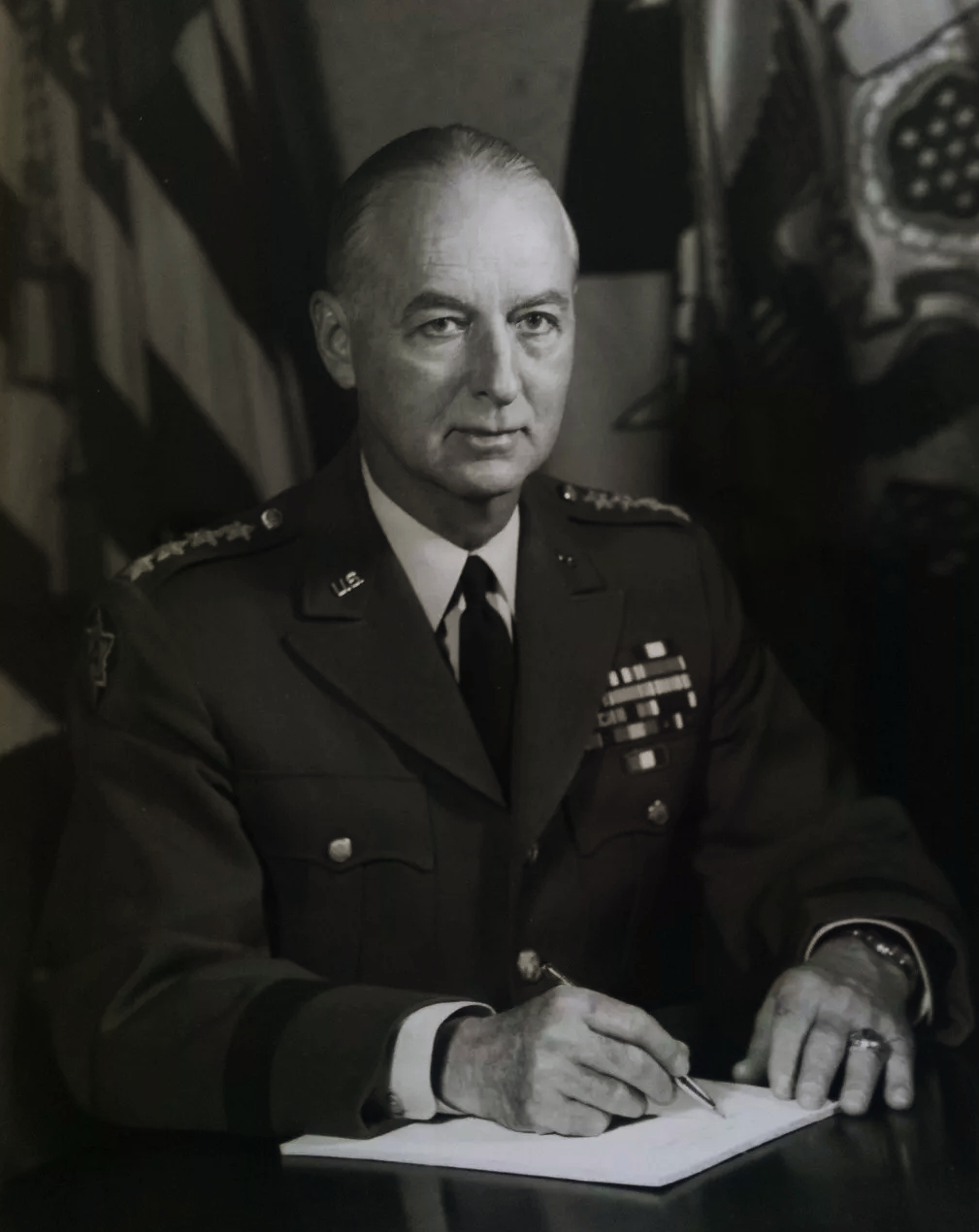
- General Clyde D. Eddleman
- Born: 17 January 1902; Orange, Texas, United States
- Died: 19 August 1992 (aged 90); Washington, D.C., United States
- Burial place: Arlington National Cemetery
- Military career
- Allegiance: United States
- Branch: United States Army
- Service years: 1924–1962
- Rank: General
- Service number: 0-15842
- Unit: Infantry Branch
- Commands: Vice Chief of Staff of the United States Army; United States Army Europe; Seventh United States Army; United States Army War College; 4th Infantry Division
- Conflicts: World War II
- Awards: Army Distinguished Service Medal (2); Silver Star; Legion of Merit; Bronze Star Medal
- Other work: Vice President, Universal Match Corporation; Board of Directors, Army and Air Force Mutual Aid Association

Clyde Davis Eddleman (17 January 1902 – 19 August 1992) was a United States Army four-star general who served as commander, United States Army Europe from 1959 to 1960, and as Vice Chief of Staff of the United States Army from 1960 to 1962.

== Military career ==
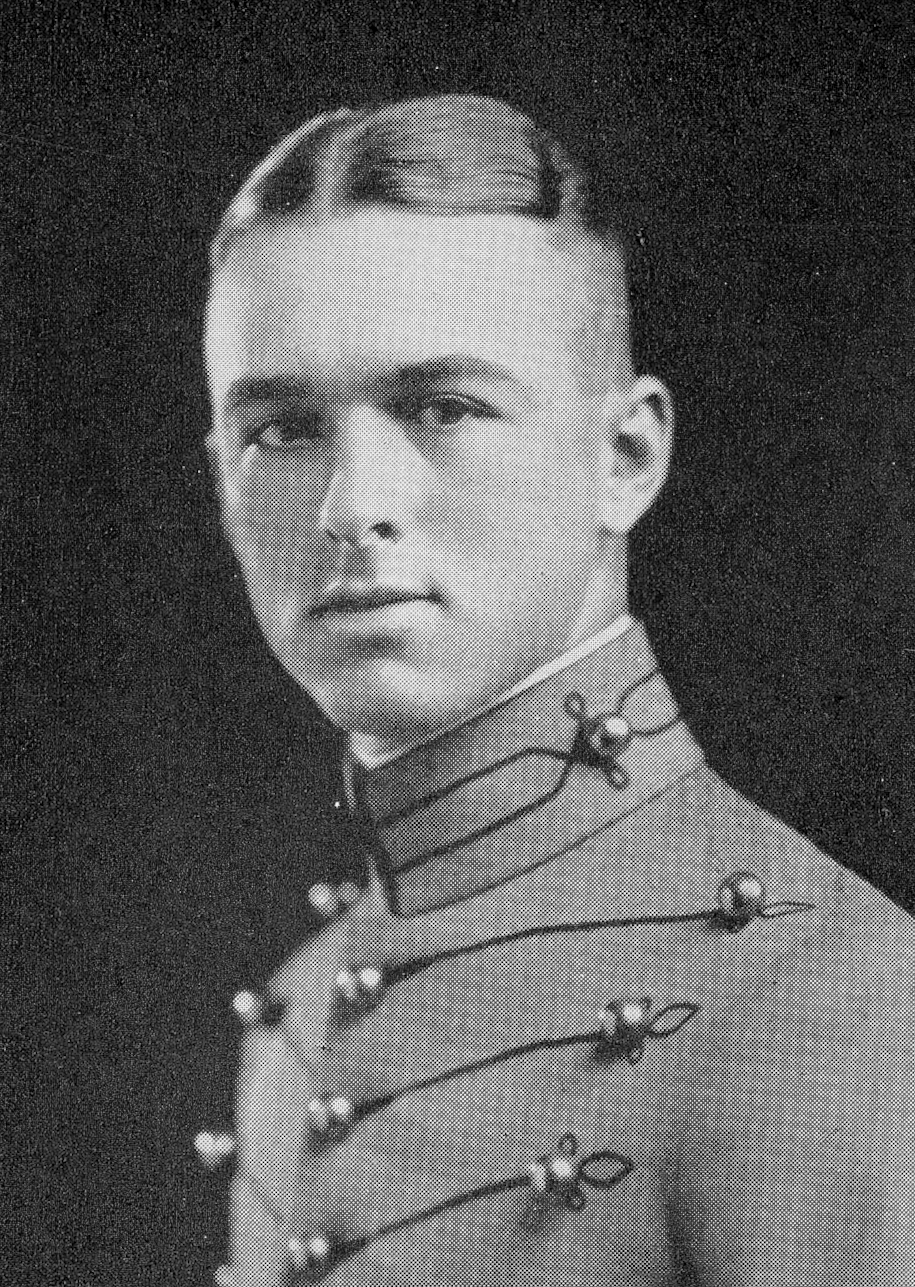
At West Point in 1924

Eddleman was born on 17 January 1902, in Orange, Texas. He graduated from Lake Charles High School in Lake Charles, Louisiana in 1919. In 1924 he graduated from the United States Military Academy, receiving his commission in the Infantry.

Eddleman went to Australia with General Walter Krueger in early 1943 as assistant chief of staff, G-3, and remained there until 1945. He participated in all of Sixth United States Army's campaigns, including the occupation of Japan. He was awarded the Army Distinguished Service Medal for his activities in the Leyte and Luzon Campaigns, and the Silver Star for reconnaissance under fire at Biak, Leyte, and Manila. He was promoted to brigadier general at the Leyte beachhead.

Because of his familiarity with joint operations, Eddleman was selected by General Douglas MacArthur to become a member of the Joint Operations Review Board from January to June 1946. He was then selected to be the first deputy commandant of the Armed Forces Staff College. He was chairman of the faculty board and director of instruction of the school for the first four classes.

Eddleman arrived in Trieste in June 1949 to become deputy commander of Trieste United States Troops (TRUST), and director general, civil affairs, Allied Military Government. He remained in this assignment for over a year.

In November 1950 Eddleman was recalled to Washington to become chief of Plans Division, G-3, and later G-3 of the army. He remained in that position until 1954. In May of that year, he assumed command of the 4th Infantry Division, at the time headquartered in Frankfurt, Germany. In May 1955, he was reassigned as commandant of the Army War College, staying in that position only four months until he was moved to deputy chief of staff for military operations and operations deputy for Joint Chiefs of Staff activities. He then assumed command of the Seventh United States Army in Germany on 1 July 1958. Nine months later he was promoted to four-star rank and assigned as Commander-in-Chief, United States Army, Europe, and remained there until 1 November 1960, when he became Vice Chief of Staff of the United States Army. He filled this position until his retirement on 31 March 1962.

== Awards ==
Eddleman's awards and decorations include the Army Distinguished Service Medal with oak leaf cluster, the Silver Star, the Legion of Merit, the Bronze Star Medal, and the Philippine Distinguished Service Star.

== Post military ==
After retiring from the army, Eddleman was a vice president of Universal Match Corporation for four years, later becoming director and corporate representative. He also was on the board of directors of the Army and Air Force Mutual Aid Association from 1962 to 1980, when he was elected chairman of the board, a position he filled until 1982. Eddleman died at Walter Reed Army Medical Center on 19 August 1992, survived by his wife, Lorraine Heath Eddleman (1904–1999), and one son, John Heath Eddleman. He and Lorraine are now buried at Arlington National Cemetery.

Military offices
Preceded by Henry I. Hodes	Commanding General of the Seventh United States Army; 1956–1959	Succeeded by Bruce C. Clarke
Preceded by Henry I. Hodes	Commanding General of United States Army Europe; 1959–1960	Succeeded by Bruce C. Clarke
Preceded by George Decker	Vice Chief of Staff of the United States Army; 1960–1962	Succeeded by Barksdale Hamlett
