= Arthur S. Collins Jr. =

United States Army general

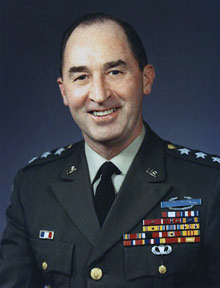
- Born: August 6, 1915; Boston, Massachusetts, U.S.
- Died: January 7, 1984 (aged 68); Washington, D.C., U.S.
- Burial place: West Point Cemetery
- Military career
- Allegiance: United States
- Branch: United States Army
- Service years: 1938–1974
- Rank: Lieutenant General
- Commands: I Field Force, Vietnam; 4th Infantry Division; 130th Infantry Regiment
- Conflicts: World War II; Vietnam War
- Awards: Distinguished Service Medal (4); Silver Star; Legion of Merit (2); Bronze Star Medal (3); Air Medal (3)

Arthur Sylvester Collins Jr. (August 6, 1915 – January 7, 1984) was a United States Army lieutenant general who served as commander of I Field Force, Vietnam during the Vietnam War.

== Early life and education ==
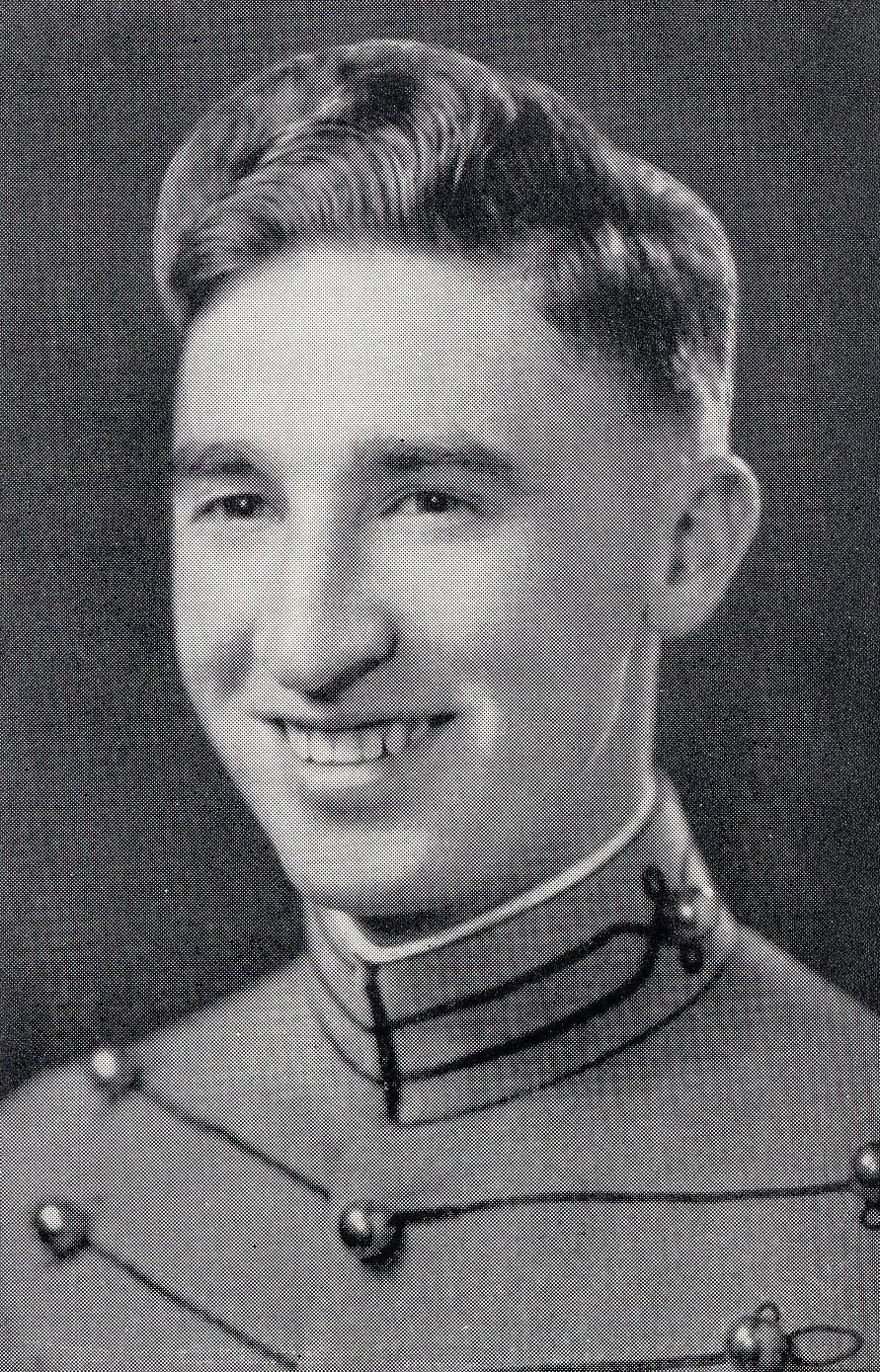
Collins as a United States Military Academy cadet c. 1938

Collins was born on 6 August 1915 in the Mission Hill section of Boston, Massachusetts and attended Boston Latin School. He graduated from the United States Military Academy, West Point, New York, with a Bachelor of Science degree in 1938 and was commissioned as a second lieutenant in the infantry. Collins later graduated from the Army War College in 1953. He also earned an M.A. degree in international affairs from George Washington University in 1964.

== Military career ==
In May 1942 Collins was appointed as battalion commander of the 1st Battalion, 130th Infantry Regiment. In May 1944 the 130th Infantry deployed to Finschhafen in New Guinea. In August 1944 Collins assumed command of the 130th Infantry, commanding the regiment during the Battle of Morotai and Battle of Luzon, where the 130th Infantry participated in the capture of Baguio. The 130th Infantry then participated in the Occupation of Japan, landing there in September 1945.

In June 1965 Collins was appointed as commander of the 4th Infantry Division and led it during its deployment to South Vietnam in August 1966 and remained in command until January 1967.

In January 1970 Collins was appointed to command I Field Force, Vietnam, which he commanded from February 1970 to January 1971. Upon reviewing some of the more optimistic portions of his predecessor General William R. Peers' debriefing report, he questioned the existence of any discernible progress during the past two years. "Frankly," Collins observed, "I do not know what happened between 1968–1970," believing that "if the ARVN combat units had improved as much as indicated by General Peers, somewhere along the line they had again slipped back a long way." Upon his arrival in February 1970, Collins judged that the local Vietnamese forces were "woefully weak because of lack of leadership at the regimental and battalion level," and he exhibited little of Peers' optimism.

Collins served as acting Commanding General, United States Army Europe from 20 March to 26 May 1971. He retired from the army in July 1974.

Collins lived in Alexandria, Virginia after retirement. He contracted cancer and died on 7 January 1984 at the Walter Reed Army Medical Center in Washington, D.C. Collins was buried at the West Point Cemetery on 11 January 1984.
