= Line of departure =

Starting position for an attack on enemy positions

In the military, a line of departure or start line is the starting position for an attack on enemy positions.
