= Henry I. Hodes =

United States Army general

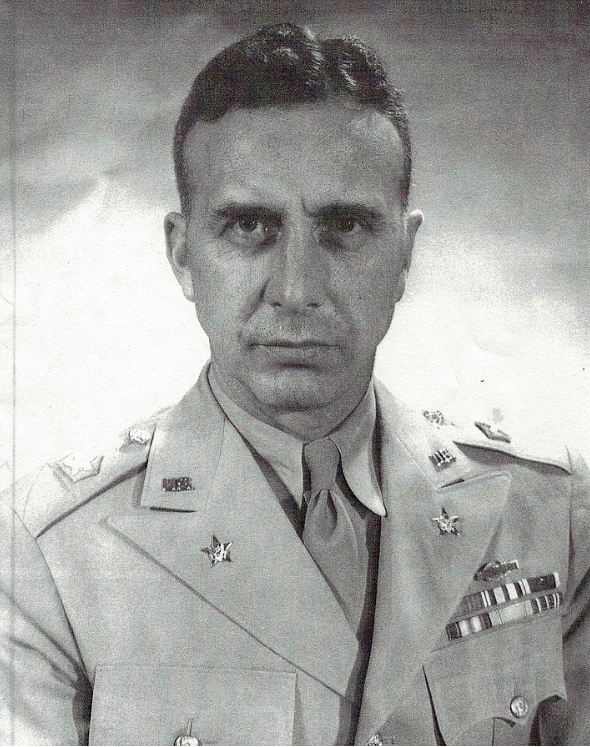
- Henry I. Hodes pictured as brigadier general
- Born: 19 March 1899; Washington, D.C., U.S.
- Died: 14 February 1962 (aged 62); San Antonio, Texas, U.S.
- Burial place: Fort Sam Houston National Cemetery
- Military career
- Allegiance: United States
- Branch: United States Army
- Service years: 1920–1959
- Rank: General
- Service number: 0-12845
- Unit: Cavalry Branch
- Commands: United States Army Europe; Seventh United States Army; Command and General Staff College; 24th Infantry Division; 112th Infantry Regiment
- Conflicts: World War I World War II; Korean War
- Awards: Army Distinguished Service Medal (3); Silver Star (2); Legion of Merit (2); Bronze Star Medal (2); Air Medal; Purple Heart (2)

Henry Irving Hodes (19 March 1899 – 14 February 1962) was a United States Army four-star general who served as Commander in Chief, United States Army Europe/Commander, Central Army Group from 1956 to 1959.

== Military career/biography ==
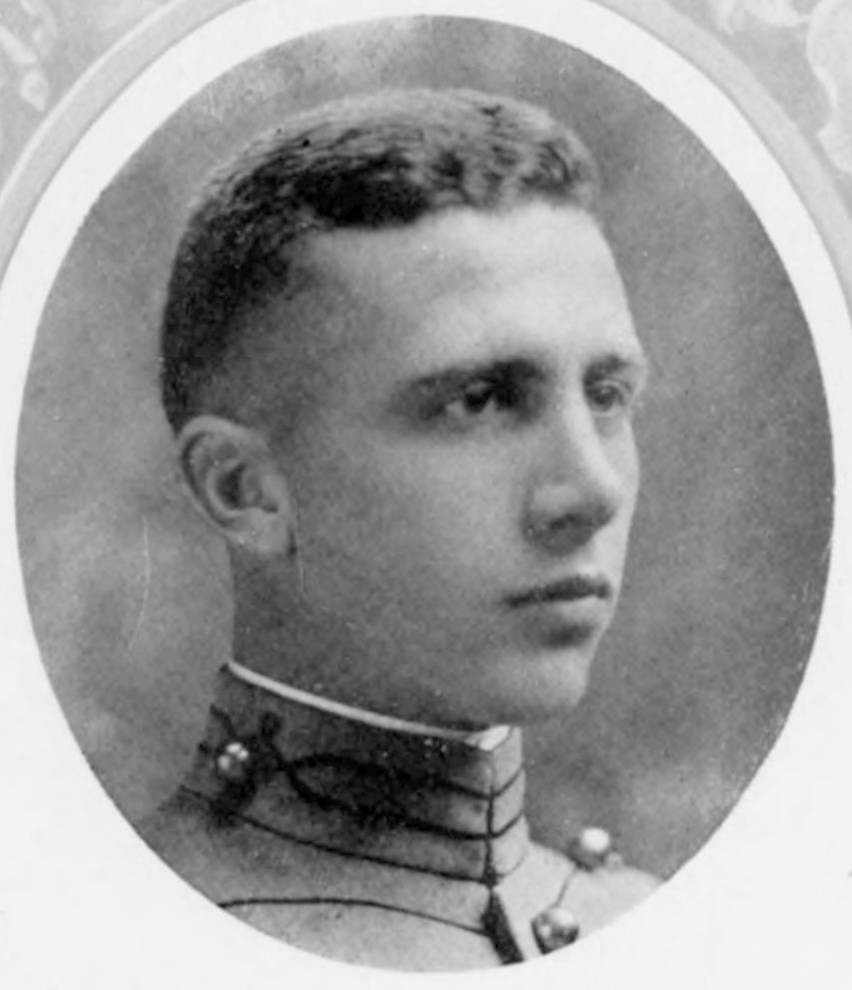
At West Point in 1920

Henry I. Hodes was born in Washington, D.C., on 19 March 1899.

He graduated from the United States Military Academy in 1920. Hodes began his military career in the horse mounted cavalry, in the Wyoming and Texas wilderness. He led the United States Army into the mechanized age of trucks, cars, jeeps, tanks, and airplanes. He attempted flying, but gave it up after a couple of crashes. His military career accelerated in World War II, which found him in the middle of war planning in Washington, D.C.

He was wounded twice in World War II, while serving with the 112th Infantry Regiment in France and Belgium. He returned to the war after receiving a shoulder wound, but was sent back to the US after receiving a head wound on 20 September 1944, which required hospitalization. Hodes became a brigadier general on 25 January 1945. Other assignments included Assistant Deputy Chief of Staff, United States Army from 1945 to 1949, Assistant Commanding General, 1st Cavalry Division in 1949.

He served in the Korean War, where he was given the nickname "Hammering Hank". He served first as a field commander and later as a representative at Panmunjom – the Armistice Agreement with North Korea. His assignments during the war included Assistant Commanding General 7th Division from 1950 to 1951; Deputy Commanding General Eighth United States Army, 1951–52; and Commanding General 24th Division in 1952. He served as Commandant of the Command and General Staff College from 1952 to 1954, and was Commanding General, Seventh United States Army from 1954 to 1956. After serving in Korea, he returned to Germany. His service in post-war Europe was vital in the rebuilding efforts and designing defensive strategies opposite the communist Russians in East Germany and the Czech Republic, during the early 1950s.

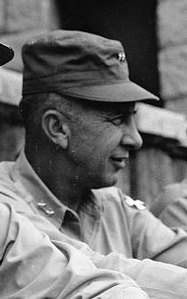
Major General Hodes on the steps of "U.N. House" at Kaesong, Korea, during the early days of the Armistice talks

He was promoted to the rank of general on 1 June 1956, and served as Commander in Chief, U.S. Army Europe and Commander, Central Army Group for NATO until his retirement from the Army on March 31, 1959.

He retired after serving more than 40 years in the US Army. He suffered from amyotrophic lateral sclerosis (ALS) and died at Brooke General Hospital in San Antonio, Texas on 14 February 1962. He was buried in Fort Sam Houston National Cemetery.

== Personal life ==
He had two daughters and one son, Col John Taylor Hodes, US Army (Ret). John served in Korea and three consecutive tours of duty in Vietnam.

== Military awards ==

Combat Infantryman Badge
1st Row		Army Distinguished Service Medal with two Oak Leaf Clusters		
2nd Row	Silver Star with Oak Leaf Cluster	Legion of Merit with Oak Leaf Cluster	Bronze Star Medal with Oak Leaf Cluster	Air Medal
3rd Row	Purple Heart with Oak Leaf Cluster	World War I Victory Medal	American Defense Service Medal	American Campaign Medal
4th Row	European-African-Middle Eastern Campaign Medal with two campaign stars	World War Two Victory Medal	National Defense Service Medal	Korean Service Medal with eight campaign stars
5th Row	United Nations Service Medal	Distinguished Service Order (United Kingdom)	Order of Military Merit (Korea) (Class Unknown)	Korean War Service Medal

Military offices
Preceded by Anthony McAuliffe	Commanding General of United States Army Europe; 1956–1959	Succeeded by Clyde D. Eddleman
Preceded by Anthony McAuliffe	Commanding General of the Seventh United States Army; 1955–1956	Succeeded by Clyde D. Eddleman
Preceded by Horace L. McBride	Commandant of the Command and General Staff College; 1952–1954	Succeeded by Charles E. Beauchamp
