= Jesse Grant Chapline =

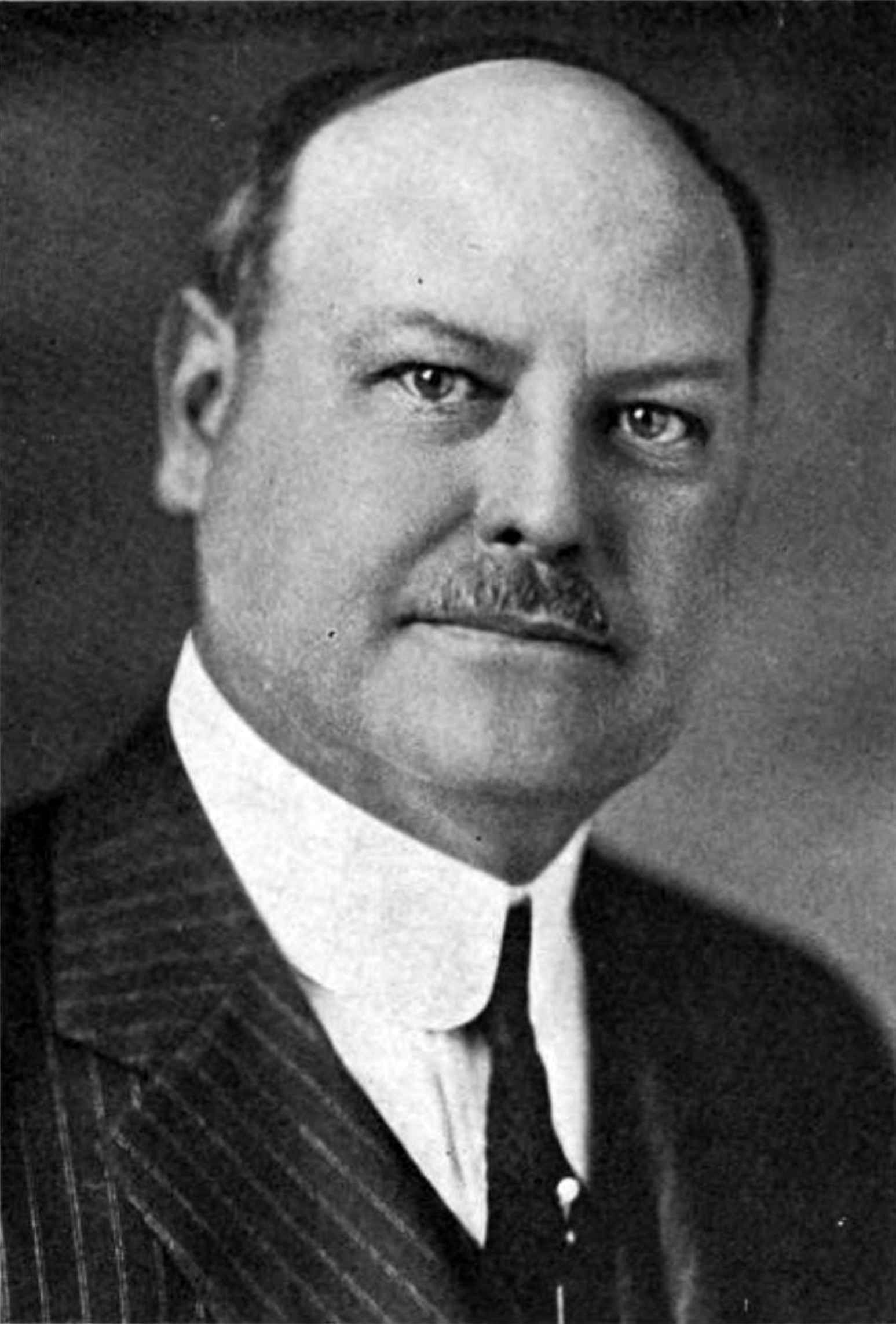
- Born: 13 January 1870; Waverly, Missouri
- Died: 4 July 1937 (aged 67); Chicago, Illinois
- Occupation: Educator
- Known for: Founded La Salle Extension University

Jesse Grant Chapline (13 January 1870 – 4 July 1937) was an American educator and politician who founded the distance learning facility La Salle Extension University (LSEU) in Chicago, Illinois.

== Life and career ==
Born in Waverly, Missouri, Chapline graduated from Saint Louis College. He founded LSEU in 1908. Chapline hired Napoleon Hill as LSEU's advertising manager and is acknowledged as an inspiration in Hill's best-seller Think and Grow Rich.

He served as director of the Commercial Research Association, manager of John Wanamaker's Century Club in Philadelphia, and president of the Associated Publishing Company. Chapline died in Chicago, Illinois in 1937.
