= La Salle Extension University =

Private university in Illinois, United States

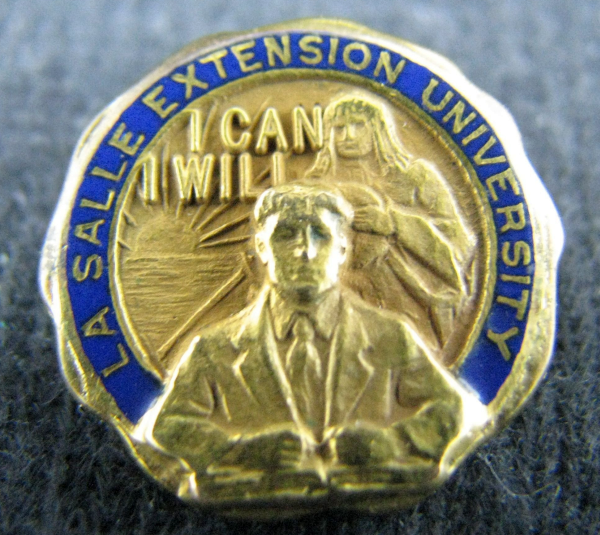
- Type: Private university
- Active: 1908–1982
- Founder: Jesse Grant Chapline
- Location: 417 South Dearborn Street, Chicago, Illinois, United States; 41.8764°N 87.6290°W
- Campus: Urban

La Salle Extension University (LSEU), also styled as LaSalle Extension University, was a nationally accredited private university based in Chicago, Illinois. Although the school offered resident educational programs in classes and seminars their primary mode of delivery was by way of distance learning. LSEU was in operation from 1908 until 1982.

== History ==
La Salle Extension University was founded by Jesse Grant Chapline in 1908, and was incorporated under the laws of the State of Illinois. It was originally located at 4046 S. Michigan Avenue (41st Street & Michigan). Early courses were business-oriented and included accounting and law. By 1911, LSEU was advertising that over 10,000 students had enrolled.

The university was an early pioneer in distance learning. LSEU was accredited by the National Home Study Council and the State of Illinois to grant academic degrees for completion of distance study programs. LSEU focused on business and vocational training, offering Associate's degrees and Bachelor's degrees, as well as a Bachelor of Laws degree during much of its operation.

In 1937, the Federal Trade Commission ordered that LSEU cease and desist from representing that the school was a university. The FTC found that "while many of the respondent's courses of instruction were of college grade, the institution itself was not a university and did not possess the qualities and attributes considered by educators and the public generally as requisites necessary to be possessed by an institution to make it a university or to entitle it to be designated as such." The restrictions were eased a year later.

In 1944, LSEU relocated its administrative offices to the Chicago Loop at 417 S. Dearborn Street.

=== Mergers ===
Crowell-Collier Publishing Company acquired Macmillan Company in 1960. In 1961, Crowell-Collier acquired LSEU.

LSEU enrolled more than 100,000 students in 1969 and received approximately $50,000,000 in gross revenue. In 1969, Crowell, Collier Macmillan, Inc. and other corporations with distance learning subsidiaries filed suit against the National Home Study Council for monopoly and restraint of trade.

=== Later years ===
In the university's later years, the school became known for its aggressive advertising practices. Most notable was the university's use of advertising on paraphernalia such as matchbooks, ink pens and pencils and in various types of magazines, with a grinning graduate and the famous headline "Look who's smiling now!"

LSEU was involved in several lawsuits and counter-suits by the Federal Trade Commission over the law degree it advertised. In 1973, La Salle Extension University was charged by FTC (D. 5907) for "involving misrepresentations about obtaining law degrees through a correspondence course." FTC ordered that the university be required to include a disclaimer in advertisements for its law distance program that read: "No state accepts any law home study course, including La Salle's, as sufficient education to qualify for admission to practice law." La Salle Extension University closed its law school program in 1980 following the litigation involving the FTC.

=== After closure ===
After it closed, LSEU turned over records to the Illinois State Board of Education. LSEU resources were absorbed into Macmillan Publishing Company, which was later taken over by Robert Maxwell in 1989. Following bankruptcy, the assets were sold to Paramount Communications Inc. in 1994. They eventually became part of Simon & Schuster in 1994. Pearson acquired the Macmillan name in America since 1998, following its purchase of the Simon & Schuster educational and professional group (which included various Macmillan properties). Holtzbrinck purchased it from them in 2001.

== Alumni ==
Founder Jesse Grant Chapline recruited a number of prominent figures to be involved in the school, including Adlai E. Stevenson I.

La Salle Extension University was innovative for the time in providing many poor, working-class, women, and ethnic minorities educational opportunities. Several of its graduates have gone on to make significant contributions, especially in the fields of law, business, accounting, marketing and social work. Alumni have included figures in state and local political administrations, and a spectrum of US military officials. Alumni include KFC founder Harland Sanders, governors Harold J. Arthur and Eurith D. Rivers, United States Senator Craig L. Thomas, U.S. Representatives John S. Gibson and William T. Granahan, French commando Philippe Kieffer, and a number of prominent African American leaders, including Arthur Fletcher, Jessie M. Rattley, and Gertrude Rush.
