= Robert Cannon =

Robert Cannon may refer to:

- Robert Cannon (Behram Pasha) (1811–1882), British lieutenant general
- Robert Cannon (triple jumper) (born 1958), American Olympic athlete
- Robert Cannon (animator) (1909–1964), American animator and film director
- Robert C. Cannon (1917–2008), American judge, Milwaukee Brewers executive
- Robert Milchrist Cannon (1901–1976), United States Army Lieutenant General
