= Charles D. Palmer =

United States Army general

Charles Day Palmer
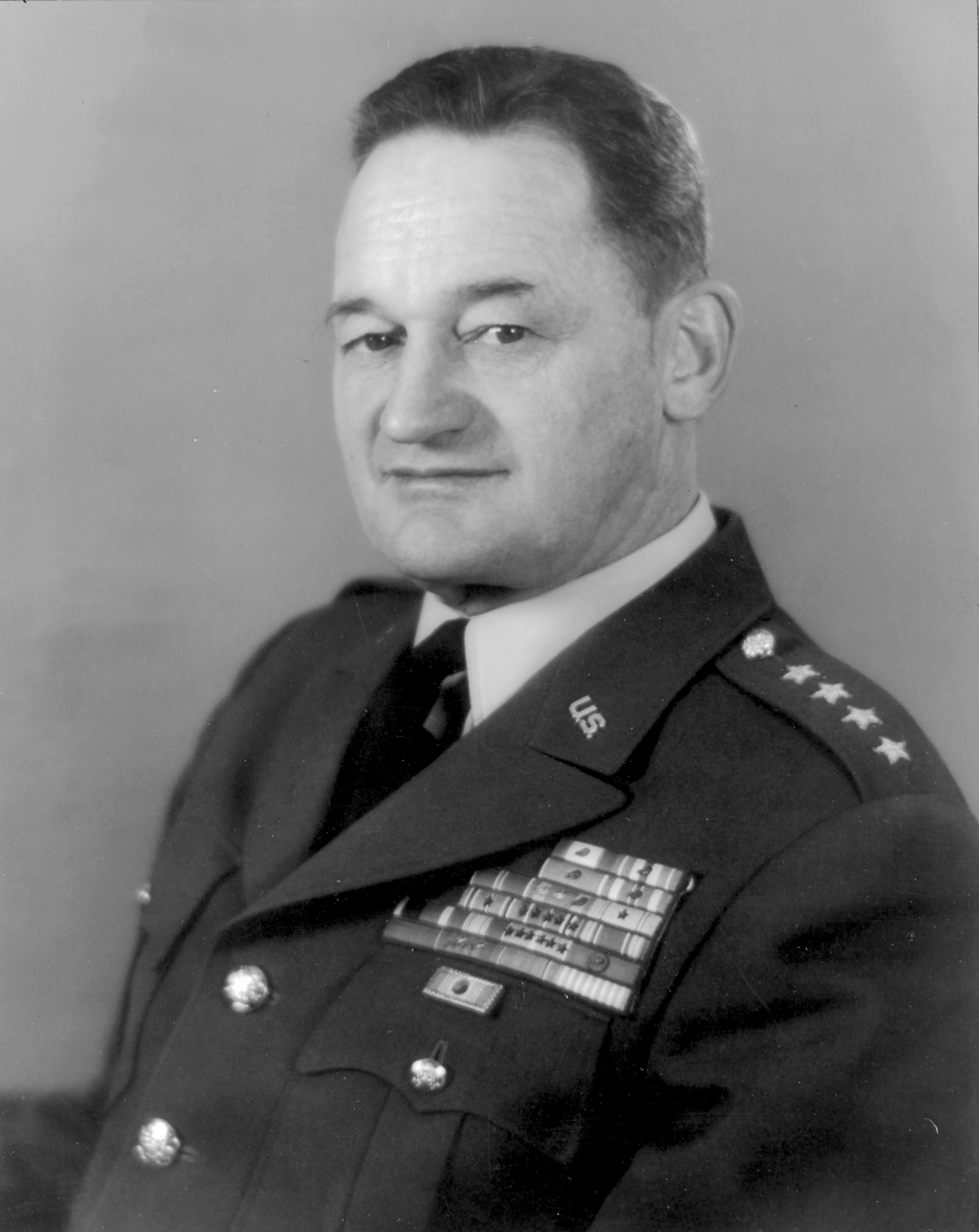
- Palmer on undated photograph
- Born: 20 February 1902; Chicago, Illinois, United States
- Died: 7 June 1999 (aged 97); Washington, D.C., United States
- Burial place: Arlington National Cemetery, Virginia, United States
- Relatives: William E. Birkhimer (grandfather); Williston B. Palmer (brother)
- Military career
- Allegiance: United States
- Branch: United States Army
- Service years: 1924–1962
- Rank: General
- Service number: 0-15519
- Unit: Field Artillery Branch
- Commands: Sixth United States Army; 1st Cavalry Division
- Conflicts: World War II; Korean War
- Awards: Army Distinguished Service Medal (3); Silver Star (2); Legion of Merit; Distinguished Flying Cross (2); Bronze Star Medal
- Other work: Military consultant

General Charles Day Palmer Jr. (20 February 1902 – 7 June 1999) was a senior United States Army officer who served as Deputy Commander in Chief, United States European Command from 1959 to 1962. His brother, Williston B. Palmer, was also a four-star general, and his grandfather, William E. Birkhimer, was a general and Medal of Honor recipient.

== Early life ==
Palmer was born in Chicago, Illinois on 20 February 1902. After graduating from Washington High School in Washington, D.C., he entered the United States Military Academy, graduating in 1924.

== Military career ==
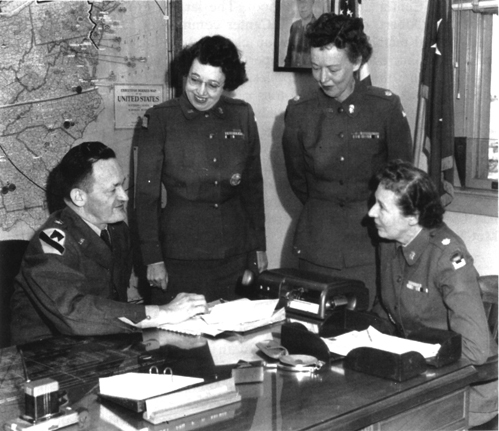
Charles D. Palmer talking to members of the Women's Army Corps, probably after the Korean War

As the United States entered World War II in December 1941, Palmer, then a major, was in the British West Indies working to establish military bases and on anti-submarine warfare projects. Palmer went to Europe in 1944 as chief of staff of the 2nd Armored Division, then commanded by Major General Edward H. Brooks, and continued in that role during the Normandy invasion, the breakout from Saint-Lô, and crossing the Siegfried Line.

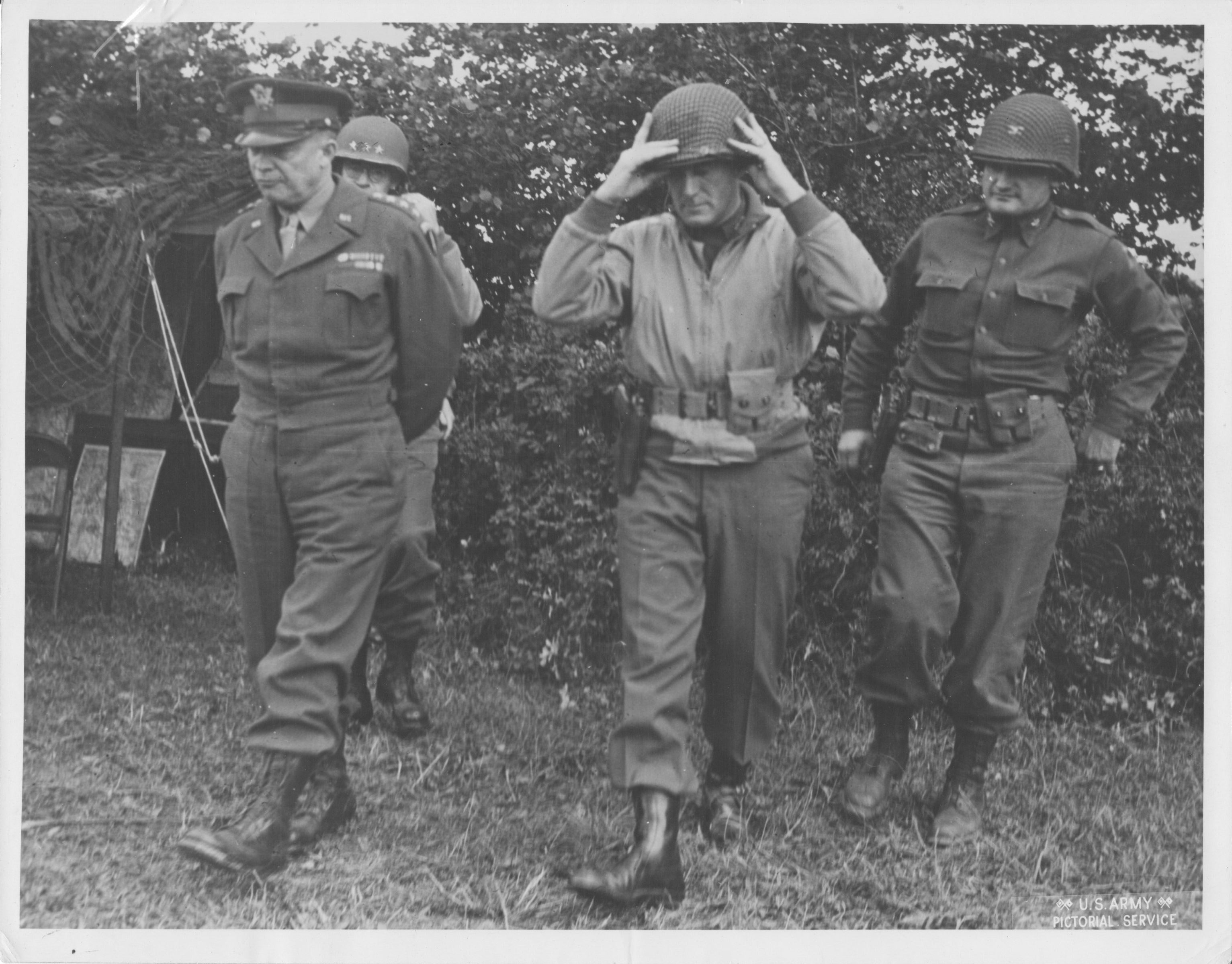
General Dwight D. Eisenhower walking with Major General Edward H. Brooks, sometime in 1944. Stood behind Eisenhower is Lieutenant General Omar Bradley while Colonel Charles D. Palmer is behind Brooks.

During Operation Dragoon, the Allied invasion of southern France in August 1944, he was chief of staff of the VI Corps, and during this time he received a battlefield promotion to brigadier general.

Palmer was with the 1st Cavalry Division in Japan on occupation duty when the Korean War erupted. He was the commander of the division artillery and later the division commander, participating in six campaigns.

Palmer's later posts included Commander, Sixth United States Army in California and Deputy Commander of United States forces in Europe. After serving as Deputy Commander in Chief, United States European Command, he retired in 1962.

=== Awards and decorations ===
Army Distinguished Service Medal with two oak leaf clusters
Silver Star with one oak leaf cluster
Legion of Merit
Distinguished Flying Cross
Bronze Star Medal
Air Medal

== Post military career ==
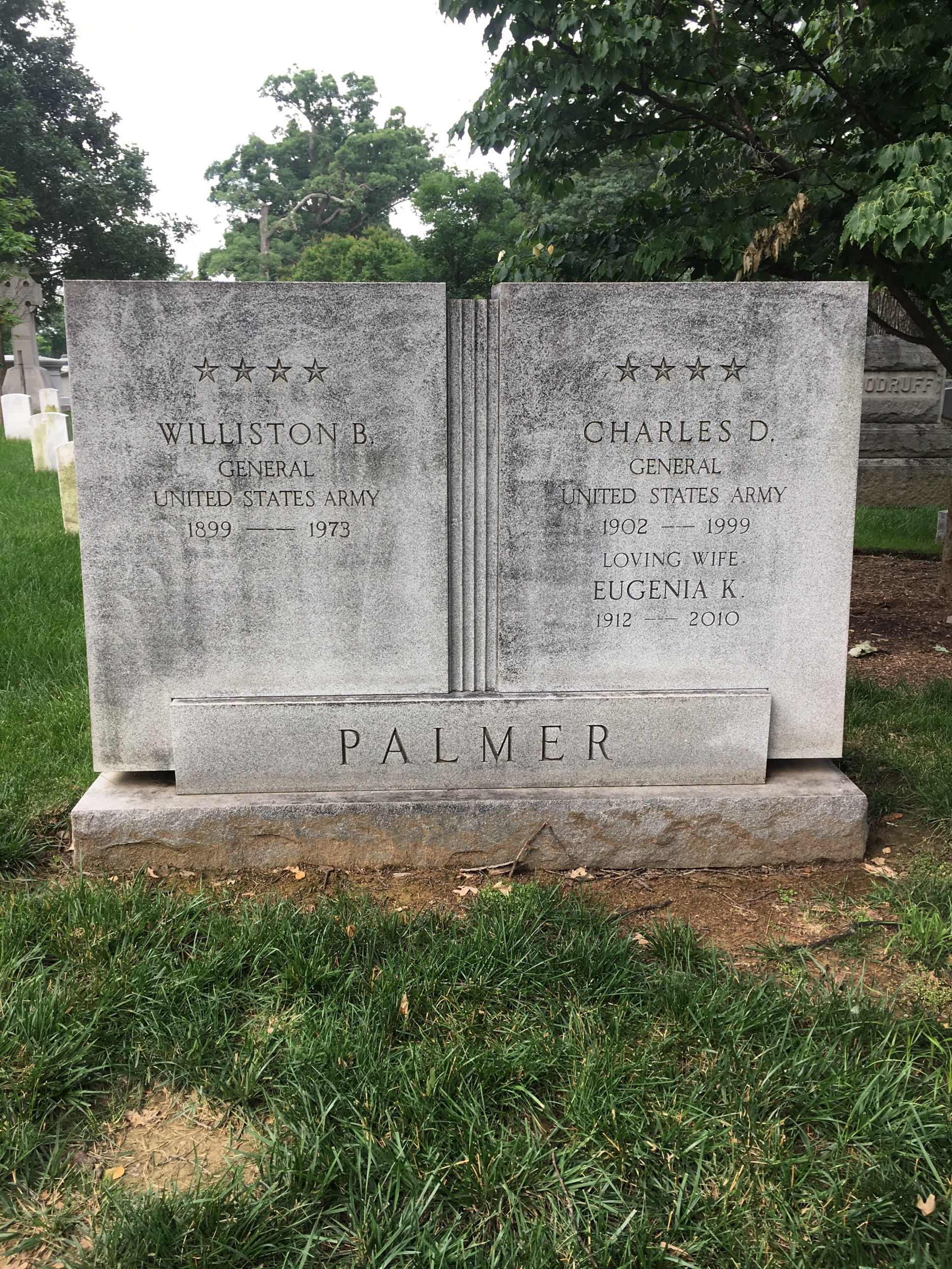
The grave of General Charles Day Palmer, Jr. at Arlington National Cemetery

After retiring from the army, Palmer settled in Washington and worked as a military consultant with the Research Analysis Corporation. He was also a director of both St. Albans School and the Retired Officers Association, and a member of the Army and Navy Club.

Palmer died in Washington, D.C., on 7 June 1999, at the age of 97 of cardiac arrest in his home in Knollwood, a military retirement community. He was survived by Eugenia Kingman Palmer, whom he married in 1954, and a son. He was buried in Arlington National Cemetery, next to his brother and wife Eugenia K.

Military offices
Preceded by Hobart R. Gay	Commanding General 1st Cavalry Division; February–July 1951	Succeeded by Thomas L. Harrold
Preceded by Lemuel Mathewson	Commanding General Sixth United States Army; 1958–1959	Succeeded by Robert M. Cannon
