= Williston B. Palmer =

United States Army general (1899–1973)

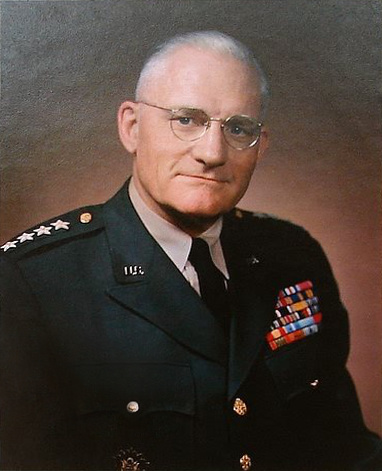
- General Palmer on an undated photograph
- Born: 11 November 1899; Chicago, Illinois, U.S.
- Died: 10 November 1973 (aged 73); Walter Reed Army Medical Center, U.S.
- Burial place: Arlington National Cemetery
- Relatives: Charles D. Palmer (brother); William E. Birkhimer (grandfather)
- Military career
- Allegiance: United States
- Branch: United States Army
- Service years: 1919–1962
- Rank: General
- Commands: X Corps; 2nd Armored Division; 82nd Airborne Division
- Conflicts: World War II; Korean War
- Awards: Army Distinguished Service Medal (4); Silver Star; Legion of Merit; Bronze Star Medal; Order of Kutuzov Second Class (Union of Soviet Socialist Republics)

Williston Birkhimer Palmer (11 November 1899 – 10 November 1973) was a United States Army four-star general who served as Vice Chief of Staff of the United States Army from 1955 to 1957; Deputy Commander in Chief, United States European Command from 1957 to 1959; and was the first Director of Military Assistance, 1959 to 1962. His brother, Charles D. Palmer, was also a four-star general, the first pair of brothers in United States Army history to achieve this, and his grandfather, William E. Birkhimer, was a brigadier general and Medal of Honor recipient.

== Military career ==
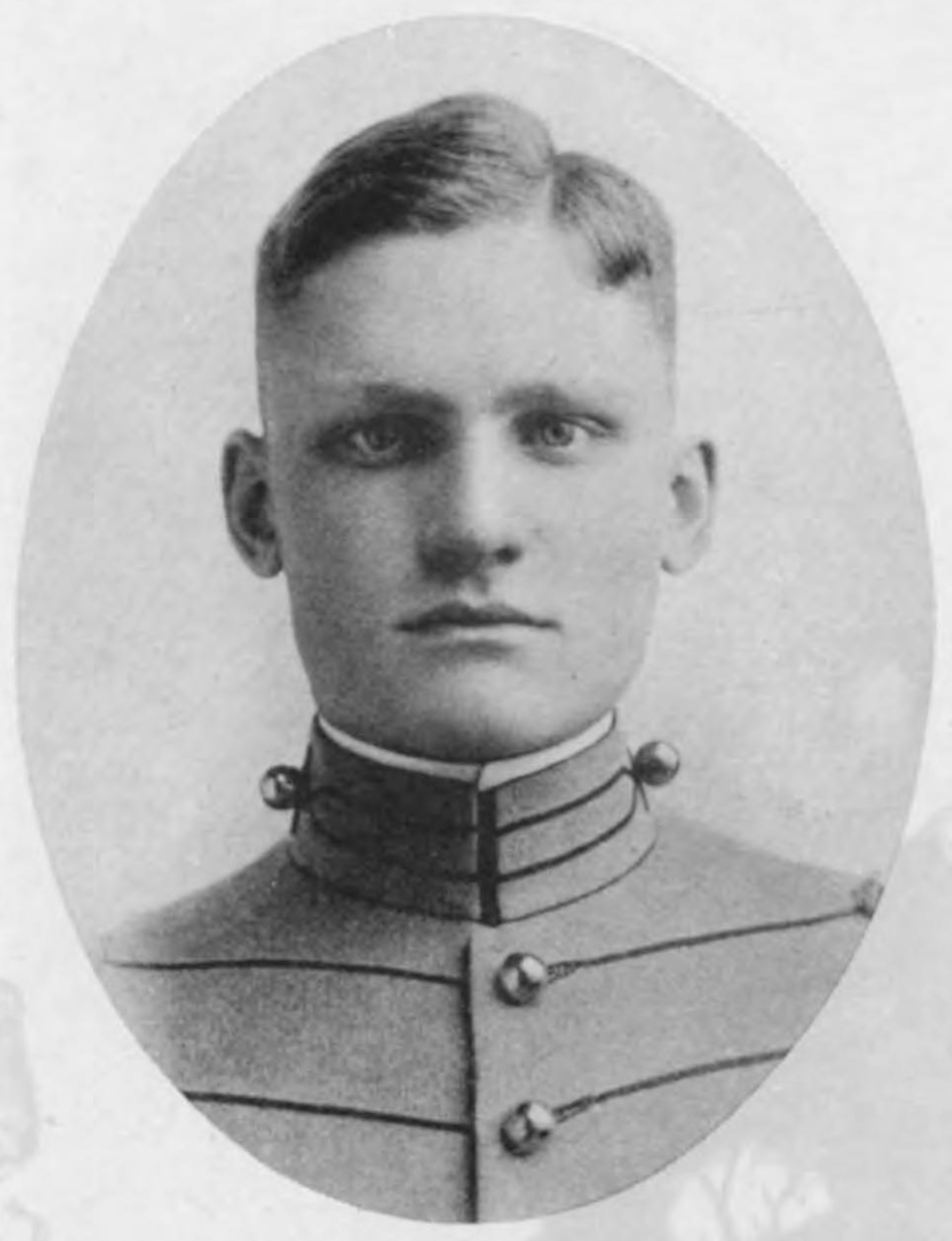
As a West Point cadet

Palmer was born in Chicago, Illinois on 11 November 1899, the oldest son of Colonel Charles Day Palmer. He graduated from the United States Military Academy in 1919 after an accelerated 3-year course.

During World War II, as a brigadier general, Palmer commanded VII Corps artillery, from the Normandy invasion to the Elbe. In January 1943 then Brigadier General Palmer was a passenger on a B-17 which landed in neutral Ireland. He was transferred across the border to Northern Ireland the next day.

Following the war Palmer served as Director of Logistics, European Command, commanded the 82nd Airborne Division in 1950, followed by command of the 2nd Armored Division in 1951 and X Corps in Korea later that same year. He was promoted to lieutenant general on 10 June 1952.

While commanding the 2nd Armored Division based at Stuttgart-Vaihingen in Germany during 1952, Palmer was instrumental in establishing the Seventh Army Symphony Orchestra with a young conductor from within his ranks: Corporal Samuel Adler. In accordance with Adler's suggestion, Palmer staffed the orchestra with professionally educated musicians from within the Army itself. During the course of the next decade, Palmer's "soldier-musician ambassadors" distinguished themselves throughout Europe by supporting America's cultural diplomacy initiatives during the height of the Cold War.

During his tenure as Director of Military Assistance, a scandal erupted over black market activities in Turkey involving military personnel. Palmer defended soldiers who refused to testify to the Senate by pointing out that the Uniform Code of Military Justice protected soldiers from self-incrimination.

Palmer caused controversy when, in October 1960, while visiting Saigon, he said the United States was suspending military aid to Laos because of the "confused situation" in there, saying "we have not been sure who is responsible for anything." After two days of confusion, the U.S. embassy in Vientiane said the announcement had been incorrect and made without instructions from Washington, D.C.

During his time as Vice Chief of Staff, in order to save money, Palmer issued an order ending the horse drawn caissons in Arlington National Cemetery. However, his order was countermanded. He retired from the army in 1962.

Palmer died on 10 November 1973, at Walter Reed Army Medical Center in Washington, D.C. He never married, and was buried in Arlington National Cemetery.

External audio
- You may listen to radio broadcasts of performances by Palmer's Seventh Army Symphony Orchestra from 1956–2006 here on 7aso.org

Military offices
Preceded by John E. Hull	Vice Chief of Staff of the United States Army; 1955–1957	Succeeded by Lyman Lemnitzer
