= William E. Birkhimer =

US Army general and Medal of Honor recipient

William Edward Birkhimer
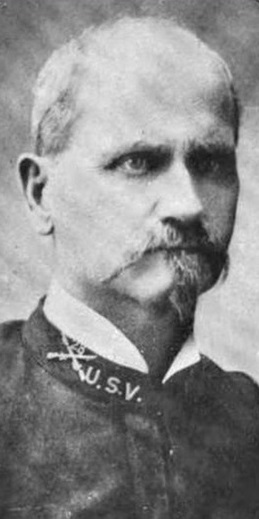
- William Edward Birkhimer, Medal of Honor recipient
- Born: March 1, 1848; Somerset, Ohio, U.S.
- Died: June 10, 1914 (aged 66); Washington, D.C., U.S.
- Burial place: Arlington National Cemetery
- Relatives: Williston B. Palmer, Charles D. Palmer (grandsons)
- Military career
- Allegiance: United States; Union
- Branch: United States Army; Union Army
- Service years: 1864–1906
- Rank: Brigadier general
- Unit: 3rd U.S. Artillery
- Conflicts: American Civil War; Philippine American War; Moro Rebellion
- Awards: Medal of Honor

William Edward Birkhimer (March 1, 1848 – June 10, 1914) was a United States Army brigadier general and lawyer received the Medal of Honor while a captain during the Philippine–American War. His career was long and varied, as he started as an Iowa private in the Union Army during the Civil War. He is buried at Arlington National Cemetery.

== Career dates ==
Birkhimer was inducted as a private in the 4th Iowa Cavalry on March 21, 1864, and Mustered out of service August 8, 1865. On September 1, 1866, he entered West Point as a cadet and on June 15, 1870, was Commissioned second lieutenant from United States Military Academy, 3rd Artillery Regiment. He was an Honor Graduate, Artillery School 1873.

From 1874 to 1876, he was an assistant professor of natural & experimental philosophy at West Point. On April 10, 1879, he promoted to first lieutenant. From 1886 through 1890 he was a Judge Advocate for Department of the Columbia. On February 10, 1898, he was promoted to captain. He received his LL.B. from University of Oregon in 1889.

He became an Associate Justice Supreme Court of the Philippines (audencial) Manila, Philippines in 1899. On July 5, 1899, he became a Colonel in the 28th United States Volunteer Infantry. On May 1, 1901, he mustered out of volunteers.

He was promoted to major, Artillery Corps August 1, 1901 and on May 20, 1905, was promoted to lieutenant colonel, Artillery Corps. He was promoted to brigadier general February 15, 1906 and on February 16, 1906 retired at his own request.

Birkhimer is the grandfather of Williston Birkhimer Palmer and Charles Day Palmer, brothers who became four-star generals.

== Awards ==
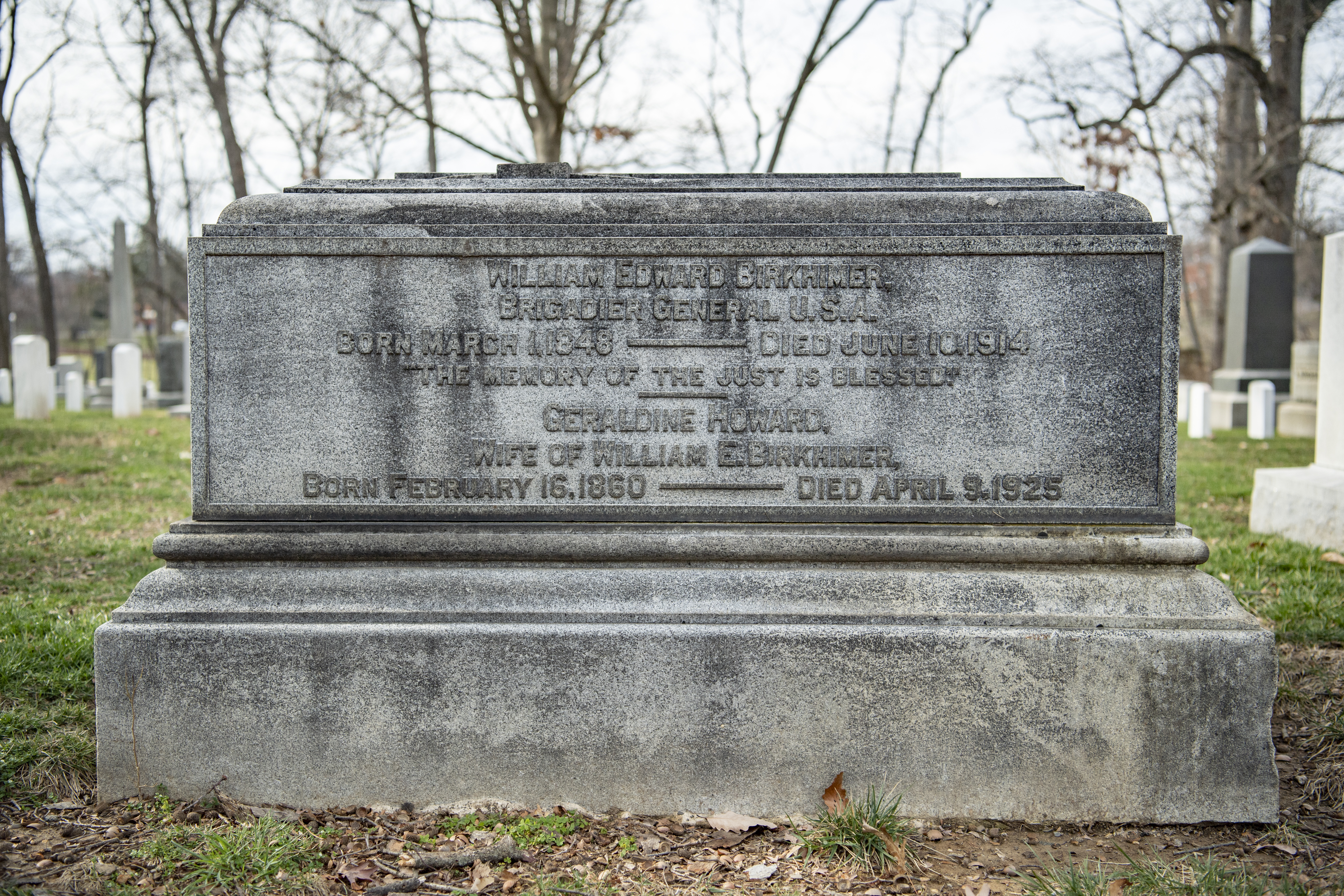
Grave at Arlington National Cemetery

- Medal of Honor
- Civil War Campaign Medal
- Indian Campaign Medal
- Spanish Campaign Medal
- Philippine Campaign Medal

=== Medal of Honor citation ===
Rank and Organization: Captain, 3d U.S. Artillery. Place and Date: At San Miguel de Mayumo, Luzon, Philippine Islands, May 13, 1899. Entered Service At: Iowa. Birth: Somerset, Ohio. Date of Issue: July 15, 1902.

Citation:

With 12 men charged and routed 300 of the enemy.

== Books ==
- Birkhimer, William E. (1914). Military Government and Martial Law (revised, 1914, third ed.). Kansas City, Missouri: Franklin Hudson Publishing Co.

== See also ==
- List of Medal of Honor recipients
- List of Philippine–American War Medal of Honor recipients
