= James Edward Moore =

United States Army general (1902–1986)

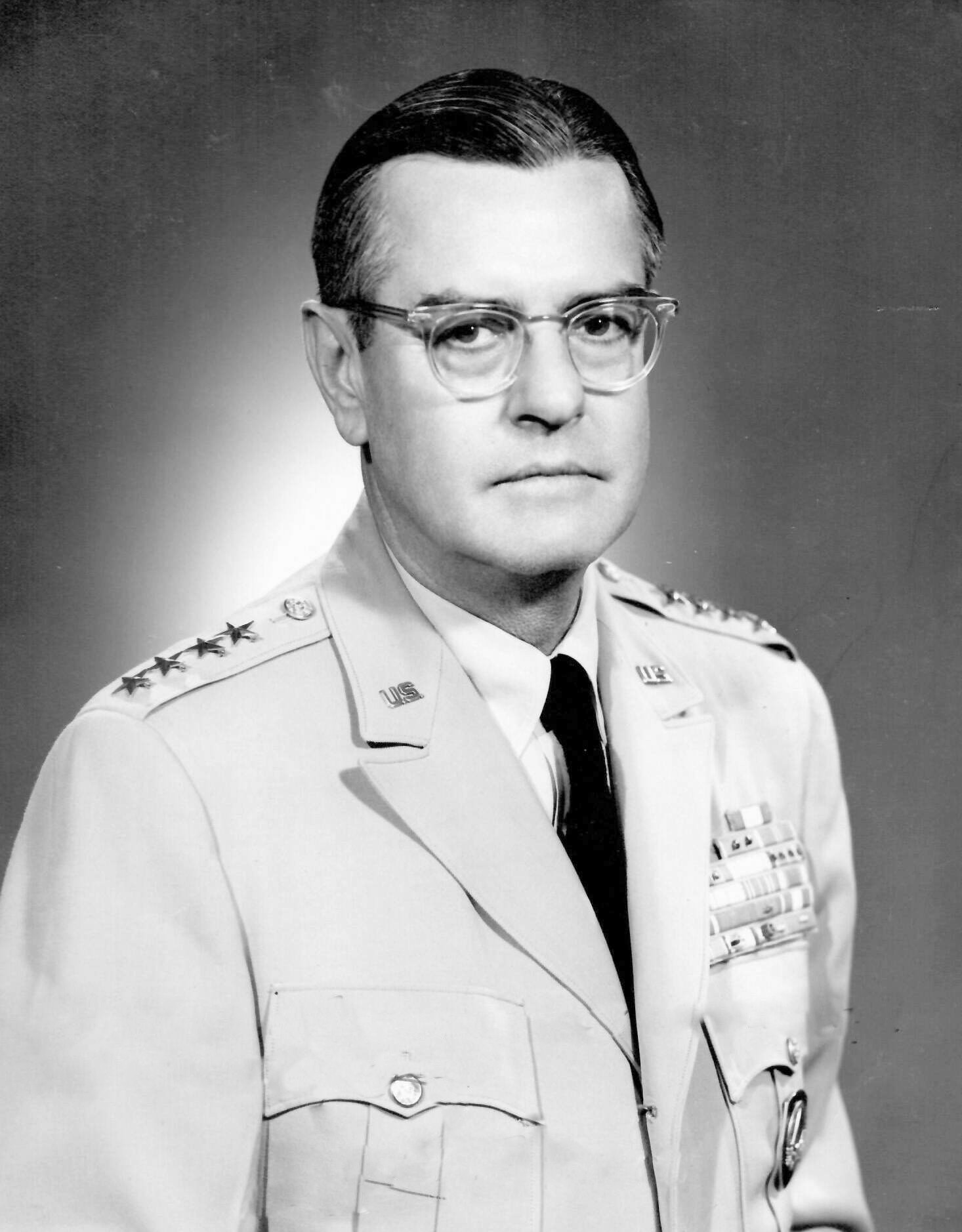
- Official portrait, 1960
- Born: 29 November 1902; New Bedford, Massachusetts, US
- Died: 28 January 1986 (aged 83); Washington, D.C., US
- Burial place: Arlington National Cemetery
- Relatives: James Edward Moore Jr. (son)
- Military career
- Allegiance: United States
- Branch: United States Army
- Service years: 1924–1963
- Rank: General
- Commands: United States Civil Administration of the Ryukyu Islands; IX Corps; United States Army War College; 10th Mountain Division
- Conflicts: World War II; Battle for Brest; Western Allied invasion of Germany
- Awards: Army Distinguished Service Medal (2); Legion of Merit (3); Bronze Star Medal; Order of the Crown (Belgium); Croix de Guerre (Belgium); Legion of Honor (France); Croix de Guerre 1939–1945 (France); Order of the Red Banner (Soviet Union); Grand Officer the Order of Orange-Nassau (Netherlands); Commander of Order of the British Empire (United Kingdom)

James Edward Moore (29 November 1902 – 28 January 1986) was a United States Army four-star general who served as the United States High Commissioner of the Ryukyus after World War II.

A graduate of the West Point class of 1924 and the Command and General Staff College at Fort Leavenworth, Kansas, Moore became the aide-de-camp to Brigadier General William H. Simpson in November 1940. He subsequently served as Simpson's chief of staff with the 35th and 30th Infantry Divisions, the XII Corps, and Fourth and the Ninth armies. He was chief of staff of the Ninth Army throughout its campaigns in the European Theater of Operations in 1944–1945.

After the war, he was the commanding general of the IX Corps from 1955 to 1958, Deputy Chief of Staff of the Army for Operations from 1958 to 1959, and the chief of staff at Supreme Headquarters Allied Powers in Europe until his retirement in June 1963.

== Early life and career ==
James Edward Moore was born in New Bedford, Massachusetts, on 29 November 1902, the oldest of five sons of James E. and Mary Daly Moore. His father died when he was sixteen years old. In high school, he organized and commanded the Reserve Officers' Training Corps (ROTC) unit, lettered in football, managed the basketball team, was on the debating team, and was president of his class for all four years.

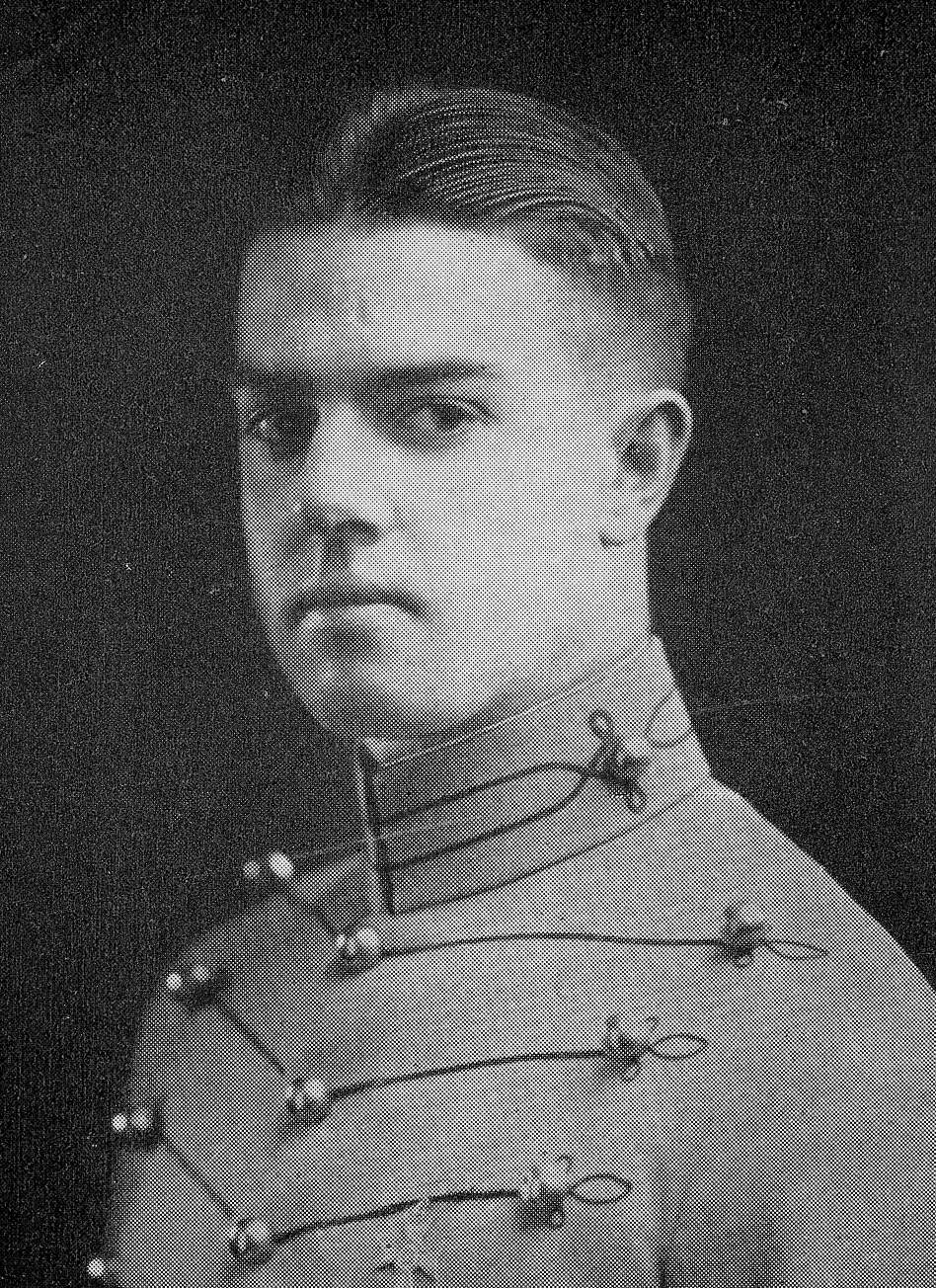
At West Point in 1924

Moore entered the United States Military Academy at West Point, New York, on 7 July 1920. As a Second Year cadet he started a cadet newspaper, and he wrote and directed the 100th Night Show, a traditional celebration held when the First Year cadets had 100 days to go before graduation. He graduated on 12 June 1924, ranked 155th in his class, and was commissioned as a second lieutenant in the infantry.

For his first assignment, Moore was posted to the 5th Infantry Regiment at Fort McKinley, Maine. In June, he returned home to marry Mildred Lindberg, his girlfriend from high school. They had three children: daughters Patricia and Mary, and a son, James Edward Moore Jr. In 1927, he was sent to the Philippines, where he served with the 31st Infantry Regiment at Fort Santiago. He was promoted to first lieutenant on 9 June 1929, and soon after returned to the United States, where he became a company commander in the 10th Infantry Regiment at Fort Thomas, Kentucky.

From September 1932 to May 1933, Moore attended the Infantry School at Fort Benning, Georgia. He was then sent to China, where he served with the 15th Infantry Regiment, which was based at Tianjin. He took the opportunity to visit Mongolia and Japan. He was promoted to captain on 1 August 1935. He returned to the United States in June 1937 and after a period of leave, joined the 2nd Brigade in September. He attended the Command and General Staff College at Fort Leavenworth, Kansas, from 12 August 1937 to 20 June 1938, and then became a company commander in the 29th Infantry Regiment and then the 38th Infantry Regiment at Fort Sill, Oklahoma, on 30 July 1938.

== World War II ==
=== Training in the United States ===
On 30 November 1940, Moore became the aide-de-camp to Brigadier General William H. Simpson, the assistant division commander of the 2nd Infantry Division, of which the 29th Infantry Regiment was a part. Simpson would be an officer with whom he would be associated over the next few years. Moore was promoted to major in the wartime Army of the United States on 31 January 1941. On 12 April he was transferred to the War Department General Staff in Washington, D.C., where he worked in the Budget and Legislative Planning Branch. His rank of major in the Infantry Branch became substantive on 12 June, and he was promoted to colonel on 6 January 1942.

In March 1942, with the United States now engaged in World War II, Moore became the chief of staff of the 35th Infantry Division at Camp San Luis Obispo, California. This reunited him with Simpson, who was the division commander. The position came with a promotion to colonel in the Army of the United States on 4 March, because the Chief of Staff of the United States Army, General George C. Marshall, had instituted a policy that regular officers taking on the position of chief of staff of an Army National Guard division would have that rank to ensure seniority over the National Guard officers on their staff.

Moore and Simpson were abruptly transferred to the 30th Infantry Division at Fort Jackson, South Carolina, on 22 May 1942. The division had performed poorly during the Carolina Maneuvers in 1941, and Lieutenant Generals Hugh Drum, Ben Lear and Lesley McNair had recommended the relief of the division commander, Major General Henry D. Russell. He was a relative of Senator Richard Russell Jr., so the relief was politically sensitive. The division was in poor shape, having just been reorganized, and a large number of transfers left its strength at less than 3,000 men. Simpson relieved all the regimental commanders. Moore was awarded the Legion of Merit for his work with the division staff. Simpson assumed command of the newly formed XII Corps in August 1942, but Moore remained with the 30th Infantry Division until 10 August 1943, when he rejoined Simpson as chief of staff of XII Corps.

=== Chief of Staff of Ninth Army ===
On 13 October 1943, Simpson assumed command of the Fourth United States Army, and Moore went with him as chief of staff. The Fourth Army headquarters was initially in San Jose, California, and it functioned as a training army. In search of more office space, the headquarters was moved to the Presidio of Monterey, California, on 1 November, and then to Fort Sam Houston, Texas, in January 1944, when it took over the training mission of the Third United States Army, which had moved overseas. More personnel arrived in early 1944, enabling the Fourth Army to be split into a training army (the Fourth) and a headquarters to be deployed overseas, the Eighth, which was activated on 5 May 1944. Simpson, Moore and most of the staff became part of the Eighth Army headquarters. Moore was part of the advance party of the headquarters that flew to the UK on 11 May, where Simpson met with the commander of the European Theater of Operations, United States Army, General Dwight D. Eisenhower. At Eisenhower's request, the Eighth Army was redesignated the Ninth United States Army to avoid confusion with the British Eighth Army. The main body of Ninth Army headquarters embarked for the UK on the ocean liner RMS Queen Elizabeth on 22 June.

The Ninth Army headquarters moved to France in August, and it became active as part of Lieutenant General Omar Bradley's 12th Army Group on 5 September when it took over command of the US forces in Brittany from Lieutenant General George S. Patton Jr.'s Third Army. Simpson's first task was the capture of Brest. There were sufficient artillery pieces in the area but not sufficient ammunition, especially for the heavier pieces. Over a two-week period, 40,000 long tons (41,000 t) of artillery ammunition was brought forward from dumps in Normandy and the UK. The battle commenced on 8 September and after much hard fighting the city was liberated on 20 September 1944.

Ninth Army headquarters moved to Arlon, where it opened on 2 October, and two days later the Ninth Army took over the center of the 12th Army Group's front in the Ardennes between the First and Third Armies. Moore considered moving the headquarters to Luxembourg City but was informed that the communications to the north were not safe. He was therefore surprised when the 12th Army Group headquarters moved there. On 10 October, Simpson received word that Ninth Army was to take over the northern sector of the 12th Army Group's front adjoining Field Marshal Bernard Montgomery's Anglo-Canadian 21st Army Group. Foreseeing that one of his armies would be assigned to the 21st Army Group at some point, Bradley preferred that it would be the Ninth rather than the more insular First Army. Bradley later wrote that: "Unlike the noisy and bumptious Third and the temperamental First, the Ninth remained uncommonly normal." Reflecting on the decision, Bradley opined that the Ninth Army staff collaborated with the 21st Army Group better than the First Army staff would have.

During the Battle of the Bulge, both the First and Ninth Armies were transferred to the 21st Army Group after the 12th Army Group's communications with the north were cut. When Montgomery visited Ninth Army headquarters, his reception was genial and professional. Moore established good relationships with the staffs of both Lieutenant General Courtney Hodges's First Army and Lieutenant General Sir Miles Dempsey's British Second Army, but he was not gullible: when six of the Ninth Army's twenty-six truck companies were sent to support the First Army, Moore assigned a staff officer to ensure that they were returned. He was promoted to major general on 12 April 1945.

For his service as chief of staff of the Ninth Army, Moore received the Army Distinguished Service Medal, two oak leaf clusters to his Legion of Merit, and the Bronze Star Medal. He also received foreign orders and decorations, including the Order of the Crown with palm and Croix de Guerre from Belgium, the Legion of Honor and Croix de Guerre 1939–1945 from France and the Order of the Red Banner from the Soviet Union. He was made a Grand Officer in the military Order of Orange-Nassau by the Netherlands and an Honorary Commander of the Order of the British Empire by the United Kingdom.

== Post-war ==
After the war in Europe ended, Moore returned to the United States, where he became the chief of staff of the Second United States Army, based in Memphis, Tennessee, on 1 October 1945; it moved to Baltimore, Maryland, on 5 June 1946. He was awarded two Commendation Ribbons for this service. His rank of major general in the Army of the United States was terminated on 30 June 1946, and he reverted to his substantive rank of major. He then became the deputy chief of staff of the Second Army.

Moore served at headquarters of the United States Army Pacific at Fort Shafter, Hawaii, from 1 January to 28 February 1947, when he became the Commanding General of the South Sector there. He was promoted to lieutenant colonel again on 12 June 1947. From 12 May 1948 to 30 June 1950 he served on the Army General staff in Washington, DC. He commanded the 10th Mountain Division at Fort Riley, Kansas, until May 1951, when he was struck down with a severe case of tuberculosis, and spent the next two years at Fitzsimons Army Hospital.

In April 1953 Moore was appointed commandant of the United States Army War College, and he became a major general again. He was the United States High Commissioner to the Ryukyu Islands from 1953 to 1955, and the commanding general of the IX Corps from 1955 to 1958. General Maxwell D. Taylor chose him as the Deputy Chief of Staff of the Army for Operations in June 1958. In November 1959, he was assigned to Supreme Headquarters Allied Powers in Europe (SHAPE) near Paris as chief of staff to the supreme commander, General Lauris Norstad. Moore was promoted to general in April 1960. This was his last assignment before his retirement in June 1963.

== Later life ==
Moore was a member of the research council of the Research Analysis Corp from 1963 to 1969. His wife Mildred died on 25 September 1976, and he remarried in April 1982 to Anne Ramsey Farrell, the widow of Lieutenant General Francis William Farrell.

Moore died from respiratory arrest on 28 January 1986 at Walter Reed Army Medical Center, and was buried in Arlington National Cemetery with his first wife Mildred.

== Dates of rank ==
| Insignia | Rank | Component | Date | Reference |
|---|---|---|---|---|
| No insignia at the time | Second Lieutenant | Infantry | 12 June 1924 | |
| | First Lieutenant | Infantry | 9 June 1929 | |
| | Captain | Infantry | 1 August 1935 | |
| | Major | Army of the United States | 31 January 1941 | |
| | Major | Infantry | 12 June 1941 | |
| | Lieutenant Colonel | Army of the United States | 6 January 1942 | |
| | Colonel | Army of the United States | 4 March 1942 | |
| | Brigadier General | Army of the United States | 27 January 1944 | |
| | Major General | Army of the United States | 12 April 1945 | |
| | Major (reverted) | Infantry | 30 June 1946 | |
| | Lieutenant Colonel | Infantry | 12 June 1947 | |
| | Colonel | Infantry | 10 June 1948 | |
| | Brigadier General | Regular Army | 1948 | |
| | Major General | Regular Army | 1949 | |
| | Lieutenant General | Regular Army | 1956 | |
| | General | Regular Army | 1960 | |

== Notes ==
Military offices
| Preceded by Edward Almond | Commandant of the United States Army War College; 1953–1955 | Succeeded by Clyde D. Eddleman |
