= William Hardin Harrison =

United States Army general (1933–2024)

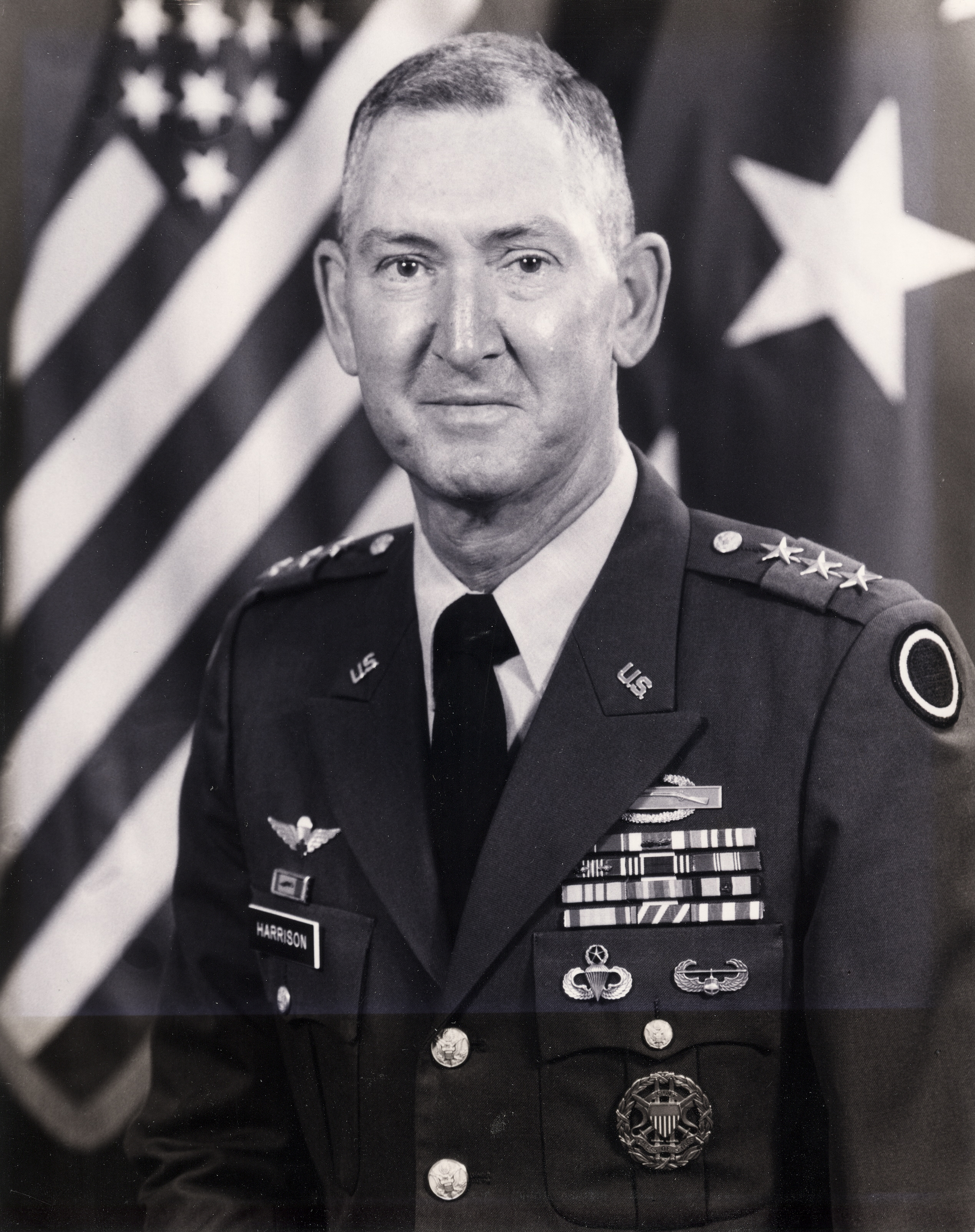
- Lieutenant General Harrison as I Corps commander
- Born: July 2, 1933; Pembroke, Kentucky, U.S.
- Died: February 18, 2024 (aged 90); University Place, Washington, U.S.
- Military career
- Allegiance: United States
- Branch: United States Army
- Service years: 1954–1957; 1959–1991
- Rank: Lieutenant General
- Nickname: Bill
- Commands: Sixth United States Army; I Corps; 7th Infantry Division
- Conflicts: Vietnam War
- Awards: Army Distinguished Service Medal; Bronze Star Medal

William Hardin Harrison (July 2, 1933 – February 18, 2024) was a lieutenant general in the United States Army. He was a former commander of the I Corps at Fort Lewis, a post which he served from 1987 to 1989. He was also a former commander of the Sixth United States Army at the Presidio of San Francisco, and 7th Infantry Division and Fort Ord. After his retirement from the Army, he became the first mayor of Lakewood, Washington. Harrison died in his home in University Place, Washington on February 18, 2024.

== Personal life ==
Harrison was born on July 2, 1933, in Pembroke, Kentucky. He attained a Bachelor of Arts degree in history from William Jewell College and a Master of Science degree in public administration from Shippensburg State College.

== Military career ==
Harrison entered the United States Army in 1954 as an infantryman. He attended basic training at Fort Knox, Kentucky. After completing Officer Candidate School, he was commissioned as a second lieutenant in 1955. Harrison left the army in 1957 and returned in 1959. During his 37-year career, Harrison commanded companies in the 101st Airborne Division and the 7th Infantry Division, a battalion in 3rd Armored Division and a brigade in the 2nd Armored Division.

During the Vietnam War, Harrison served as Sector and Regimental Advisor in the II Corps. He was commanding general of the 7th Infantry Division from 1985 to 1987. Harrison was promoted to lieutenant general and became the commander of I Corps and Fort Lewis until 1989. In 1989, he became the commanding general of the Sixth United States Army and Presidio of San Francisco. Harrison retired in 1991.

Harrison was a graduate of the Command and General Staff College and the United States Army War College.

== Awards and decorations ==
Among his military decorations, Harrison was awarded the Army Distinguished Service Medal, Bronze Star Medal, the Meritorious Service Medal, Joint Service Commendation Medal, and the Army Commendation Medal. He was awarded Order of National Security Merit Cheonsu Medal by the Republic of South Korea. Harrison earned the Combat Infantryman Badge, Master Parachutist Badge, and the Air Assault Badge. He also received Korean and Canadian parachutist badges.

In 1977, Harrison was inducted into the Officer Candidate School Hall of Honor at the National Infantry Museum.

== Post-military life ==
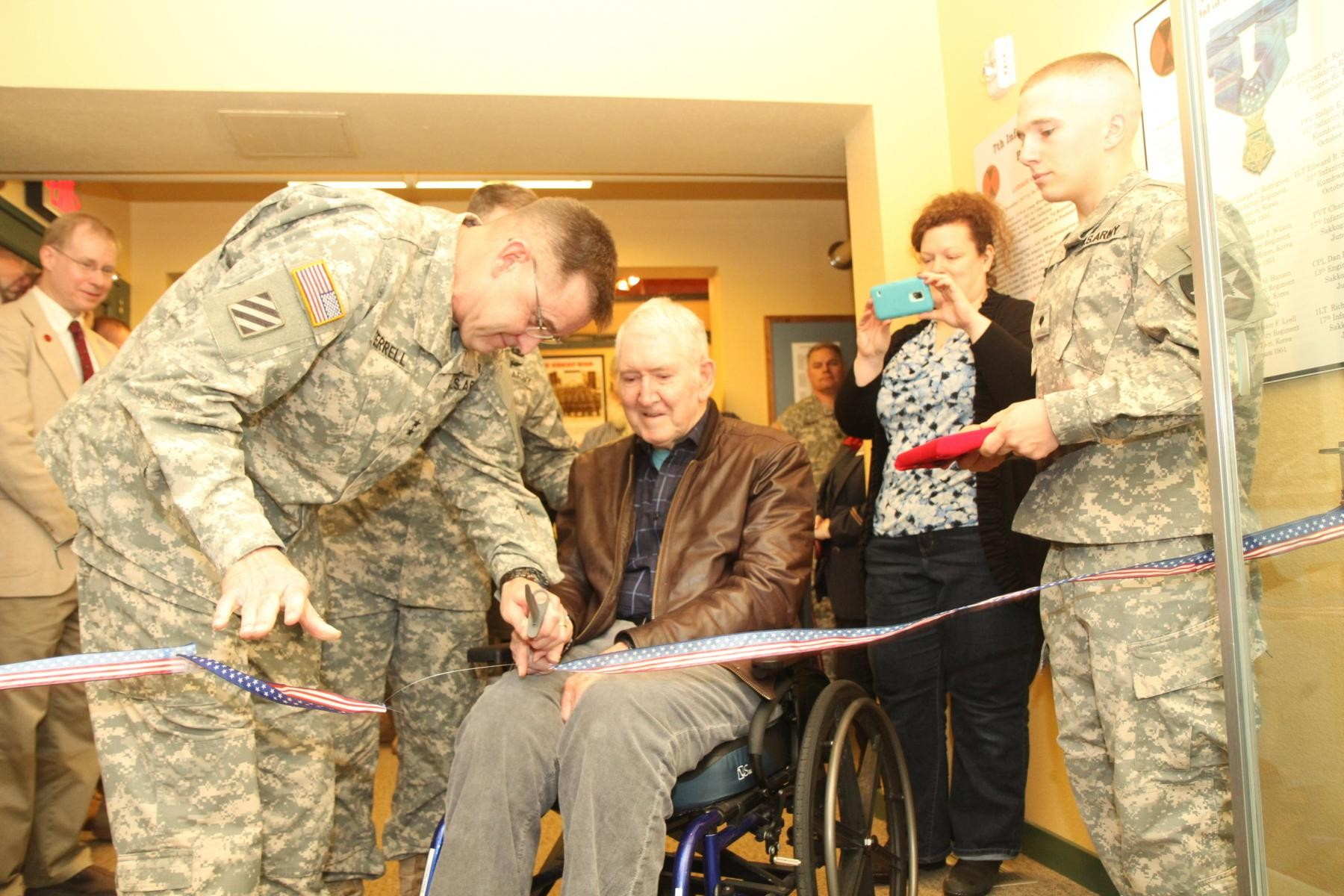
Harrison at the ribbon cutting for an exhibit at the Fort Lewis Museum

Harrison turned to civic service after his retirement. He was a key figure in the incorporation of Lakewood, Washington, and served as the new city's first mayor. He served as Mayor of Lakewood from 1995 through 2003, and finished serving the City Council in 2005.

In 2015, the new headquarters of the 7th Infantry Division, Harrison Hall, was named for Harrison. Also in 2015, the Clover Park School District named the Lt. General William H. Harrison Preparatory School after Harrison.
