= Lemuel Mathewson =

United States Army lieutenant general

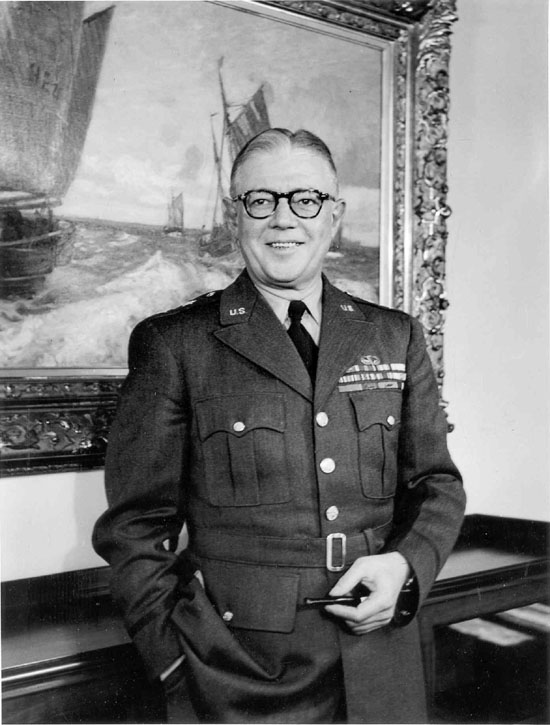
- General Mathewson in Berlin c. 1951
- Born: March 29, 1899; Bath, New York, U.S.
- Died: February 26, 1970 (aged 70); Walter Reed Army Hospital, Washington, D.C., U.S.
- Burial place: West Point Cemetery
- Military career
- Allegiance: United States
- Branch: United States Army
- Service years: 1918–1958
- Rank: Lieutenant General
- Commands: Sixth United States Army; V Corps; United States Communications Zone, Orléans, France; United States Berlin Command; 11th Airborne Division Artillery; XVIII Airborne Corps Artillery
- Conflicts: World War II
- Awards: Army Distinguished Service Medal; Legion of Merit (3); Bronze Star Medal; Order of Alexander Nevsky (USSR)
- Other work: Chairman, Inter-American Defense Board

Lemuel Mathewson (March 29, 1899 – February 26, 1970) was a United States Army lieutenant general.

== Early career ==
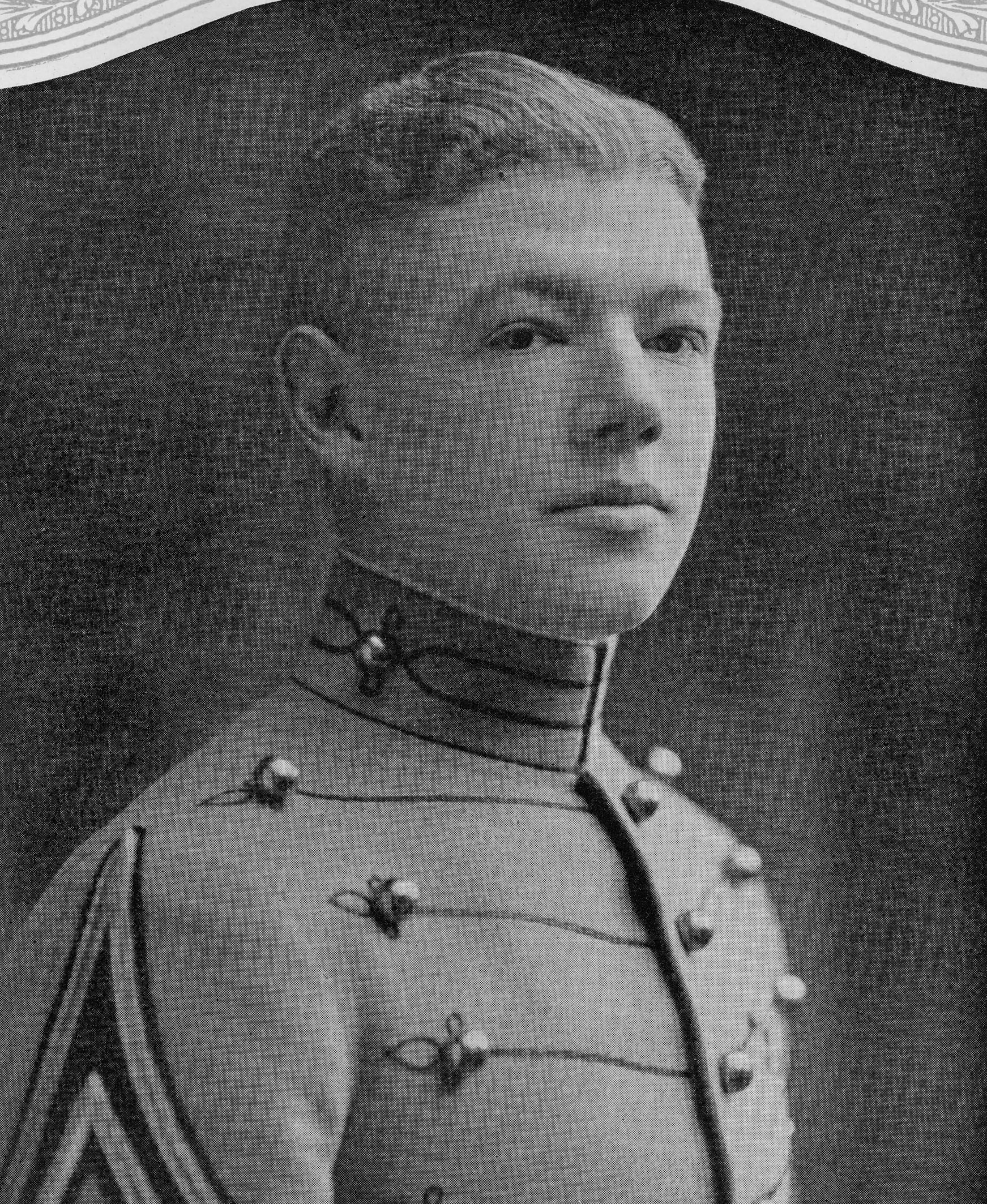
At West Point in 1922

Mathewson was born in Bath, New York on March 29, 1899. A 1917 graduate of Bath's Haverling High School, he graduated from the United States Military Academy in 1922 and was commissioned as an artillery officer.

In the 1920s and 1930s, Mathewson served in a variety of assignments in the United States and overseas, including graduate student in Madrid, Spain, professor of Spanish at the United States Military Academy, instructor at the Fort Sill, Oklahoma Field Artillery School, and special projects officer in Latin America.

From 1938 to 1939, Mathewson attended the Command and General Staff College.

== World War II ==
- 1943 to 1944 – Mathewson served as Aide to President Franklin D. Roosevelt, and was with him during conferences in Cairo and Tehran.
- 1944 – Mathewson was appointed assistant commander of VII Corps Artillery.
- 1944 to 1945 – Mathewson was then assigned to command XVIII Airborne Corps Artillery.

== Post World War II ==
- 1945 to 1948 – Mathewson was Chief of Staff for the Caribbean Defense Command.
- 1948 to 1949 – Mathewson was coordinator for the Inter-American Defense Board.
- 1949 to 1951 – He became commander of the 11th Airborne Division Artillery.
- 1951 to 1953 – Mathewson served as commander of the U.S. Berlin Command.
- 1953 to 1954 – Mathewson commanded the U.S. Communications Zone in Orléans, France.

== Later career ==
- 1954 to 1955 – Mathewson served as Director of the Joint Staff for the Joint Chiefs of Staff.
- 1956 to 1957 – Mathewson was commander of the U.S. V Corps.
- 1957 to 1958 – Mathewson served as commander of the U.S. Sixth Army and went into retirement. In 1957 he was assigned as military aide to Queen Elizabeth II during her tour of the United States.

== Awards and decorations ==
Mathewson's awards included the Army Distinguished Service Medal, Legion of Merit with two oak leaf clusters, the Bronze Star Medal and the Order of Alexander Nevsky from the Soviet Union.

== Later work ==
Mathewson served as Chairman of the Inter-American Defense Board from 1958 to 1961.

== Retirement and death ==
After retiring from the IADB Mathewson resided in McLean, Virginia. He died at Walter Reed Army Hospital on February 26, 1970. General Mathewson was buried in Section III Site A-24 of the West Point Cemetery.

Military offices
Preceded by Robert N. Young	Commanding General of the Sixth United States Army; 1957–1958	Succeeded by Charles D. Palmer
