= James Edward Moore Jr. =

United States Army general (1931–1999)

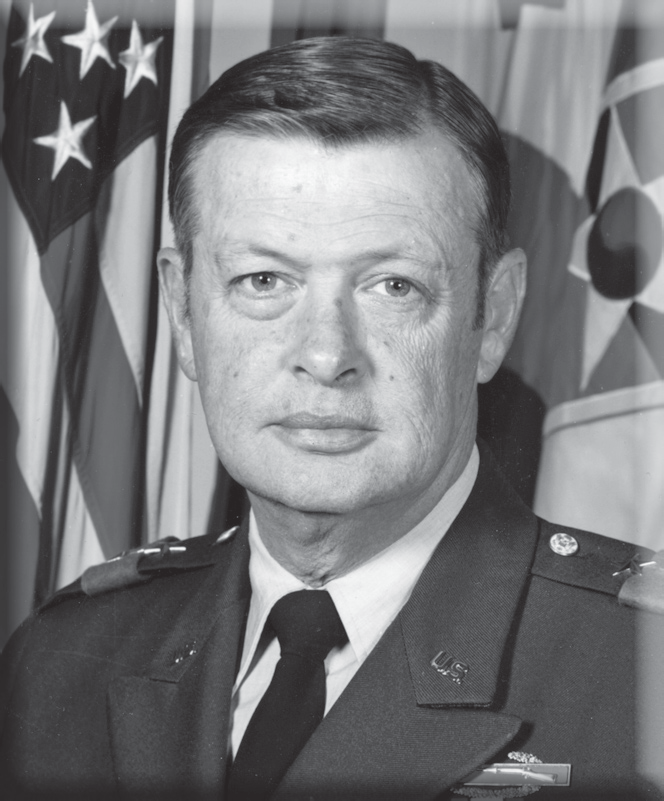
- Born: 28 June 1931; Fort Thomas, Kentucky, US
- Died: 30 January 1999 (aged 67); Washington, D.C., US
- Burial place: Arlington National Cemetery
- Relatives: James Edward Moore (father)
- Military career
- Allegiance: United States
- Branch: Infantry
- Service years: 1954–1989
- Rank: Lieutenant General
- Commands: Sixth Army; Combined Field Army, Korea; 7th Infantry Division
- Conflicts: Vietnam War
- Awards: Silver Star; Legion of Merit (3); Army Distinguished Service Medal (3); Meritorious Service Medal; Army Commendation Medal (2); Air Medal (5)

James Edward Moore Jr. (28 June 1931 – 30 January 1999) was a United States Army three-star general who served in the Vietnam War. A 1954 graduate of the United States Military Academy at West Point, New York, Moore served in Vietnam as the S-3 (operations officer) of the 3rd Brigade, 25th Infantry Division and the commander of the 1st Battalion, 35th Infantry. After the war he commanded the 7th Infantry Division, Combined Field Army, Korea, and the Sixth Army.

== Early life ==
James Moore Jr. was born in Fort Thomas, Kentucky on 28 June 1931, the second child and only son of James Edward Moore, an Army officer, and his wife Mildred May née Lindberg. As a military brat, he moved about frequently, including Tientsin, China, where his father was stationed from 1932 to 1935, and he learned to speak Mandarin Chinese.

Moore graduated from Woodrow Wilson High School in Washington, D.C., in 1949. While he was there, he dated a neighbor, Joan Marie Phillips. He then attended Sullivan's Prep School in Washington, DC. He entered the United States Military Academy at West Point, New York, from which he graduated with a Bachelor of Science degree in engineering on 8 June 1954 and was commissioned as a second lieutenant in the Infantry Branch. West Point cadets are not allowed to marry, but on 19 June 1954, shortly after graduation, he married Joan Phillips at Carlisle Barracks in Pennsylvania. They had seven children; three daughters: Elizabeth, Susan and Mary; and four sons: James, Robert, Michael, and Matthew.

== Military career ==
=== Junior officer ===
After graduation leave, Moore went to the Infantry School at Fort Benning, Georgia, for the Basic Course and Airborne and Ranger training. On completion in 1955, he was assigned to the 60th Infantry. The following year he was deployed to Heilbronn, Germany, where he served as a platoon and company commander in the 28th Infantry. He was awarded the Army Commendation Medal. In 1957 he was posted to the 325th Infantry at Fort Bragg, North Carolina, where he earned a second Army Commendation Medal. He was promoted to first lieutenant the following year.

Moore returned to the Infantry School in 1961 for the Advanced Course. He then went to Paris to perfect his French with Alliance française before joining the staff of West Point as a French language teacher. He earned a Master of Arts degree from Columbia University in 1965, and attended the Air Command and Staff College at Maxwell Air Force Base in Montgomery, Alabama, in 1966.

=== Vietnam War ===
That year, Moore volunteered for service in Vietnam, initially serving with the 1st Cavalry Division as a liaison officer to French plantation owners. He then became the S-3 (operations officer) of the 3rd Brigade, 25th Infantry Division. He became one of the first members of his class to command a battalion when he assumed command of the 1st Battalion, 35th Infantry while still a major. He distinguished himself in battle on 7 March 1967, and was awarded the Silver Star and the Vietnamese Cross of Gallantry. His Silver Star citation read:

The President of the United States of America, authorized by Act of Congress July 9, 1918 (amended by an act of July 25, 1963), takes pleasure in presenting the Silver Star to Major (Infantry) James Edward Moore, Jr., United States Army, for gallantry in action while engaged in military operations involving conflict with an armed hostile force in the Republic of Vietnam. Major Moore distinguished himself by exceptionally valorous actions while serving as Commanding Officer of the 1st Battalion, 35th Infantry Regiment, 25th Infantry Division, in action against the enemy on 7 March 1967. Major Moore demonstrated great personal bravery in a battle in which his troops overran a North Vietnamese Battalion near Hoa Tan in northern Binh Din Province, Vietnam. Major Moore was wounded during the action during which he ordered his command helicopter to land so he could direct the evacuation of wounded soldiers. The gallant actions and dedicated devotion to duty demonstrated by Major Moore, without regard for his own life, were in keeping with the highest traditions of military service and reflect great credit upon himself and the United States Army.

For his service in Vietnam, he was also awarded the Legion of Merit and five Air Medals. On completion of his tour of duty, Moore went to the Pentagon in Washington, D.C., where he served in the office of the Deputy Chief of Staff for Personnel, for which he was awarded the Meritorious Service Medal. He attended the Army War College at Carlisle Barracks in 1969. The following year, he went back to Europe as the J-3 (operations officer) at Headquarters, U.S. European Command at Patch Barracks in Stuttgart, Germany. He was awarded a bronze Oak Leaf Cluster to his Legion of Merit. Promoted to colonel, he commanded the 3rd Brigade, 7th Infantry Division at Fort Ord, California, in 1973, and then the 3rd Brigade from 1974 to 1976.

=== General officer ===
Moore returned to the Pentagon, where he was a deputy to the Director of the Army Staff (Staff Action Control) in the office of the Chief of Staff of the Army from 1976 to 1979, for which he was awarded a second bronze oak leaf cluster to his Legion of Merit. He was promoted to brigadier general in early 1979 and became the assistant division commander of the 2nd Infantry Division in Korea in July. Another tour of duty at the Pentagon followed, this time as deputy director, and then Director, of Operations, Readiness and Mobilization in the Office of the Deputy Chief of Staff for Operations and Plans. He was promoted to brigadier general and in July 1982, he returned to Fort Ord as commander of the 7th Infantry Division. He was awarded the Army Distinguished Service Medal.

Promoted to lieutenant general in 1985, Moore became commander of the Combined Field Army, Korea, a three-star command consisting of two Republic of Korea Army corps, with a combined American and Korean staff. He was awarded a bronze oak leaf cluster to his Army Distinguished Service Medal for this service. His final assignment, from 1987 until his retirement on 30 June 1989, was as commanding general of the Sixth United States Army, for which he was awarded a second bronze oak leaf cluster to his Army Distinguished Service Medal for this service.

== Death and legacy ==
In retirement, Moore moved to Salinas, California, where he was involved as a civilian in developing plans for the redevelopment of Fort Ord. In March 1998, he was diagnosed with cancer, from which he died in Salinas on 30 January 1999. He was buried in the Arlington National Cemetery. A road in Fort Ord was named "General Jim Moore Boulevard" in his honor. After Joan died in 2002, a scholarship was established in their names for students at California State University, Monterey Bay, which is located on site of the former Fort Ord.
