= Sixth Army (United States) =

Theater Army of the U.S. Army

- Active: 15 October 1921–1 October 1933; 22 January 1943–26 January 1946; 1 March 1946–23 June 1995; 31 July 2008–present
- Country: United States of America
- Branch: United States Army
- Type: Theater Army
- Role: Component command
- Garrison/HQ: Fort Sam Houston, Texas
- Nickname: "Alamo Force"
- Motto: Born of War
- Engagements: World War II; New Guinea; Leyte; Luzon; Manila; Wawa Dam; Southern Philippines
- Decorations: Meritorious Unit Commendation; Superior Unit Award; Philippine Republic Presidential Unit Citation
- Website: arsouth.army.mil

Commanders
- Commanding General: MG Philip J. Ryan
- Deputy Commanding General: BG Michael J. Eastridge
- Command Sergeant Major: CSM Eric B. Olsen
- Notable commanders: Walter Krueger; Joseph Stilwell; Albert C. Wedemeyer; Robert M. Cannon; David E. Grange Jr. William Hardin Harrison

Insignia
- Flag

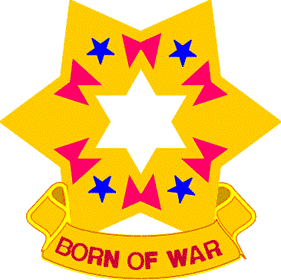
- Distinctive unit insignia

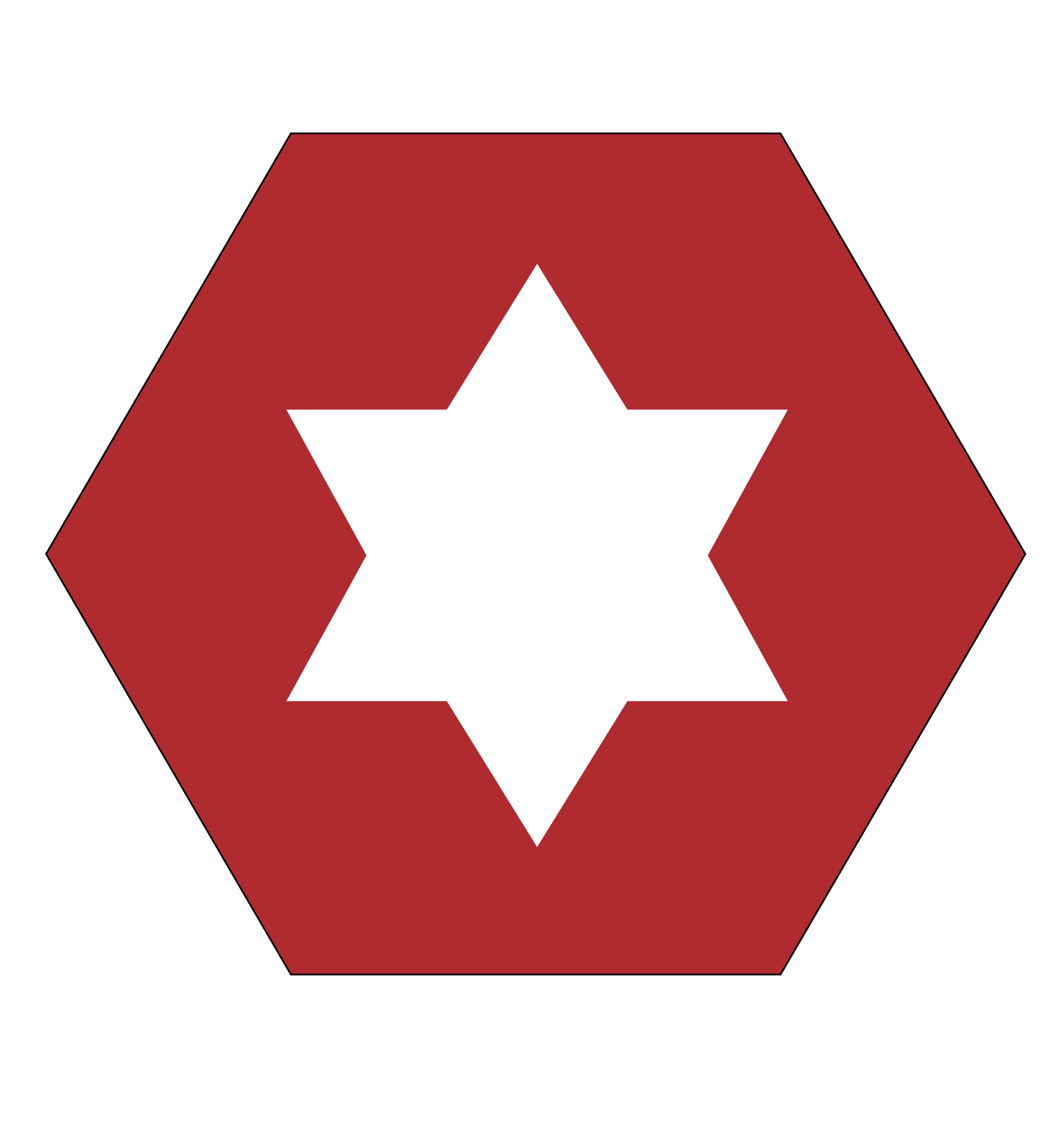
- Sixth Army's Shoulder Sleeve Insignia 1927-1945 Saw limited use in WW2

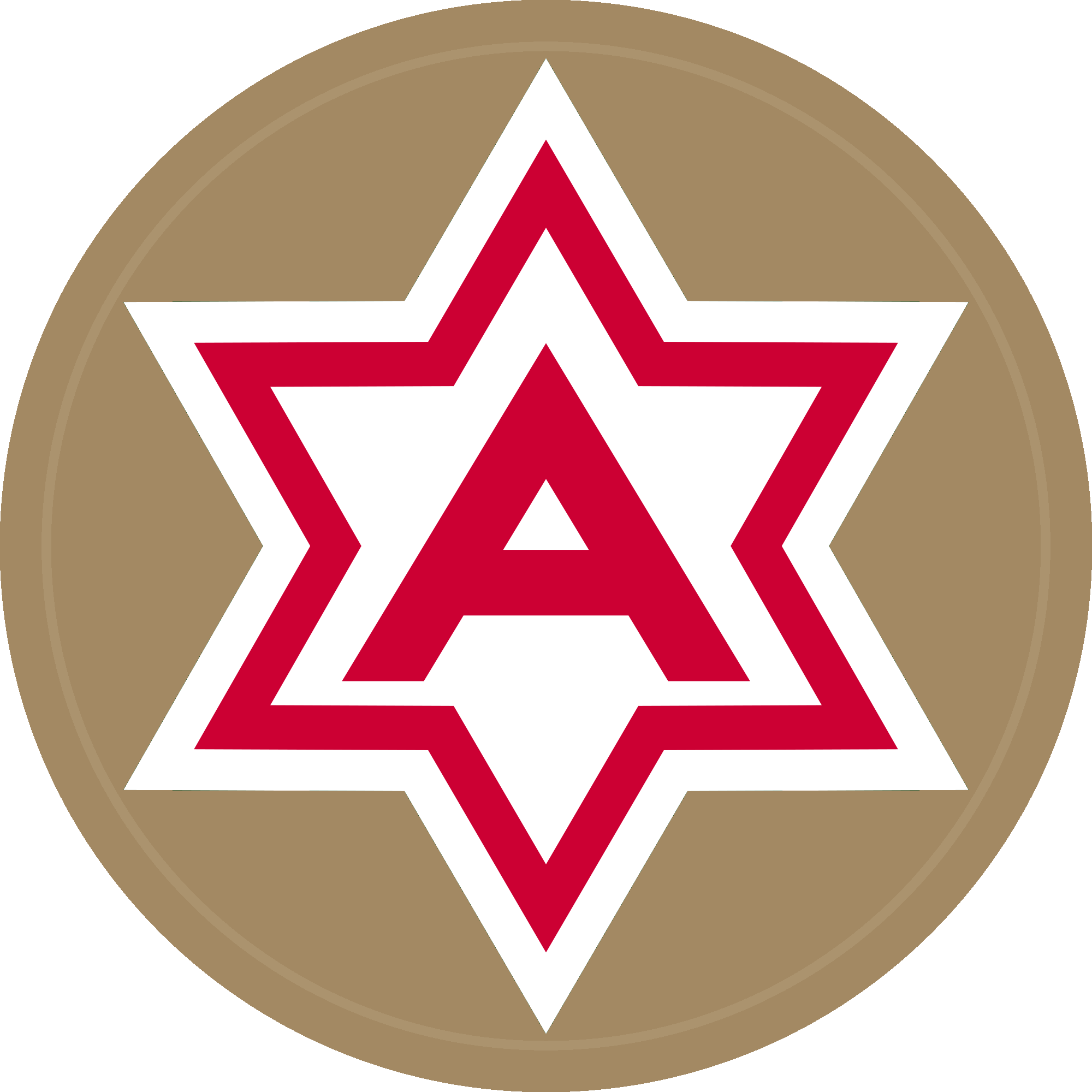
- Sixth Army's Shoulder Sleeve Insignia during WW2 until the 1950s

- NATO Map Symbol

Sixth Army is a theater army of the United States Army. The Army service component command of United States Southern Command, its area of responsibility includes 31 countries and 15 areas of special sovereignty in Central and South America and the Caribbean. It is headquartered at Fort Sam Houston.

The Sixth Army saw extensive service in the South Pacific during World War II, including in New Britain, New Guinea, and the Philippines. Postwar it served stateside training army forces until its inactivation during force reduction in 1995. The army was reactivated in 2007.

== History ==
=== Interwar period ===
==== Sixth Army (I) ====
The first iteration of the Sixth Army was authorized by the National Defense Act of 1920 and was originally to be composed of Organized Reserve units primarily from the Seventh, Eighth, and Ninth Corps Areas. The Sixth Army Headquarters and Headquarters Company were constituted in the Organized Reserve on 15 October 1921 and allotted to the Seventh Corps Area. Little Rock, Arkansas, was designated as the army headquarters upon organization, but the unit was never organized at that location. The Headquarters Company was initiated 13 October 1922 at Little Rock. Little Rock remained the Sixth Army’s headquarters location upon the event of its activation until 25 February 1924, when St. Louis, Missouri, was designated as the army’s new headquarters location. The headquarters was initiated in August 1924 at St. Louis. The Headquarters Company was inactivated at Little Rock on 1 October 1924 and relocated to St. Louis. Due to the abandonment of the “Six Army” plan in favor of the “Four Army” plan, the Sixth Army was deleted from the mobilization plans on 1 October 1933 and demobilized (disbanded). Its subordinate units were reassigned to the Fourth Army, the General Headquarters Reserve, or demobilized.

=== World War II ===
==== Sixth Army (II) ====
The Sixth United States Army was activated in January 1943, commanded by Lieutenant General Walter Krueger. Under the code name Alamo Force, it assumed control of the majority of US Army units involved in Operation Cartwheel, the campaign to isolate and neutralize the Japanese base at Rabaul in New Britain. Following the completion of Cartwheel, Sixth Army joined the Australian Army and other US forces on the north coast of New Guinea. Similar in conception to the island hopping operations of the central Pacific, the object of the attacks was to land, establish a garrison and airfield which could support the next strike, and then move on.

In September 1944, Sixth Army was relieved from operations in New Guinea by the Eighth Army. On 20 October 1944, X Corps and XXIV Corps, under Sixth Army, invaded Leyte in the Philippines. By December, Leyte was secured, and the Sixth Army was relieved again by Eighth Army to prepare for the invasion of Luzon. As a prelude to that invasion, the island of Mindoro was invaded by the Western Visayan Task Force comprising the 19th and 503rd Regimental Combat Teams. Sixth Army took part in the Invasion of Lingayen Gulf on 9 January 1945 with the subordinate units of I and XIV Corps. Sixth Army units fought south until they met up those of Eighth Army advancing from around Manila. Sixth Army then continued to clear the north of Luzon and confronted the Shimbu Group in the Sierra Madres until the end of the war. Sixth Army was to have provided the ground forces for the first phase of the invasion of Japan, though after Japan's early surrender Sixth Army was reassigned to occupation duty in Japan. Sixth Army returned to the United States in 1946, and was headquartered at the Presidio of San Francisco.

After the war, Sixth Army took responsibility for training of Army forces from part of the continental United States. It was eventually inactivated in June 1995 due to force reductions.

== Reactivation ==
In 2007 it was decided that US Army South would be redesignated as US Army South (Sixth Army) under the Army modularization program. It is garrisoned at the Old Brooke Army Medical Center building at Fort Sam Houston.

Organization of the army after reformation is as follows:

- United States Army South Headquarters and Headquarters Battalion, Fort Sam Houston, Texas
- 470th Military Intelligence Brigade, Fort Sam Houston, Texas
- 56th Signal Battalion, Fort Sam Houston, Texas
- Army Forces, Honduras (Joint Task Force Bravo), Soto Cano Air Base, Honduras
- Geospatial Planning Cell, 512th Engineer Detachment, Fort Sam Houston, Texas
- 377th Theater Sustainment Command, New Orleans, Louisiana
- 807th Deployment Support Medical Command, Fort Douglas, Utah
- 525th Military Police Battalion, Guantanamo Bay, Cuba
- 1st Battalion, 228th Aviation Regiment, Soto Cano Air Base, Honduras

== Decorations ==
- Meritorious Unit Commendation (Army) Streamer embroidered PACIFIC THEATER
- Superior Unit Award Streamer embroidered 1994
- Philippine Republic Presidential Unit Citation Streamer embroidered 17 OCTOBER 1944 TO 4 JULY 1945

== Commanding officers ==
- GEN Walter Krueger (16 February 1943 – 28 January 1946)
- Inactive (29 January 1946 – 28 February 1946)
- GEN Joseph W. Stilwell (1 March 1946 – 12 October 1946)
- MG George Price Hays (13 October 1946 - June 1947)
- GEN Mark W. Clark (June 1947 – 30 September 1949)
- LTG Albert C. Wedemeyer (1 October 1949 – 23 June 1951)
- MG Milton B. Halsey (acting) (23 June 1951 – 31 August 1951)
- LTG Joseph M. Swing (1 August 1951–1954)
- LTG Willard G. Wyman (1954–1955)
- LTG Robert N. Young (1955–1957)
- LTG Lemuel Mathewson (1957–1958)
- LTG Charles D. Palmer (1958 – 31 August 1959)
- LTG Robert M. Cannon (1 September 1959 – 31 August 1961)
- LTG John L. Ryan Jr. (1 September 1961 – 31 July 1963)
- LTG Frederic J. Brown II (1 August 1963 – 31 July 1965)
- LTG James L. Richardson (1 August 1965 – 1967)
- LTG Ben Harrell (1967–1968)
- LTG Stanley R. Larsen (1968–1971)
- LTG Alexander D. Surles Jr. (1971–1972)
- LTG Richard G. Stilwell (1972–1973)
- LTG Elvy B. Roberts (1973–1975)
- LTG Edward M. Flanagan Jr. (1975–1978)
- LTG Eugene Forrester (1978–1980)
- LTG Charles M. Hall (1980–1981)
- LTG David E. Grange Jr. (1981–1984)
- LTG Robert Arter (1984–1986)
- LTG Frederick F. Woerner Jr. (1986–1987)
- LTG James E. Moore Jr. (1987–1989)
- LTG William H. Harrison (1989–1991)
- LTG Glynn C. Mallory Jr. (1991–1995)
