= Robert Milchrist Cannon =

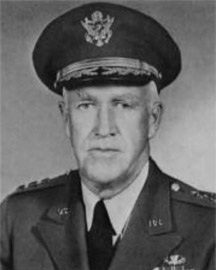
- General Cannon as deputy commander of United States Army Pacific, 1957
- Born: 16 August 1901; Salt Lake City, Utah, US
- Died: 3 September 1976 (aged 75); Norwalk, Connecticut, US
- Burial place: San Francisco National Cemetery
- Military career
- Allegiance: United States
- Branch: United States Army
- Service years: 1925–1961
- Rank: Lieutenant General
- Service number: 0-16163
- Unit: Field Artillery Branch
- Commands: Sixth United States Army; Joint United States Military Advisory Group, Philippines; Army Audit Agency; United States Army Advisory Group, Turkey; 82nd Airborne Division Artillery
- Conflicts: World War II
- Awards: Army Distinguished Service Medal (2); Legion of Merit; Bronze Star

Robert Milchrist Cannon (16 August 1901 – 3 September 1976) was a United States Army lieutenant general. He was notable for his World War II service in the China Burma India Theater and his command of the Sixth United States Army.

== Early life ==
A member of Utah's prominent Cannon family, Robert Milchrist Cannon was born on 16 August 1901, in Salt Lake City, Utah.

== Early military career ==
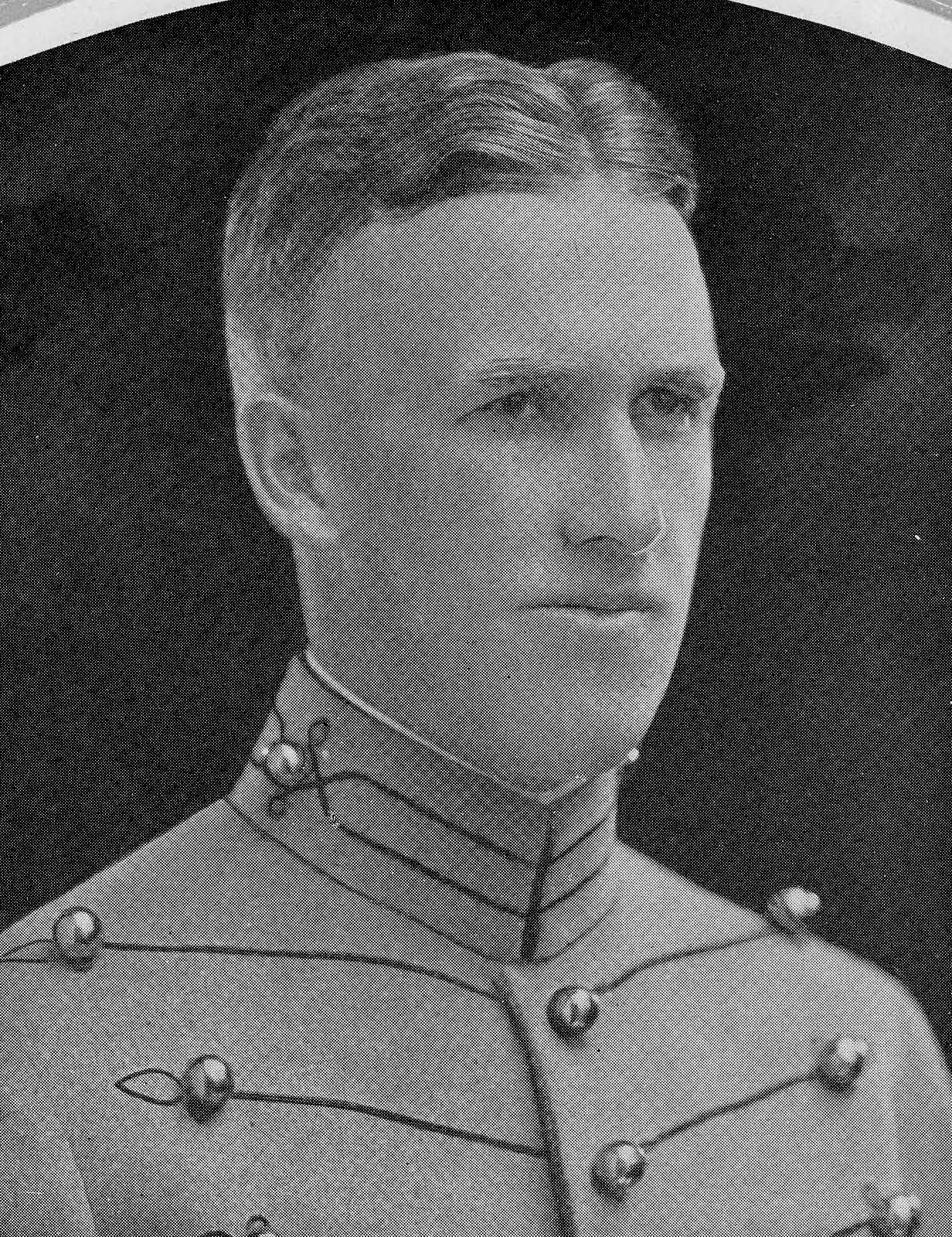
At West Point in 1925

Cannon attended the University of Utah for two years, before transferring to the United States Military Academy. He graduated in 1925, received a commission as a second lieutenant in the Field Artillery branch, and was initially assigned to Fort D.A. Russell, Wyoming.

In 1927 Cannon completed the Army Air Corps Primary Flying School. He attended the Battery Officers Course in 1931, and graduated from the Army Command and General Staff College in 1938. Prior to World War II Cannon served as an instructor at the Army's Fort Sill, Oklahoma Field Artillery School.

== World War II ==
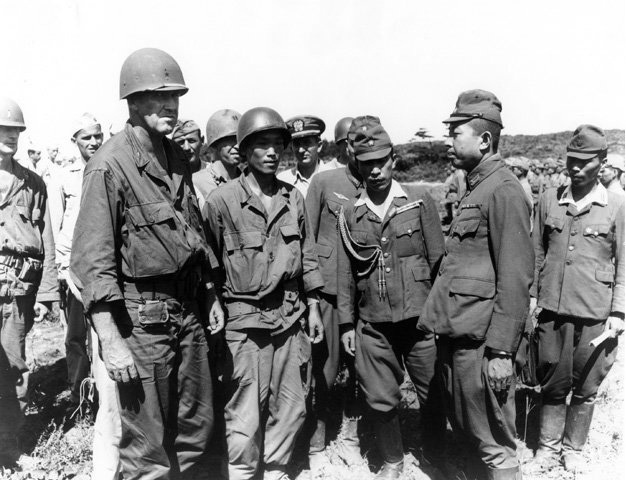
Cannon questions Japanese commander, Miyake Island, Japan, September 1945

In World War II Cannon served in the China-Burma-India Theater, advancing to brigadier general and chief of staff for the Northern Combat Area Command.

== Post World War II ==
After World War II Cannon served as chairman of an Army board which interviewed and made recommendations on applicants for commissions as officers. He also served as Assistant Chief of Staff for Logistics, G-4 for Sixth United States Army.

In 1948 Cannon attended the Basic Airborne Course in preparation for his assignment to the 82nd Airborne Division, afterwards taking command of the Division Artillery.

Cannon served as commander of the U.S. Army Advisory Group in Turkey from 1951 to 1952.

From 1952 to 1953 Cannon was head of the Army Audit Agency.

Cannon then served as Chief of the Joint U.S. Military Advisory Group which advised the Philippine government during its effort to stop the Hukbalahap insurgency.

Following his Philippines assignment, Cannon was appointed Service Special Assistant to the Joint Chiefs of Staff for Mutual Defense Advisory Pact Affairs.

== Later military career ==
Cannon served as deputy commander and chief of staff for United States Army Pacific, receiving promotion to lieutenant general.

In 1958 Cannon was a participant in the ceremony used by the Army to select World War II and Korean War remains for placement in the Tomb of the Unknowns.

From 1959 until his 1961 retirement General Cannon served as commander of the Sixth United States Army.

== Awards and decorations ==
Cannon's awards included the Army Distinguished Service Medal, the Legion of Merit and the Bronze Star Medal.

== Retirement and death ==
Cannon retired to San Francisco. He died in Norwalk, Connecticut on 3 September 1976, after being stricken while visiting his daughter JoAnne Schwartz in Wilton, Connecticut. He was buried in San Francisco National Cemetery, Plot H-35.

== Personal ==
While stationed at Fort Sheridan, Illinois in 1928 Cannon married Josephine Riter (1902–1991), a member of another family prominent in Utah.
